= Next Romanian parliamentary election =

- On or before 30 November 2028

All 136 seats in the Senate All 331 seats in the Chamber of Deputies 69 S and 166 D seats needed for a majority
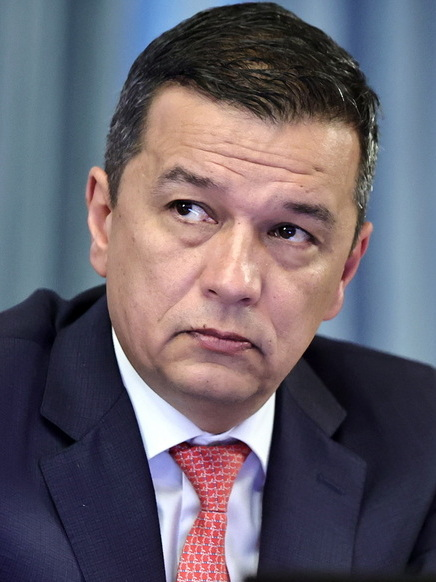

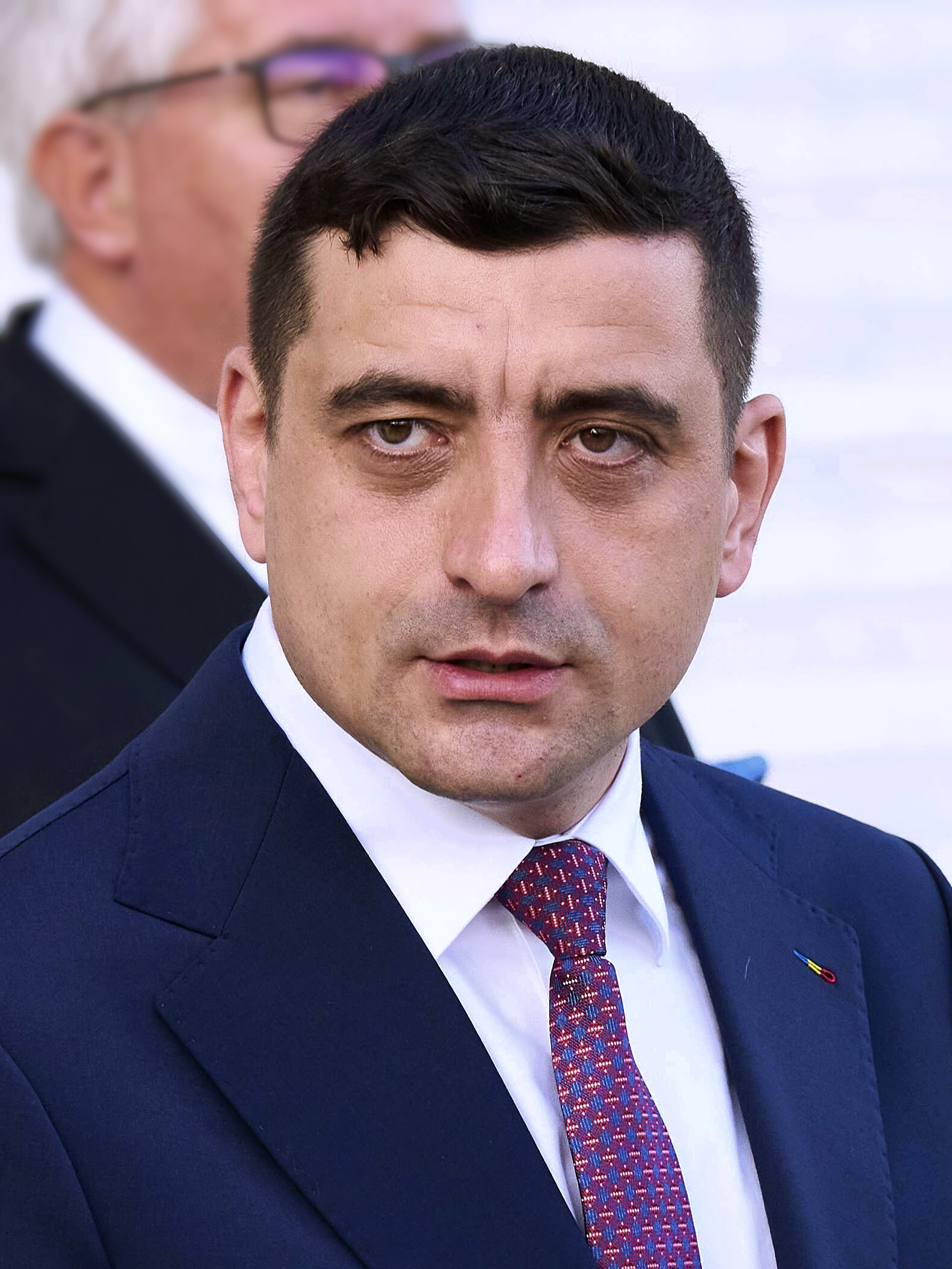

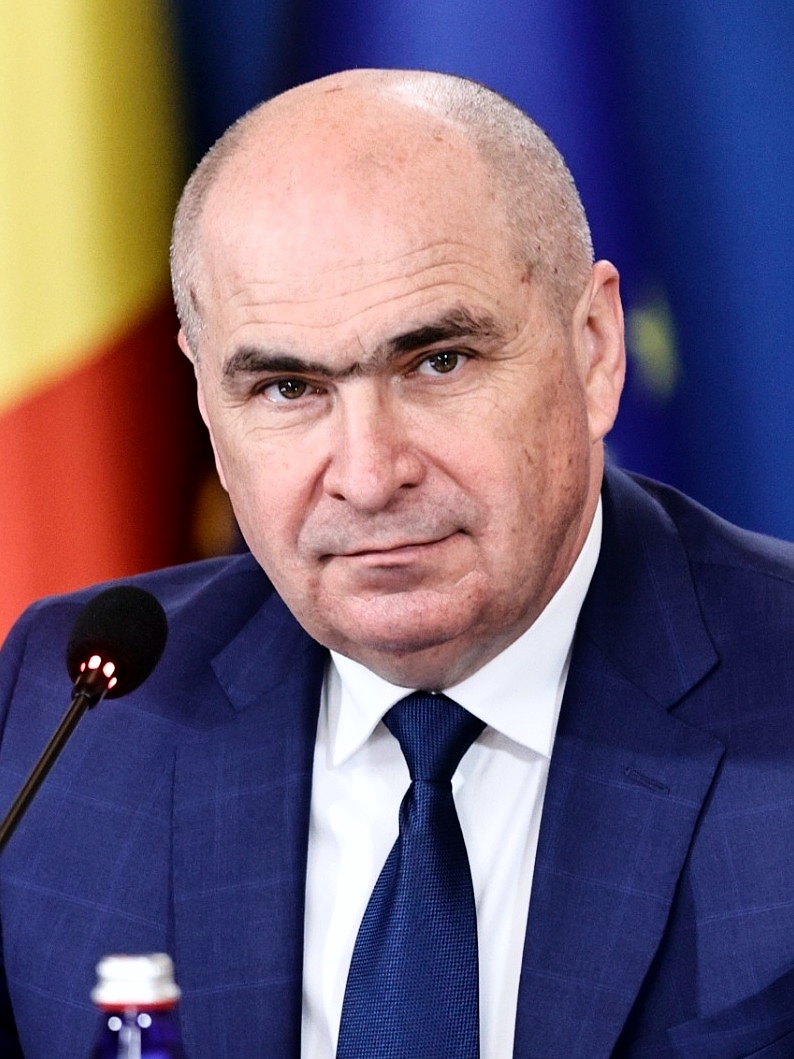

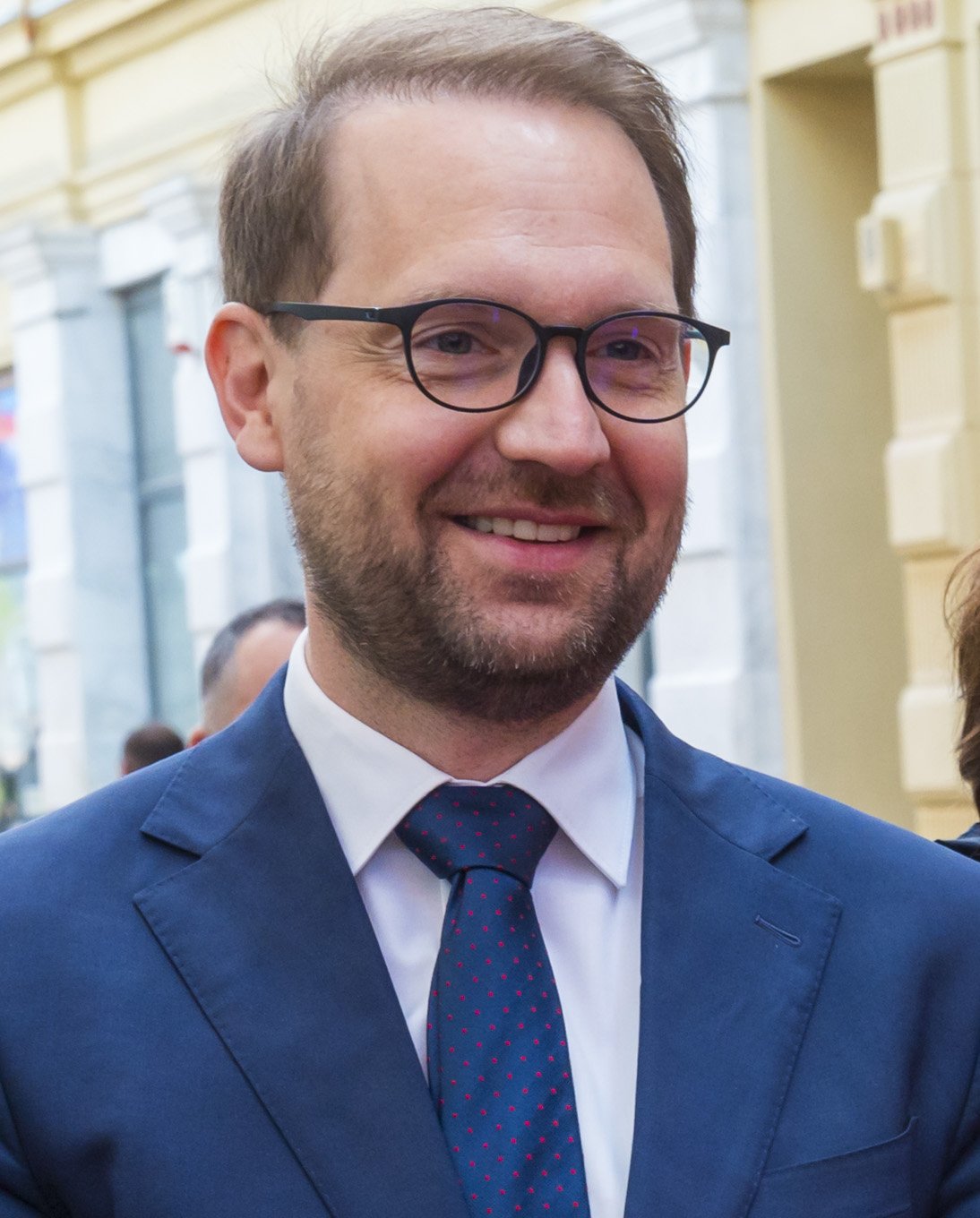

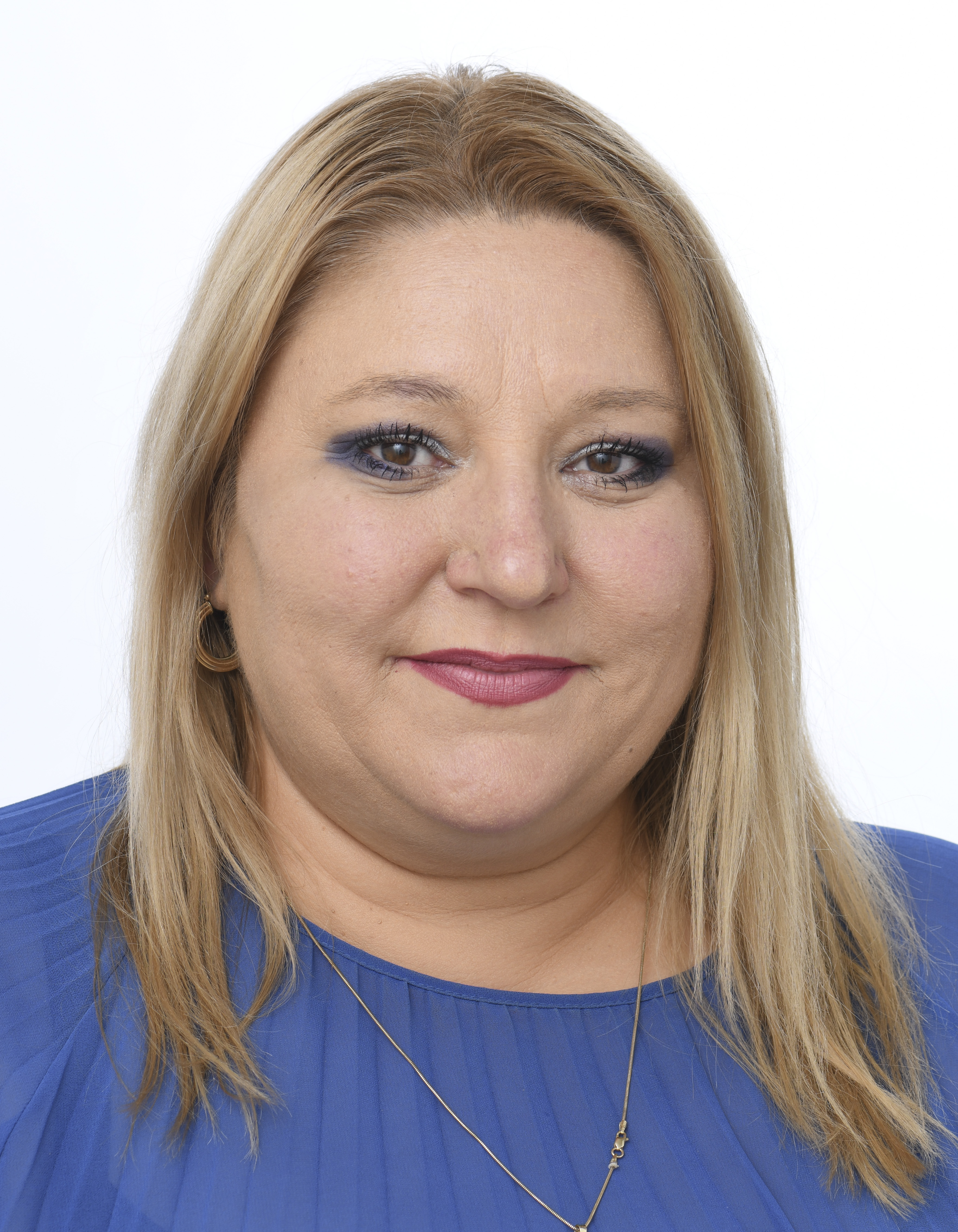

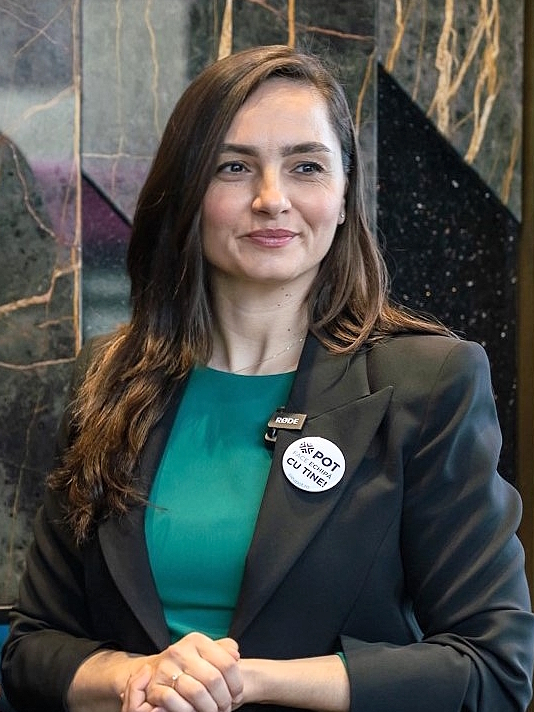

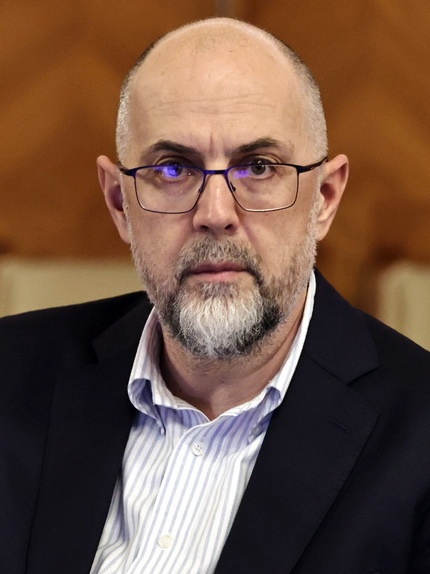

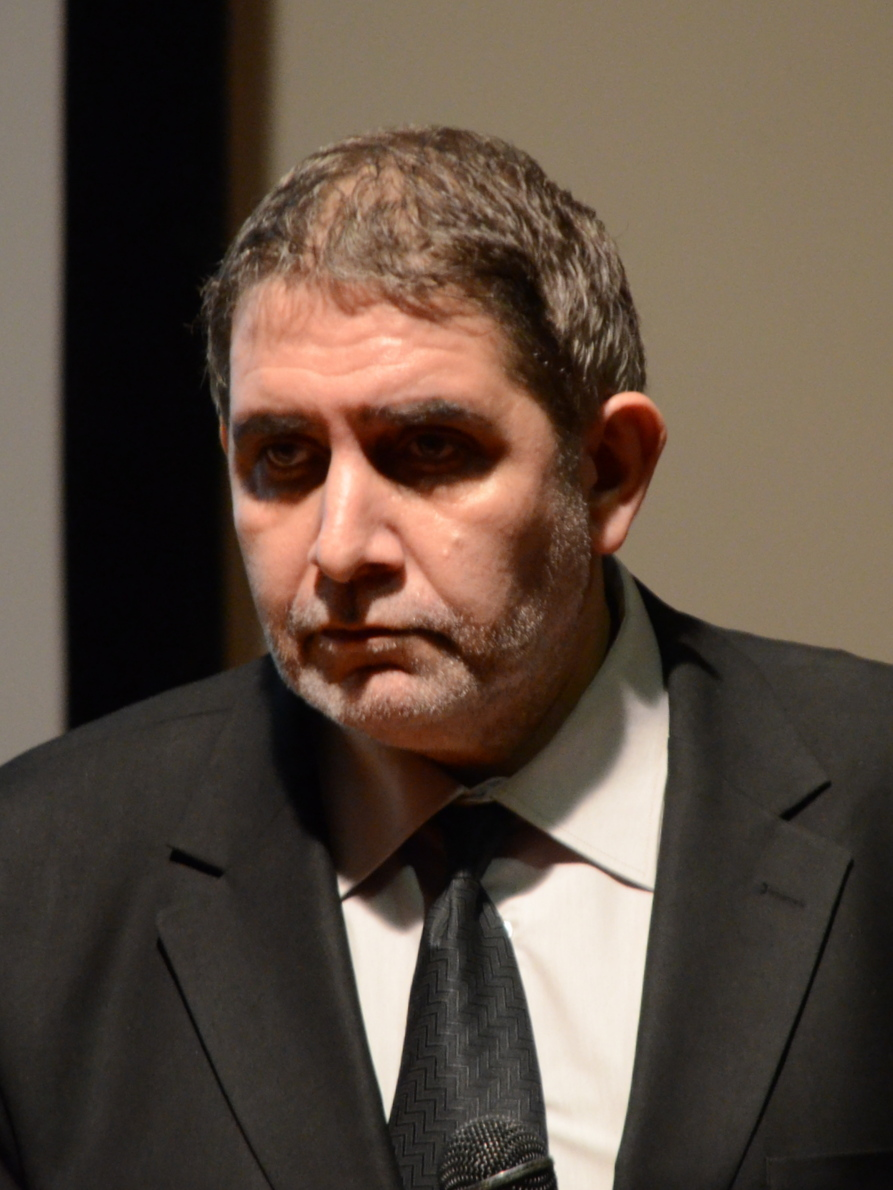
Leader	Sorin Grindeanu	George Simion	Ilie Bolojan
Party	PSD	AUR	PNL
Leader since	20 May 2025	19 September 2019	25 November 2024
Leader's seat	D – Timiș	D – Bucharest	S – Bihor
Last election	36 S / 86 D	28 S / 63 D	22 S / 49 D
Current seats	40 S / 92 D	30 S / 62 D	27 S / 55 D
Leader	Dominic Fritz	Diana Șoșoacă	Anamaria Gavrilă
Party	USR	SOS RO	POT
Leader since	5 May 2025	23 November 2021	31 July 2023
Leader's seat	N/A	N/A (Note: stood for S – Bucharest in previous election, refused to take the seat.)	D – Hunedoara
Last election	19 S / 40 D	12 S / 28 D	7 S / 24 D
Current seats	18 S / 40 D	0 S / 13 D	0 S / 15 D
Leader	Hunor Kelemen	Varujan Pambuccian (Note: Pambuccian, a member of the Union of Armenians of Romania, has been the parliamentary leader of the national minorities' group since 1996.)
Party	UDMR	Minority parties
Leader since	26 February 2011	21 October 1996
Leader's seat	D – Harghita	D – Nationwide (Note: National minorities have nationwide mandates and do not represent a specific county.)
Last election	10 S / 22 D	– S / 19 D
Current seats	10 S / 21 D	– S / 17 D
Incumbent Prime Minister
Luca Niculescu
Independent

Parliamentary elections will take place on or before 30 November 2028 to elect the 136 members of the Senate and the 331 members of the Chamber of Deputies. They will be the 11th parliamentary elections in post-1989 Romania (i.e. after the Romanian revolution).

== Background ==
After the 2024 Romanian parliamentary election, a pro-European coalition was formed between the centre-left Social Democratic Party (PSD), the centre-right National Liberal Party (PNL), the centre-right Democratic Union of Hungarians in Romania (UDMR/RMDSZ), and Romanian ethnic minority parties. The liberal reformist Save Romania Union (USR) party also initially signed an agreement to enter government but subsequently went into opposition.

Following the results of the first round of the 2025 Romanian presidential election in which government-endorsed Crin Antonescu failed to advance to the runoff, Ciolacu announced that Social Democratic Party would leave the coalition and resigned from the position of Prime Minister of Romania. Marcel Ciolacu stated that after seeing how Romanians had voted, "the governing coalition has no legitimacy, at least in this component", and at the same time PSD ministers remained in the government on the interim basis.

On 6 May 2025, interim President Ilie Bolojan appointed Cătălin Predoiu to serve as interim Prime Minister. The presidential election was won by Bucharest mayor Nicușor Dan, who appointed Bolojan as the next Prime Minister on 23 June, leading a grand coalition with the same parties and Save Romania Union (USR). On 23 April 2026, the Social Democratic Party left the grand coalition, leaving it with a minority in parliament.

On 5 May 2026, a motion of no confidence initiated by the PSD and AUR toppled the incumbent Bolojan government. On 20 October 2026, Bolojan was succedeed by Luca Niculescu, which effectively ended the political crisis that has lasted for half a year.

== Electoral system ==
Both the 331 members of the Chamber of Deputies and the 136 members of the Senate are elected in 43 multi-member constituencies based on Romania's 41 counties, the municipality of Bucharest, as well as the Romanian diaspora using party-list proportional representation. Law no. 208/2015 outlines that each constituency is to be awarded one deputy every 73,000 people and one senator every 168,000 people in accordance with the population data collected on 1 January of the previous year by the National Institute of Statistics (INS). Constituencies cannot have less than 4 deputies and 2 senators.

Parties must pass an electoral threshold of 5% of the national vote or at least 20% of the vote in four constituencies. Electoral alliances must pass a higher threshold, namely 8% for those with two member-parties, 9% for three and 10% for alliances of more. Further seats (currently 19) can be added in the Chamber of Deputies for ethnic minority groups that compete in the elections and pass a lower threshold (5% of the votes needed to win a seat in the lower chamber, calculated by dividing the number of votes of parties, alliances and independent candidates that passed the threshold by the amount of seats that they won).

Following the elections, seats are allocated to the candidates of successful parties and lists in several stages, starting with constituencies, where seats are distributed according to the Hare quota of the constituency. Unused votes are then transferred and congregated at the national level, where remaining seats are distributed using the D'Hondt method, to ensure overall proportionality between a party's national vote share and its share of parliamentary seats. These remaining seats are then allocated to party candidates within the constituencies, based on the party results in each constituencies.

=== Parliamentary composition ===
Party	Ideology	Leader(s)	Initial seating (Note: as per the 2024 results)		Current seats	Government		
Party	Ideology	Leader(s)	Votes	Seats	Current seats	Ciolacu (2024–2025)	Bolojan (2025–2026)	Niculescu (2026–)
PSD	Social democracy Social conservatism	Sorin Grindeanu	22.0% (D); 22.3% (S)	86 / 330 36 / 134	92 / 330 43 / 136	Government	Government until 05 May 2026	Government
AUR	Romanian nationalism Right-wing populism	George Simion	18.0% (D); 18.3% (S)	63 / 330 28 / 134	62 / 330 30 / 134	Opposition	Opposition	Opposition
PNL	Conservatism; Pro-Europeanism	Ilie Bolojan	13.2% (D); 14.3% (S)	49 / 330 22 / 134	55 / 330 27 / 134	Government	Government	Support (Note: PNL does not participate in the government, however almost all PNL MPs vote in favor of Niculescu cabinet on october confidence vote.)
USR	Liberalism; Pro-Europeanism	Dominic Fritz	12.4% (D); 12.3% (S)	40 / 330 19 / 134	40 / 330 18 / 134	Opposition	Government	Opposition
SOS	Right-wing populism; Hard Euroscepticism; Russophilia	Diana Șoșoacă	7.4% (D); 7.8% (S)	28 / 330 12 / 134	13 / 330 0 / 135	Opposition	Opposition	Opposition
POT	Right-wing populism	Anamaria Gavrila	6.5% (D); 6.4% (S)	24 / 330 7 / 134	6 / 330 1 / 134	Opposition	Opposition	Support (Note: POT does not participate in the government, however a part of POT MPs and also UPR paralmentary group vote in favor of Niculescu cabinet on october confidence vote.)
UDMR	Hungarian minority interests	Hunor Kelemen	6.3% (D); 6.4% (S)	22 / 330 10 / 134	21 / 330 10 / 134	Government	Government	Support (Note: UDMR does not participate in the government, however a part of UDMR MPs vote in favor of Niculescu cabinet on october confidence vote.)
UNIT	Anti-establishment; Sovereignism	Aurora Tasica Simu	New	Split party	4 / 330 0 / 134	Opposition	Opposition	Opposition
PACE	Ultranationalism; Right-wing populism	Ninel Peia	New	Split party	1 / 330 2 / 134	—	Opposition	Support (Note: PACE does not participate in the government, however all PACE MPs vote in favor of Niculescu cabinet on october confidence vote.)
Independents or Others	—	—	—	19 / 330 0 / 134	36 / 330 2 / 134	— (Note: Depends, some non-inscript members support the government, some does not.)		
Vacant seats	—	—	—		1 / 331 2 / 136	—		

== Opinion polls ==
Political polling in Romania has generally been associated with higher error rates compared to the European average. Among Romanian pollsters, INSCOP has recorded the lowest pre-election error rate at 14.0%, while CSPS (Centrul pentru Studii Politice și Sociologice) has been identified as having the highest, at 60.0%. Marius Lulea, the owner of CSPS, previously served as the first vice president of a political party. Several reports have also documented connections between certain pollsters and political actors.

=== Party polls ===

Date	Poll source	Sample size	PSD	AUR	PNL	USR	SOS	POT	UDMR	SENS	PMP	FD	REPER	DREPT	Others	Lead
26 Oct–2 Nov 2026	INSCOP	1,197	24.6	34.6	15.1	11.9	2.1	1.8	3.9	3.0	—N/a	—N/a	—N/a	—N/a	2.9	10.0
22–27 Oct 2026	CURS	1,068	26	34	16	8	2	—N/a	5	3	—N/a	—N/a	—N/a	—N/a	6	8
21–26 Oct 2026	Avangarde	1,000	26	35	15	10	2	—N/a	5	4	—N/a	—N/a	—N/a	—N/a	3	9
16–22 Sep 2026	CURS	1,100	25	34	18	8	3	—N/a	5	2	—N/a	—N/a	—N/a	—N/a	5	9
12–22 Sep 2026	Avangarde	1,020	23	36	16	8	3	2	5	2	1	—N/a	1	—N/a	3	13
1–7 Sep 2026	INSCOP	1,100	18.7	39.7	16.3	9.0	2.7	2.7	5.5	4.1	—N/a	—N/a	—N/a	—N/a	1.2	21.0
14–24 Jul 2026	CURS	1,108	23	34	21	9	3	—N/a	4	—N/a	—N/a	—N/a	—N/a	—N/a	6	11
30 Jun–3 Jul 2026	ARP	1,774	17.9	36.4	22.4	10.5	2.9	1.3	4.9	1.9	1.3	—N/a	0.6	—N/a	—N/a	14
29 Jun–2 Jul 2026	IRES	1,002	21	40	17	10	2	1	3	2	—N/a	—N/a	—N/a	—N/a	4	19
11–14 May 2026	INSCOP	1,100	17.5	38.2	20.3	10	2.9	1.9	5.0	2.5	—N/a	—N/a	—N/a	—N/a	1.8	17.9
1–14 May 2026	CURS	1,664	24	32	20	10	3	—N/a	5	—N/a	—N/a	—N/a	—N/a	—N/a	6	8
1 May 2026	USR	1,145	14.1	33	21	15.3	—N/a	—N/a	—N/a	—N/a	—N/a	—N/a	—N/a	—N/a	16.6	12
28 Apr–1 May 2026	CURS	1,098	23	34	18	10	3	2	5	—N/a	—N/a	—N/a	—N/a	—N/a	5	11
1–10 Apr 2026	ARP	1,187	17.2	35.8	14.2	11.2	6	3.3	5.5	2.6	1.4	—N/a	1.8	—N/a	1	18.6
1–7 Apr 2026	INSCOP	1,100	20.1	37.0	15.5	12.7	2.8	3.6	4.3	2.4	—N/a	—N/a	—N/a	—N/a	1.7	16.9
26 Mar–4 Apr 2026	Sociopol	1,008	18	36	16	18	1	1	4	2	—N/a	0	1	—N/a	3	18
23–27 Mar 2026	CURS	1,517	24	33	16	9	4	3	5	—N/a	—N/a	—N/a	—N/a	—N/a	6	9
10–17 Mar 2026	Avangarde	1,000	22	35	14	11	3	2	5	2	1	1	—N/a	1	3	13
2–6 Mar 2026	INSCOP	1,100	19.2	38	14.5	11.4	3.3	3	4	3.6	—N/a	—N/a	—N/a	—N/a	3	18.8
14–23 Jan 2026	CURS	1,067	23	35	18	10	5	2	5	—N/a	—N/a	—N/a	—N/a	—N/a	2	12
12–15 Jan 2026	INSCOP	1,100	18.2	40.9	13.5	11.7	2.8	1.5	4.9	3.4	—N/a	—N/a	—N/a	—N/a	3.1	22.7
10–19 Dec 2025	CURS	1,067	22	35	19	9	5	3	5	—N/a	—N/a	—N/a	—N/a	—N/a	2	13
4–17 Dec 2025	IRES	1,012	21	36	18	11	2	3	2	3	—N/a	—N/a	1	—N/a	3	15
25 Oct–2 Nov 2025	INSCOP	3,000	19.5	38	14.6	12.3	1.7	3.1	4.8	3.2	—N/a	—N/a	—N/a	—N/a	2.8	18.5
14–26 Oct 2025	CURS	1,036	24	35	15	10	4	7	4	—N/a	—N/a	—N/a	—N/a	—N/a	1	11
6–10 Oct 2025	INSCOP	1,100	17.6	40	14.8	11.5	2	2.6	5.2	3.4	—N/a	—N/a	—N/a	—N/a	2.9	22.4
5–19 Sep 2025	CURS	1,100	23	34	16	12	5	3	5	—N/a	—N/a	—N/a	—N/a	—N/a	2	11
9–18 Sep 2025	Avangarde	1,300	19	41	13	12	2	2	6	—N/a	1	1	—N/a	1	2	22
1–9 Sep 2025	INSCOP	1,103	17.9	40.8	15.2	12.8	2.8	3.3	4	2.1	—N/a	—N/a	—N/a	—N/a	1.2	22.9
21–23 Jul 2025	Sociopol	1,002	21	38	15	12	1	2	5	3	—N/a	1	1	—N/a	1	17
15–23 Jul 2025	INSOMAR	1,012	17	36.5	14.4	13.2	1.9	2.5	4.9	—N/a	0.7	—N/a	0.5	0.7	7.7	19.5
10–12 Jul 2025	FlashData	7,500	18	38	16	16	1.5	0.5	4.5	—N/a	—N/a	—N/a	—N/a	—N/a	5.5	20
4–10 Jul 2025	CURS	1,067	20	38	15	12	4	4	5	—N/a	—N/a	—N/a	—N/a	—N/a	2	18
20–26 Jun 2025	INSCOP	1,150	13.7	40.5	17.3	13.1	1.9	4.2	5.2	2.4	—N/a	—N/a	—N/a	—N/a	1.9	23.2
26–30 May 2025	INSCOP	1,150	17.4	38.1	16	12.2	2.5	3.2	4.5	3.3	—N/a	—N/a	—N/a	—N/a	2.8	20.7
26–30 May 2025	CURS	1,287	24	35	14	14	5	2	5	—N/a	—N/a	—N/a	—N/a	—N/a	1	11
26–28 May 2025	Sociopol	1,001	17	36	14	12	2	3	6	3	—N/a	2	2	—N/a	3	19
23–28 May 2025	Avangarde	1,300	20	32	16	15	4	3	5	—N/a	1	1	—N/a	1	2	12
24–26 Apr 2025	FlashData	7,500	19	26	15	9	2	3	4	—N/a	—N/a	—N/a	—N/a	—N/a	22	7
3–5 Apr 2025	FlashData	7,500	18.5	27	13	14	3.5	4	3	—N/a	—N/a	—N/a	—N/a	—N/a	17	8.5
24–28 Mar 2025	Verifield	1,100	21.2	31.7	15	12.9	3.6	7	5.1	0.8	—N/a	—N/a	1.2	0.6	0.9	10.5
14–16 Feb 2025	FlashData	7,500	21.2	27.9	12.3	19	5.6	6.7	3.4	—N/a	1.1	0.6	1.1	—N/a	1.1	6.7
21–25 Jan 2025	CURS	1,100	24	22	15	13	5	10	5	—N/a	—N/a	—N/a	—N/a	—N/a	6	2
10–16 Jan 2025	Avangarde	1,354	22	29	13	13	8	5	4	—N/a	3	2	—N/a	—N/a	1	7
1 Dec 2024	2024 Chamber election	—N/a	21.96	18.01	13.20	12.40	7.36	6.46	6.33	2.99	2.05		1.24	1.16	6.84	3.95
1 Dec 2024	2024 Senate election	—N/a	22.30	18.30	14.28	12.26	7.76	6.39	6.38	2.84	1.88		1.37	1.24	5	4.00

==== Scenario polls ====
PNL and USR run as an alliance in the next election

Date	Poll source	Sample size	PSD	AUR	PNL	USR	SOS	POT	UDMR	SENS	Others	Lead
26 Oct–2 Nov 2026	INSCOP	1,197	20.9	35.0	32.1		1.8	1.6	4.1	3.2	1.3	2.9

=== Age groups ===
Date	Poll source	Sample size	Age group	PSD	AUR	PNL	USR	SOS	POT	UDMR	SENS	Others
25 Oct–2 Nov 2025	INSCOP	3,000	18 to 29 years	9	34	13	14	3	5	3	16	3
25 Oct–2 Nov 2025	INSCOP	3,000	30 to 44 years	8	50	11	18	1	3	3	1	2
25 Oct–2 Nov 2025	INSCOP	3,000	45 to 59 years	15	41	19	12	2	2	6	1	1
25 Oct–2 Nov 2025	INSCOP	3,000	60 years and older	38	28	15	7	2	3	6	-	2

=== Politician approval ratings ===
Date	Poll source	Sample size	Grindeanu PSD	Simion AUR	Dungaciu AUR	Bolojan PNL	Predoiu PNL	Ciucu PNL	Fritz USR	Șoșoacă SOS	Gavrilă POT	Kelemen UDMR	Dan Ind.	Georgescu Ind.	Ponta Ind.
2–6 Mar 2026	INSCOP	1,100	12	34.3	7.8	25.1	—N/a	15.7	14.9	—N/a	—N/a	—N/a	27.6	—N/a	20.9
10–19 Dec 2025	CURS	1,067	25	37	—N/a	25	—N/a	27	15	16	12	—N/a	35	40	—N/a
5–19 Sep 2025	CURS	1,100	26	38	—N/a	26	—N/a	—N/a	19	19	19	—N/a	34	40	—N/a
4–10 Jul 2025	CURS	1,067	26	38	—N/a	32	—N/a	—N/a	22	19	16	24	38	—N/a	—N/a
26–30 May 2025	INSCOP	1,150	12.9	33.9	—N/a	42.2	—N/a	—N/a	16.4	—N/a	—N/a	26.7	47	—N/a	20
26–30 May 2025	CURS	1,287	36	42	—N/a	42	—N/a	—N/a	27	22	9	25	57	—N/a	—N/a
23–28 May 2025	Avangarde	1,300	20	19	—N/a	40	15	—N/a	14	7	—N/a	—N/a	44	22	—N/a

=== National approval rating ===
Polling firm	Fieldwork date	Sample size	Is Romania going on a good path/direction?			
Polling firm	Fieldwork date	Sample size	check	X mark	Question	Net
Polling firm	Fieldwork date	Sample size	Approval	Disapproval	Question	Net
Avangarde	10–17 Mar 2026	1,000	18	79	3	−61
CURS	10–19 Dec 2025	1,067	21	75	4	−54
Avangarde	Jul–Sep 2025	1,300	21	74	5	−53
Avangarde	Jul–Sep 2025	1,300	23	73	4	−50
Avangarde	Jul–Sep 2025	1,300	27	66	7	−39
FlashData	10–12 Jul 2025	7,500	23	71	6	−48
CURS	4–10 Jul 2025	1,067	26	69	5	−43
CURS	26–30 May 2025	1,287	34	59	7	−25
Avangarde	23–28 May 2025	1,300	38	53	9	−15
