= Peace – Romania First =

Peace – Romania First Pace – Întâi România
- Abbreviation: Pace
- President: Dorin-Silviu Petrea (first); Cosmina Cerva (last)
- Secretary: Rodica Cușnir (first and last)
- Founder: Nadia Cosmina Cerva
- Founded: 1 September 2025
- Registered: 3 September 2025
- Dissolved: October 2026 (as a parliamentary group)
- Split from: SOS Romania; Party of Young People
- Ideology: Civic nationalism (self-claim); Pro-Europeanism (self-claim)
- Senate: 3 / 134

Peace – Romania First (Romanian: Pace – Întâi România, Pace) is a Romanian political party and former parliamentary group in the Senate of Romania formed by a group of senators elected in the 2024 parliamentary election, having previously been members of SOS Romania or the Party of Young People. The group was disbanded after several senators left the group to join other political parties, and was reorganised as a political party by the remaining senators.

== History ==
On 1 September 2025, Nadia Cosmina Cerva, the former leader of SOS Romania's Senate group, announced that the group's members had decided to rename it to Peace – Romania First. Furthermore, she announced that three additional senators had joined the group, one former member of SOS and two former members of the Party of Young People (POT). On the same day, former members of the two parties announced the formation of the Independent Parliamentary Group in the Chamber of Deputies.

On 2 September, MEP Diana Șoșoacă, the leader of SOS Romania, expelled all but one of the party's senators. In retaliation, the sole remaining senator, Dumitru Manea, was expelled from Peace – Romania First. Both Manea and Șoșoacă claimed that the group's creation and actions were illegal, however it was successfully registered during the plenary Senate meeting on 3 September.

Senator and 2019 presidential candidate Ninel Peia was elected chestor (quaestor) on behalf of the group.

On 25 October, the group, whose leadership had since been taken over by former Social Democratic prime minister Victor Ponta, now an independent MP, participated in an event organised by the Association of Turkish Businessmen in Romania. During this event, the group declared its intention to join the governing coalition, with the condition that the Save Romania Union (USR) be excluded. This came amid tensions between USR and prime minister Ilie Bolojan, with USR threatening to withdraw from the coalition. The declaration has drawn comparison between PACE and Gabriel Oprea's National Union for the Progress of Romania (UNPR), another party formed by dissidents from various other parties and which played a role in forming and changing parliamentary majorities.

Shortly before the founding of Pace, Andrei Csillag, a former member of POT who went on to join the group in the Chamber of Deputies, announced the foundation of the National Union for Innovation and Tradition (UNIT). On 27 October, fellow group member Aurora Simu, also a former member of POT, announced that she had also joined the new party, which would have a total of five deputies and two senators. However, apart from Simu and Csillag, the identities of the others were not revealed.

On 26 November, Ninel Peia announced that the group would be submitting a motion of no confidence in the Bolojan cabinet on 5 December, with the intention of removing the Save Romania Union from government, and claimed that the motion had enough support to pass.

For the 2025 snap election for the mayor of Bucharest, Pace supported the candidacy of influencer Alexandru Zidaru, a former member of SOS Romania. Following Zidaru's withdrawal in favour of Anca Alexandrescu, Pace also endorsed Alexandrescu.

On 10 December, senator Paul Gheorghe joined the group.

On the 25 of October 2026 the group announced that it would become a party and run for the 2028 parliamentary election.

The group was disbanded after several senators left the group to join other political parties. Currently, only 3 of the original members of the group remain, all in the unaffiliated group.

== Political positions ==
The group claims it combines both sovereigntist and pro-European ideas, although its members come from strongly Eurosceptic, Russophile parties.

The group is allegedly close to MEP Claudiu Târziu, the former co-leader of the Alliance for the Union of Romanians (AUR), who could be using Pace to stage a political comeback.

== See also ==
- National Union for Innovation and Tradition Party
