= General Council of Bucharest =

City council of Bucharest, Romania

General Council of the Municipality of Bucharest Romanian: Consiliul General al Municipiului București
- 2024-2028

Type
- Type: Unicameral

Leadership
- Mayor: Ciprian Ciucu, PNL since 19 December 2025

Structure
- Seats: 55
- General Council political groups: ADU (17); PSD (16); PNL (7); PUSL (6); AUR (5); REPER (4)

Elections
- General Council voting system: Closed party list
- Last General Council election: 9 June 2024

Meeting place
- The General City Hall of Bucharest

Website
- https://www.pmb.ro/

The General Council of Bucharest (Romanian: Consiliul General al Municipiului București) is the legislative body of the Municipality of Bucharest, and is made up of 55 councillors elected every four years.

Together with the Mayor of Bucharest and the Deputy Mayor, the General Council makes up the General City Hall of Bucharest, which is responsible for citywide affairs, such as the water system, the transport system and the main boulevards. Bucharest is also divided into six sectors, each of which has their own 27-seat Sectorial Council and Mayor, and is responsible for local area affairs, such as secondary streets, parks, schools, and the cleaning services.

== Structure ==
=== 2024–2028 ===
Party	Seats	Current Council
Social Democratic Party (PSD)	16	
Save Romania Union (USR)	13	
National Liberal Party (PNL)	7	
Social Liberal Humanist Party (PUSL)	6	
Alliance for the Union of Romanians (AUR)	5	
Renewing Romania's European Project (REPER)	4	
People's Movement Party (PMP)	2	
Force of the Right (FD)	2	

=== 2020–2024 ===
==== 2021–2024 ====
Party	Seats	Current Council
Social Democratic Party (PSD)	21	
Save Romania Union (USR)	17	
National Liberal Party (PNL)	12	
People's Movement Party (PMP)	5	

==== 2020–2021 ====
Party	Seats	Current Council
Social Democratic Party (PSD)	21	
National Liberal Party (PNL)	12	
Save Romania Union (USR)	11	
Freedom, Unity and Solidarity Party (PLUS)	6	
People's Movement Party (PMP)	5	

=== 2016–2020 ===
Party	Seats	Current Council
Social Democratic Party (PSD)	22	
Save Romania Union (USR)	15	
National Liberal Party (PNL)	8	
People's Movement Party (PMP)	4	
Alliance of Liberals and Democrats (ALDE)	4	

=== 2012–2016 ===
Party	Seats	Current Council
Social Liberal Union (USL)	37	
Democratic Liberal Party (PDL)	11	
People's Party – Dan Diaconescu (PP-DD)	7	

=== 2008–2012 ===
Party	Seats	Current Council
Democratic Liberal Party (PDL)	24	
Social Democratic Party (PSD)	16	
National Liberal Party (PNL)	8	
New Generation Party – Christian Democratic (PNG-CD)	4	
Greater Romania Party (PRM)	3	

=== 2004–2008 ===
==== 2007–2008 ====
Party	Seats	Current Council
Democratic Liberal Party (PDL)	19	
National Liberal Party (PNL)	15	
Social Democratic Party (PSD)	12	
Conservative Party (PC)	4	
Greater Romania Party (PRM)	3	
Independent	1	

==== 2004–2007 ====
Party	Seats	Current Council
Justice and Truth Alliance (DA)	32	
Social Democratic Party (PSD)	18	
Greater Romania Party (PRM)	4	
Independent	1	

=== 2000–2004 ===
Party	Seats	Current Council
Social Democratic Party (PSD)	28	
Romanian Democratic Convention (CDR)	10	
Democratic Party (PD)	8	
Greater Romania Party (PRM)	5	
Union of the Right-wing Forces (UFD)	4	
National Liberal Party (PNL)	4	
Alliance for Romania (ApR)	2	
New Generation Party (PNG)	2	
Romanian Pensioners' Party (PPR)	2	

=== 1996–2000 ===
Party	Seats	Current Council
Romanian Democratic Convention (CDR)	27	
Party of Social Democracy in Romania (PDSR)	12	
Social Democratic Union (USD)	7	
Greater Romania Party (PRM)	3	
Liberal Party 1993 (PL 93)	2	
Socialist Party of Labour (PSM)	2	
Others (Oth.)	12	
