= United Social Democratic Party (Romania) =

United Social Democratic Party Partidul Social Democrat Unit
- Abbreviation: PSDU
- President: Oana Crețu
- Secretary-General: Michael-Dan Ujeucă
- Founded: 2023
- Ideology: Social democracy Christian left Progressivism; Pro-Europeanism; Nationalism
- Political position: Centre-left
- Colors: Purple; White

Website
- www.psdu.ro

The United Social Democratic Party (Romanian: Partidul Social Democrat Unit, PSD Unit or PSDU) is a political party in Romania which follows a centre-left, social democratic and Christian democratic ideology.

== History ==
In the aftermath of the 2024 Romanian parliamentary election, the party attracted media attention due to its unusually high vote share for a minor party, which was assumed to be due to people voting for PSDU instead of the larger Social Democratic Party by mistake, as the two share very similar electoral symbols. However, party president Oana Crețu has claimed to be convinced that the party's result was genuine, citing her large following on TikTok.

In March 2025, the party registered Oana Crețu's candidacy for that year's presidential election. The Central Electoral Bureau (BEC) rejected her candidacy because only 197,194 of the 205,427 signatures submitted were deemed to be valid, less than the required 200,000. Crețu and other party members claimed that the remaining signatures had been collected using a pen with heat-sensitive ink, and that they had disappeared due to improper storage conditions. She called on the BEC to place the lists in the freezer in order to make the signatures visible, but her request was denied.

In November 2025, Oana Crețu became the party's candidate for Mayor of Bucharest, competing in the special election held to replace former mayor Nicușor Dan, who was elected president and had to renounce the position. One of her central campaign themes was opposition to bans on kendamas in schools. She came in 9th place in the election.

== Ideology ==
The party claims to be centre-left, progressive, Christian-social, and pro-European. It also presents itself as a youth-oriented party, campaigning on education reform and free school meals. The party supports a universal basic income.

== Electoral results ==
=== Parliamentary elections ===
Year	Chamber of Deputies			Senate			Status	Source
Year	Votes	Percentage	Seats	Votes	Percentage	Seats	Status	Source
2024	177,137	1.92%	0 / 331	164,659	1.78%	0 / 134	Extra-parliamentary opposition	

=== Local elections ===
==== Mayor of Bucharest ====
Year	Candidate	Votes	Percentge	Result	Source
2025	Oana Crețu	1,032	0.18%	9th	
