= 2025 Bucharest mayoral election =

- 7 December 2025
- Registered: 1,807,213
- Turnout: 32.64% (▼8.67%)
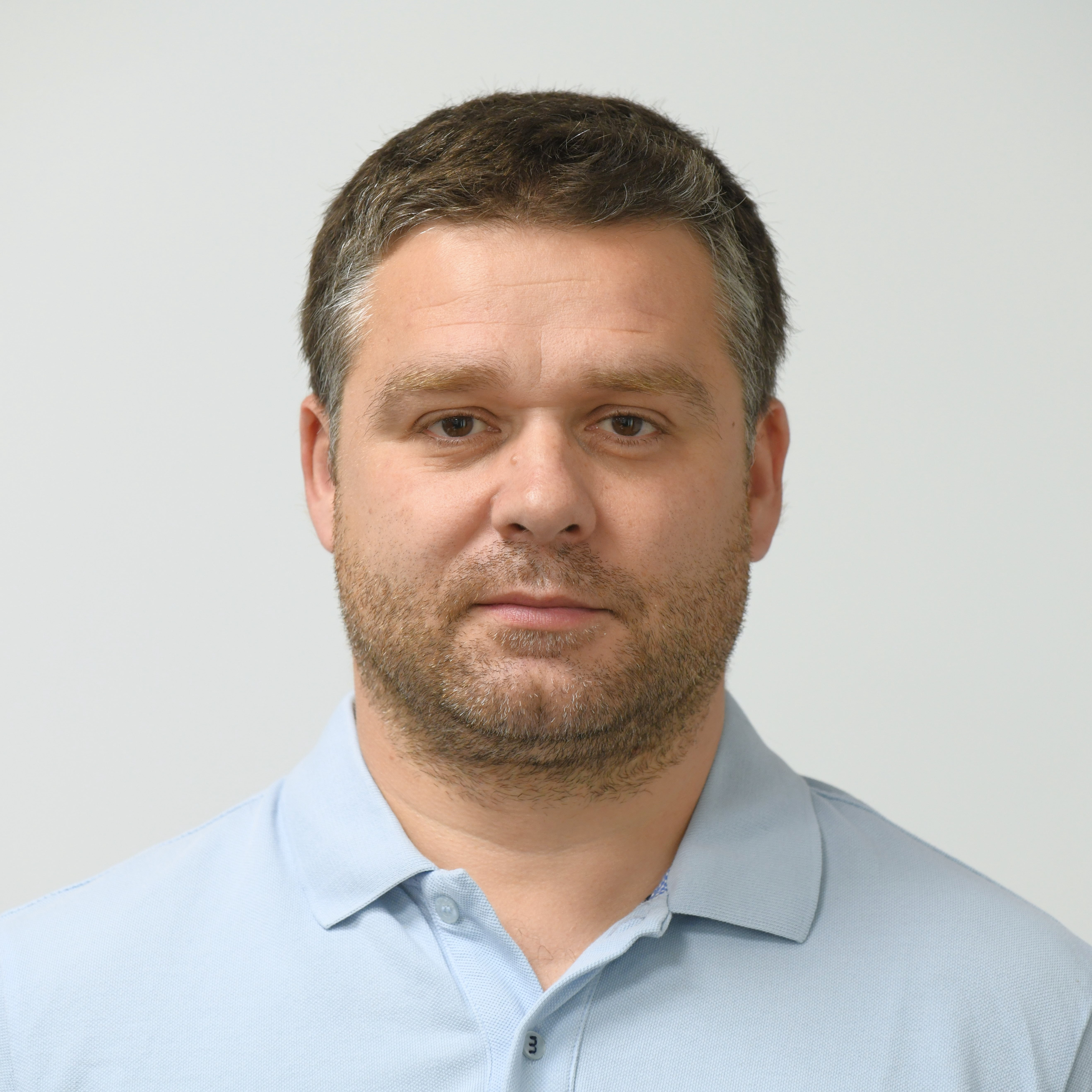

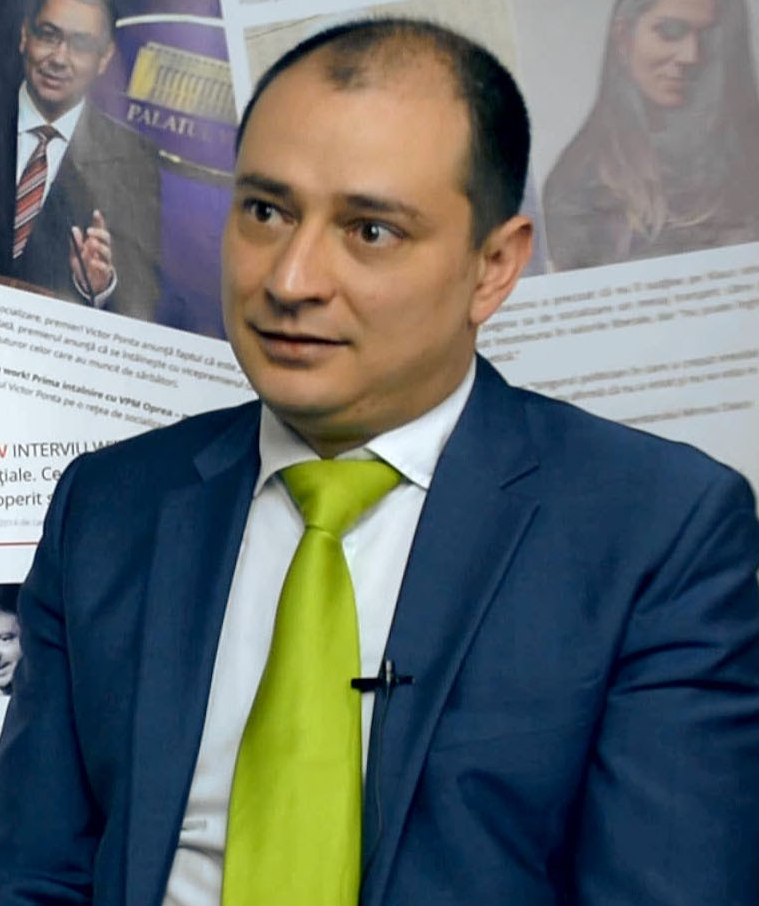

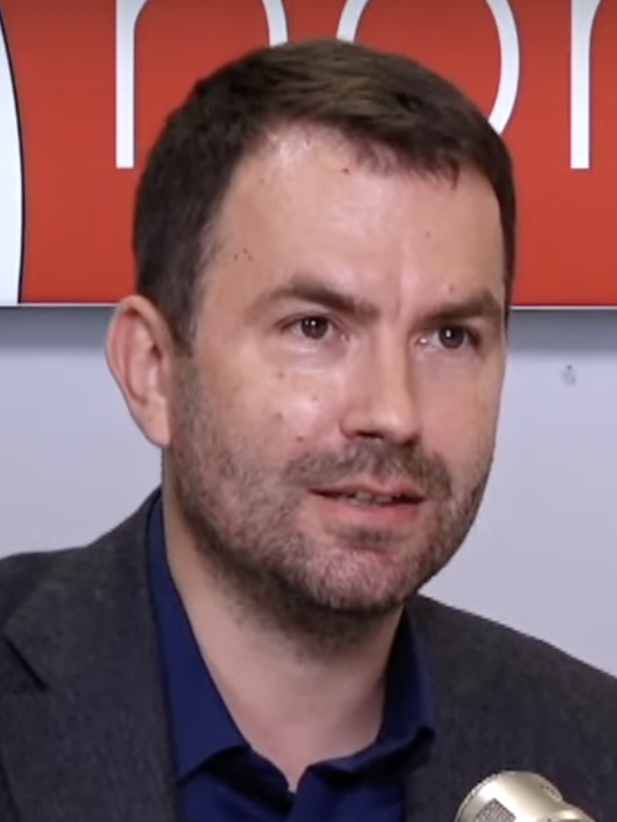

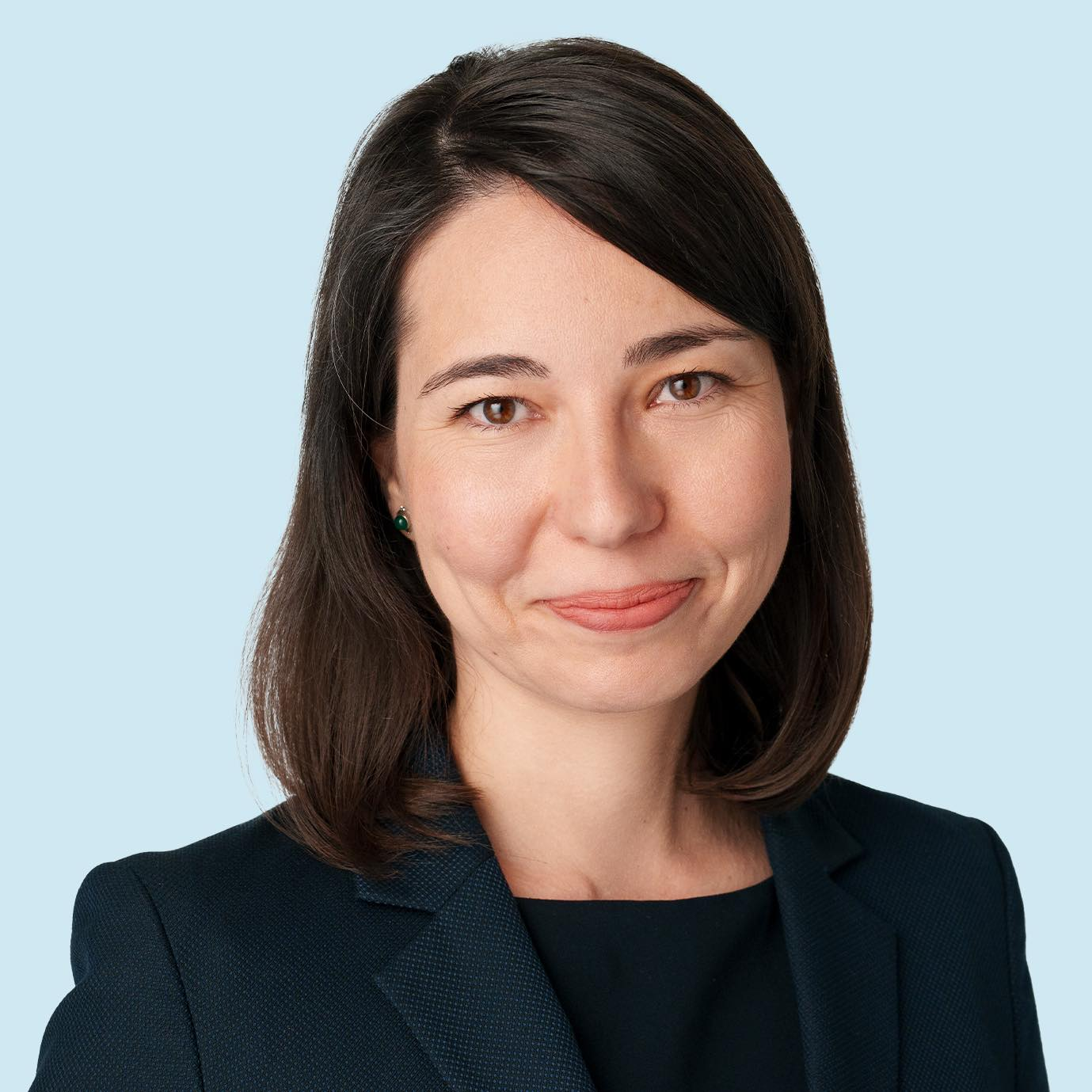
Nominee	Ciprian Ciucu	Anca Alexandrescu	Daniel Băluță
Party	PNL	AUR	PSD
Popular vote	211,562	128,405	120,001
Percentage	36.16%	21.94%	20.51%
Nominee	Cătălin Drulă	Ana Ciceală
Party	USR	SENS
Popular vote	81,310	34,239
Percentage	13.90%	5.85%
Mayor before election
Stelian Bujduveanu (acting)
PNL
Elected Mayor
Ciprian Ciucu
PNL

Snap mayoral elections were held on 7 December 2025 in the Romanian capital city of Bucharest, following the election of former mayor Nicușor Dan as President of Romania earlier that year.

== Electoral system ==
The General Mayor of Bucharest is elected through a secret, direct, and universal vote. The elections are held in a single round, a candidate being declared winner if they obtain the most votes from registered voters within the electoral list of the city. The mayor's term expires after four years, although in the election's unique context the mayor's term will expire in 2028, when local elections will be held nationally. Candidacies can be registered only if they are supported by at least 20.000 voters with their residence in Bucharest.

== Candidates ==
Candidate	Party affiliation	Endorsements
Cătălin Drulă	Save Romania Union	PMP, Volt
Daniel Băluță	Social Democratic Party	PNRR, PUSL
George Burcea	Party of Young People	
Ciprian Ciucu	National Liberal Party	REPER, FD, DREPT
Ana Ciceală	Health Education Nature Sustainability Party	
Liviu Gheorghe Floarea	National Peasants' Party Maniu-Mihalache	
Gheorghe Macovei	Greater Romania Party	
Oana Crețu	United Social Democratic Party	
Mihai Ioan Lasca	Patriots of the Romanian People	
Rareș Lazăr	Romania in Action Party	
Anca Alexandrescu	Justice for Bucharest Alliance (AUR–PNȚCD)	PACE
Dan Trifu	Independent	PV
Gheorghe "Gigi" Nețoiu	Independent	
Angela Negrotă	Independent	
Constantin-Titian Filip	Independent	

=== Withdrawn candidates ===
Candidate	Party affiliation	Endorsements	Endorsed
Virgil Alexandru Zidaru (Note: Commonly known by his influencer alias "Makaveli")	Independent	PACE	Anca Alexandrescu
Vlad Gheorghe (Note: Withdrew from the election but was still on the ballot.)	Independent	DREPT	Ciprian Ciucu
Eugen Teodorovici	Independent		Daniel Băluță

== Opinion polls ==
The following graph presents the average of all polls.

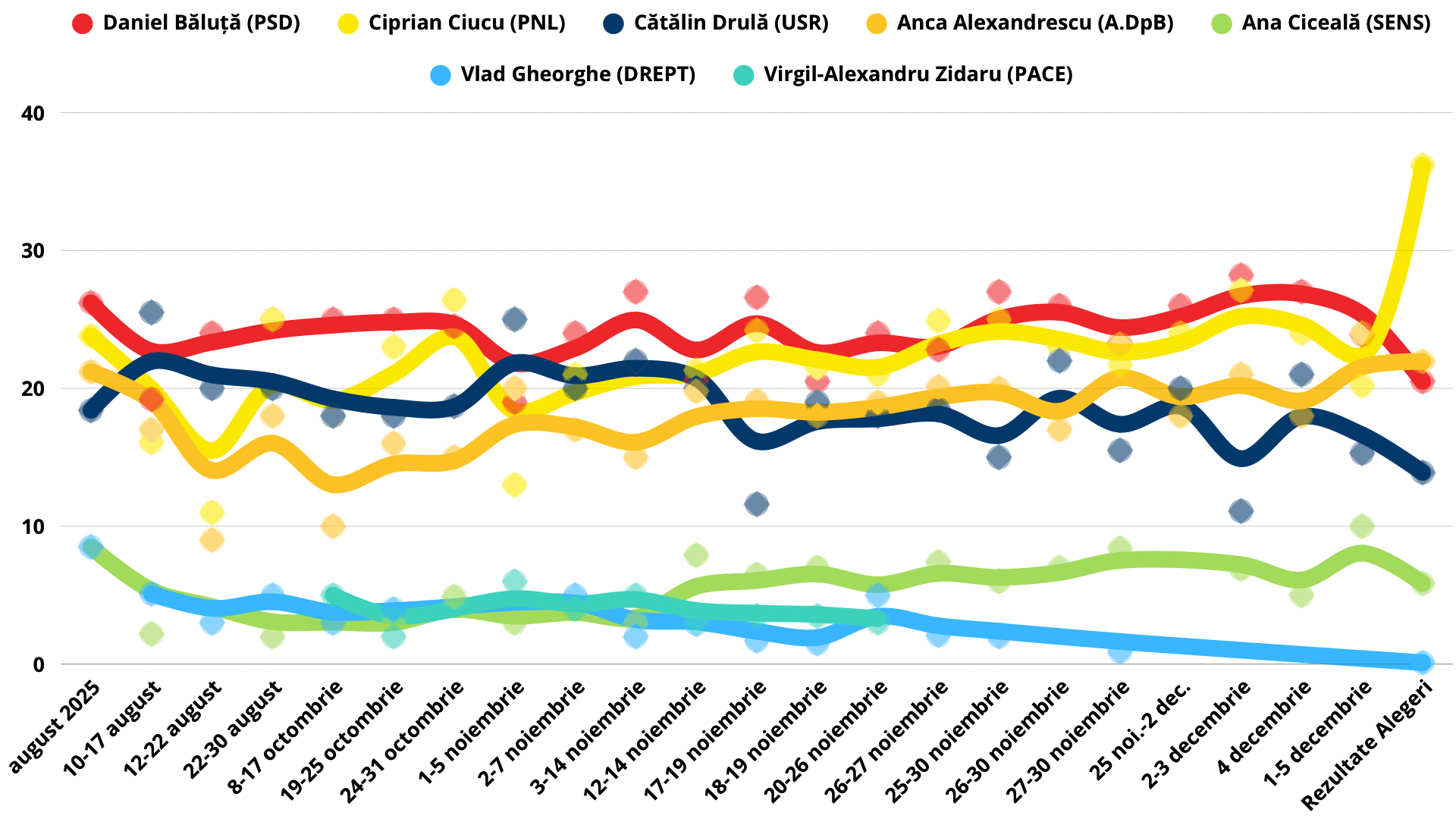

== Results ==

Candidate	Party	Votes	%
Ciprian Ciucu	National Liberal Party	211,562	36.16
Anca Alexandrescu	Justice for Bucharest Alliance (AUR–PNȚCD)	128,405	21.94
Daniel Băluță	Social Democratic Party	120,001	20.51
Cătălin Drulă	Save Romania Union	81,310	13.90
Ana Ciceală	Health Education Nature Sustainability Party	34,239	5.85
Eugen Teodorovici	Independent	1,610	0.28
George Burcea	Party of Young People	1,181	0.20
Gheorghe Nețoiu	Independent	1,104	0.19
Oana Crețu	United Social Democratic Party	1,032	0.18
Angela Negrotă	Independent	844	0.14
Dan Trifu	Independent	804	0.14
Vlad Gheorghe	Justice and Respect in Europe for All Party	633	0.11
Constantin-Titian Filip	Independent	615	0.11
Gheorghe Macovei	Greater Romania Party	555	0.09
Mihai Ioan Lasca	Patriots of the Romanian People	483	0.08
Liviu Floarea	National Peasants' Party Maniu-Mihalache	452	0.08
Rareș Lazăr	Romania in Action Party	303	0.05
Total		585,133	100.00
Valid votes		585,133	99.19
Invalid/blank votes		4,786	0.81
Total votes		589,919	100.00
Registered voters/turnout		1,807,213	32.64
Source: Permanent Electoral Authority
