= Florina Presadă =

Romanian activist and politician

Florina-Raluca Presadă (born 26 May 1978) is a Romanian activist and politician who is a Senator for Bucharest since 2016.

== Biography ==
Born in Bucharest, Presadă studied political science at the University of Bucharest, followed by a master's degree at the College of Europe in Bruges, Belgium. Between 2007 and 2016, she was a project coordinator at CeRe (Centrul de Resurse pentru Participare Publică, Resource Center for Public Participation), an NGO that encouraged public participation.

She was involved in public debates (for instance, she supports the municipalization of water in Bucharest), as well as protests such as the 2012 Romanian protests, and the 2013 Romanian protests against the Roșia Montană Project.

In the 2016 Romanian legislative election, she was the candidate for Bucharest of the Save Romania Union (USR), a progressive-liberal Romanian party.

In 2024, she was the lead candidate of the Health Education Nature Sustainability Party (SENS), a left-leaning progressive party, in the Bucharest constituency of the Chamber of Deputies, but did not win a seat as the party failed to obtain over 5% of the votes nationwide.

== Political positions ==
=== Transparence and public communication ===
Presadă accuses the lack of transparence and she says she wants to change the way the Parliament communicates with the people.

As part of the transparence of the Parliament, she supports publishing the nominal votes on the Parliament's website, as well as public meetings for the Parliamentary commissions and an annual activity report for MPs.

=== Social issues ===
Presadă argues that there are many social issues which have been improperly (or not at all) addressed by the government. For instance, the government after school program for disadvantaged community (which could reduce the school dropout rate) was not properly funded and the government did not take necessary measures against domestic violence.

Presadă supports a new national housing law, to replace and harmonize the plethora of laws and regulations (both national and local) about social housing, emergency housing and other types of public housing. She uses the example of Vulturilor 50, a case in which some families were evicted by the landlords and who were not able to find any social housing in Bucharest.

=== LGBT rights ===
In 2016, Presadă was among the 1,000 signatories of a letter in support of the LGBT community in Romania.
