= Health Education Nature Sustainability Party =

Health, Education, Nature, Sustainability Party Partidul Sănătate, Educație, Natură, Sustenabilitate
- Abbreviation: SENS
- President: Andrei Macsut
- Founded: 28 September 2023
- Headquarters: 23, Camil Ressu Boulevard, Sector 3, Bucharest
- Membership (2025): 1,015
- Ideology: Progressivism; Green politics Left-wing populism
- Political position: Centre-left
- Slogan: Alege ce are SENS pentru tine! ('Choose what makes sense for you!')
- European Parliament: 0 / 33

Election symbol

Website
- www.cusens.eu

The Health, Education, Nature, Sustainability Party (Romanian: Partidul Sănătate, Educație, Natură, Sustenabilitate), commonly known by the abbreviation SENS (meaning "Sense", "Meaning", or "Direction" in Romanian), is an extra-parliamentary political party in Romania closely associated with progressive independent MEP Nicolae Ștefănuță. Amongst its most well known members are Florina Presadă and Ana Ciceală.

As of the 2024 election, it is the biggest party not represented in parliament.

== History ==
SENS was founded by current party president Andrei Macsut in 2023. The party won two seats in the 2024 local elections. The party successfully supported the candidacy of Nicolae Ștefănuță to the European Parliament.

In September 2024, former senator and director of LGBTQ rights organisation ACCEPT Florina Presadă and former Bucharest city councillor Ana Ciceală joined the party.

After successfully collecting the required ten thousand signatures, SENS was able to compete in the 2024 parliamentary election. Despite being popular with the youth, the party only won 2.99% of the votes, less than the 5% required to gain representation. SENS also requested independent observation of the recount for the presidential election.

In the 2025 Bucharest mayoral election, SENS' candidate Ana Ciceală got 5.85% of the votes, with 34 239 voters choosing her candidacy.

== Ideology and political positions ==
SENS is a centre-left progressive party and prioritises the protection of the environment, social justice, and social inclusion.

SENS supports the introduction of same-sex civil unions, the systemic tackling of discrimination against the Roma people, and the unconditional right to abortion.

To combat climate change, SENS prioritises the decarbonisation of the Romanian energy system, reforestation, and protection against droughts and floods. The party aims to modernise railroads, encourage eco-friendly public transport, and modernize the Henri Coanda Airport.

With regards to health, the party supports the modernisation of hospitals, the ensured right to abortion in safe conditions, and coverage of therapy by health insurance. Alongside REPER, SENS supports the decriminalization of possession for the purpose of consumption of all psychoactive substances, opposing the Ciolacu cabinet on this issue.

In an Instagram post on 7 October 2024, one year after the October 7 attacks, SENS strongly condemned Israel's military actions in the Gaza Strip, which SENS considers not acts of war, but genocide against Palestinian civilians. On 22 May 2025, on the day of Romanian-Israeli solidarity, only SENS and SOS condemned the placement of the Israeli flag on the building of the Romanian Parliament and organized a pro-Palestinian protest.

== Analysis ==
Political scientist Cristian Pîrvulescu estimated that SENS could obtain more than 5% in the 2024 election, mainly ex-USR voters. He thinks that, through this party, Nicu Ștefănuță is trying to prove to his colleagues in the European Parliament that environmental politics have a future in Romania.

In the last week before the 2024 parliamentary elections, a trend was observed on TikTok that misinformed voters about Călin Georgescu, the winner of the first round of presidential elections (later annulled by the CCR decision of 6 December 2024), that SENS would be the party he supported in the legislative elections. Several cases of votes for SENS from voters of Georgescu, fooled by disinformation on social networks, were reported. The SENS Party denied links to that disinformation campaign.

== Election history ==
=== Legislative elections ===
Election	Chamber			Senate			Position
Election	Votes	%	Seats	Votes	%	Seats	Position
2024	276.494	2.99%	0 / 331	263,135	2.84%	0 / 134	8th

=== Bucharest mayoral election ===
Year	Candidate	Votes	Percent (%)	Place
2025	Ana Ciceală	34.239	5.85%	5

== See also ==
- Romanian Ecologist Party
