= National Union for Innovation and Tradition Party =

National Union for Innovation and Tradition Party Partidul Uniunea Națională pentru Inovație și Tradiție
- Abbreviation: UNIT
- President: Aurora Tasica Simu (Cluj)
- Founder: independent MPs
- Founded: 28 February 2026
- Registered: 9 December 2025
- Split from: Party of Young People
- Ideology: Sovereignism; Anti-establishment; Animal rights Anti-immigration; Big-tent
- Colors: Dark navy Turquoise
- Chamber of Deputies: 4 / 330
- Senate: 0 / 134

Website
- unitpentruromania.ro

The UNIT Party (ro: Partidul UNIT), officially named the National Union for Innovation and Tradition (Romanian: Partidul Uniunea Națională pentru Inovație și Tradiție - Partidul UNIT), is a political party represented in the Parliament of Romania, founded in 2025 by a group of parliamentarians initially elected on the lists of the Party of Young People.

The party was granted legal personality by the Bucharest Tribunal on 9 December 2025. The political formation was founded by several independent parliamentarians, including Aurora Tasica Simu, Dumitrița Albu, Ștefan Borțun, Andrei Csillag and Gheorghe-Petru Pîclișan.

UNIT is represented in Parliament by five parliamentarians, comprising four members of the Chamber of Deputies and one senator, led by Aurora Tasica Simu, a member of the Chamber of Deputies for Cluj County. The party presents itself as a political alternative based on combining traditional and sovereigntist values with modernization and innovation, promoting, among other objectives, economic development, public accountability and the protection of national interests.

== Ideology ==
The UNIT Party defines itself as a centre-right political formation based on the principles of initiative, responsibility, freedom and respect for Romanian traditions. Its political vision seeks to combine social and national conservatism with institutional modernization, economic development and innovation. The party considers the family, traditions and national identity to be fundamental elements of social cohesion, while supporting the adaptation of the state to contemporary economic and technological transformations.

From an economic perspective, UNIT supports a market economy, private enterprise and the development of Romanian capital. Its objectives include supporting small and medium-sized enterprises, reducing taxation on labour, encouraging investment and promoting a strategic industrial policy. The party supports maintaining and developing national companies considered strategic and opposes the transfer of important state assets into private ownership. This approach seeks to combine market economy mechanisms with an active role for the state in protecting national economic interests.

Regarding environmental policies, the party includes sustainable development among its statutory principles and supports an equitable and sustainable market economy. These concerns, combined with its emphasis on tradition, national identity and responsibility towards future generations, outline an eco-conservative dimension within the party's political profile. This perspective emphasizes reconciling economic development with environmental responsibility and the preservation of community values.

Animal protection and welfare represent another area associated with the parliamentary activity of UNIT's leadership. The party's president, Aurora-Tasica Simu, has undertaken parliamentary initiatives and investigations into conditions in shelters for stray animals and the management of public funds allocated to them. On 10 December 2025, she participated as an invited speaker in a debate hosted at the European Parliament, entitled "Safeguarding Stray Dogs in Romania: Transparency, Protection, and the Path toward Humane Solutions". On this occasion, Simu presented a parliamentary report on the situation of animal shelters in Romania, prepared following her investigation and in collaboration with parliamentarians associated with the UNIT Party. The report addressed conditions in animal shelters, alleged cases of animal abuse and the management of public funds allocated to them.

Her involvement in this area was also reflected in legislative activity. In 2026, Aurora-Tasica Simu, together with Dumitrița Albu, Andrei Csillag and Gheorghe-Petru Pîclișan, was among the initiators of legislative proposal PL-x No. 318/2026, submitted alongside parliamentarians from several political parties, concerning amendments to Law No. 205/2004 on animal protection. The proposal seeks to clarify and improve the intervention procedures of police officers serving in animal protection units, as well as to introduce stricter penalties for acts of cruelty promoted online. These initiatives highlight the support for animal protection and welfare demonstrated through the parliamentary activity of the party's representatives.

At the institutional level, the party emphasizes integrity, transparency and political accountability. Its proposals include administrative-territorial reform, reducing the number of members of Parliament to 300, limiting public funding for political parties outside electoral periods and introducing a two-round system for mayoral elections.

Regarding foreign policy, representatives of the party describe themselves as pro-Romanian, pro-European and pro-NATO, while supporting the defence of national interests within European and Euro-Atlantic structures. The party promotes international cooperation while maintaining an emphasis on Romanian state sovereignty and the representation of its interests in international institutions.

On social issues, UNIT emphasizes social cohesion, solidarity and respect for community values, associating tradition with responsibility towards future generations and innovation with the development of education, technology and public administration.

Although the party's published political programme places it within the centre-right political spectrum, the combination of social conservatism, emphasis on sustainable development and concerns regarding animal protection indicates an ideological profile incorporating both conservative and environmental elements. The party's precise ideological positioning is still evolving, as it is a relatively newly established political formation.
