= Mayor of Bucharest =

Romanian municipal official

General Mayor of the Municipality of Bucharest
- Romanian: Primarul General al Municipiului București
- Coat of arms of Bucharest

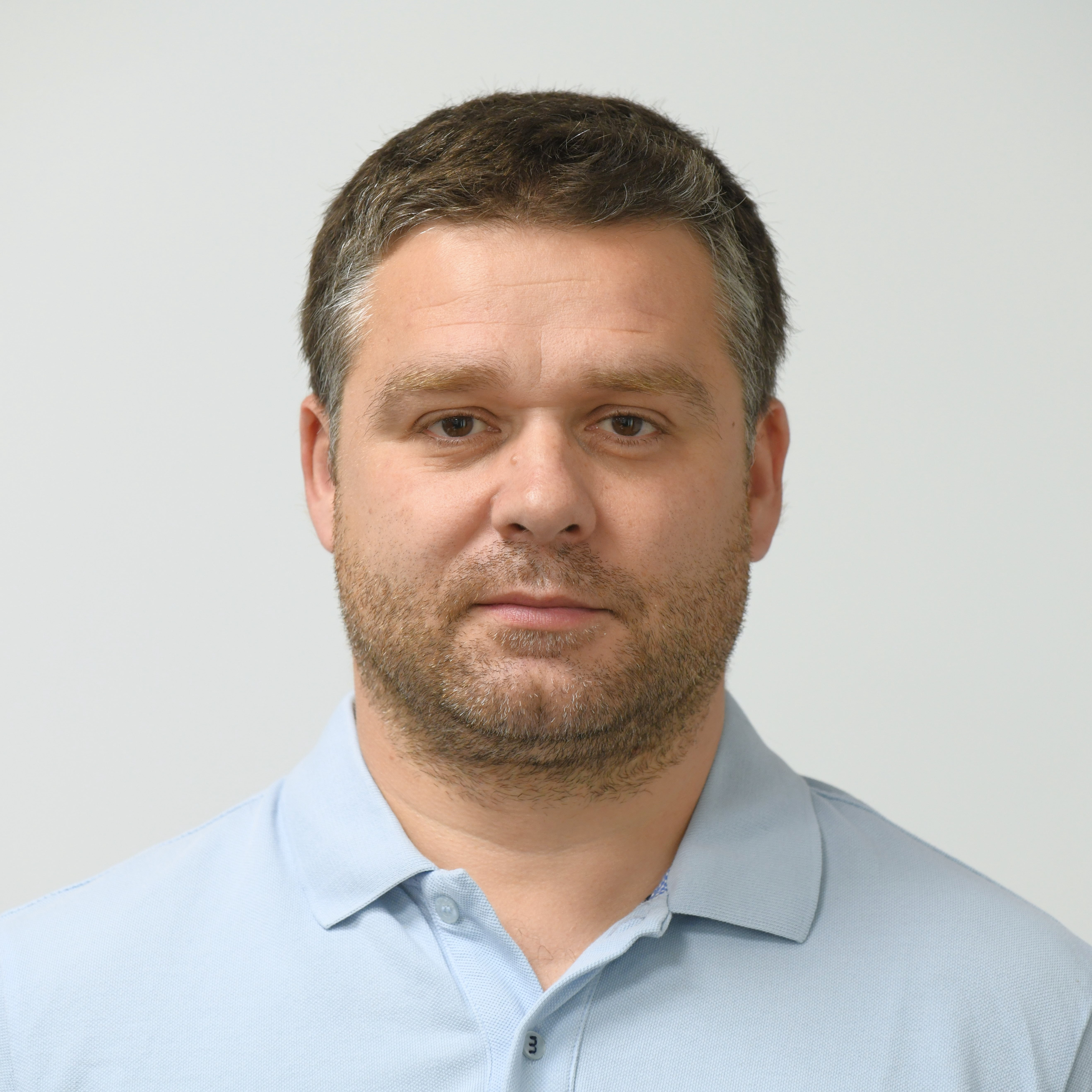
- Incumbent; Ciprian Ciucu since 19 December 2025
- Term length: Four years
- Inaugural holder: General Barbu Vlădoianu
- Formation: 7 August 1864
- Website: http://www.pmb.ro/

The mayor of Bucharest (Romanian: Primarul General al Municipiului București), sometimes known as the general mayor, is the head of the Bucharest City Hall in Bucharest, Romania, which is responsible for citywide affairs, such as the water system, the transport system and the main boulevards. The title of general mayor is sometimes used to distinguish the office from that of the mayors that lead each of Bucharest's six administrative sectors, and which are responsible for local area affairs, such as secondary streets, parks, schools and cleaning services. All decisions of the mayor have to be approved by the 55-seat General Council of Bucharest.

The office was created on 7 August 1864, when a new French-style local administration law was adopted.

The two before last elections saw Sorin Oprescu elected as mayor of Bucharest, for the first time in June 2008 and afterwards for a second term in June 2012. On 6 September 2015, Sorin Oprescu was detained on suspicion of corruption and bribery charges.

On 15 September 2015, he was replaced by a general council elected deputy-mayor for the remainder of his term which ended the following year.

On 5 June 2016, Gabriela Firea was elected mayor with 246,553 votes (42.97%) and she was sworn in on 23 June.

On 27 September 2020, Nicușor Dan was elected Mayor with 282,631 votes (42,82%) and he was sworn in on 29 October.

On 9 June 2024, Dan was re-elected as Mayor of Bucharest with 352,734 votes (47.94%) and started his new term in October, planning to focus more on the traffic problems of Bucharest, while renewing public transport still remains one of his priorities. On 18 May 2025, Dan was elected President of Romania, and took his office on 26 May, being replaced by Stelian Bujduveanu as acting Mayor of Bucharest.

On 7 December 2025, Ciprian Ciucu was elected Mayor with 211,562 votes (36.16%) in a snap election to fill Dan's vacant office. He was sworn in on 19 December 2025.

== See also ==
- List of mayors of Bucharest
