= S.O.S. Romania =

Political party in Romania

S.O.S. Romania S.O.S. România
- Abbreviation: SOS RO
- President: Diana Șoșoacă
- Founders: Gabriel Gib; Adeluța Gib; Maricel Viziteu
- Founded: 23 November 2021
- Split from: Romanian Socialist Party; Alliance for the Union of Romanians
- Headquarters: Strada Modrogan, Nr. 6, Sector 1, Bucharest
- Ideology: Romanian ultranationalism; Social conservatism; Right-wing populism; Hard Euroscepticism
- Political position: Far-right
- European Parliament group: Non-Inscrits (since 2024)
- Colours: Navy blue Light blue
- Slogan: Un popor unit nu poate fi învins (A united people can't be defeated)
- Senate: 0 / 135
- Chamber of Deputies: 13 / 330
- European Parliament: 1 / 33
- Local councils: 149 / 39,900

Website
- sosro.ro

S.O.S. Romania (Romanian: S.O.S. România) is a far-right political party in Romania, founded on 23 November 2021 by Maricel Viziteu and spouses Gabriel and Adeluța Gib. Gabriel Gib was previously a member of the Romanian Socialist Party and a candidate for the Senate of Romania on PSR's Vâlcea County lists. As of 2026, the party is centered around Diana Șoșoacă, a prominent far-right former political activist and present member of the European Parliament and president of S.O.S.

De jure, S.O.S. Romania is right-wing populist and socially conservative. Informally, the party is considered even more radical than the Alliance for the Union of Romanians, the right-wing powerhouse of the Parliament of Romania and the party from which S.O.S. split. Members of it have been constantly tied to the neo-Legionary movement in Romania and to Russia, which it activelly supports in the Russo-Ukrainian war. Like AUR, it is a supporter of the unification of Moldova and Romania, albeit more vocal and more violent in this matter.

The party retains 15 seats in the Chamber of Deputies, the lower house of the Parliament, but is not represented directly in the Senate, the upper house, since 2025. S.O.S. is represented in the Senate by PACE, a parliamentary group made out of S.O.S. and POT senators.

Although PACE is allegedly pro-European, S.O.S. is strongly Eurosceptic, supporting Romania's withdrawal from both the European Union and NATO. President Diana Șoșoacă was elected in the European Parliament for Romania in 2024 and stands as an independent since S.O.S. is not part of any European party. Since then, she has been the center of several scandals which led to her immunity being stripped in 2026.

== History ==
The party was founded in November 2021 by Maricel Viziteu and Adeluța and Gabriel Gib, the latter being a former member of the Romanian Socialist Party (PSR). It became known on the Romanian political landscape in May 2022 after senator Diana Șoșoacă, elected on the Alliance for the Union of Romanians (AUR) list, joined the party and later became its leader.

Political analyst and former politician Miron Mitrea stated that the party had a support level of 5–6% in the election polls as of July 2023. Șoșoacă replied that its support level was much higher and told people not to trust the polls.

On 13 October 2023, S.O.S. Romania expressed its intention to join the Identity and Democracy Party in the European Parliament. However, it was later reported the S.O.S. Romania would join an alliance led by Alternative for Germany instead. On 28 June 2024, the Alternative for Germany declined the application of S.O.S. Romania to join their European Parliament group, with the Hungarian nationalist party Our Homeland Movement stating that this was at their request.

== Political views ==
Diana Șoșoacă, leader of S.O.S. România, espouses a cluster of far-right nationalist, sovereigntist and populist positions that have increasingly stirred controversy. She has vocally called for Romania's withdrawal from the European Union (RO‑Exit), characterizing EU membership as destructive, and has denounced NATO as an institution that drags Romania into unnecessary conflicts. Although her party professes to oppose "Russian and Chinese dictatorships" and claims the label "Eurorealist" rather than Eurosceptic, Șoșoacă herself has openly embraced pro‑Russian posturing—visiting the Russian embassy in Bucharest multiple times, including on Russia Day, and even writing an open letter to Vladimir Putin urging the "return" of territories she asserts historically belong to Romania.

Her rhetoric extends to irredentist demands, advocating for the denunciation of the 1997 treaty with Ukraine and asserting claims over Northern Bukovina, Bessarabia, Budjak, and Snake Island—an initiative Ukraine responded to with a three‑year entry ban for her. Post-pandemic, she gained notoriety opposing COVID-19 restrictions and vaccines; she later carried this confrontational style into the European Parliament, where she disparaged the institution as undemocratic and staged theatrical protests, once even voting in folk costume while displaying religious imagery and waving criticisms at EU officials. Her combative tone and pro‑Russian and antisemitic rhetoric led to her disqualification from the 2024 and 2025 presidential races by Romania's Constitutional Court, which cited her statements as incompatible with the duties of the presidency. Ideologically, her platform has been characterized as Romanian nationalism, ultranationalism, Romanian irredentism, social conservatism, sovereigntism, right-wing populism, Russophilia, and hard Euroscepticism.

== Electoral history ==
=== Legislative elections - Chamber of Deputies ===
Election	Party leader	Performance					Rank	Government
Election	Party leader	Votes	%	± pp	Seats	+/–	Rank	Government
2024	Diana Șoșoacă	679,923	7.36	New	28 / 331	New	5th	Opposition

=== Legislative elections - Senate of Romania ===
Election	Party leader	Performance					Rank	Government
Election	Party leader	Votes	%	± pp	Seats	+/–	Rank	Government
2024	Diana Șoșoacă	718,415	7.76	New	12 / 134	New	5th	Opposition

=== European elections ===
Election	List leader	Votes	%	Seats	+/–	EP Group
2024	Diana Șoșoacă	450,040	5.03 (#5)	2 / 33	New	NI
