= 2024 Romanian parliamentary election =

- 1 December 2024

All 134 (Note: 2 of the 136 seats in the Senate were unassigned, due to no candidates running in the election from POT in Giurgiu and Ialomița counties) seats in the Senate All 331 seats in the Chamber of Deputies 68 S and 166 D seats needed for a majority
- Registered: 19,503,273
- Turnout: 52.50% (▲20.55 pp)
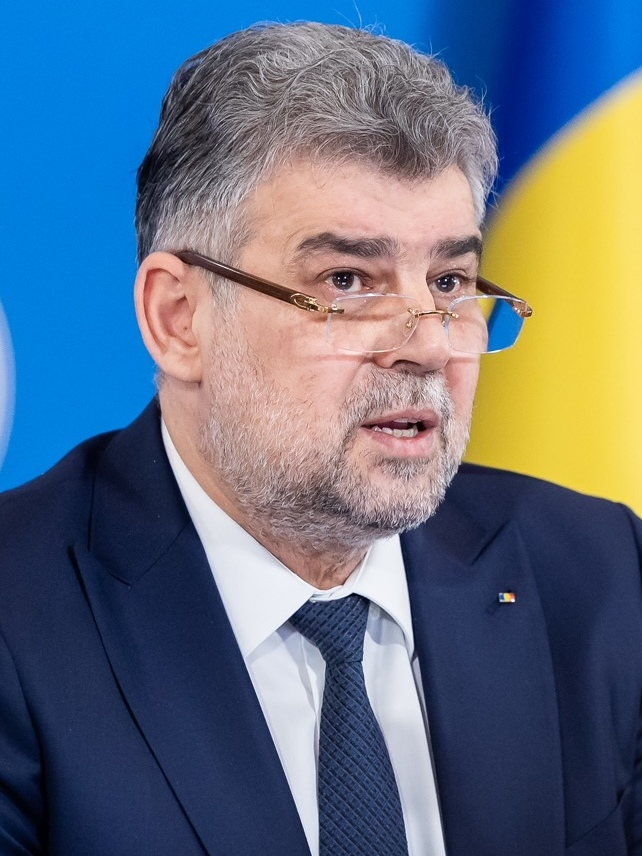

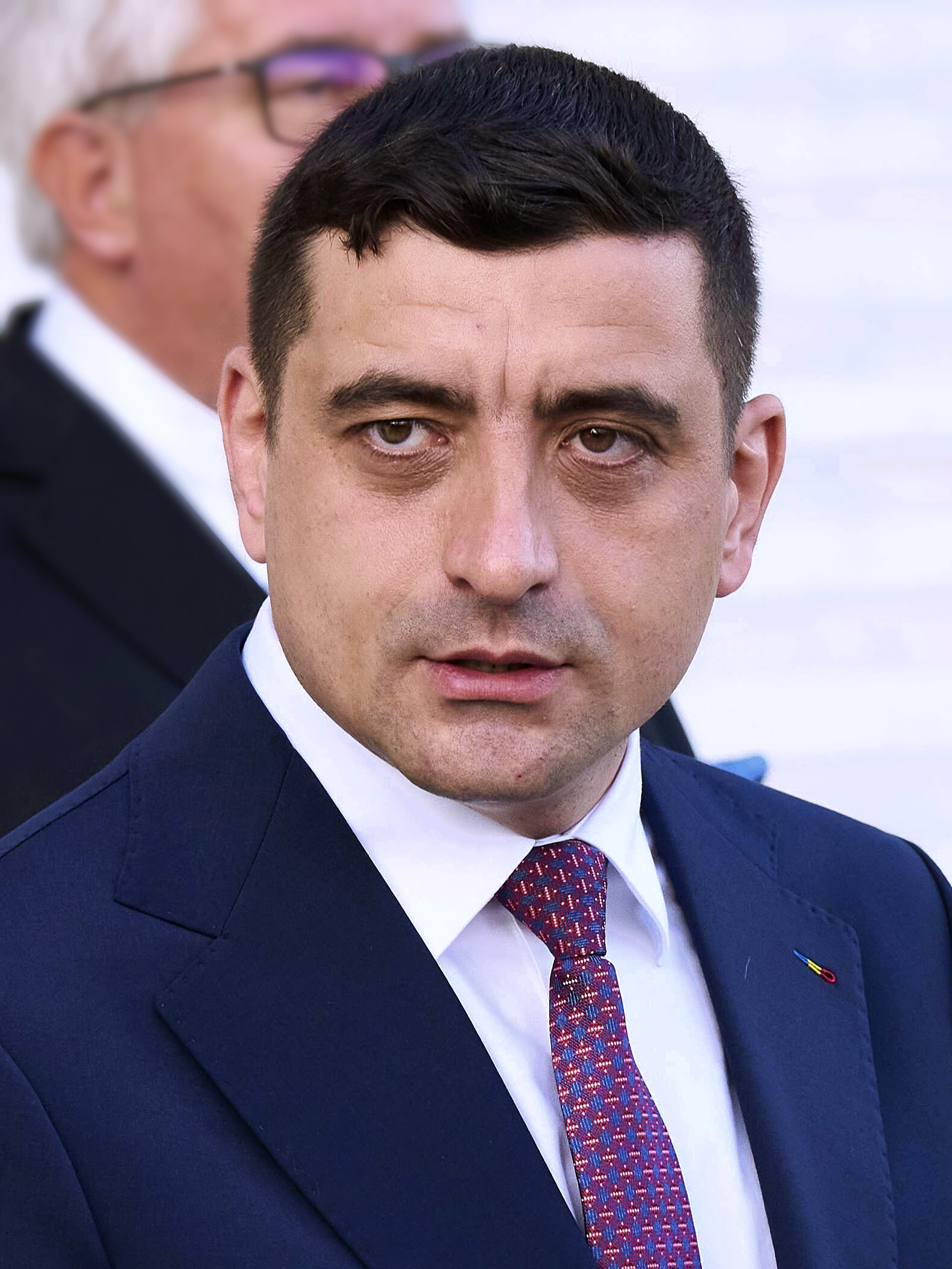

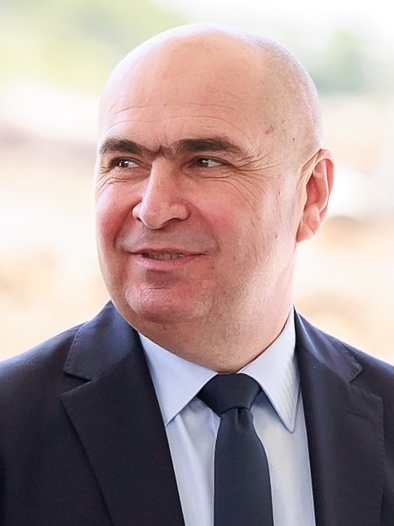

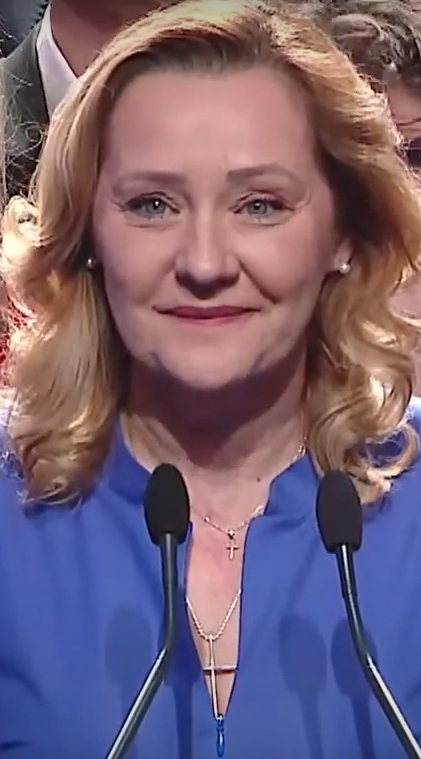

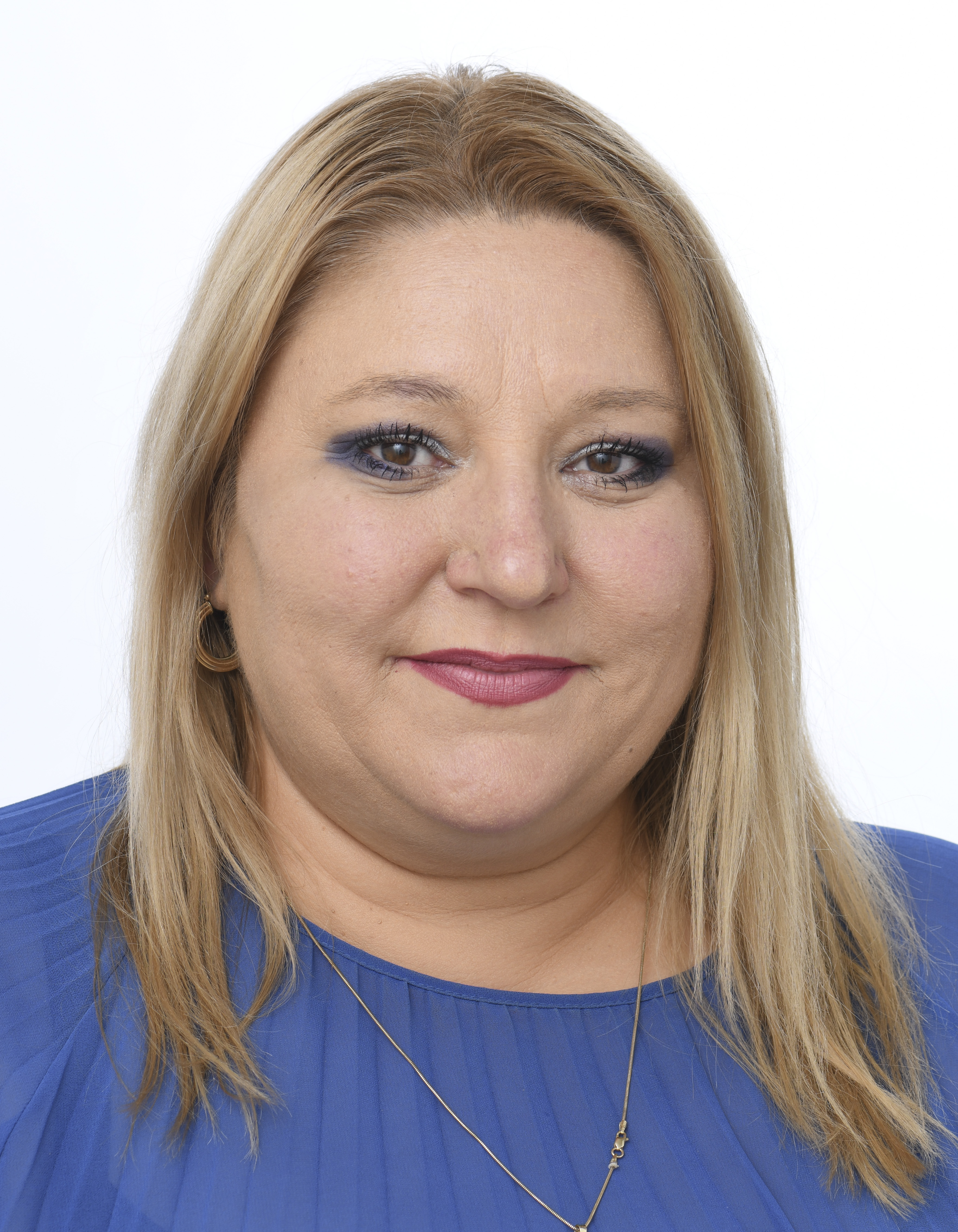

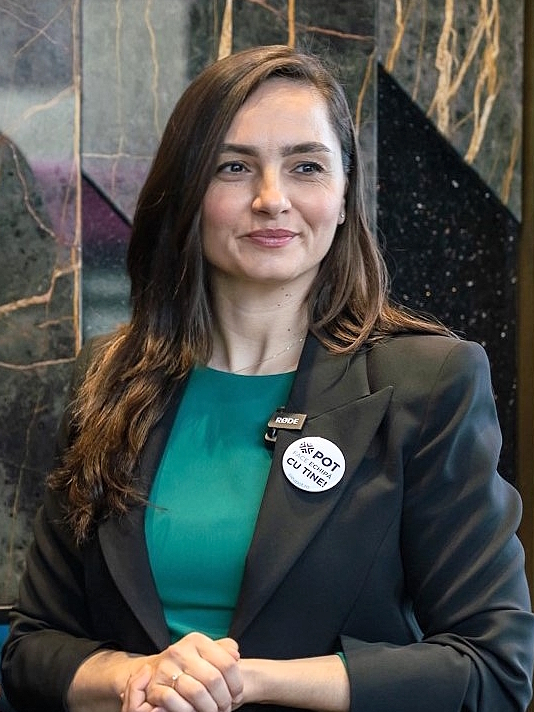

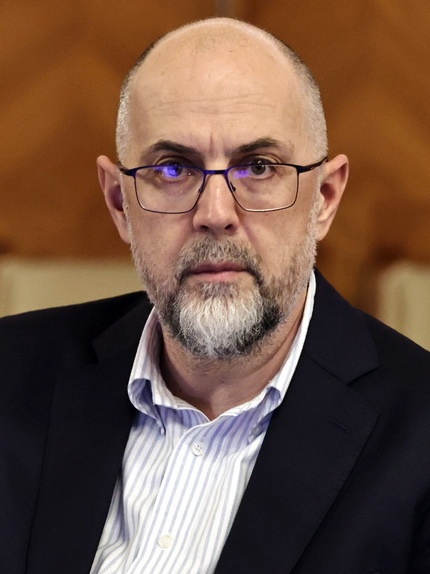

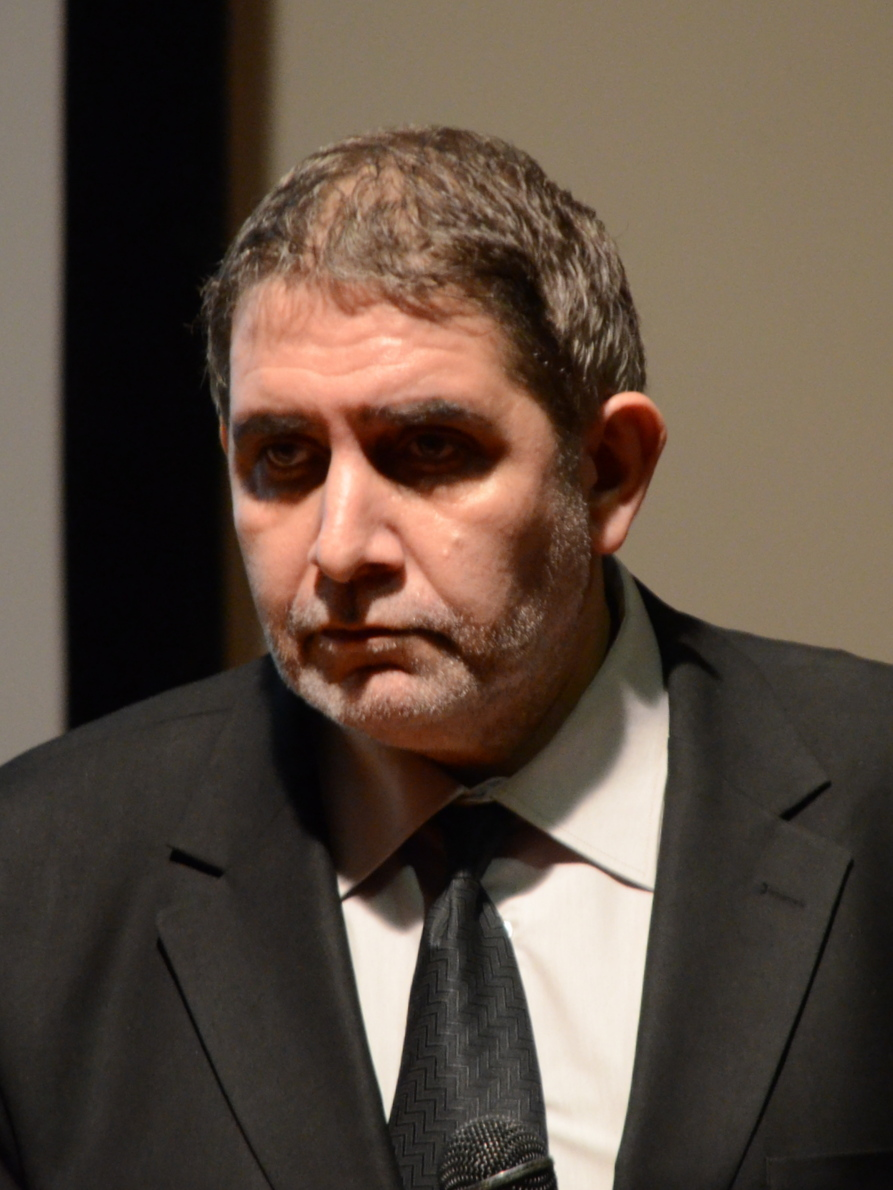
	First party	Second party	Third party
Leader	Marcel Ciolacu	George Simion	Ilie Bolojan
Party	PSD	AUR	PNL
Leader's seat	D – Buzău	D – Bucharest	S – Bihor
Last election	47 S / 110 D	14 S / 33 D	41 S / 93 D
Seats after	36 S / 86 D	28 S / 63 D	22 S / 49 D
Seat change	▼10 S / ▼24 D	▲14 S / ▲30 D	▼19 S / ▼44 D
Popular vote	2,030,144	1,665,143	1,219,810
Percentage	21.96%	18.01%	13.20%
Swing	▼6.94 pp	▲8.93 pp	▼11.99 pp
	Fourth party	Fifth party	Sixth party
Leader	Elena Lasconi	Diana Șoșoacă	Anamaria Gavrilă
Party	USR	SOS RO	POT
Leader's seat	Did not stand (Note: Standing for President in the presidential election)	S – Bucharest	D – Hunedoara
Last election	25 S / 55 D	New	New
Seats after	19 S / 40 D	12 S / 28 D	7 (Note: Initially won 9 seats, but did not have any candidates for Giurgiu and Ialomita counties. The 2 seats were left vacant.) S / 24 D
Seat change	▼6 S / ▼15 D	New	New
Popular vote	1,146,357	679,967	596,745
Percentage	12.40%	7.36%	6.46%
Swing	▼2.97 pp	New	New
	Seventh party	Eighth party
Leader	Hunor Kelemen	Varujan Pambuccian (Note: Pambuccian, a member of the Union of Armenians of Romania, has been the parliamentary leader of the national minorities' group since 1996.)
Party	UDMR	Minority parties
Leader's seat	D – Harghita	D – Nationwide (Note: National minorities have nationwide mandates and do not represent a specific county.)
Last election	9 S / 21 D	0 S / 18 D
Seats after	10 S / 22 D	0 S / 19 D
Seat change	▲1 S / ▲1 D	0 S / ▲1 D
Popular vote	585,397	129,282
Percentage	6.33%	1.40%
Swing	▲0.59 pp	▼0.27 pp
Prime Minister before election
Marcel Ciolacu
PSD
Prime Minister after election
Marcel Ciolacu
PSD

Parliamentary elections were held in Romania on 1 December 2024. No party won a majority in the election, which saw the incumbent National Coalition for Romania (CNR), led by the Social Democratic Party (PSD) and the National Liberal Party (PNL), lose their majority in both chambers of parliament alongside significant gains by far-right parties such as the Alliance for the Union of Romanians (AUR), S.O.S. Romania (SOS), and the Party of Young People (POT). Following the elections, a pro-European grand coalition government was formed between the PSD, the PNL, and the Democratic Union of Hungarians in Romania (UDMR/RMDSZ), with the support of the national minorities. On 23 December, Ciolacu's second cabinet was inaugurated by a slim margin, with 240 votes out of 465 in favour.

== Background ==
=== Cîțu Cabinet ===
Following the previous legislative elections held in December 2020, the Cîțu Cabinet was appointed, backed by a centre-right coalition of three Romanian political parliamentary parties: the conservative liberal National Liberal Party (PNL), the progressive liberal/neoliberal USR PLUS (which subsequently switched back to the old USR acronym in late 2021), and the Hungarian minority-oriented Democratic Union of Hungarians in Romania (UDMR/RMDSZ).

In September 2021, a major rift within the coalition led to the onset of the 2021 Romanian political crisis. Prime Minister Cîțu, with the backing of President Klaus Iohannis, sacked Justice minister Stelian Ion. All the other USR ministers withdrew from the government by 7 September 2021, which left the Cîțu Cabinet in the minority. It subsequently fell in November 2021 in an unparalleled motion of no confidence (the highest number of votes against a government in the political history of post-1989 Romania).

=== National Coalition for Romania ===
The political crisis ended with the formation of a grand coalition. As a result, the Ciucă Cabinet, backed by the National Coalition for Romania (CNR) comprising the PNL, PSD, and the UDMR/RMDSZ, was formed and remained in power until June 2023, when the latter of the three parties withdrew from the majority. On 15 June 2023, as part of the rotation government deal, the National Liberals made way for the Social Democratic-led First Ciolacu cabinet.

=== 9 June elections ===
Foreshadowing the elections in December, the 2024 European Parliament and local elections took place on 9 June. The two governing parties formed an electoral alliance in the European Parliament election, as well as in some constituencies in the local elections. The results were seen as a victory for the CNR, although the PNL suffered many losses to their coalition partners in races where they ran separately. The newly formed United Right Alliance (ADU) registered significant losses, with the People's Movement Party (PMP) losing 88% of its mayors and the Save Romania Union (USR) losing key races in Brașov, as well as Bucharest, particularly Sectors 1 and 2, where the mayoral candidates who lost their seats claimed that electoral fraud took place. The USR's poor performance led to the resignation of Cătălin Drulă as party president and his replacement by Câmpulung mayor Elena Lasconi.

=== 24 November presidential elections ===
The election is taking place amid political uncertainty caused by the results of the first round of the 2024 Romanian presidential election on 24 November, during which independent candidate Călin Georgescu and the USR's Elena Lasconi advanced to the runoff scheduled on 8 December at the expense of Prime Minister Marcel Ciolacu of the PSD and Nicolae Ciucă of the PNL. On 6 December, the Constitutional Court of Romania annulled the first round of the election, as it came out that Georgescu received around €1,000,000 in illegal funding. Alleged Russian state interference in the election was widely reported.

== Timeline ==
=== Date of the election ===
Both parliamentary and presidential terms were scheduled to end in late 2024. After consulting the various parliamentary groups, the Ciolacu Government announced that the parliamentary elections would take place on 1 December, with the presidential elections taking place around the same time (first round on 24 November, second round on 8 December), making 2024 the first time for such an electoral concatenation in Romania since the 2004 general election.

The election date also coincides with Great Union Day, the Romanian national holiday.

=== Timetable ===
Date	Event
7 September	Deadline for the Permanent Electoral Authority to communicate to the Central Electoral Bureau the number of registered voters.
10 September	Deadline for parties to file for the creation of electoral alliances.
2 October	Deadline for political parties, electoral alliances and organisations representing national minorities to file their candidates list.
17 October	Deadline for independents to file for their candidacy. Deadline for Romanians abroad to register to vote.
22 October	Deadline for political parties, alliances and organisations representing national minorities to choose their symbols.
30 October	The order in which the candidates will appear on the ballot is determined by a random draw in each constituency.
1 November	The start of the electoral campaign.
16 November	Deadline for manufacturing official ballots and stamps.
28 November	Deadline for receiving mail votes.
30 November	The end of the electoral campaign. Voting at polling stations abroad began at 7:00 a.m. local time.
1 December	Voting in Romania began at 7:00 a.m.

== Electoral system ==
Palace of the Parliament

Both the 331 members of the Chamber of Deputies as well as the 136 members of the Senate are elected in 43 multi-member constituencies based on Romania's 41 counties, the Municipality of Bucharest, as well as the Romanian diaspora using party-list proportional representation. Law no. 208/2015 outlines that each constituency is to be awarded one deputy every 73,000 people and one senator every 168,000 people in accordance with the population data collected on 1 January of the previous year by the National Institute of Statistics (INS). Constituencies cannot have less than 4 deputies and 2 senators.

Parties must pass a threshold of 5% of the national vote or at least 20% of the vote in four constituencies. Electoral alliances must pass a higher threshold, namely 8% for those with two member-parties, 9% for three and 10% for alliances of more. Further seats (currently 18) can be added in the Chamber of Deputies for ethnic minority groups that compete in the elections and pass a lower threshold (5% of the votes needed to win a seat in the lower chamber, calculated by dividing the number of votes of parties, alliances and independent candidates that passed the threshold by the amount of seats that they won).

Following the elections, seats are allocated to the candidates of successful parties and lists in several stages, starting with constituencies, where seats are distributed according to the Hare quota of the constituency. Unused votes are then transferred and congregated at the national level, where remaining seats are distributed using the D'Hondt method, to ensure overall proportionality between a party's national vote share and its share of parliamentary seats. These remaining seats are then allocated to party candidates within the constituencies, based on the party results in each constituencies.

Constituencies	Allocated deputies	Allocated senators
Bucharest	29	13
Iași	12	5
Constanța, Prahova	11	5
Bacău, Cluj, Dolj, Suceava, Timiș	10	4
Argeș, Bihor, Brașov, Galați	9	4
Mureș	8	4
Neamț	8	3
Arad, Buzău, Dâmbovița, Maramureș, Vaslui	7	3
Botoșani, Hunedoara, Sibiu, Olt	6	3
Vâlcea	6	2
Alba, Bistrița-Năsăud, Brăila, Caraș-Severin, Gorj, Harghita, Ilfov, Satu Mare, Teleorman, Vrancea	5	2
Călărași, Covasna, Giurgiu, Ialomița, Mehedinți, Sălaj, Tulcea, Romanian diaspora	4	2

== Parties and alliances ==
=== Parliamentary composition ===
Party	Ideology	Leader(s)	Initial seating (Note: as per the 2020 results)		Current seats	Government		
Party	Ideology	Leader(s)	Votes	Seats	Current seats	Cîțu (2020–2021)	Ciucă (2021–2023)	Ciolacu I (2023–2024)
PSD	Social democracy Social conservatism	Marcel Ciolacu	28.9% (D); 29.3% (S)	110 / 330 47 / 136	103 / 330 49 / 136	Opposition	Coalition (CNR)	
PNL	Conservatism; Pro-Europeanism	Nicolae Ciucă	25.1% (D); 25.5% (S)	93 / 330 41 / 136	79 / 330 37 / 136	Coalition	Coalition (CNR)	
USR	Social liberalism Pro-Europeanism	Elena Lasconi	15.3% (D); 16.0% (S)	55 / 330 25 / 136	41 / 330 20 / 136	Coalition	Opposition	
AUR	Romanian nationalism Right-wing populism	George Simion	9.0% (D); 9.1% (S)	33 / 330 14 / 136	26 / 330 12 / 136	Opposition		
UDMR (RMDSZ)	Hungarian minority interests	Hunor Kelemen	5.7% (D); 5.8% (S)	21 / 330 9 / 136	20 / 330 9 / 136	Coalition	Coalition (CNR)	Opposition
FD	Christian democracy	Ludovic Orban	New	Split from PNL	16 / 330 3 / 136	—	Opposition	
REPER	Liberalism	Dragoș Pîslaru; Ramona Strugariu	New	Split from USR	10 / 330 2 / 136	—	Opposition	
PUSL	Social conservatism	Daniel Ionașcu	1.0% (D); 1.1% (S)	0 / 330 0 / 136	4 / 330 1 / 136	—	Confidence and supply agreement (parliamentary support for the CNR)	
NR	Ultranationalism	Ninel Peia	New	Split from AUR	4 / 330 1 / 136	Opposition		
Romania in Action	Centrism; Romanian patriotism	Mihai Apostolache	new	–	2 / 330 2 / 136	Opposition		
Independents or others	—	—	7.57% (D); 0.85% (S)	18 / 330 0 / 136	25 / 330 1 / 136	—		
Vacant seats	—	—	—		0 / 330 1 / 136	—		

=== New political parties ===
In July 2021, the nationalist Romanian Village Party (RoSAT), led by Marian Vișu-Iliescu, was launched, claiming to represent the interests of peasants, ignored by the major parties.

On 19 September 2021, former PSD president Liviu Dragnea, along with former ally Codrin Ștefănescu, launched the Alliance for the Homeland (Romanian: Alianța pentru Patrie, ApP), a split-off from PSD and "an alternative" to it according to both.

On 3 October 2021, former PNL Prime Minister Ludovic Orban, who had just been defeated for the leadership of the PNL by Florin Cîțu at the 2021 PNL party congress, stated that he is willing "to create a new political construction which would be ready to continue PNL's legacy". In this regard, at that time it was thought that he could be following Călin Popescu-Tăriceanu, another former national liberal Prime Minister who subsequently left the PNL in order to establish his own political party, more specifically the Liberal Reformist Party (PLR), subsequently known as the Alliance of Liberals and Democrats (ALDE) after its merger with the Conservative Party (PC), a now defunct political party which was eventually absorbed by the PNL during late March 2022.

In addition, before further concrete steps on behalf of Orban, various commentators stated that Orban's faction could part ways with the main PNL should he not be designated PM after Cîțu's dismissal by the Parliament (which also occurred in the meantime). Subsequently, after PNL started negotiations with the PSD, more and more MPs resigned from the PNL and joined Orban's faction in the Parliament. Orban's new party was officially registered in December 2021 and is called "Force of the Right" (or FD for short).

In November 2021, a new party called NOW (Romanian: ACUM) was formed. It has a progressive and green ideology.

Additionally, in November 2021 the S.O.S. Romania party was founded by Maricel Viziteu, Adeluța and Gabriel Gib. However, it became later known on the Romanian political scene in May 2022, after senator Diana Iovanovici Șoșoacă, elected on the Alliance for the Union of Romanians (AUR) list, joined the party, and eventually became its leader.

Former PSD president and Prime Minister Viorica Dăncilă has, in the meantime, became president of the Nation People Together (NOI) party.

After the March 2022 congress of the Alliance for the Union of Romanians, Dan Grăjdeanu, the president of the Orthodox Brotherhood NGO, announced that his NGO will end the collaboration with AUR and launch its own political party. On 17 April 2022, a party affiliated with the Brotherhood was created: the National Movement. It is led by Mihai Tîrnoveanu.

Former independent/technocratic Prime Minister and PLUS/USR PLUS/USR member (as well as former USR president) Dacian Cioloș officially quit the USR on 31 May 2022 to form a brand new party called REPER. Several MEPs (more specifically 4) who have been previously elected on the lists of the 2020 USR PLUS Alliance at the 2019 European Parliament election in Romania have sided with Dacian Cioloș for his newly established political project, but still remain affiliated with the Renew group in the European Parliament. REPER can thus be considered (and is, in actuality) a splinter of USR.

On 10 July 2022, ex-AUR deputy Mihai Lasca launched his own political party, called Patriots of the Romanian People. The party was labelled as Eurosceptic, Romanian nationalist and anti-LGBT.

The Green Party (PV) was also relaunched under the new name of the Green Party (The Greens) – (Romanian: Partidul Verde – Verzii)). The party is currently led by two co-presidents, more specifically Marius Lazăr and Lavinia Cosma (former USR member between 2016 and 2019). The party first appeared in the polls in the beginning of 2023.

In late September 2023, PNL vice-president and deputy Ben Oni Ardelean resigned from the party and announced that he is initiating a new political project. Consequently, he recently launched an allegedly conservative political party called Hope's Movement (Romanian: Mișcarea Speranței) for the disillusioned electorate in Romania.

Civil society activists announced at the end of November the launch of the Party for Nature, People and Animals (Romanian: Partidul pentru Natură, Oameni și Animale – NOA). The party is temporarily led by Lucian Rad, former county councilor in Brașov.

On September 2, 2024, a group of 10 MP joined a new party called DREPT Party. The party will be led by former independent MEP Vlad Gheorghe.

The progressive Health Education Nature Sustainability Party (SENS), was formed around independent ex-USR MEP Nicolae Ștefănuță, and achieved the necessary 100.000 signatures.

The centrist Romania in Action Party, formed by the supporters of the independent candidate for president Mircea Geoană, managed to collect over 160,000 signatures and will have candidates in all counties as well as in the diaspora.

=== New political alliances ===
In May 2022, the Christian Democratic National Peasants' Party (PNȚCD) announced that it will prepare a new political alliance with the Alliance for the Homeland (ApP, formerly known under the acronym PAINE) for the forthcoming Romanian parliamentary elections scheduled to take place in late 2024. The two parties will allegedly form a so-called "sovereignist" block which will oppose the National Coalition for Romania (CNR). In late August 2022 however, Liviu Dragnea, strongly associated in the past with the party at an unofficial level, had decided to indefinitely distance himself from the ApP.

In June 2023, incumbent USR leader Cătălin Drulă stated that the Save Romania Union (USR) wants to form a right-wing pole able to win the 2024 elections. The alleged right-wing pole is envisaged to form around the USR and become the winner of all the elections scheduled in 2024 in Romania, according to the incumbent USR leader. In these regards, discussions have already been carried out between USR and the People's Movement Party (PMP). The right-wing alliance proposed by the USR is presented as an alternative to the current ruling CNR coalition formed by the Social Democratic Party (PSD) and the National Liberal Party (PNL). The respective right-wing or centre-right alliance/electoral block might also include the Force of the Right (FD). It was later on reported in October 2023 by a USR member that the Force of the Right (FD) will be included in the respective alliance/electoral block at national level as well as the fact that he does not exclude punctual future collaborations on several political measures with the Democratic Union of Hungarians in Romania (UDMR/RMDSZ).

On 4 July 2023, the Socialist Romania Alliance (ARS), formed by the Romanian Socialist Party (PSR) and the Social Democratic Workers' Party (PSDM) was registered. On 23 September 2023, various extra-parliamentary far-right, ultra-nationalist and traditionalist conservative groups announced the creation of the Nationalist Bloc, led by Bogdan Mihai Alecu.

On 14 November 2023, at an AUR press conference, Lidia Vadim-Tudor (the daughter of the late Corneliu Vadim Tudor), former Minister for Business Environment Ilan Laufer (who is also the president of the National Identity Force), businessman Muhammad Murad, entrepreneur Sorin Constantinescu and Sorin Ilieșiu, as well as deputies Florică Calotă (who was elected on PNL list), Daniel Forea (elected on PSD list), Dumitru Viorel Focșa (elected on AUR, but later left) and senators Ovidiu Iosif Florean (elected on PNL list), Călin Gheorghe Matieș (elected on PSD list) and Vasilică Potecă (elected on PNL list) announced that they are joining AUR for the next election. Later, on 21 November, AUR announced, together with the Romanian Village Party, National Rebirth Alliance, Romanian Republican Party and National Peasants' Alliance the creation of a Sovereigntist Alliance to contest at the 2024 Romanian parliamentary election.

On 25 November 2023, several extra-parliamentary political parties announced the creation of the Romanian Sovereigntist Bloc, which includes: Right Republican Party, Romanian Nationhood Party, Coalition for the Nation, Reformist Party, Homeland Party, Christian Social Popular Union Party. On 9 December 2023, leaders of Green Party (PV) and Ecologist Party of Romania (PER) announced a new political alliance on political scene for 2024 European Parliament elections, AER for Romania. On 14 December, Save Romania Union (USR), Force of the Right (FD), and the People's Movement Party (PMP) officially announced the creation of a right-wing electoral alliance to contest in the 2024 elections. On 18 December 2023, the alliance was formally named as United Right Alliance (ADU).

On 14 March 2024, the Christian Democratic National Peasants' Party (PNȚCD) formed an alliance with the Strong Romania Party (PRP). On 24 September 2024, Renewing Romania's European Project (REPER), the Democracy and Solidarity Party (DEMOS), the NOW Party (ACUM), and independents launched the Platform for Democracy, Prosperity, and Progress, a cross-spectrum alliance of pro-European and progressive parties. Volt Romania (VOLT) also joined this alliance.

=== Party-lists running ===
The following party-lists will be on the ballot in December:

Note that not all the parties listed below submitted lists of candidates in all the counties. Also, the independent candidates can run only in one county.

List	Party	Abbr.	Ideology	Alliance with
01.	National Liberal Party	PNL	Christian democracy Social conservatism	
02.	Force of the Right	FD	Liberal conservatism Christian democracy	PMP, AD, PNȚMM
03.	Social Democratic Party	PSD	Social democracy Social conservatism	PUSL, PRO
04.	Democratic Union of Hungarians in Romania	UDMR; RMDSZ	Hungarian minority interests Social conservatism	AMT, MPE
05.	Save Romania Union	USR	Liberalism; Anti-corruption	
06.	Alliance for the Union of Romanians	AUR	Ultranationalism; Christian right	BUN
07.	United Social Democratic Party	PSDU	Social democracy Christian democracy	
08.	Patriots of the Romanian People	PPR	Conservatism; Sovereignism	
09.	Renewing Romania's European Project	REPER	Liberalism; Progressivism	Demos, ACUM, Volt
10.	Alternative for National Dignity	ADN	Nationalism; Populism	
11.	Romanian National Conservative Party	PNCR	National conservatism Christian right	PRR, FIN
12.	Romania in Action Party	România în Acțiune	Localism; Civic nationalism	
13.	National Christian Alliance	ANC	Christian nationalism Sovereignism	
14.	Party of Young People	POT	Right-wing populism Romanian nationalism	
15.	Romanian Ecologist Party	PER	Green conservatism Christian democracy	
16.	Independent Social Democratic Party	PSDi	Social democracy Sovereignism	BSR
17.	United Pensioners' Party	PPU	Pensioners' interests	
18.	Socialist Romania Alliance	ARS	Socialism; Communism	PSR, PSDM, PCRXXI
19.	Justice and Respect in Europe for All Party	DREPT	Centrism; Anti-corruption	CURAJ, ECO, PDU
20.	Health Education Nature Sustainability Party	SENS	Green politics Progressivism	URS.PDF
21.	S.O.S. Romania	SOS RO	Nationalism; Russophilia	
22.	New Romania Party	PNR	Nationalism; Anti-corruption	
23.	Democratic Union of Turkic-Muslim Tatars of Romania	UDTTMR	Ethnic minority parties Minority interests	
24.	Union of Poles of Romania	UPR	Ethnic minority parties Minority interests	
25.	Democratic Turkish Union of Romania	UDTR	Ethnic minority parties Minority interests	
26.	Forum of Czechs in Romania	FCR	Ethnic minority parties Minority interests	
27.	League of Albanians of Romania	ALAR	Ethnic minority parties Minority interests	
28.	Bulgarian Union of Banat–Romania	UBB-R	Ethnic minority parties Minority interests	
29.	Federation of the Jewish Communities in Romania	FCER	Ethnic minority parties Minority interests	
30.	Party of the Roma	PRPE	Ethnic minority parties Minority interests	
31.	Association of Macedonians of Romania	AMR	Ethnic minority parties Minority interests	
32.	Community of the Lipovan Russians in Romania	CRLR	Ethnic minority parties Minority interests	
33.	Hellenic Union of Romania	UER	Ethnic minority parties Minority interests	
34.	Democratic Union of Slovaks and Czechs of Romania	UDSCR	Ethnic minority parties Minority interests	
35.	Cultural Union of Ruthenians of Romania	UCRR	Ethnic minority parties Minority interests	
36.	Democratic Forum of Germans in Romania	FDGR; DFDR	Ethnic minority parties Minority interests	
37.	Union of Armenians of Romania	UAR	Ethnic minority parties Minority interests	
38.	Union of Croats of Romania	UCR	Ethnic minority parties Minority interests	
39.	Union of Serbs of Romania	USR	Ethnic minority parties Minority interests	
40.	Union of the Ukrainians of Romania	UUR	Ethnic minority parties Minority interests	
41.	Association of Italians of Romania	Ro.As.It.	Ethnic minority parties Minority interests	
42.	Independent candidate (IF) Voinea Gheorghe Sorinei		N/A	
43.	Independent candidate (CJ) Sabin Sărmaș		N/A	

== Results ==
The incumbent National Coalition for Romania (PSD and PNL) lost their majority in both chambers in the election, with far-right parties (AUR, SOS RO, and POT) making substantial gains at their expense.

=== Senate ===
Party	Votes	%	Seats	+/–
Social Democratic Party	2,065,087	22.30	36	–11
Alliance for the Union of Romanians	1,694,705	18.30	28	+14
National Liberal Party	1,322,468	14.28	22	–19
Save Romania Union	1,134,831	12.26	19	–6
S.O.S. Romania	718,409	7.76	12	New
Party of Young People	591,927	6.39	7	New
Democratic Union of Hungarians in Romania	590,783	6.38	10	+1
Health Education Nature Sustainability Party	263,173	2.84	0	New
Force of the Right (Note: Alliance of Liberal-Conservative Right Forces (AFDLC))	173,703	1.88	0	New
United Social Democratic Party	164,659	1.78	0	New
Renewing Romania's European Project (Note: Platform for Democracy, Prosperity, and Progress (PDPP))	126,408	1.37	0	New
Justice and Respect in Europe for All Party	114,500	1.24	0	New
Romanian National Conservative Party	50,287	0.54	0	New
Patriots of the Romanian People	48,436	0.52	0	0
Independent Social Democratic Party	41,712	0.45	0	0
Romanian Ecologist Party	38,561	0.42	0	0
National Christian Alliance	31,094	0.34	0	0
Romania in Action Party	30,252	0.33	0	New
New Romania Party	17,203	0.19	0	0
Socialist Romania Alliance	16,256	0.18	0	0
Alternative for National Dignity	10,473	0.11	0	0
National Action League Party	3,838	0.04	0	New
Party of Faithful People	806	0.01	0	0
Patria Party	493	0.01	0	0
Geto-Dacian Union Party	480	0.01	0	0
Christian Democratic National Peasants' Party	371	0.00	0	0
Party of Justice	325	0.00	0	0
Republican Party of Romania	314	0.00	0	0
Green Party	290	0.00	0	0
Phralipe Party of the Roma	287	0.00	0	0
Independents	7,826	0.08	0	0
Total	9,259,957	100.00	134	0
Valid votes	9,259,957	98.41		
Invalid/blank votes	149,557	1.59		
Total votes	9,409,514	100.00		
Registered voters/turnout	19,503,273	48.25		
Source: Permanent Electoral Authority; Seat counts

=== Chamber of Deputies ===
Party	Votes	%	Seats	+/–
Social Democratic Party	2,030,144	21.96	86	–24
Alliance for the Union of Romanians	1,665,143	18.01	63	+30
National Liberal Party	1,219,810	13.20	49	–44
Save Romania Union	1,146,357	12.40	40	–15
S.O.S. Romania	679,967	7.36	28	New
Party of Young People	596,745	6.46	24	New
Democratic Union of Hungarians in Romania	585,397	6.33	22	+1
Health Education Nature Sustainability Party	276,494	2.99	0	New
Force of the Right (Note: Alliance of Liberal-Conservative Right Forces (AFDLC))	189,678	2.05	0	New
United Social Democratic Party	177,137	1.92	0	New
Renewing Romania's European Project (Note: Platform for Democracy, Prosperity, and Progress (PDPP))	114,223	1.24	0	New
Justice and Respect in Europe for All Party	107,474	1.16	0	New
Romanian National Conservative Party	45,687	0.49	0	New
Patriots of the Romanian People	40,960	0.44	0	0
Romanian Ecologist Party	34,641	0.37	0	0
Independent Social Democratic Party	33,372	0.36	0	0
Romania in Action Party	28,504	0.31	0	New
National Christian Alliance	25,789	0.28	0	0
New Romania Party	14,107	0.15	0	0
Party of the Roma "Pro Europa"	13,881	0.15	1	0
Association of Macedonians of Romania	13,800	0.15	1	0
Socialist Romania Alliance	12,849	0.14	0	0
League of Albanians of Romania	9,177	0.10	1	0
Union of the Ukrainians of Romania	8,750	0.09	1	0
Democratic Forum of Germans in Romania	8,577	0.09	1	0
Union of Serbs of Romania	7,962	0.09	1	0
Alternative for National Dignity	7,747	0.08	0	0
Hellenic Union of Romania	7,565	0.08	1	0
Community of the Lipovan Russians in Romania	7,434	0.08	1	0
Democratic Union of Slovaks and Czechs of Romania	7,420	0.08	1	0
Federation of the Jewish Communities in Romania	5,281	0.06	1	0
Bulgarian Union of Banat–Romania	5,089	0.06	1	0
Democratic Union of Turkic-Muslim Tatars of Romania	4,908	0.05	1	0
Union of Armenians of Romania	4,747	0.05	1	0
Cultural Union of Ruthenians of Romania	4,571	0.05	1	0
Democratic Turkish Union of Romania	4,547	0.05	1	0
Union of Croats of Romania	4,413	0.05	1	0
Union of Poles of Romania "Dom Polski"	4,215	0.05	1	0
Association of Italians of Romania	4,128	0.04	1	0
National Action League Party	2,912	0.03	0	New
Forum of Czechs in Romania	2,817	0.03	1	+1
Party of Faithful People	1,143	0.01	0	0
Geto-Dacian Union Party	435	0.00	0	0
Patria Party	391	0.00	0	0
Republican Party of Romania	279	0.00	0	0
Christian Democratic National Peasants' Party	270	0.00	0	0
Green Party	248	0.00	0	0
United Pensioners' Party	229	0.00	0	0
Party of Justice	184	0.00	0	0
Independents	76,043	0.82	0	0
Total	9,243,641	100.00	331	+1
Valid votes	9,243,641	98.17		
Invalid/blank votes	171,877	1.83		
Total votes	9,415,518	100.00		
Registered voters/turnout	19,503,273	48.28		
Source: Permanent Electoral Authority; Seat counts

== Gallery ==
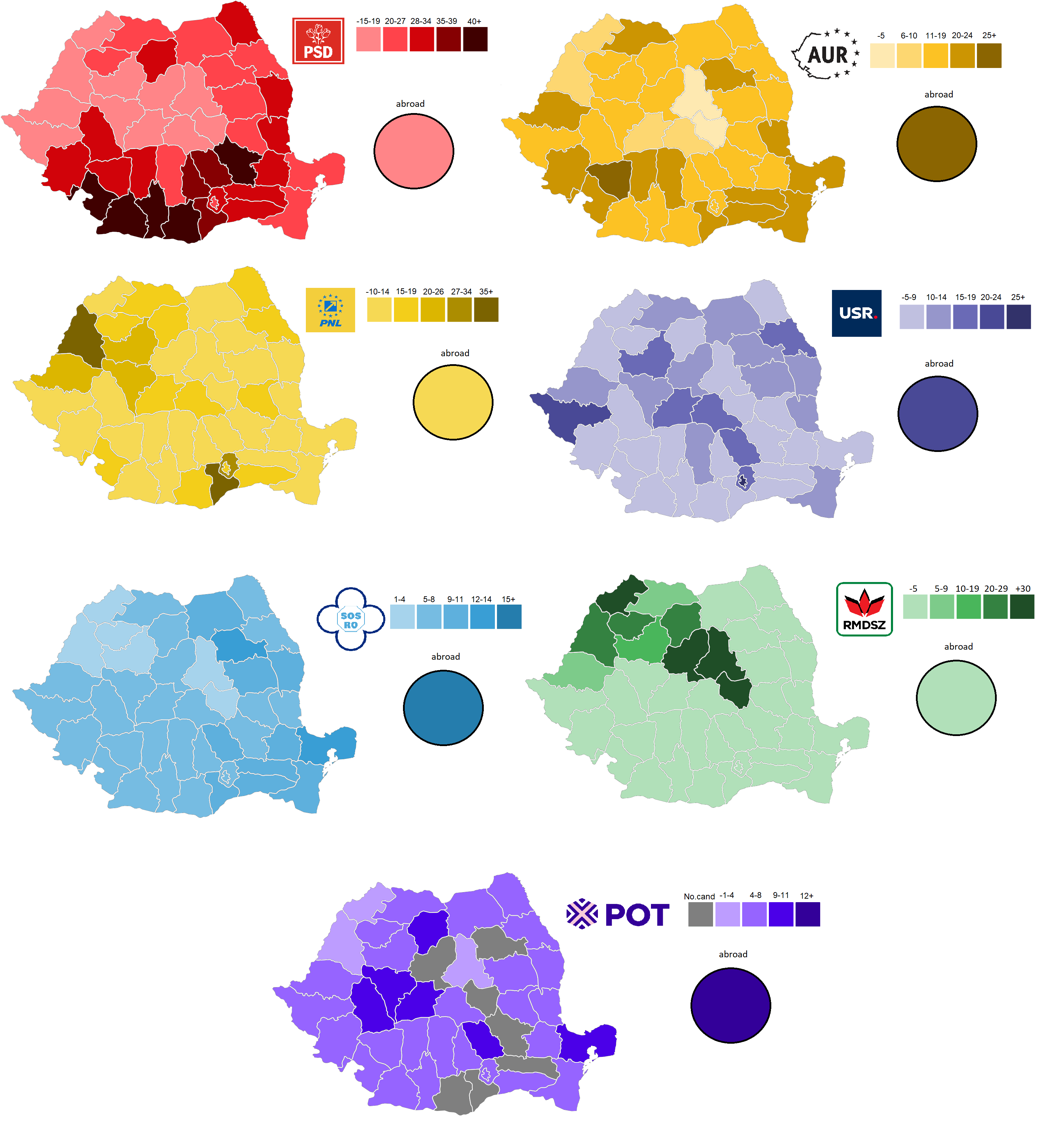
Map depicting the vote strength of each party in each county in the election

== Aftermath ==
Leaders of the Social Democratic Party (PSD), the National Liberal Party (PNL), Save Romania Union (USR), the Democratic Union of Hungarians in Romania (UDMR/RMDSZ), and representatives of national minorities stated that they all have agreed on the need to form a pro-EU coalition and are "committed to Romania's European and Euro-Atlantic values." The agreement was finalised on 10 December.

This agreement was created so that in the case of Călin Georgescu being elected, there would be a firmly pro-EU government to hold him to account. The coalition members endorsed the pro-EU candidate, Elena Lasconi, in the second round, who was supposed to face Georgescu on 8 December before the annulment. This was also an attempt to block the far-right from forming a minority government including AUR, S.O.S. Romania, and POT. Following the annulment of the presidential election by the Constitutional Court, the new government formed after the parliamentary election is expected to set new dates for a presidential vote.

On 10 December, a coalition government was proposed between the PSD, PNL, USR, and UDMR/RMDSZ, alongside national minority parties. However, the PSD threatened to withdraw from the coalition negotiations on 19 December, with Marcel Ciolacu stating that the PSD would vote for a right-wing government in Parliament.

Ultimately, after leaders of the parties met with President Iohannis on 22 December, a coalition agreement was reached between PSD, PNL, and UDMR/RMDSZ, with incumbent prime-minister Marcel Ciolacu staying on for the new government. While this coalition has a majority in the Senate, the national minorities will need to provide confidence and supply in order to reach a majority in the Chamber of Deputies. As per the agreement, PSD holds eight ministries, PNL six, and UDMR/RMDSZ two. Ciolacu's second cabinet was installed on 23 December.
