= Ciprian Ciucu =

Romanian politician, Mayor of Bucharest

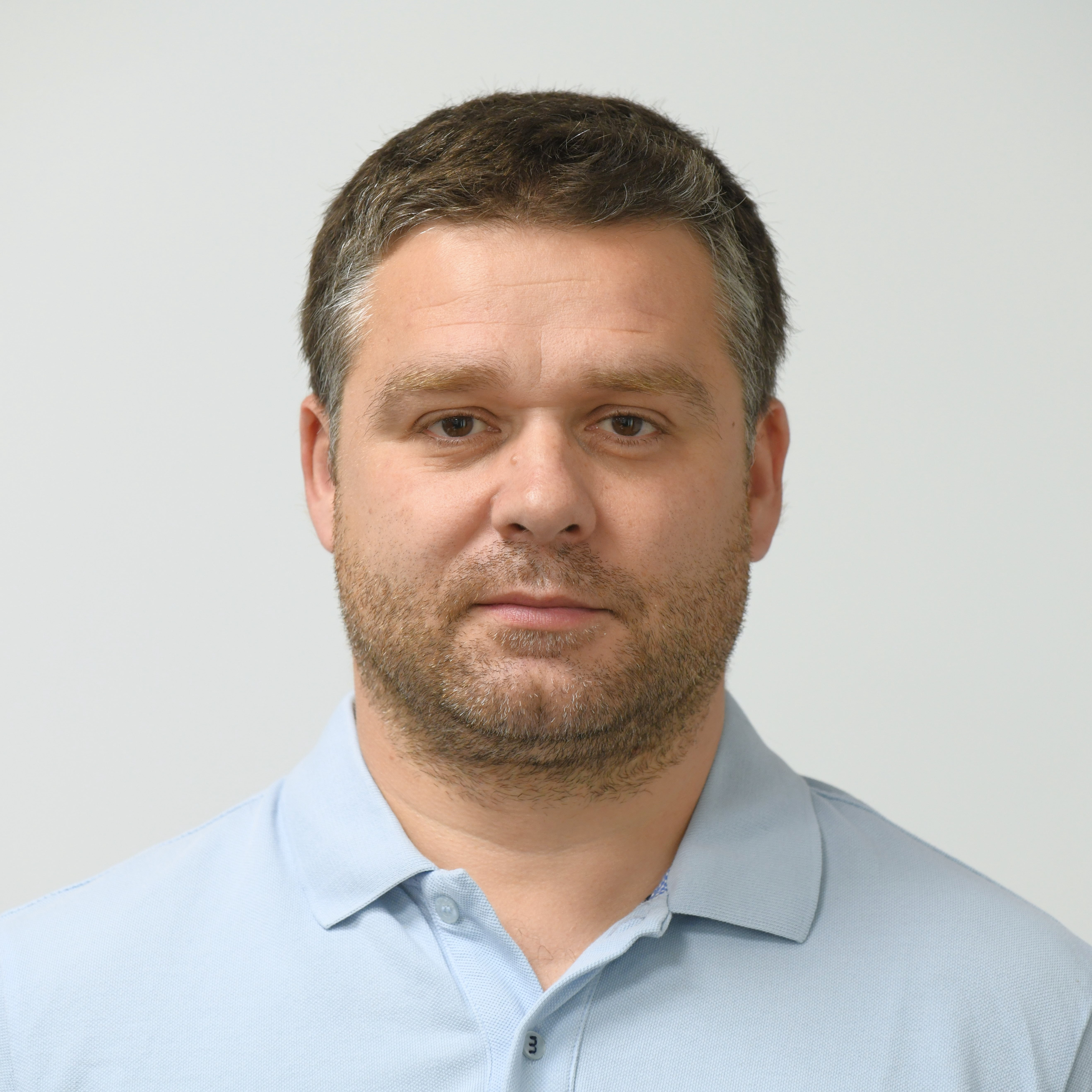
- Ciprian Ciucu in 2023.

84th Mayor of Bucharest
- Incumbent
- Assumed office 19 December 2025
- Preceded by: Nicușor Dan; Stelian Bujduveanu (acting)

Personal details
- Born: 16 March 1978 (age 47) Pitești, Romania

Ciprian Ciucu (born 16 March 1978) is a Romanian politician from the National Liberal Party.

He was elected mayor of Sector 6 of Bucharest in 2020 and again in 2024.

He was elected mayor of Bucharest following the election of December 7, 2025.
