= Sovereigntism =

Ideology supporting political independence of a nation or region

Sovereigntism, sovereignism or souverainism (from French: souverainisme, pronounced [suvʁɛnism]) is the notion of having control over one's conditions of existence, whether at the level of the self, social group, region, nation or globe. Typically used for describing the acquiring or preserving political, economic, cultural and societal independence of a nation or a region, a sovereigntist aims to "take back control" from perceived powerful forces, either against internal subversive minority groups (ethnic, religious, sexual or gender), or from external global governance international institutions, federalism and supranational unions. It generally leans instead toward isolationism and protectionism, and can be associated with certain independence movements, but has also been used to justify violating the independence and territories of other nations.

== Classification ==
Sovereigntism has a cultural as well as political component and can take the form of hostility towards outsiders having different values or different countries or regions of origin. Sovereigntist groups are associated with populism since they typically claim legitimacy for carrying out the sovereign will of the people. While leftist sovereigntists tend to think of their national border as a defensive line against the corrosive effects of neo-liberal, free market economics, right wing sovereigntists see it more as a filter protecting the sovereign people from interference by and inclusion of undesired new entities such as immigrants.

Though there are wide differences in ideology and historical context between sovereigntist movements, those of the twenty first century can be thought of as belonging to three separate categories: conservative sovereigntism, archeo-sovereigntism, and neo-sovereigntism. Conservative sovereignism embraces the national Westphalian model of sovereignty seeking to preserve the interstate order with norms promoting global economic order but halting further advances towards political, cultural, social and economic integration that dilute the sovereignty and identity of the nation and its people. Some vestiges of colonialism remain, with old powers retaining what they see as historical special responsibilities to intervene in former possessions, such as in the case of Russia's invasion of Ukraine. Amongst rising powers, neo-sovereigntism is concerned with issues of autonomism, especially against more privileged nations with concentrated power in transnational entities such as the UN Security Council or G7. It seeks to strengthen norms and agreements protecting the independence of each state, granting their equality, and restraining more powerful states from attempts to influence the behavior of other nations. Archeo-sovereigntism is the most radical, rejecting forces of globalization and restraints on states by transnational bodies, norms and agreements, calling for a return to a pre- World War II order when states were freer from such interference. Examples in Europe include the National Rally in France, the Lega Nord in Italy, the Danish People's Party in Denmark, and the UKIP in the UK.

In a paper published in the European Review of International Studies outlining these three major tendencies, researchers Alles and Badie summarised them thus:

Three coexisting types of sovereigntism in the post-bipolar context
| Contemporary types of sovereigntism | Conception of sovereignty | Claim | Protest | Approach of globalisation |
|---|---|---|---|---|
| Neo-sovereigntism | Self-affirmation | Equality | Hierarchy | Pragmatic |
| Archeo sovereigntism | Specificity | Identity | Globalisation | Antagonist |
| Conservative sovereigntism | Normative | Hierarchy | Emergence of challengers | Selective |

== Sovereigntist populist parties in Europe ==
In Europe, sovereigntist populisms political movements divide (on the one hand) between those that seek to leave the European Union completely (or oppose joining it) and (on the other), those who aim for a "Europe of the nations", a less integrated Europe respecting the individual characteristics and sovereignty of constituent states. Supporters of these doctrines tend to regard themselves as Euro-realists opposed to the Euro-federalists and call for a more confederal version of a European Union. (The European Union is not a federation but shares many characteristics of one.) Thus, sovereigntism in Europe is opposed to federalism and typically involves nationalism, particularly in the United Kingdom (which withdrew from the EU in 2020) and in France where parties on the left and right margins lean strongly towards it.

=== European Union ===
After the 2024 European Parliament election 3 political groups of the European Parliament have been formed which contain sovereignist parties:

- European Conservatives and Reformists
- Europe of Sovereign Nations
- Patriots for Europe

=== France ===
- National Rally (right-wing nationalist)
- The Patriots (Gaullist and right-wing nationalist)
- Popular Republican Union (Big tent Right-wing to Far-right politics)

=== Germany ===
Parties with tendencies that could be described also as sovereigntist can be also found in Germany:

- Alternative for Germany (right-wing, nationalist, conservative)

=== Greece ===
Parties with tendencies that could be described also as sovereigntists can also be found in Greece:

- Golden Dawn (ethnic nationalist, neo-fascist)
- Popular Orthodox Rally (ethnic nationalist, religious conservatism)

=== Hungary ===
Prime Minister Viktor Orbán and his Fidesz party, increasingly followed a sovereigntist policy against the European Union. On December 12, 2023, the Hungarian National Assembly adopted the Sovereignty Protection Act, which created a new government agency, called the Sovereignty Protection Office. It was intended to have broad powers to investigate alleged attacks on Hungarian sovereignty.

=== Italy ===
- Brothers of Italy (National conservatism, Right-wing populism)
- League (Right-wing populism, Euroscepticism)
- Five Star Movement (populist, left-wing populism)
- National Future (Right-wing populism, Euroscepticism)
- Sovereign Popular Democracy (Populism, Euroscepticism)

=== Romania ===
Three sovereigntist parties surpassed the 5% electoral threshold to enter the Parliament of Romania in the 2024 Romanian parliamentary election: the Alliance for the Union of Romanians (AUR), S.O.S. Romania and the Party of Young People (POT).

=== Russia ===
Since 2006, Vladimir Putin has espoused the current Russian sovereigntist view of a political, economic, and cultural battle between sovereign peoples of Russia on one side, and on the other- transnational institutions with their neoliberal and cosmopolitan ideologies undermining Russia's sovereignty and cultural existence. In Putinism, the "national wealth" of the multiethnic Russian peoples (its morality, values, memory of its forefathers and its culture) both defines and is protected by its sovereignty. Putin advisor Vladislav Surkov articulated the threat to "sovereign democracy" posed by international organizations serving the interest of NATO, the OSCE, and the unipolar world order controlled by the United States. According to the ideology of Putinism, Georgian and Ukrainian sovereignty could not be respected since it had already been lost due to their color revolutions, seen as a collapse of borders protecting them from being engulfed culturally, economically and politically by Europe and the West. As a cultural and political protector against threatening Western powers, the idea of a sovereign union of multiple peoples under Russia's leadership has been employed as a legitimation theory for imperial expansion. This usage predates the Soviet Union, tracing back to Pan-Slavism's origins in the 16th century, later becoming integrated with Russian nationalism, imperialism and Orthodox messianism in the 19th century.

=== Spain ===
In the Parliament of Catalonia, parties explicitly supporting independence from Spain are Together for Catalonia (JxCat), heir of the former Democratic Convergence of Catalonia (CDC); Republican Left of Catalonia (ERC), and Popular Unity Candidacy (CUP).

=== United Kingdom ===
Parties with policies that could be described as sovereigntist can be also found in United Kingdom; notably by Reform UK and the Johnson-led Conservative Party (UK) (with respect to the European Union through hard Brexit), the Scottish National Party and Plaid Cymru (Party of Wales), and Sinn Féin in Northern Ireland.

== North America ==
=== Canada ===
In the Canadian province of Quebec, souverainisme or sovereigntism refers to the Quebec sovereignty movement, which argues for Quebec to separate from Canada and become an independent country. Many leaders in the movement, notably René Lévesque, have preferred the terms "sovereignty" and "sovereigntist" over other common names such as separatist or independentist, although this terminology may be objected to by opponents.

==== Quebec ====
- Parti Québécois (centre-left, nationalist and social democratic)
- Bloc Québécois (centre-left, nationalist and social democratic, represents Quebec separatism in Canada's federal parliament)
- Option nationale (centre-left, nationalist and progressive)
- Québec solidaire (left-wing, democratic socialist)

=== United States ===
Coupled with its history of isolationism and sense of American exceptionalism, US sovereigntism is largely a conservative perspective, celebrating both American self-definition and liberty to engage in unilateral action. Sovereigntism in foreign policy is characterized by opposition to multilateral regimes relating to climate change, war crimes, arms control and international declaration of human rights.

The dominant US sovereigntist perspective is currently that of Trumpism and has three dimensions:

- World order and peace is best secured by sovereign states looking after themselves, as opposed to the rules-based international order of interdependent and integrated countries.
- The needs of the American people come first before any other concern of government. Any other prioritization violates the sovereignty of the people.
- Sovereigntism is used partisan weapon, where anyone who differs with Trumpian formulations of sovereignty are identified as political enemies.

A more extreme conservative view of popular sovereignty involves a radical unwinding of centralized government and an expansion of regional sovereignty, where freedoms are controlled at the local level, not adjudicated at the federal level. From the perspective of the Tea Party and continuing among followers of Trumpism, the populist concept of the sovereign people refers exclusively to a specifically defined community that "invites people of different backgrounds to unite under a common 'American' sense of self". Similar to the perspective of Putinism, those individuals who maintain a separate minority identity are not only excluded, but are regarded as a threat to the majority's sovereignty, especially when they seek legal redress for violation of their human rights as defined by constitutional and international norms.

== See also ==
- Autonomism (political doctrine) – Acquiring or preserving political autonomy
- Euroscepticism – Body of criticism of the European Union
- Nationalism – Ideology promoting the nation-state
- Quebec sovereignty movement – Independence movement in Canada
- Regionalism (politics) – Ideology that seeks to promote subnational administrative division interests
- Separatism – Advocacy for separation from a larger group
- Sovereigntism (Puerto Rico) – Movement to achieve sovereignty
- Sovereignty – Supreme authority within a territory
- Suzerainty – Rights and obligations of a dominant state
- Vassal state – State subordinate to another state
