= 2024 Romanian presidential election =

- 24 November 2024 (first round, annulled) (Note: The Constitutional Court annulled the election on 6 December 2024, cancelling the second round of the election scheduled for 8 December 2024.); 8 December 2024 (second round, cancelled)
- Turnout: 52.56% ▲1.38pp
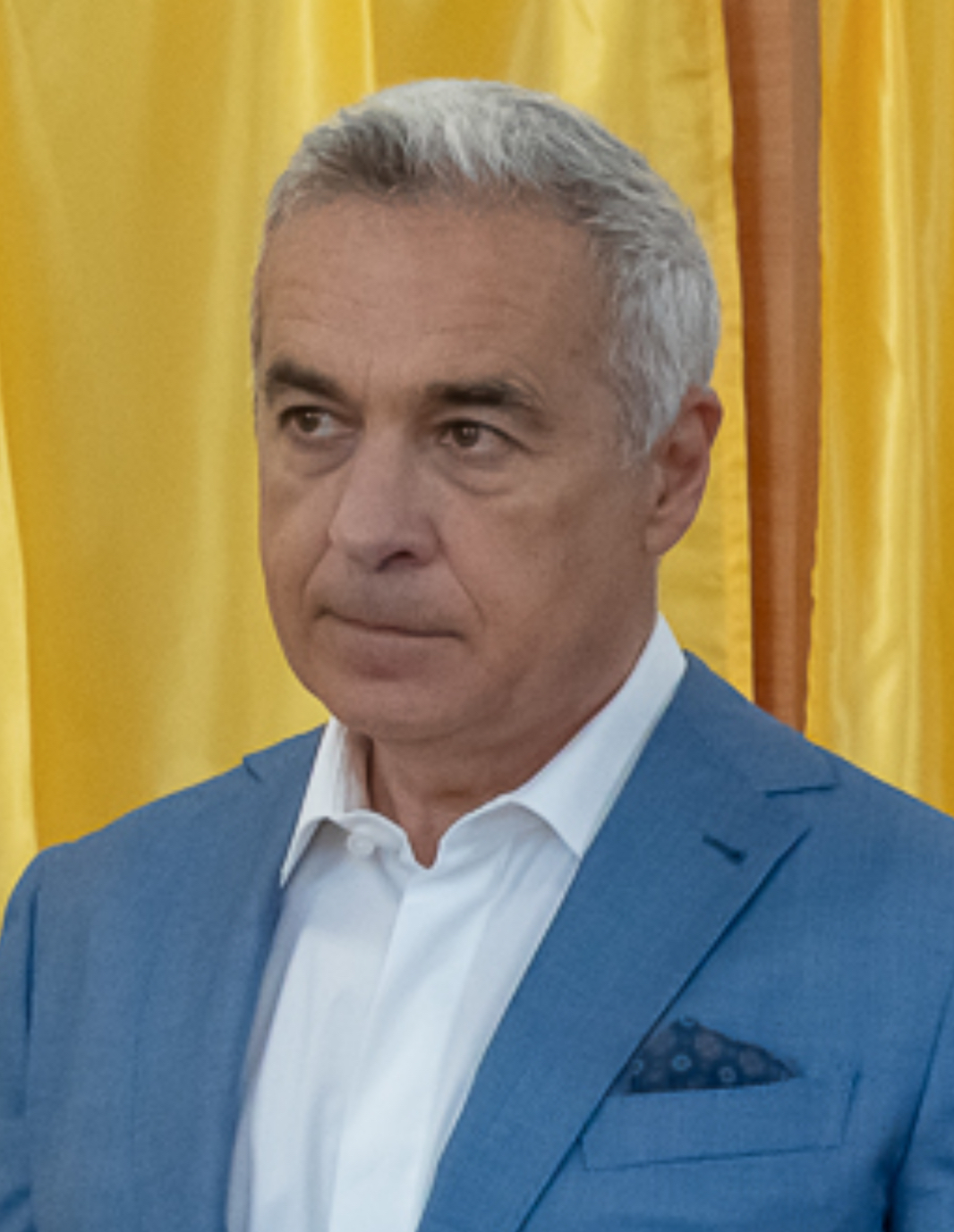

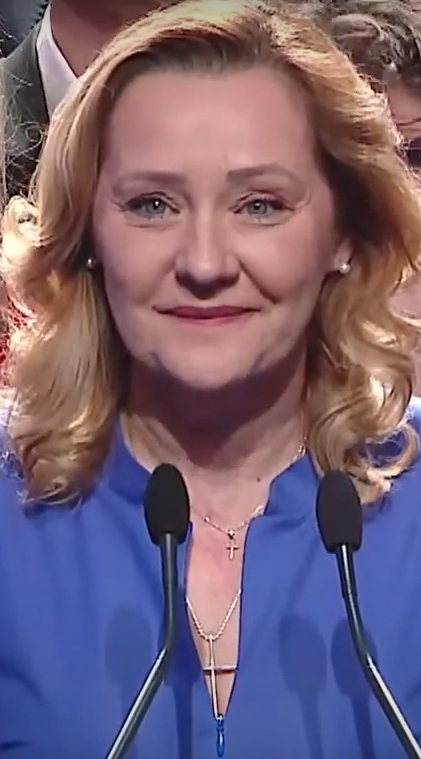

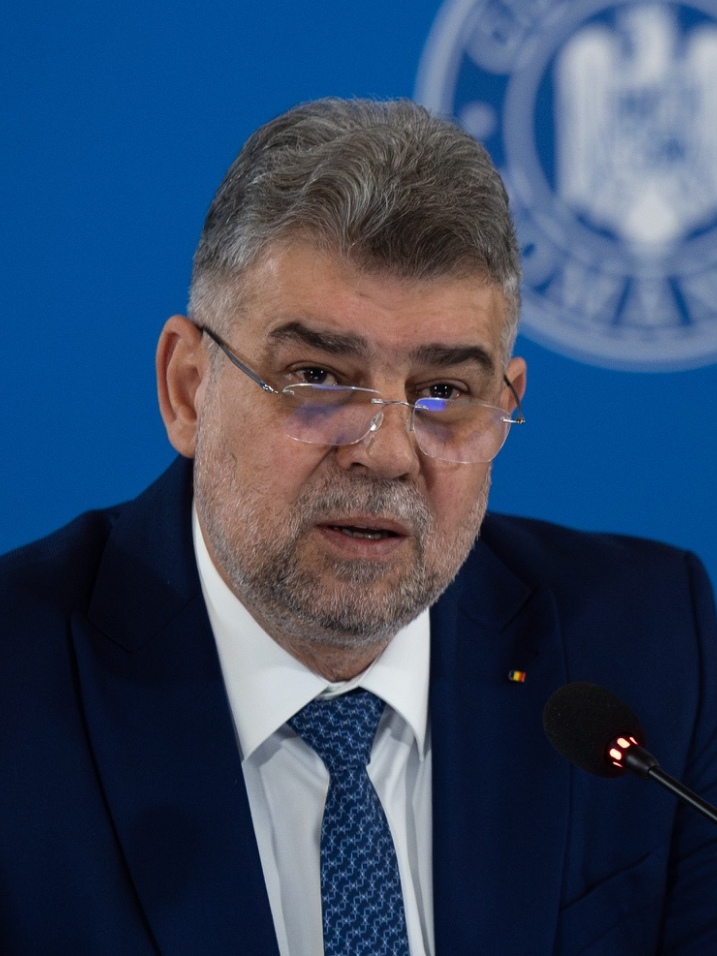

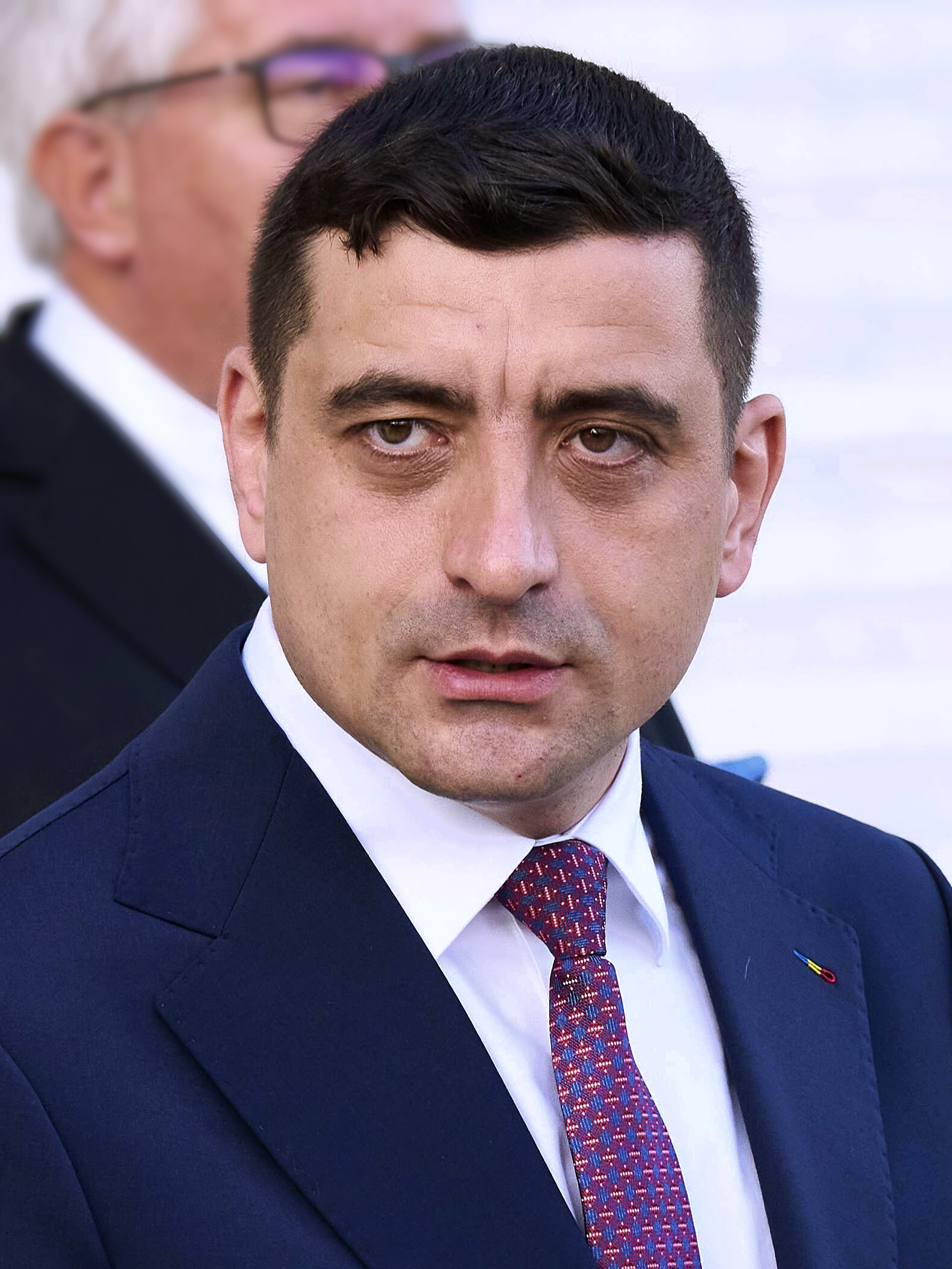

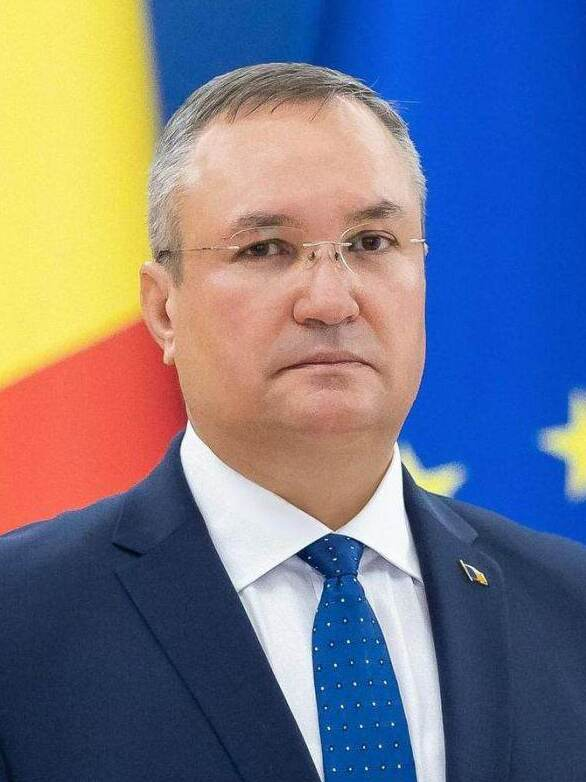

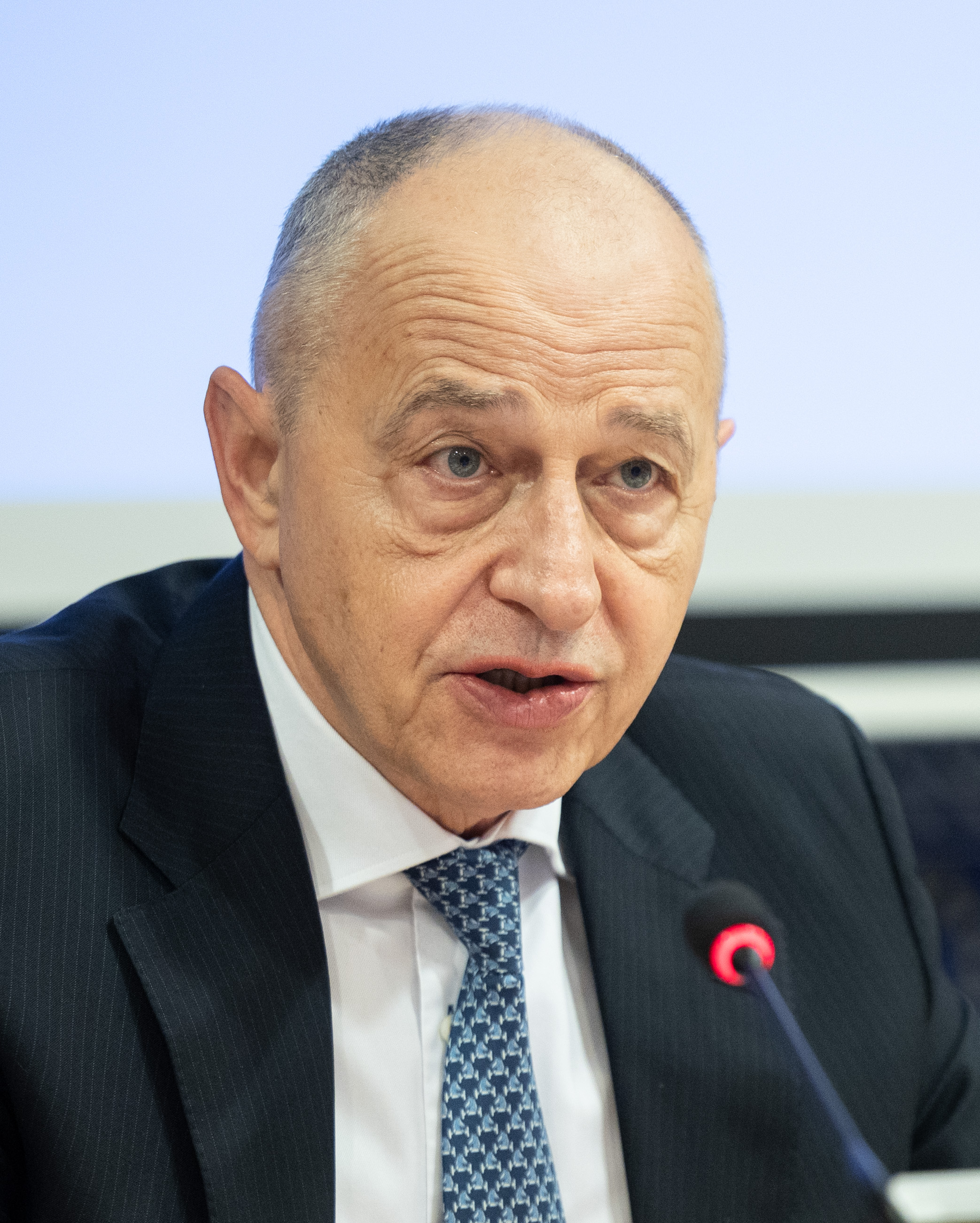
Nominee	Călin Georgescu	Elena Lasconi	Marcel Ciolacu
Party	Independent	USR	PSD
Votes	2,120,401	1,772,500	1,769,760
Percentage	22.94%	19.18%	19.15%
Nominee	George Simion	Nicolae Ciucă	Mircea Geoană
Party	AUR	PNL	Independent
Votes	1,281,325	811,952	583,898
Percentage	13.86%	8.79%	6.32%
President before election
Klaus Iohannis
Independent
Elected President
Election results annulled
Klaus Iohannis remained president until his resignation on 12 February 2025, after which Ilie Bolojan served as acting president

Presidential elections were held in Romania on 24 November 2024. A second round was due to be held on 8 December 2024 as no candidate achieved an absolute majority in the first round; however, the Constitutional Court annulled the election on 6 December 2024, alleging that a Russian influence operation had impacted the vote. This was the ninth presidential election held in post-revolution Romania.

The result of the first round was a surprise, with independent nationalist candidate Călin Georgescu achieving a plurality of votes, while the center-right politician Elena Lasconi finished second and also advanced to the runoff vote. Initially viewed as a minor candidate with little chance of victory, Georgescu quickly gained significant support through campaigning on non-traditional media outlets such as TikTok, receiving particular popularity among those disaffected with current Romanian politics, including youth, farmers, rural voters, and members of the working class. He was considered the front-runner in the race, and polling conducted after the first round of voting found him to be the most popular figure in the country's politics.

Leading issues included corruption, LGBTQ rights, the role of Christianity in public life, and the ongoing Russo-Ukrainian War. Georgescu, who has run on a nationalist platform, has criticised the National Coalition for Romania, a grand coalition of Romania's two largest parties, as corrupt. He has favoured increasing the role of Christianity in public life, promised to outlaw "LGBT propaganda", put forward plans towards partly nationalising important industries, and promoted neutrality and national sovereignty, as well as non-interventionism towards the Ukrainian War, without exiting NATO or the European Union. Lasconi supports secularism, further European integration, alignment with the United States and the West, and increasing military funding towards Ukraine.

Georgescu's campaign has been endorsed by an assortment of Christian democratic, nationalist and agrarian political parties, including the Alliance for the Union of Romanians, S.O.S. Romania, Party of Young People, Romanian Socialist Party and the National Peasants' Party. Lasconi's campaign has been endorsed by the National Liberal Party, Democracy and Solidarity Party, Save Romania Union, and Renewing Romania's European Project, among several other parties. This was the first time since 2000 that a nationalist candidate made it into the second round instead of either the National Liberals or the now defunct Democratic Liberal Party. It was also the first time in the post-Communist period that the Social Democrats failed to reach the run-off.

The aftermath of the first presidential vote was controversial and led Romania to the brink of a political crisis. President Iohannis, who chairs the country's Supreme Council of Defence, accused Georgescu's campaign of being supported by Russia. Following vote rigging allegations made by a minor candidate, the Constitutional Court of Romania ordered a recount, but ultimately decided to confirm the results of the first round on 2 December. On 6 December, the Constitutional Court reversed their decision and controversially annulled the first round of the election, after intelligence documents were declassified stating that Russia had run a coordinated online campaign to promote Georgescu.

On 20 December, an investigation was published contending that the National Liberal Party, one of the governing parties, had paid for the TikTok campaigns that the Supreme Council of National Defence said were "identical" to the online campaign launched by Russia before the invasion of Ukraine and which led to the cancellation of the first round.

== Background ==
Following consultations with various parliamentary groups, the government of Prime Minister Marcel Ciolacu announced on 4 July 2024 that presidential elections would take place later that year on 24 November for a first round and 8 December for a second round. It also set parliamentary elections for 1 December. Prior to this, there was a speculation according to which the forthcoming Romanian presidential elections might have occurred earlier than to term, in the event that incumbent President Klaus Iohannis would have been nominated as Secretary General of NATO and that he would have accepted the nomination in the meantime, then the election would have likely been called earlier than planned. This ultimately did not come to pass, as Dutch former Prime Minister Mark Rutte was chosen to succeed the incumbent Secretary General Jens Stoltenberg.

== Candidates ==
=== National Liberal Party (PNL) ===
President Klaus Iohannis was not eligible for another candidacy, therefore the party sought another suitable candidate. Former Prime Minister and former PNL president Ludovic Orban stated in Tecuci, Galați County, on 22 May 2021, that he did not "rule out" a candidacy in 2024. On 25 June 2021, then-Prime Minister Florin Cîțu stated in Piatra Neamț that he is "currently not considering" a presidential candidacy. Furthermore, fellow party leaders considered proposing Iohannis as Prime Minister after he ceases to be president. On 15 September 2024, Nicolae Ciucă, who was Prime Minister from 2021 to 2023, was formally designated as the PNL candidate for the presidency of Romania.

=== Social Democratic Party (PSD) ===
In a televised talk show on 24 April 2021, the party leader Marcel Ciolacu stated that it would be "very likely" that the party president (himself, at that time) would not run for president in 2024. Asked about considering a presidential candidacy, member of the Chamber of Deputies, Alexandru Rafila vaguely answered on 4 July 2021 "never say never" but underlined that running for president is "definitely not my goal". In another televised talk show, former Prime Minister Sorin Grindeanu stated that the party is "going for the win" in all elections scheduled for 2024 (legislative, local, European Parliament, and presidential), and he "did not rule out" that Mircea Geoană could be again the party's presidential candidate. Geoană ran for president in 2009 but narrowly lost in the second round to Traian Băsescu, who was then re-elected for a second and final term. Speculations were proven clear that Geoană was running for the presidency in 2024 but did not receive PSD support as it was initially believed according to incumbent PSD president Marcel Ciolacu. On 26 August 2024, at the two-day PSD Congress, Ciolacu was officially designated as the party's presidential candidate.

=== Save Romania Union (USR) ===
Former 2019 candidate and party co-president Dan Barna stated in several interviews in April 2021 that his candidacy was "not ruled out" and a "real scenario". Party co-president Dacian Cioloș stated in an interview on 18 February 2021 that he was also considering a potential candidacy. On 1 October 2021, Cioloș stated that his objective was to win the 2024 presidential election. On 26 June 2024, at the two-day USR Congress, Elena Lasconi, the newly elected party president, was officially designated as the party's presidential candidate.

=== People's Movement Party (PMP) ===
Cristian Diaconescu, then newly elected president of the party in early 2021, was designated the party's presidential candidate; however, some analysts believed that Mihail Neamțu, a current member of the PMP, might run instead, either as an independent (with PMP support) or as a candidate from another party. On 23 March 2022, Cristian Diaconescu was excluded from the party by the new leadership, thus losing his presidential candidate status previously granted by the PMP. Diaconescu subsequently filed to run as an independent candidate.

=== Force of the Right (FD) ===
On 28 June 2022, former Prime Minister, former PNL president, and current Force of the Right (FD) leader Ludovic Orban announced that he would run for president in 2024, also stating that he doesn't want to support any other candidate, being tremendously disappointed by the incumbent Klaus Iohannis. Orban was the second former PNL president to run for the Romanian presidency supported by a breakaway faction of the PNL after Călin Popescu-Tăriceanu (Prime Minister between 2004 and 2008) who ran on behalf of the Liberal Reformist Party (PLR; one of the predecessors of the Romanian ALDE founded in 2015 through a merger with the Conservative Party (PC) and subsequently absorbed by the PNL in March 2022) in 2014, during that year's presidential election. On 18 November 2024, during a live TV debate, Ludovic Orban announced his withdrawal from the presidential race and his endorsement to Elena Lasconi, the USR candidate. His late withdrawal kept his name on the ballot and any vote received would still be counted as his. Technically, he continued campaigning but delivered messages of endorsement for Lasconi.

=== Romanian Ecologist Party (PER) ===
PER announced on 28 October 2024 its endorsement for Cristian Diaconescu.

=== Alliance for the Union of Romanians (AUR) ===
The Alliance for the Union of Romanians nominated its leader George Simion.

=== S.O.S. Romania ===
The Constitutional Court of Romania (CCR) notably disqualified far-right and pro-Russia S.O.S. Romania candidate Diana Șoșoacă from running, ruling that her public statements and conduct "systematically" violate the country's constitutional foundation of membership in Euro-Atlantic structures. In response, Șoșoacă claimed "this proves the Americans, Israelis and the European Union have plotted to rig the Romanian election before it has begun". The court's ruling, which was split 5–2 along party lines, was criticised by some for being politically motivated, undemocratic and a result of corruption, including by the PNL, which ended its governing coalition with the PSD as a result of the decision. PNL president Nicolae Ciucă claimed the court's decision showed the involvement of the PSD and endangers democracy in Romania, while PSD president Marcel Ciolacu reacted by saying that the Court should be reformed.

=== Călin Georgescu ===
Călin Georgescu, a Romanian nationalist who is a former member of the AUR, ran as an independent. He primarily conducted his campaigns through TikTok.

=== Candidates previously qualified for the second round ===
These candidates were placed on the first and the second place in the first round, but none of them reached at least 50% of the votes. Thus, they qualified for the second round, to be held on 8 December 2024. The first round was later annulled by the Constitutional Court of Romania, invalidating this second round.

Name	Born	Public office experience	Affiliation and endorsement	Alma mater and profession	Candidacy Announcement dates
Călin Georgescu	26 March 1962 (age 62); Bucharest	Executive director of the United Nations Global Sustainable Index Institute in Geneva (2015–2016); Executive director of the National Center of Sustainable Development (1997–2013); Secretary of State with the Ministry of Environment (c. 2010)	Motto: Refacem România ([We are] Rebuilding Romania); Affiliation: none Endorsed by: POT (both rounds); AUR, PPR (second round)	University of Agronomic Sciences and Veterinary Medicine of Bucharest (1986) Agronomist	Considering the candidacy, endorsed by AUR: 20 November 2021; Declined interest for public office: 18 February 2022 Considering the candidacy, endorsed by PRR: 16 October 2023; Official: 1 September 2024; BEC filing: 1 October 2024; BEC validation: 3 October 2024
Elena Lasconi	20 April 1972 (age 52); Hațeg, Hunedoara County	Mayor of Câmpulung (2020–present)	Motto: O Românie pentru toți, nu doar pentru unii. (A Romania for all, not just for some [people].); Affiliation: USR; Endorsed by:PNL, REPER, FD, PMP, Demos, AD, ACUM, Volt, PNȚ-MM	Faculty of Management, Bucharest Academy of Economic Studies (2001) Economist, journalist	Considering the candidacy: 16 June 2024; Intention: 26 June 2024; Official: 29 June 2024; BEC filing: 1 October 2024; BEC validation: 3 October 2024; CCR rejected validation challenge: 7 October 2024

=== Candidates actively competed only in the first round ===
These candidates' bids were validated by the Central Electoral Bureau (BEC). Some candidacies were challenged by the CCR, but rejected those claims. Excludes a valid candidate that withdrew during the electoral campaign and announced his endorsement to another candidate, while his name remained on the ballot.

Name	Born	Public office experience	Affiliation and endorsement	Alma mater and profession	Candidacy Announcement dates
Ana Birchall	30 August 1973 (age 51); Mizil, Prahova County	Deputy (2012–2020); Minister of Justice (2019); Minister Delegate for European Affairs (2017)	Motto: Mai bine (Better); Affiliation: none	Faculty of Law and International Relations, "Nicolae Titulescu" University (1996) Lawyer	Intention: 18 June 2024; Official: 16 August 2024; BEC filing: 4 October 2024; BEC validation: 6 October 2024
Marcel Ciolacu	28 November 1967 (age 56); Buzău, Buzău County	Prime Minister of Romania (2023–election day); Deputy (2012–election day); President of the Chamber of Deputies (2019–2020, 2021–2023); Deputy Prime Minister (2017–2018); Deputy mayor of Buzău (2008–2012); Acting prefect of Buzău County (2005)	Motto: Calea sigură pentru România (The safe way for Romania); Affiliation: PSD; Endorsed by: PRO Romania, PRPE	Faculty of Law, Ecological University of Bucharest (1995) Jurist, pastry owner	Denied interest: 24 April 2021; Considering the candidacy: 15 March 2023; Intention: 20 August 2024; Official: 24 August 2024; BEC filing: 5 October 2024; CCR rejected bid challenge: 5 October 2024; BEC validation: 6 October 2024; CCR rejected seven validation challenges: four on 7 October 2024and three on 14 October 2024
Nicolae Ciucă	7 February 1967 (age 57); Plenița, Dolj County	President of the Senate of Romania (2023–election day); Senator (2020–election day); Prime Minister of Romania (2021–2023, acting in December 2020); Minister of National Defence (2019–2021); Chief of the Romanian General Staff (2015–2019)	Motto: Cu onoare și credință în slujba țării (In country's service, with honor and faith); Affiliation: PNL	Carol I National Defence University (1995); Nicolae Bălcescu Land Forces Academy (1988) Military	Considering the candidacy: 3 November 2023; Intention: 15 July 2024; Official: 15 September 2024; BEC filing: 2 October 2024; BEC validation: 3 October 2024; CCR rejected two validation challenges: 5 October 2024and 14 October 2024
Cristian Diaconescu	2 July 1959 (age 65); Bucharest	Presidential advisor (2012–2014); Minister of Foreign Affairs (2008–2009; 2012); Senator (2004–2012); Minister of Justice (2004); Secretary of State for European Affairs with Ministry of Foreign Affairs (2004); Secretary of State for Bilateral Affairs with Ministry of Foreign Affairs (2000–2004)	Motto: Pentru România respectată (For [a] respected Romania); Affiliation: Independent Platform Association; Endorsed by: PER	Faculty of Law, University of Bucharest (1983) Lawyer, Diplomat	Intention: 7 March 2021; Official PMP candidate: 7 March 2021; Excluded from PMP: 23 March 2022 Considering the candidacy: 16 July 2024; Official: 8 August 2024; BEC filing: 4 October 2024; BEC validation: 6 October 2024
Mircea Geoană	14 July 1958 (age 66); Bucharest	Deputy Secretary General of NATO (2019–2024); Senator (2004–2016); President of the Senate of Romania (2008–2011); Minister of Foreign Affairs (2000–2004); Romanian Ambassador to USA (1996–2000) Former presidential elections: 2009: 31.15% (2nd place, 1st round), 49.66% (2nd place, 2nd round)	Motto: Viziune. Respect. (Vision. Respect.); Affiliation: none Endorsed by: România Renaște Movement and Romania in Action Party	Faculty of Law, University of Bucharest (1993); Faculty of Mechanics, Politehnica University of Bucharest (1983) Diplomat	Considering the candidacy: 24 November 2023; Intention: 25 August 2024; Official: 11 September 2024; BEC filing: 3 October 2024; BEC validation: 3 October 2024; CCR rejected four validation challenges on: 5 October 2024, 7 October 2024, 9 October 2024 and 14 October 2024
Hunor Kelemen	18 October 1967 (age 57); Cârța, Harghita County	Deputy (2000–election day); Deputy Prime Minister (2020–2023); Minister of Culture (2009–2012; 2014); Secretary of State with the Minister of Culture (1997–2000) Former presidential elections: 2019: 3.87% (6th place); 2014: 3.47% (8th place); 2009: 3.83% (5th place)	Motto: Nimic nu crește când statul se mărește. Alege vocea rațiunii! (Nothing develops when the state enhances. Chose the voice of reason!); Affiliation: UDMR; Endorsed by: AMT, MPE	University of Agricultural Sciences and Veterinary Medicine of Cluj-Napoca (1993); Faculty of Philosophy, Babeș-Bolyai University, Cluj-Napoca (1998) Journalist, poet	Denied interest: 17 January 2023; Intention: 5 September 2024; Official: 6 September 2024; BEC filing: 2 October 2024; BEC validation: 3 October 2024; CCR rejected validation challenge: 5 October 2024
Alexandra Păcuraru	30 June 1987 (age 37); Galați, Galați County		Motto: România se înalță cu demnitate (Romania ascends with dignity); Affiliation: ADN	Faculty of Foreign Languages and Literatures, Dimitrie Cantemir Christian University (2009); Faculty of Cinematography and Television, Media University (2009) TV anchor	Official: 16 September 2024; BEC filing: 5 October 2024; BEC validation: 6 October 2024
Sebastian Popescu	12 February 1982 (age 42); Balș, Olt County	Former presidential elections: 2019: 0.33% (13th place)	Motto: Un președinte în slujba României (A president in Romania's service); Affiliation: New Romania Party	Faculty of Veterinary Medicine, Banat University of Agricultural Sciences and Veterinary Medicine, Timișoara (2006) veterinarian	Intention: 2 April 2024; Official: 20 April 2024; BEC filing: 5 October 2024; BEC validation: 6 October 2024
Silviu Predoiu	5 August 1958 (age 66); Bucharest	Acting chief of Foreign Intelligence Service (2006, 2007)	Motto: Meriți un președinte în serviciul tău! (You deserve a president in your service!); Affiliation: PLAN	Faculty of Geography-Geology, University of Bucharest, Bucharest (1984) Intelligence officer	Considering the candidacy: 16 January 2024; Intention: 23 March 2024; Official: 7 September 2024; BEC filing: 5 October 2024; BEC validation: 6 October 2024
George Simion	21 September 1986 (age 38); Focșani, Vrancea County	Deputy (2020–election day)	Motto: Președintele celor mulți (The president of the many); Affiliation: AUR	Faculty of Business and Administration, University of Bucharest (2008) Civic activist	Denied interest: 27 March 2022; Considering the candidacy: 20 February 2024; Denied interest: 24 February 2024 Considering the candidacy: 7 April 2024; Intention: 11 May 2024; Official: 15 June 2024; BEC filing: 30 September 2024; BEC validation: 30 September 2024; CCR rejected validation challenge: 7 October 2024 Second round: Endorsing Călin Georgescu (25 November 2024)
Cristian Terheș	4 December 1978 (age 45); Zalău, Sălaj County	MEP (2019–election day)	Motto: Credincios națiunii române (Faithful to Romanian nation); Affiliation: PNCR; Endorsed by: FIN, PRR	Faculty of Greek-Catholic Theology, Babeș-Bolyai University (2000); Public Relations Certificate from Fullerton College (2013) Greek-Catholic priest	Considering the candidacy: 25 August 2024; Intention: 31 August 2024; Official: 1 September 2024; BEC filing: 4 October 2024; BEC validation: 6 October 2024

=== Withdrawn candidates ===
These individuals were part of the race in some way and their plans stopped. Some failed to file their bid to BEC, withdrew from the race, or recanted their interest in the presidential office. Here are also included candidates who are no longer in the race due to their bid being rejected by BEC, or whose bid or candidacy were legally barred by the CCR, and a candidate that withdrew during the electoral campaign and announced his endorsement to another candidate, while his name remained on the ballot.

Name	Born	Public office experience	Affiliation and endorsement	Alma mater and profession	Former candidacy Announcement dates
Cristian Badea	(age 41) undisclosed birthplace		Affiliation: New Romania Party	Faculty of Law, West University of Timișoara (2012) Jurist	Intention: 2 April 2024; Lost party primaries: 20 April 2024; Endorsing Sebastian Popescu, after he became party nominee: 20 April 2024
John Ion Banu Muscel	8 July 1960 (age 64); Roman, Neamț County	Former presidential elections: 2019: 0.30% (14th place, last)	Affiliation: Romanian Nation Party	Politehnica University of Bucharest mechanical engineer	Official: 13 April 2024; Last campaign message: 27 August 2024 (post-factum withdrawal confirmed on: 27 October 2024 and switching to run as independent for Parliament as deputy of Argeș County)
Dan Barna	10 July 1975 (age 49); Sibiu, Sibiu County	Deputy (2016–election day); Deputy Prime Minister (2020–2021); Secretary of State with the Ministry of European Funds (2016) Former presidential elections: 2019: 15.02% (3rd place)	Affiliation: USR	Faculty of Law, University of Bucharest (1998) Lawyer	Considering the candidacy: 17 April 2021; Failed to file his bid to party primaries: 27 June 2024; Endorsing Elena Lasconi, after she became party nominee: 29 June 2024
Florin Bădiță-Nistor	26 May 1988 (age 36); Bucharest		Affiliation: none	Faculty of Psychology, Titu Maiorescu University (2010) Civic activist	Considering: 24 July 2024; Intention: 6 August 2024; Failed to file his bid to BEC: 5 October 2024 (post-factum withdrawal confirmed on: 24 October 2024); Endorsing: Elena Lasconi (14 November 2024)
Octavian Berceanu	15 July 1976 (age 48); Bucharest	Senior Non-Key Expert on Afforestation at European Union High-Level Advisors' Mission to the Republic of Moldova (2023-election day); Chief Commissioner of National Guard for the Environmental Protection (2021); General Counsellor of Bucharest (2017–2020); Local Counsellor of Sector 6 (Bucharest) (2016–2017)	Affiliation: Save Romania Union	Faculty of Forestry, Transilvania University of Brașov (1999) Environmental specialist	Intention: 27 June 2024; Lost party primaries: 29 June 2024; Endorsing Elena Lasconi, after she became party nominee: 29 June 2024
Florin Călinescu	29 April 1956 (age 68); Timișoara, Timiș County		Affiliation: PDU	Caragiale National University of Theatre and Film (1979 or 1980) Actor	Intention: 27 February 2024; Failed to file his bid to BEC: 5 October 2024 (post-factum withdrawal confirmed on: 30 October 2024)
Remus Cernea	25 June 1974 (age 50); Bucharest	Deputy (2012–2016) Former presidential elections: 2009: 0.62% (8th place)	Affiliation: none	Faculty of Philosophy, University of Bucharest (2002) Civic activist	Intention: 22 February 2022; Considering: 28 August 2024; Failed to file his bid to BEC: 5 October 2024; Endorsing Kelemen Hunor: 12 October 2024
Dacian Cioloș	27 July 1969 (age 55); Zalău, Sălaj County	MEP (2019–2024); Prime Minister of Romania (2015–2017); European Commissioner for Agriculture and Rural Development (2010–2014); Minister of Agriculture (2007–2008); Ministerial advisor with the Ministry of Agriculture (2005–2007); SAPARD implementation manager with the Representation of the European Commission in Romania (2002–2003)	Affiliation: REPER	Faculty of Horticulture, University of Agricultural Sciences and Veterinary Medicine of Cluj-Napoca (1994) Horticultural engineer	Considering the candidacy (within USR): 18 February 2021; Resigned from USR: 31 May 2022 Considering the candidacy (within REPER): 24 February 2023; Recanted interest for public office: 26 June 2024; Formerly Endorsing: Elena Lasconi, Nicolae Ciucă and Ludovic Orban (16–18 November 2024); Elena Lasconi and Nicolae Ciucă (18–21 November 2024); Endorsing: Elena Lasconi (21 November 2024)
Răzvan Constantinescu	12 July 1967 (age 57); Roman, Neamț County		Affiliation: PPR	Faculty of General Medicine, Grigore T. Popa University of Medicine and Pharmacy, Iași (1992) Gastroenterologist	Intention: 28 March 2024; Official: 1 July 2024; BEC filing: 5 October 2024; BEC rejection: 6 October 2024; Valid signatures: 109.141/200.000 CCR appeal: 6 October 2024; CCR rejection: 7 October 2024; First round: Null vote (11 November 2024)
Brîndușa Covaci	(undisclosed age) undisclosed birthplace		Affiliation: none	undisclosed education undisclosed profession	BEC filing (incomplete and overdue by choice): 9 October 2024 (deadline: 5 October 2024); BEC rejection: 10 October 2024; Valid signatures: 0/200.000
Miron Cozma	25 August 1954 (age 70); Derna, Bihor County		Affiliation: none	Faculty of Mining Equipment, University of Petroșani (1977) mining engineer	BEC filing (incomplete by choice): 1 October 2024; BEC rejection: 3 October 2024; Valid signatures: 0/200.000 CCR appeal: 4 October 2024; CCR rejection: 5 October 2024
Oana Crețu	2 December 1975 (age 48); Bucharest		Affiliation: PSDU	Faculty of Law, Romanian-American University (1999) Lawyer	BEC filing (incomplete by choice): 5 October 2024; BEC rejection: 6 October 2024; Valid signatures: 24.060/200.000; Endorsing: Nicolae Ciucă (19 November 2024)
Cătălin Drulă	2 May 1981 (age 43); Bucharest	Deputy (2016–election day); Minister of Transport and Infrastructure (2020–2021)	Affiliation: USR	Department of Computer Science, University of Toronto (2002) Software Engineer	Considering the candidacy: 5 September 2023; Recanted interest: 10 June 2024; Endorsing Elena Lasconi, after she became party nominee: 29 June 2024
Anamaria Gavrilă	15 October 1983 (age 41); Deva, Hunedoara County	Deputy (2020–election day)	Affiliation: POT	Faculty of Economy and Business Administration, West University of Timișoara (2007) Economist	Official: 30 August 2024; Last campaign message: 23 September 2024 (campaign suspension reveals de facto withdrawal); Endorsing Călin Georgescu: 14 November 2024
Gheorghe Ghelcea	(undisclosed age) undisclosed birthplace (possible Drăgășani, Vâlcea County)		Affiliation: none	"Marin Sorescu" Art High-School, Craiova (undisclosed year) undisclosed profession	BEC filing (incomplete by choice): 4 October 2024; BEC rejection: 6 October 2024; Valid signatures: 0/200.000 CCR appeal: 14 October 2024; CCR rejection: 15 October 2024
Andi Grosaru	4 December 1976 (age 47); Iași, Iași County	Deputy (2016–election day); Administrator RAAPPS-Suceava County (2000–2001)	Affiliation: RO.AS.IT	Faculty of Economy, Università degli Studi di Torino (2004); Police Academy „Alexandru Ioan Cuza" (2005); Faculty of Economic Sciences and Public Administration, Ștefan cel Mare University of Suceava (2006) Economist	Intention: 28 March 2023; Official: 12 August 2024; Last campaign message: 18 September 2024 (campaign suspension reveals de facto withdrawal)
Cozmin Gușă	2 July 1970 (age 54); Câmpia Turzii, Cluj County	Deputy (2004–2008)	Affiliation: none Endorsed by: RoSAT	Faculty of Physics, Babeș-Bolyai University (1994) Physicist	Intention: 18 April 2024; Official: 7 May 2024; Withdrawal: 22 August 2024
Maria Marcu	(undisclosed age) undisclosed birthplace		Affiliation: none	undisclosed education undisclosed profession	BEC filing (incomplete by choice): 5 October 2024; BEC rejection: 6 October 2024; Valid signatures: 1/200.000 CCR appeal: 6 October 2024; CCR rejection: 7 October 2024
Andrei Marga	22 May 1946 (age 78); Bucharest	Minister of Foreign Affairs (2012); Minister of National Education (1997–2000)	Affiliation: none	Faculty of Philosophy, Babeș-Bolyai University (1971) Philosopher	Considering the candidacy: 18 October 2022; Recanted interest: 1 August 2024
Ciprian Mega	24 July 1985 (age 39); Adjud, Vrancea County		Affiliation: none	Faculty of Theology "Andrei Șaguna", Sibiu (2009) Orthodox priest	BEC filing: 5 October 2024; BEC rejection: 6 October 2024; Valid signatures: 176.493/200.000 CCR appeal: 6 October 2024; CCR rejection: 7 October 2024
Petru Mîndru	(undisclosed age); Sărmaș, Harghita County		Affiliation: "Our Romania" Party	Faculty of Geography, Babeș-Bolyai University (undisclosed year) Military	BEC filing (incomplete by choice): 5 October 2024; BEC rejection: 6 October 2024; Valid signatures: 0/200.000 CCR appeal: 8 October 2024; CCR rejection: 8 October 2024
Doina Noghin	born 1945 (age 79); Abrud, Alba County		Affiliation: none	undisclosed education chemist	Official: before 29 July 2004; BEC filing (incomplete and overdue by choice): 22 October 2024 (deadline: 5 October 2024); BEC rejection: 24 October 2024; Valid signatures: 0/200.000 CCR appeal: 29 October 2024; CCR rejection: 29 October 2024
Ludovic Orban	25 May 1963 (age 61); Brașov, Brașov County	Deputy (2008–2016; 2020–election day); President of the Chamber of Deputies (2020–2021); Prime Minister of Romania (2019–2020); Minister of Transport (2007–2008); Deputy Mayor of Bucharest (2004–2007); Secretary of State with the Public Servants Agency (2000–2001); Secretary of State with Public Information Department (1999–2000); General Secretary with Disabled Persons Directorate (1998–1999); Communications Director with Energy Policies Agency (1997–1998); Local counselor, Sector 1, Bucharest (1996–1997); Local counselor, Sector 3, Bucharest (1992–1996)	Motto: Cinstit cu românii (Honest with Romanians); Affiliation: FD; Endorsed by: PMP, AD, PNȚ-MM	Faculty of Industrial Machinery Technology, Transilvania University of Brașov (1988) Technological engineer	Considering the candidacy within PNL: 22 May 2021; Resigned from PNL: 23 November 2021 Considering the candidacy within FD: 14 December 2021; Intention: 29 April 2022; Withdrawal: 2 September 2024 Official: 16 September 2024; BEC filing: 5 October 2024; CCR rejected bid challenge: 5 October 2024; BEC validation: 6 October 2024; CCR rejected validation challenge: 7 October 2024 Withdrawal: 18 November 2024 (due to his late withdrawal, during electoral campaign, his name will still be on the ballot and received votes will be counted as his); Endorsing: Elena Lasconi (18 November 2024)
Aurelian Pavelescu	20 October 1964 (age 60); Lădești, Vâlcea County	Deputy (2004–2008)	Affiliation: PNȚCD	Faculty of Law, University of Bucharest (1997); Faculty of Letters, University of Bucharest (1989) Lawyer	Intention: 14 June 2024; Official: 15 June 2024; Failed to file his bid to BEC: 5 October 2024; First public message that does not mention his presidential bid (de facto Withdrawal confirmation): 9 October 2024
Victor Ponta	20 September 1972 (age 52); Bucharest	Deputy (2004–2020); Prime Minister of Romania (2012–2015); Minister of Parliamentary Relations (2008–2009); Minister-Delegate for Control of International Grant Programmes Implementation and for Monitoring the Application of the Acquis Communautaire (2004); Head of the Government's Control Department (2001–2004); Head of the Bureau for Combating Money Laundering (2000–2001) Former presidential elections: 2014: 40.40% (1st place, 1st round), 45.60% (2nd place, 2nd round)	Affiliation: PRO Romania	Faculty of Law, University of Bucharest (1995) Prosecutor	Considering the candidacy: 27 May 2020; Recanted interest: 5 September 2023; Endorsing Marcel Ciolacu: 25 October 2024
Ion Popa	(undisclosed age) undisclosed birthplace		Affiliation: none	undisclosed education undisclosed profession	BEC filing (incomplete by choice): 4 October 2024; BEC rejection: 6 October 2024; Valid signatures: 0/200.000 CCR appeal: 10 October 2024; CCR rejection: 14 October 2024
Valerian Stan	4 May 1955 (age 69); Sascut, Bacău County	Chief of Government's Control Department (1996–1997)	Affiliation: PNȚ-MM	Nicolae Bălcescu Land Forces Academy (1977); Faculty of Law, University of Bucharest (1987) Human rights activist, Military	Intention: 22 July 2024; Official: 3 August 2024; Withdrawn by his party: 3 October 2024; Excluded from party: 6 October 2024 and party leadership endorsing Ludovic Orban in the first round First round: Boycott (22 October 2024)
Dumitru Stanca	(age 59) undisclosed birthplace		Affiliation: Save Romania Union	undisclosed studies Military	Intention: 27 June 2024; Lost party primaries: 29 June 2024; Endorsing Elena Lasconi, after she became party nominee: 29 June 2024
Diana Iovanovici Șoșoacă	13 November 1975 (age 49); Bucharest	MEP (2024-election day); Senator (2020–2024)	Affiliation: S.O.S.	Faculty of Law, Romanian-American University (possible), undisclosed promotion year Lawyer	Denied interest: 17 February 2021; Considering the candidacy: 15 December 2021; Official: 24 June 2024; First BEC filing: 3 October 2024; BEC validation: 3 October 2024; Bid challenged at CCR: 3 October 2024; First CCR rejection: 5 October 2024 Second BEC filing: 5 October 2024; Final BEC rejection: 6 October 2024 First CCR appeal: 6 October 2024; Second CCR rejection: 7 October 2024 Second CCR appeal: 7 October 2024; Third CCR rejection: 8 October 2024 Third CCR appeal: 11 October 2024; Final CCR rejection: 14 October 2024; First round: Null vote
Eugen Teodorovici	12 August 1971 (age 53); Bucharest	Senator (2012–2020); Minister of Finance (2015, 2018–2019); Minister of European Funds (2012–2015)	Affiliation: BSR	Faculty of Commerce, Academy of Economic Studies, Bucharest (1997) Economist	Considering: 6 February 2023; Intention: 26 November 2023; Failure to file bid to BEC (de facto Withdrawal) confirmed on: 5 October 2024; Endorsing: Marcel Ciolacu (8 November 2024); Endorsing: Călin Georgescu (17 November 2024)
Cristina Tufănoiu	(undisclosed age) undisclosed birthplace		Affiliation: none	undisclosed education undisclosed profession	BEC filing (incomplete by choice): 4 October 2024; BEC rejection: 6 October 2024; Valid signatures: 0/200.000 CCR appeal: 8 October 2024; CCR rejection: 8 October 2024
Elena Tufecciu	(undisclosed age, possible 37) possible birthplace: Tulcea, Tulcea County		Affiliation: AUR (claimed)	Faculty of Banking and Finance Spiru Haret University (2008) Fashionista	BEC filing (incomplete by choice): 4 October 2024; BEC rejection: 6 October 2024; Valid signatures: 0/200.000
Oana Zăvoranu	16 June 1973 (age 51); Bucharest		Affiliation: none	Faculty of Law, Titu Maiorescu University (2000) Actress, singer, TV personality	Considering the candidacy: 30 March 2022; Recanted interest: 17 October 2023
Silviu Zetea	6 March 1961 (age 63); Seini, Maramureș County	Mayor of Medieșu Aurit, Satu Mare County (2012–2016); Local counsellor Medieșu Aurit, Satu Mare County (2000–2012); Vice-mayor Medieșu Aurit, Satu Mare County (1996–2000)	Affiliation: none	Mining Engineering Dept., Faculty of Technics, Elevated Education Institute, Baia Mare (1984); Faculty of Marketing, Vasile Goldiș Western University of Arad, Baia Mare branch (2009) Master Distiller	Considering the candidacy: 25 September 2021; Intention: 25 March 2023; Official: 17 June 2024; Failed to file his bid to BEC: 5 October 2024 (post-factum withdrawal confirmed on: 7 October 2024)

=== Declined to be candidates ===
These individuals have been the subject of speculation, but have publicly denied their interest in running for president. Here are also included individuals legally barred from running for president.

Name	Born	Public office experience	Affiliation	Alma mater and profession	Candidacy related info
Emil Boc	6 September 1966 (age 60); Răchiţele, Cluj County	Mayor of Cluj-Napoca (2004–2008, 2012–election day); Prime Minister of Romania (2008–2012); Deputy (2000–2004)	Affiliation: PNL	Faculty of Law, Babeș-Bolyai University (1995); Faculty of History and Philosophy, Babeș-Bolyai University (1991) Lawyer	Denied interest: 28 December 2023; Endorsing Nicolae Ciucă, after he became party nominee: 15 September 2024
Rareș Bogdan	17 September 1974 (age 52); Ocna Mureș, Alba County	MEP (2019–election day)	Affiliation: PNL	Faculty of Administrative and Political Sciences, Babeș-Bolyai University (1997) Journalist	Denied interest: 3 July 2022; Endorsing Nicolae Ciucă, after he became party nominee: 15 September 2024
Cătălin Cîrstoiu	18 November 1974 (age 52); Pitești, Argeș County		Affiliation: none	Faculty of Medicine, Carol Davila University of Medicine and Pharmacy (1999) Orthopedic physician	Denied interest: 9 May 2024
Florin Cîțu	1 April 1972 (age 54); Râmnicu Vâlcea, Vâlcea County	Senator (2016–election day); President of the Senate of Romania (2021–2022); Prime Minister of Romania (2020–2021); Minister of Public Finance (2019–2020)	Affiliation: PNL	Grinnell College (1996) Economist	Denied interest: 25 June 2021; Endorsing Nicolae Ciucă, after he became party nominee: 15 September 2024
Viorica Dăncilă	16 December 1963 (age 62); Roșiorii de Vede, Teleorman County	Prime Minister of Romania (2018–2019); MEP (2009–2018) Former presidential elections: 2019: 22.3% (2nd place, 1st round), 33.91% (2nd place, 2nd round)	Affiliation: PNCR	Faculty of Drilling of Wells and Exploitation of Hydrocarbon Deposits, Petroleum and Gas University, Ploiești (1988) Oil engineer, petroleum technology teacher	Denied interest: 12 September 2024; Endorsing Cristian Terheș: 12 September 2024
Vasile Dîncu	25 November 1961 (age 64); Năsăud, Bistrița-Năsăud County	Senator (2004–2007, 2020–election day); Minister of Defence (2021–2022); Minister of Regional Development and Public Administration and Deputy Prime Minister (2015–2017); MEP (2007); Minister of Public Information (2000–2003)	Affiliation: PSD	Faculty of History and Philosophy, Babeș-Bolyai University (1989) Sociologist	Denied interest: 30 April 2022; Endorsing Marcel Ciolacu, after he became party nominee: 24 August 2024
Liviu Dragnea	28 October 1962 (age 64); Gratia, Teleorman County	President of the Chamber of Deputies (2016–2019); Deputy (2012–2019); Minister of Regional Development and Administration (2012–2015); Deputy Prime Minister of Romania (2012–2014); President of Teleorman County Council (2000–2009, 2012); Minister of Administration of the Interior (2009); Prefect of Teleorman County (1996–2000)	Affiliation: none (political rights judicially suspended between 29 May 2019 – 15 July 2024); Most probable affiliation (after the political rights reinstatement): MRS	Faculty of Management and Public Administration, Ecological University of Bucharest (2003); Faculty of Transport, Politehnica University of Bucharest (1987) Transport engineer, innkeeper	Legally barred: 4 July 2022; Endorsing: Nicolae Ciucă (21 November 2024)
Sorin Grindeanu	5 December 1973 (age 52); Caransebeș, Caraș-Severin County	Minister of Transport (2021–election day); Deputy (2012–2016, 2020–election day); Deputy Prime Minister of Romania (2021–2023); Prime Minister of Romania (2017); President of the Timiș County Council (2016–2017); Minister of Communications (2014–2015); Deputy Mayor of Timișoara (2008–2012); Local Counsellor of Timișoara (2004–2008)	Affiliation: PSD	Faculty of Mathematics and Informatics, West University of Timișoara (1997) Statistician	Denied interest: 20 April 2022; Endorsing Marcel Ciolacu, after he became party nominee: 24 August 2024
Eduard Hellvig	27 October 1974 (age 52); Zalău, Sălaj County	Director of the Romanian Intelligence Service (2015–2023); MEP (2007, 2013–2015); Minister of Regional Development and Tourism (2012)	Affiliation: none Most probable endorsement: PNL	National University of Political Studies and Public Administration (2009); Faculty of Political, Administrative and Communication Sciences, Babeș-Bolyai University (1997) Political scientist, journalist	Denied interest: 8 February 2024
Laura Codruța Kövesi	15 May 1973 (age 53); Sfântu Gheorghe, Covasna County	European Chief Prosecutor (2019–election day); Chief Prosecutor of the National Anticorruption Directorate (2013–2018); Prosecutor General of Romania (2006–2012)	Affiliation: none	Faculty of Law, Babeș-Bolyai University (1995) Prosecutor	Denied interest: 13 July 2022
Daniel Morar	15 August 1966 (age 60); Luduș, Mureș County	Supreme judge on the Constitutional Court of Romania (2013–election day); Chief Prosecutor of the National Anticorruption Directorate (2005–2013)	Affiliation: none	Faculty of Law, Babeș-Bolyai University (1990) Prosecutor	Denied interest for public office: 19 December 2022
Adrian Năstase	22 June 1950 (age 76); Bucharest	Deputy (1990, 1992–2012); President of the Chamber of Deputies (1992–1996, 2004–2006); Prime Minister of Romania (2000–2004); Minister of Foreign Affairs (1990–1992) Former presidential elections: 2004: 40.9% (1st place, 1st round), 48.77% (2nd place, 2nd round)	Affiliation: none (former: PSD; political rights were suspended between 20 June 2012 – 21 December 2021)	Faculty of Sociological Studies, University of Bucharest (1978); Faculty of Law, University of Bucharest (1973) Jurist	Denied interest: 6 January 2021 Legally barred: 4 July 2022
Ioan-Aurel Pop	1 January 1955 (age 71); Sântioana, Cluj County	President of the Romanian Academy (2018–election day)	Affiliation: none	Faculty of History and Philosophy, Babeș-Bolyai University (1979) History professor	Denied interest: 4 February 2022
Cristian Popescu Piedone	15 February 1963 (age 63); Bucharest	Mayor of Sector 5 (2020–election day); Mayor of Sector 4 (2008–2015)	Affiliation: PUSL	University of Petroșani (2002) Maître d'hôtel	Denied interest: 18 August 2023
Dan Puric	12 February 1959 (age 67); Buzău, Buzău County		Affiliation: none Probable endorsement: PUSL	Caragiale National University of Theatre and Film (1985) Actor, mime artist	Denied interest: 20 February 2024
Alexandru Rafila	27 December 1961 (age 64); Bucharest	Health Minister (2021–election day); Deputy (2020–election day)	Affiliation: PSD	Faculty of General Practitioners, Carol Davila University of Medicine and Pharmacy, Bucharest (1987) Microbiologist	Denied interest: 28 June 2022; Endorsing Marcel Ciolacu, after he became party nominee: 24 August 2024
Maia Sandu	24 May 1972 (age 54); Risipeni, Fălești District, Republic of Moldova	President of Moldova (2020–election day); Prime Minister of Moldova (2019); Deputy, Moldova (2014–2015, 2019); Minister of Education, Moldova (2012–2015)	Affiliation: PAS (in Moldova); none (in Romania)	Faculty of Management, Academy of Economic Studies of Moldova (1994); Faculty of International Relations, Academy of Public Administration Economist	Denied interest: 16 February 2023

=== Timeline ===
Validated candidate
During CCR screening
During BEC screening
Official campaign before BEC filing
Intention
Considering
Withdrawn candidate
Second round
First round
BEC filing deadline
2024 European elections and 2024 Local elections
2020 Parliamentary elections
2020 Local elections

== Leading issues ==
=== Christianity in public life ===
The role of Christianity and patriotism in Romanian public life has become a leading issue in the campaign. Often both supported and mocked as "The TikTok Messiah" for his religious nationalist messaging and use of the app TikTok, Georgescu has gained appeal among religious Romanians, appealing to natalism, family values, patriotism, and traditionalism.

=== Corruption ===
Both Călin Georgescu and Elena Lasconi have criticised corruption in Romania, which has become central to their appeal. Georgescu has accused the mainstream political parties, particularly the National Coalition for Romania between the centre-left Social Democratic Party and the centre-right National Liberal Party, of fostering corruption.

=== Geopolitics ===
Lasconi favours Romania closely aligning with the United States, European Union, and NATO, while opposing Russia, while Georgescu has stated that he favours Romania's geopolitical non-alignment between the two power blocs. Georgescu has also pledged to end military aid to Ukraine. Following the first round, Lasconi said that Romania was in "a historical confrontation between preserving Romania's young democracy ... and those who want to return Romania to the Russian sphere of influence". She also accused Georgescu of being an isolationist and an "open admirer of Vladimir Putin". Georgescu denied being an extremist or a fascist and said that he is "completely dedicated to the Romanian people", adding: "We remain directly linked to European values, but we must find our (own) values."

=== LGBTQ rights ===
LGBTQ rights are expected to be a major issue in the campaign. In the second round of the campaign, LGBTQ rights organizations have made strong endorsements for Lasconi, despite her past comments, while Georgescu explicitly rejects LGBTQ rights movements. Lasconi's positions have become significantly favourable towards LGBTQ rights. Earlier in 2023, Lasconi stated that she would have voted "Yes" during the failed referendum on the constitutional prohibition of same-sex unions. Her daughter, Oana, subsequently denounced her as a "homophobe" and stated that she was "shocked and disgusted" at her mother. Lasconi immediately retracted this position, stated that she does not oppose civil unions or (in the distant future) marriage for LGBTQ couples, while stating that her party remains open for individuals who are gender or sexual minorities, and that the party is open to all, "be they ... atheists [or] LGBTQ individuals".

== Debates ==
The debates (Note: In order for a debate to be counted as such, there must be at least two candidates present. The following situations are not considered proper debates: one candidate with one or multiple interviewers; one candidate with a representative (or more) of other candidate(s); only representatives of candidates (no matter how many candidates were represented); one candidate debating a previously recorded video of other candidate(s); short live statements of a candidate (via telephone or video streaming) inserted during a show with only one (other) candidate; short coincidental encounters of candidates (in a non-previously organised debate) that spoke to each other (and were recorded, even on professional cameras in TV studios). Any debate must be publicly broadcast. Negotiations behind closed doors, "strategic meetings" among candidates or any other type of discreet talks are not proper debates, even if their content (or bits of it) was released to the public, with/without the candidates' approval of its release. Debates may be broadcast on radio, television, or the internet. Candidates may show up in person or participate in the debate via telephone or video streaming for the entire debate time. Candidates who left the debate before 10% of the debate time elapsed (after a few words or several minutes) are considered absentees and their leaving is noted as such. In this particular situation (if it will occur), the debate is considered a valid one, because at least two candidates were present at its beginning. Candidates who left before the debate's ending are considered present, with their particular situation noted as such. Re-runs or syndication are not counted as different debates.) started on 28 October 2024, three days after the start of the campaign. The last first round debate was broadcast on 21 November 2024, 8:30 hours before the electoral campaign ended. There had been 38 broadcast debates: 30 televised, six on the radio and three online. The broadcasters were:

- TVR Info (seven debates and one in syndication);
- Radio România Actualități (six debates);
- TVR 1 (five debates);
- Digi24 (four debates);
- TVR Timișoara (three debates);
- Euronews România, România TV, B1 TV and Metropola TV (each with two debates)
- A7 TV, Gândul, Antena 3, Ștefan Mandachi's video podcast, Cosmin Nedelcu's video podcast, TVR Moldova and TVR International (each with a sole debate; the last two only in syndication).
Sites of the presidential debates

=== Schedule ===
Debate schedule
Debate	Date	Time (EET)	Viewers	Broadcast type	Location	Sponsor(s)	Moderator(s)	Reference(s)
1	28 October 2024	10:00–10:55 am	TBA	live TV	Romanian Television HQ, Bucharest	TVR Info	Marinela Mititelu	
2	29 October 2024	10:00–10:55 am	TBA	live TV	Romanian Television HQ, Bucharest	TVR Info	Marinela Mititelu	
3	29 October 2024	1:20–2:00 pm	TBA	live radio	Radio Romania, Casa Radio, Bucharest	Radio România; Actualități	Ianna Ioniță	
4	29 October 2024	9:00–10:00 pm	TBA	live TV	Romanian Television HQ, Bucharest	TVR Info	Ștefan Onică, Loara Ștefănescu	
5	30 October 2024	1:20–2:00 pm	TBA	live radio	Radio Romania, Casa Radio, Bucharest	Radio România; Actualități	Ianna Ioniță	
6	30 October 2024	8:00–9:30 pm	TBA	live TV	A7 HQ, Bucharest	A7 TV	Flori Stoian	
7	31 October 2024	6:15–7:45 pm	TBA	live TV	Romanian Television HQ, Bucharest	TVR 1	Ramona Avramescu, Marian Voicu	
8	31 October 2024	9:00–9:50 pm	TBA	live TV	Politehnica University of Bucharest	Euronews; România	Vitalie Cojocari	
9	31 October 2024	9:00–10:00 pm	TBA	live TV	Romanian Television HQ, Bucharest	TVR Info	Ștefan Onică, Loara Ștefănescu	
10	1 November 2024	1:20–2:00 pm	TBA	live radio	Radio Romania, Casa Radio, Bucharest	Radio România; Actualități	Ianna Ioniță	
11	3 November 2024	8:00–8:45 pm	TBA	live TV	House of the Free Press, Bucharest	România TV	Simona Gheorghe	
12	4 October 2024	9:00–9:50 pm	TBA	live TV	Romanian Television HQ, Bucharest	TVR Info	Ștefan Onică, Loara Ștefănescu	
13	5 November 2024	1:20–2:00 pm	TBA	live radio	Radio Romania, Casa Radio, Bucharest	Radio România; Actualități	Ianna Ioniță	
14	5 October 2024	6:15–7:45 pm	TBA	live TV	Romanian Television HQ, Bucharest	TVR 1	Marian Voicu	
15	6 November 2024	10:00–10:55 am	TBA	live TV	Romanian Television HQ, Bucharest	TVR Info	Marinela Mititelu	
16	6 November 2024	3:05–3:50 pm	TBA	live TV	Digi24 HQ, Bucharest	Digi24	Anca Orheian	
17	6 October 2024	7:00–8:00 pm	TBA	live TV	TVR Timișoara HQ, Timișoara	TVR Timișoara	Ramona Boroșovici	
18	6 November 2024	9:30–11:00 pm	12.338	video streaming	Gândul HQ, Bucharest	Gândul	Denise Rifai	
19	7 October 2024	7:00–8:00 pm	TBA	live TV	TVR Timișoara HQ, Timișoara	TVR Timișoara	Ramona Boroșovici	
20	11 November 2024	4:00–4:40 pm	TBA	live TV	Politehnica University of Bucharest	Euronews; România	Claudiu Popa	
21	12 November 2024	1:20–2:00 pm	TBA	live radio	Radio Romania, Casa Radio, Bucharest	Radio România; Actualități	Ianna Ioniță	
22	12 November 2024	6:15–7:45 pm	TBA	live TV	Romanian Television HQ, Bucharest	TVR 1	Ramona Avramescu, Marian Voicu	
23	13 November 2024	9:00–10:00 pm	TBA	live TV	Digi24 HQ, Bucharest	Digi24	Cosmin Prelipceanu, Liliana Ruse	
24	13 November 2024	9:00–11:00 pm	TBA	live TV	IRIDE Business Park, Bucharest	Antena 3	Mihai Gâdea	
25	14 November 2024	9:00–10:00 pm	TBA	live TV	Digi24 HQ, Bucharest	Digi24	Cosmin Prelipceanu, Liliana Ruse	
26	15 November 2024	9:00–11:45 pm	TBA	previously recorded TV transmission	Romanian Television HQ, Bucharest	TVR 1 (broadcast syndicated to: TVR Info, TVR Moldova and TVR International)	Ramona Avramescu, Marian Voicu	
27	17 November 2024	posted at 4:00 pm (2h long)	51.606	previously recorded video podcast	unspecified location, Bucharest	Ștefan Mandachi's video podcast	Ștefan Mandachi	
28	17 November 2024	8:00–8:45 pm	approx. 439.000	live TV	House of the Free Press, Bucharest	România TV	Simona Gheorghe	
29	17 November 2024	9:00–9:50 pm	TBA	live TV	Adriatica building, Bucharest	B1 TV	Gabriela Mihai	
30	18 November 2024	1:20–2:00 pm	TBA	live radio	Radio Romania, Casa Radio, Bucharest	Radio România; Actualități	Ianna Ioniță	
31	18 November 2024	7:00–8:00 pm	TBA	live TV	TVR Timișoara HQ, Timișoara	TVR Timișoara	Ramona Boroșovici	
32	18 November 2024	8:00–11:00 pm	460.000	live TV	Digi24 HQ, Bucharest	Digi24, Babeș-Bolyai University	Cosmin Prelipceanu, Liliana Ruse	
33	19 November 2024	6:15–7:45 pm	TBA	live TV	Romanian Television HQ, Bucharest	TVR 1	Ramona Avramescu, Marian Voicu	
34	19 November 2024	9:00–9:50 pm	TBA	live TV	Adriatica building, Bucharest	B1 TV	Tudor Mușat	
35	20 November 2024	9:00–10:00 pm	TBA	live TV	Romanian Television HQ, Bucharest	TVR Info	Roxana Zamfirescu, Claudiu Lucaci	
36	20 November 2024	9:00–10:30 pm	TBA	live TV	House of the Free Press, Bucharest	Metropola TV	Radu Preda	
37	21 November 2024	2:00–5:00 pm	267.638	video streaming	unspecified location, Bucharest	Micutzu Standup Official	Cosmin Nedelcu	
38	21 November 2024	9:00–10:30 pm	TBA	live TV	House of the Free Press, Bucharest	Metropola TV	Radu Preda	

=== Participation ===
The following is a table of participating candidates in each debate:

Participating candidates
Candidate
Candidate	P Present (on spot or through a video/audio live call) N Not invited/Invitation declined A Absent (Invitation accepted, but failed to show up or downgraded their presence to a representative)																																						Total	Interaction	Candidate
Candidate	1	2	3	4	5	6	7	8	9	10	11	12	13	14	15	16	17	18	19	20	21	22	23	24	25	26	27	28	29	30	31	32	33	34	35	36	37	38	Total	Interaction	Candidate
Georgescu	P	N	N	N	P	P	P	N	N	N	N	P	N	N	P	N	P	N	N	N	P	N	P	N	N	P	N	N	N	P	P	N	P	N	P	N	N	N	14	8/13	Georgescu
Lasconi	N	N	N	N	N	N	N	N	N	N	N	N	N	N	N	N	N	N	N	N	N	N	N	N	N	A	N	N	N	A	N	P	A	N	N	N	P	N	2	5/13	Lasconi
Ciolacu	N	N	A	N	N	N	N	N	N	N	N	N	N	N	N	N	N	N	N	N	N	N	N	N	N	A	N	A	N	N	N	A	N	N	N	N	N	N	0	0/13	Ciolacu
Simion	A	N	N	N	N	N	N	N	N	A	N	N	N	A	N	N	N	N	N	N	N	N	N	N	N	A	A	N	N	N	N	P	N	N	N	N	P	N	2	5/13	Simion
Ciucă	N	A	N	N	N	N	N	N	N	N	N	N	A	N	N	N	N	N	A	N	N	N	N	N	N	A	N	A	N	N	N	A	N	N	N	N	N	N	0	0/13	Ciucă
Geoană	N	N	N	N	N	N	N	N	N	N	N	N	N	N	N	N	N	N	N	N	N	N	N	N	N	A	A	N	N	N	N	P	N	N	N	N	N	N	1	5/13	Geoană
Kelemen	N	N	P	P	N	N	N	N	N	N	N	N	N	N	N	N	A	N	N	N	A	N	N	N	N	A	N	N	N	P	N	P	N	N	N	N	N	N	4	8/13	Kelemen
Diaconescu	N	N	N	P	N	N	A	N	N	N	P	N	A	N	N	P	N	P	N	N	N	A	N	P	N	P	P	P	N	N	N	P	N	N	N	N	N	N	9	11/13	Diaconescu
Terheș	N	P	P	N	N	P	N	N	P	P	N	N	N	P	P	N	P	N	N	N	N	P	N	P	P	P	P	N	N	N	N	N	N	P	N	N	N	P	15	8/13	Terheș
Birchall	N	N	N	N	N	N	P	P	A	N	N	N	N	N	N	N	N	N	P	N	P	P	N	P	P	P	P	N	N	N	P	N	N	N	P	N	N	P	12	7/13	Birchall
Popescu	P	N	N	N	P	P	N	N	P	P	N	N	N	P	N	N	P	N	N	P	N	N	N	N	P	P	N	N	N	P	A	N	P	N	N	P	N	N	13	8/13	Popescu
Păcuraru	N	P	N	N	A	N	N	N	N	N	N	N	P	N	N	N	N	N	P	N	N	N	P	N	N	P	N	N	P	N	N	N	N	P	N	P	N	N	8	7/13	Păcuraru
Predoiu	N	N	N	N	N	N	N	N	N	N	N	P	P	N	N	N	N	N	A	P	N	N	A	N	N	P	N	N	N	N	N	N	N	N	N	P	N	N	5	7/13	Predoiu
Orban	N	N	P	P	N	N	N	P	N	N	P	N	N	N	A	P	N	P	N	N	P	N	N	N	N	P	N	P	P	N	N	P	—N/a	—N/a	—N/a	—N/a	—N/a	—N/a	11	11/13	Orban
Electoral Coverage	23.10	1.19	5.76	7.83	23.10	24.14	23.41	0.68	1.20	1.20	3.32	23.06	0.28	1.20	23.98	3.32	24.14	3.32	0.62	0.28	23.62	1.50	23.10	4.63	1.66	28.20	4.63	3.32	0.37	27.61	23.41	47.19	23.10	1.19	23.41	0.44	33.04	1.50	—N/a	—N/a	Electoral Coverage

== Endorsements ==
=== Party endorsements ===
The table below lists the political parties and other political organizations that supported any of the candidates in the first and second rounds of the presidential election.

Alliance	Party	Ideology	First round	Second round
PSD Alliance	Social Democratic Party	Social democracy	Marcel Ciolacu	Elena Lasconi
PSD Alliance	PRO Romania	Social liberalism	Marcel Ciolacu (Note: At least by the local branches in Sibiu County and Sălaj County.)	Călin Georgescu
National Liberal Party		Liberal conservatism	Nicolae Ciucă	Elena Lasconi
Alliance for the Union of Romanians		Romanian nationalism	George Simion	Călin Georgescu
Save Romania Union		Liberalism	Elena Lasconi	Elena Lasconi
S.O.S. Romania		Ultranationalism	Invalid (Note: The party called to write-in Diana Iovanovici Șoșoacă thus making the ballot invalid.)	Călin Georgescu
AFDLC	Force of the Right	Liberal conservatism	Elena Lasconi	Elena Lasconi
AFDLC	People's Movement Party	National conservatism	Elena Lasconi	Elena Lasconi
AFDLC	The Right Alternative	National conservatism	Elena Lasconi	Elena Lasconi
AFDLC	National Peasants' Party Maniu-Mihalache	Agrarianism	Elena Lasconi	Elena Lasconi
PDPP	Renewing Romania's European Project	Liberalism	Elena Lasconi	Elena Lasconi
PDPP	Democracy and Solidarity Party	Democratic socialism	Elena Lasconi	Elena Lasconi
PDPP	Volt Romania	Social liberalism	No endorsement	Elena Lasconi
Health Education Nature Sustainability Party		Progressivism	No endorsement	Elena Lasconi
PNCR Alliance	National Conservative Party	National conservatism	Cristian Terheș	No endorsement
PNCR Alliance	Republican Party	Romanian nationalism	Cristian Terheș	Călin Georgescu
PNCR Alliance	National Identity Force Party	Romanian nationalism	Cristian Terheș	No endorsement
Ecologist Party		Green conservatism	Cristian Diaconescu	No endorsement
Romania in Action Party		Localism	Mircea Geoană	No endorsement
Green Party		Green politics	No endorsement	Elena Lasconi
National Action League Party		Social liberalism	Silviu Predoiu	No endorsement
Greater Romania Party		Romanian nationalism	Mircea Geoană	Călin Georgescu
Christian Democratic National Peasants' Party		Agrarianism	No endorsement	Călin Georgescu
Nationhood Party		Ultranationalism	No endorsement	Călin Georgescu
Sovereigntist Bloc		Sovereigntism	No endorsement	Călin Georgescu
ASR	Socialist Party	Communism	No endorsement	Călin Georgescu
ASR	Social Democratic Workers' Party	Socialism	No endorsement	Călin Georgescu
ASR	Communist Party of the 21st Century	Marxism–Leninism	No endorsement	Călin Georgescu
Communists' Party		Communism	Boycott	Călin Georgescu
Party of Young People		Right-wing populism	Călin Georgescu	Călin Georgescu
National Christian Alliance		Christian nationalism	Cristian Diaconescu	Călin Georgescu
Alternative for National Dignity		Romanian nationalism	Alexandra Păcuraru	Călin Georgescu
New Romania Party		Populism	Sebastian Popescu	No endorsement
Patriots of the Romanian People		Romanian nationalism	No endorsement	Călin Georgescu
Village Party		Agrarianism	No endorsement	Călin Georgescu
Patria Party		Romanian nationalism	No endorsement	Călin Georgescu
Romanian Left National Party		Left-wing nationalism	No endorsement	Călin Georgescu
UDMR Alliance	Democratic Union of Hungarians	Hungarian minority interests	Hunor Kelemen	Elena Lasconi
UDMR Alliance	Hungarian Alliance of Transylvania	Hungarian nationalism	Hunor Kelemen	Against Georgescu
UDMR Alliance	Hungarian Civic Force	Hungarian minority interests	Hunor Kelemen	Elena Lasconi
GPMN	Party of the Roma	Romani minority interests	Marcel Ciolacu	No endorsement
GPMN	Democratic Forum of Germans	German minority interests	Against extremists	Elena Lasconi
GPMN	Union of the Ukrainians	Ukrainian minority interests	No endorsement	Euro-Atlantic option
GPMN	Federation of the Jewish Communities	Jewish minority interests	No endorsement	Elena Lasconi

=== Second round candidate endorsements ===
Candidate	First round	Endorsement
Marcel Ciolacu	19.15%	Elena Lasconi
George Simion	13.87%	Călin Georgescu
Nicolae Ciucă	8.79%	Elena Lasconi
Mircea Geoană	6.32%	Elena Lasconi
Hunor Kelemen	4.50%	Elena Lasconi
Cristian Diaconescu	3.10%	Elena Lasconi
Cristian Terheș	1.04%	No endorsement
Ana Birchall	0.46%	No endorsement
Ludovic Orban (Note: Orban withdrew in favour of Lasconi, but was still on the ballot.)	0.22%	Elena Lasconi
Sebastian Popescu	0.16%	No endorsement
Alexandra Păcuraru	0.16%	Călin Georgescu
Silviu Predoiu	0.12%	No endorsement

=== Other endorsements ===
Recently reelected Moldovan president Maia Sandu, who is also a Romanian citizen, announced her support for Elena Lasconi in the second round of the election. Georgian president Salome Zourabichvili also expressed support for Lasconi, just like French President Emmanuel Macron. Răzvan Burleanu, the president of the Romanian Football Federation, urged fans to support "European values". The Romanian Orthodox Church said it supported Romania's membership in the European Union.

== Results ==
Candidate	Party	Votes	%
Călin Georgescu	Independent	2,120,401	22.94
Elena Lasconi	Save Romania Union	1,772,500	19.18
Marcel Ciolacu	Social Democratic Party	1,769,760	19.15
George Simion	Alliance for the Union of Romanians	1,281,325	13.86
Nicolae Ciucă	National Liberal Party	811,952	8.79
Mircea Geoană	Independent	583,898	6.32
Hunor Kelemen	Democratic Alliance of Hungarians	416,353	4.50
Cristian Diaconescu	Independent	286,842	3.10
Cristian Terheș	Romanian National Conservative Party	95,782	1.04
Ana Birchall	Independent	42,853	0.46
Ludovic Orban	Force of the Right	20,089	0.22
Sebastian Popescu	New Romania Party	14,683	0.16
Alexandra Păcuraru	Alternative for National Dignity	14,502	0.16
Silviu Predoiu	National Action League Party	11,246	0.12
Total		9,242,186	100.00
Valid votes		9,242,186	97.64
Invalid/blank votes		223,071	2.36
Total votes		9,465,257	100.00
Registered voters/turnout		18,008,480	52.56
Source: Permanent Electoral Authority

Vote share
Georgescu	22.94%
Lasconi	19.18%
Ciolacu	19.15%
Simion	13.86%
Ciucă	6.79%
Geoană	6.32%
Kelemen	4.50%
Diaconescu	3.10%
Terheș	1.04%
Others	1.12%

=== By county ===
Electoral performance of candidates from the PSD, PNL and PD/PDL in the first round of Romanian presidential elections, 2000─2024

The results of the first round of voting were widely described as a shock, with both second round contenders Călin Georgescu and Elena Lasconi outperforming polling expectations. The underwhelming performance of Prime Minister Marcel Ciolacu led to the first presidential election in the history of post-communist Romania in which the Social Democratic candidate did not make it to the second round of voting. The National Liberals marked their worst ever result in a presidential race, as Nicolae Ciucă ended up in fifth place with 8.79% of the vote. Right-wing populist George Simion also registered a weak result, after it was widely speculated he would advance to the second round in December.

Turnout was higher than in 2019, with 9,465,257 Romanians showing up to the polls, representing 52.56% of the eligible electorate.

First round results by county
County	Georgescu		Lasconi		Ciolacu		Simion		Ciucă		Geoană		Kelemen	
County	Votes	%	Votes	%	Votes	%	Votes	%	Votes	%	Votes	%	Votes	%
Alba	33,534	21.88%	21,669	14.14%	24,175	15.77%	24,473	15.97%	28,191	18.39%	8,214	5.36%	4,326	2.82%
Arad	39,940	23.29%	25,016	14.58%	25,522	14.88%	29,571	17.24%	22,701	13.23%	8,896	5.18%	8,525	4.97%
Argeș	66,494	24.84%	48,253	18.03%	66,229	24.74%	38,932	14.54%	20,304	7.58%	14,977	5.59%	411	0.15%
Bacău	55,255	23.35%	39,126	16.53%	58,805	24.85%	37,376	15.79%	15,163	6.40%	15,756	6.66%	2,203	0.93%
Bihor	40,789	16.81%	30,266	12.47%	40,761	16.80%	28,309	11.66%	36,745	15.14%	10,077	4.15%	43,959	18.12%
Bistrița-Năsăud	28,413	25.44%	14,655	13.12%	25,474	22.81%	15,366	13.76%	11,412	10.21%	6,785	6.07%	3,889	3.48%
Botoșani	37,249	25.75%	14,812	10.24%	40,057	27.69%	23,391	16.17%	12,834	8.87%	9,282	6.41%	384	0.26%
Brașov	55,057	20.71%	70,209	26.41%	39,270	14.77%	31,273	11.76%	19,502	7.33%	22,750	8.55%	9,896	3.72%
Brăila	32,360	26.33%	14,347	11.67%	33,877	27.57%	18,512	15.06%	10,387	8.45%	6,756	5.49%	431	0.35%
Bucharest	132,656	14.54%	326,844	35.82%	135,374	14.83%	91,020	9.97%	60,415	6.62%	94,500	10.36%	4,180	0.46%
Buzău	40,176	22.31%	18,824	10.45%	72,892	40.49%	23,222	12.90%	9,865	5.48%	7,952	4.41%	307	0.17%
Caraș-Severin	22,300	22.10%	12,667	12.55%	27,112	26.87%	17,285	17.13%	10,368	10.27%	4,869	4.82%	842	0.83%
Călărași	28,189	26.16%	11,951	11.09%	27,969	25.96%	17,868	16.58%	12,136	11.26%	4,929	4.57%	372	0.34%
Cluj	53,461	15.36%	105,733	30.38%	36,734	10.55%	37,654	10.82%	33,239	9.55%	28,028	8.05%	31,315	9.00%
Constanța	78,723	26.50%	57,768	19.44%	49,743	16.74%	43,236	14.55%	24,944	8.39%	22,777	7.66%	824	0.27%
Covasna	5,530	7.26%	4,730	6.21%	4,876	6.40%	4,191	5.50%	1,772	2.32%	1,418	1.86%	52,078	68.39%
Dâmbovița	53,482	26.03%	27,951	13.60%	56,694	27.59%	31,075	15.12%	15,767	7.67%	10,913	5.31%	365	0.17%
Dolj	48,124	17.92%	35,472	13.20%	81,714	30.42%	42,785	15.93%	32,297	12.02%	18,288	6.81%	394	0.14%
Galați	47,675	22.11%	32,538	15.09%	57,928	26.87%	34,645	16.07%	15,784	7.32%	14,109	6.54%	626	0.29%
Giurgiu	26,461	22.97%	10,680	9.27%	23,522	20.42%	15,451	13.41%	30,573	26.54%	4,708	4.08%	184	0.15%
Gorj	32,981	23.44%	14,955	10.63%	36,836	26.18%	31,206	22.18%	12,200	8.67%	6,798	4.83%	574	0.40%
Harghita	4,114	3.49%	4,195	3.56%	4,346	3.69%	3,183	2.70%	1,600	1.35%	1,480	1.25%	97,290	82.65%
Hunedoara	37,117	22.34%	24,283	14.61%	36,706	22.09%	30,973	18.64%	13,626	8.20%	9,926	5.97%	3,330	2.00%
Ialomița	25,171	27.06%	11,701	12.58%	25,665	27.59%	16,324	17.55%	5,078	5.45%	4,806	5.16%	332	0.35%
Iași	75,455	22.01%	84,440	24.63%	63,281	18.46%	43,866	12.79%	29,466	8.59%	26,679	7.78%	855	0.24%
Ilfov	61,895	23.56%	67,229	25.59%	33,977	12.93%	32,759	12.47%	30,242	11.51%	21,977	8.36%	739	0.28%
Maramureș	37,158	22.63%	27,812	16.94%	31,144	18.97%	26,173	15.94%	15,637	9.52%	9,551	5.81%	7,437	4.53%
Mehedinți	17,454	15.43%	8,039	7.11%	40,466	35.79%	18,524	16.38%	21,062	18.62%	4,012	3.54%	264	0.23%
Mureș	31,201	14.70%	29,076	13.70%	27,355	12.89%	26,370	12.43%	14,761	6.95%	10,438	4.92%	64,928	30.60%
Neamț	45,065	24.24%	28,682	15.43%	43,790	23.55%	30,760	16.54%	15,399	8.28%	11,010	5.92%	857	0.46%
Olt	29,832	21.79%	15,676	8.57%	71,054	38.88%	27,137	14.85%	15,512	8.48%	7,819	4.27%	213	0.11%
Prahova	82,268	26.03%	57,504	18.19%	61,709	19.52%	45,880	14.51%	26,447	8.36%	21,980	6.95%	778	0.24%
Satu Mare	15,606	13.28%	12,810	10.90%	17,545	14.93%	12,749	10.85%	10,536	8.96%	4,545	3.86%	39,640	33.73%
Sălaj	15,311	16.48%	11,648	12.53%	14,575	15.68%	10,814	11.64%	12,823	13.80%	4,392	4.72%	18,573	19.99%
Sibiu	47,770	26.34%	42,755	23.58%	21,650	11.94%	21,129	11.65%	19,453	10.73%	12,780	7.04%	2,320	1.27%
Suceava	72,752	28.47%	28,815	11.27%	58,344	22.83%	44,675	17.48%	22,255	8.71%	14,019	5.48%	856	0.33%
Teleorman	25,839	18.60%	11,306	8.13%	53,430	38.46%	20,243	14.57%	17,866	12.86%	5,404	3.89%	155	0.11%
Timiș	66,016	21.37%	87,726	28.40%	42,865	13.87%	42,935	13.90%	21,007	6.80%	22,988	7.44%	5,596	1.81%
Tulcea	21,185	26.89%	10,741	13.63%	16,537	20.99%	15,545	19.73%	5,722	7.26%	4,523	5.74%	216	0.27%
Vaslui	32,352	23.06%	18,645	13.29%	42,503	30.30%	23,461	16.72%	8,857	6.31%	7,265	5.18%	464	0.33%
Vâlcea	34,484	22.76%	18,695	12.34%	39,397	26.01%	28,007	18.49%	14,816	9.78%	8,766	5.78%	401	0.26%
Vrancea	27,407	20.34%	16,098	11.94%	34,862	25.87%	26,510	19.67%	16,007	11.88%	7,104	5.27%	215	0.15%
Diaspora	345,925	43.35%	214,033	26.82%	22,893	2.87%	96,339	12.07%	36,934	4.63%	38,966	4.88%	4,738	0.59%
Total	2,120,401	22.94%	1,772,500	19.18%	1,769,760	19.15%	1,281,325	13.86%	811,952	8.79%	583,898	6.32%	416,353	4.50%

==== Maps ====
Annulled first round results by county

Annulled first round results by commune, town and municipality

== Aftermath and controversies ==
After failing to advance to the runoff, Marcel Ciolacu announced his resignation as leader of the Social Democratic Party on 25 November; however, he will remain the Prime Minister until a new government is formed following parliamentary elections on 1 December. Nicolae Ciucă also resigned as leader of the National Liberal Party after failing to advance to the runoff. Amid discussion over the role of social media in Călin Georgescu's strong showing, Ciolacu also called for funding for Georgescu's campaign on TikTok to be reviewed, while MEP and Renew Europe leader Valérie Hayer called on TikTok's CEO to answer questions about the platform's role in the election before the European Parliament, citing the Digital Services Act. The National Audiovisual Council of Romania also called for the European Commission to investigate TikTok's role in the election, while the national telecommunications regulator Ancom called for TikTok to be suspended as part of an investigation into electoral manipulation. Romanian president Klaus Iohannis also accused TikTok of failing to mark Georgescu's account as that of a political candidate. TikTok subsequently denied favouring Georgescu. Protests also broke out against Georgescu in Bucharest and several other cities in Romania. An analysis by the Romanian news outlet G4 Media found that Georgescu mounted a "propaganda machine" using thousands of supposed "volunteers" to spread his campaign messaging, adding that those involved received pre-made materials on Telegram that could readily be posted as comments on TikTok and other platforms. TikTok executives said that they had taken down several networks engaged in election interference in Romania.

On 27 November, two minor candidates, Sebastian Constantin Popescu and Cristian Terheș submitted requests to the Constitutional Court of Romania to annul the results of the first round of the election. On 28 November, the court ruled unanimously to recount all ballots cast in the first round, with a decision on whether to annul the results expected on 2 December. In their appeals, Terheș accused the USR of violating election law by campaigning among diaspora voters on polling day and alleged that votes cast for Ludovic Orban had been transferred to Elena Lasconi. Popescu accused Georgescu, who declared zero campaign spending, of failing to disclose financing linked to TikTok. The Central Election Bureau later said that scanned reports were due to be delivered by 1 December and the original ballots by 3 December. Additionally, the Supreme Council of National Defence convened and called for an investigation into alleged attacks on the electoral infrastructure and suspicions of illegal campaigning by Călin Georgescu. Georgescu denied the accusations against him, while Lasconi criticised the recount and called on the Central Election Bureau to handle the process "wisely".

In November 2024, Călin Georgescu spoke with Israeli Diaspora Affairs Minister Amichai Chikli. The Romanian Ambassador to Israel accused Israel of interfering in the 2024 Romanian presidential election in favour of Georgescu.

== Annulment ==
On 2 December, the Constitutional Court ruled unanimously to confirm the first round results and upheld the organisation of the runoff on 8 December between Georgescu and Lasconi; however, the Court reversed its decision on 6 December and annulled the election results after President Iohannis allowed the declassification of information in the Supreme Council of National Defence. The Romanian Service of Information also declared that Georgescu said he had a "Zero lei electoral campaign budget", but subsequent investigations revealed an undeclared donation of up to €1,000,000 from third parties. This prompted the Court to annul the election results.

The annulment was condemned by both Georgescu and Lasconi, with Georgescu describing the court's verdict as a "formalised coup d'état", and Lasconi calling it "illegal [and] immoral" and stating that it "crushes the very essence of democracy". Fourth-placed George Simion also called the verdict a "coup d'état in full swing" but urged against street protests. Third-placed Marcel Ciolacu called the annulment "the only correct decision".

President Iohannis also said the court's decision was legitimate and should be respected, adding that he would remain in office until a successor is inaugurated. Russian state interference in the election was widely reported, including state-sponsored cyberattacks, and the annulment was described as "an extraordinary step" by The Washington Post.

The annulment also forced a halt to advanced voting in 951 overseas polling stations for the diaspora that had opened on 6 December, after approximately 50,000 Romanians had cast ballots.

On 7 December, prosecutors searched properties across the country in an investigation into the financing of a candidate's campaign, with investigators saying money laundering was used to fund the campaign. Although the candidate's name was not revealed, Georgescu and his campaign were reportedly the target of the searches.

On the day of the cancelled runoff, Georgescu and around 100 of his supporters held a protest outside a polling station in Bucharest demanding that the election be held. An online petition calling for free elections was also launched by the AUR, which supported Georgescu. Following the annulment of the presidential election, the new government formed after the 2024 Romanian parliamentary election on 1 December was expected to set new dates for a presidential vote. Ilie Bolojan, president of the PNL, said the rerun would likely occur either before Easter in late March or early April, or after Easter in May. On 8 January 2025, the ruling coalition fixed the dates of the new election for 4 and 18 May 2025.

On 17 December, the European Commission announced an investigation into TikTok over interference in the elections. On 21 December, the political magazine Politico Europe reported that the pro-European PNL had financed a general political campaign, the hashtags of which were then used to promote Georgescu. On 12 January 2025, tens of thousands of people protested in Bucharest against the annulment of the election.

Some Romanian politicians supported Georgescu's participation in the new presidential elections in May 2025. Former Senate President Crin Antonescu, the candidate supported by the governing coalition in the new election, said: "It is not just about [Georgescu] or his statements but about a broader theme — society's trust in the fairness and reliability of the democratic system, particularly elections." Ultimately, Georgescu's attempt to register as a candidate in the new election was rejected by the Central Electoral Bureau on 7 March 2025, which led to new protests. Simion subsequently announced and registered his candidacy in Georgescu's place, which the BEC approved on 15 March.

On 21 January, the European Court of Human Rights rejected an appeal by Georgescu to reverse the annulment, saying that it did not have jurisdiction over the case. Six days later, the Venice Commission of the Council of Europe published an "Urgent Report on the cancellation of election results by Constitutional Courts", which had been commissioned by the Council of Europe President, Theodoros Rousopoulos, on 13 December 2024.

At the 2025 Munich Security Conference US Vice President JD Vance criticised the annulment, stating that "If your democracy can be destroyed with a few $100,000 of digital advertising from a foreign country, then it wasn't very strong to begin with". He said that the Romanian courts had decided to annul the elections under pressure from "flimsy suspicions of an intelligence agency and enormous pressure from its continental neighbors" (referring to the Romanian Intelligence Service).

On 24 April 2025, a judge of the Ploiești Court of Appeals overturned and suspended the Constitutional Court's ruling that had annulled the election. The Central Electoral Bureau subsequently stated that the 2025 election, due on 4 May, would continue as normal. The Prosecutor's Office attached to the Ploiești Court of Appeals appealed the decision, and the Superior Council of Magistracy referred the judge for potential disciplinary misconduct.

In the first round of the 2025 presidential election on 4 May, Simion came first with 41 percent of the vote, ahead of Bucharest mayor Nicușor Dan with 21 percent, former Senate President Crin Antonescu with 20 percent, and former Prime Minister Victor Ponta with 13 percent. Dan defeated Simion 53.6%–46.4% in the runoff on 18 May, and his presidency began on 26 May 2025.

== See also ==
- 2024 Romanian parliamentary election
- 2024 elections in the European Union
