= AUR Alliance =

AUR Alliance Alianța AUR
- Leader: George Simion
- Founded: 24 January 2023
- Ideology: National conservatism Christian nationalism Right-wing populism
- Political position: Right-wing to far-right
- Religion: Romanian Orthodox Church
- European Parliament group: European Conservatives and Reformists Group
- Colours: Gold
- Senate: 28 / 136
- Chamber of Deputies: 64 / 330
- European Parliament: 4 / 33

Website
- alianta-aur.ro

The AUR Alliance (Romanian: Alianța AUR) is a right-wing to far-right political alliance in Romania, consisting of the Alliance for the Union of Romanians (AUR) and other smaller parties. The alliance was founded in January 2023, and aimed to participate in the 2024 Romanian elections and 2025 Romanian presidential elections.

== History ==
The AUR Alliance was officially founded on 24 January 2023, the Day of the Unification of the Romanian Principalities. Initially, the alliance consisted of the Alliance for the Union of Romanians (AUR) led by George Simion, the Republican Party of Romania (PRR) led by Marian Cucșa, and the National Peasant Alliance (ANȚ) led by Radu Ghidău. Party leaders said their common goal was to "return Romania to where it deserves to be" and win the 2024 elections.

On 14 November 2023, at an AUR press conference, Lidia Vadim Tudor (the daughter of the Corneliu Vadim Tudor), former Minister Ilan Laufer (FIN party leader), businessman Muhammad Murad, entrepreneurs Sorin Constantinescu and Sorin Ilieșiu, as well as deputies Florică Calotă, Daniel Forea, Dumitru Viorel Focșa and senators Ovidiu Iosif Florean, Călin Gheorghe Matieș and Vasilică Potecă announced that they are joining AUR Alliance for the 2024 elections.

On 21 November 2023, George Simion announced that the Romanian Village Party and the National Rebirth Alliance would join the AUR Alliance. On 14 December 2023, Romanian National Conservative Party (PNCR), led by MEP Cristian Terheș since 12 December 2023, and the National Unity Bloc (BUN) party led by Dorel Vulpoiu, joined the AUR Alliance.

On 1 March 2024, Ilan Laufer announced that his FIN party was leaving the AUR Alliance. Laufer claimed that the George Simion's AUR Alliance and was created "to illegally transfer members of its member parties to the AUR Party, which is an attempt to eliminate sovereigntist parties from the Alliance with the clear aim of confiscating and destroying the nationalist and sovereigntist movement in Romania". On 2 March 2024, the National Peasant Alliance also announced its withdrawal from the AUR Alliance. The ANȚ leader explained the reason for leaving the alliance as "totalitarian tendencies and dictatorial leadership style" of George Simion. The Romanian Village Party also left the AUR alliance before the 2024 local and European elections.

In April 2024, PNCR leader MEP Cristian Terheș became the leader of the AUR Alliance list for the 2024 European Parliament election in Romania.

== Member parties ==
Party	Abbr.	Ideology	Leader	Member
Alliance for the Union of Romanians	AUR	Right-wing populism Revolutionary nationalism	George Simion	Jan 2023–
National Unity Bloc	BUN	Romanian nationalism	Dorel Vulpoiu	Dec 2023–

=== Former members ===
Party	Abbreviation	Ideology	Leader	Member between
Republican Party of Romania	PRR	Romanian nationalism	Marian Cucșa	Jan 2023–Oct 2024
National Peasant Alliance	ANȚ	Romanian nationalism National conservatism	Radu Ghidău	Jan 2023–Mar 2024
National Identity Force	FIN	Romanian nationalism	Ilan Laufer	Nov 2023–Mar 2024
Romanian Village Party	RoSAT	Agrarianism; Christian democracy	Marian Vișu-Iliescu	Nov 2023–~Apr 2024
Romanian National Conservative Party	PNCR	National conservatism	Cristian Terheș	Dec 2023–Aug 2024
National Rebirth Alliance	ARN	Christian right Economic liberalism	Peter Costea	Nov 2023–Aug 2024

== Electoral history ==
=== European elections ===
Election	Votes	%	MEPs	Position	EU Party	EP Group
2024	1,334,905	14.93	6 / 33 (Note: AUR Alliance members: AUR (5 MEPs), PNCR (1 MEP) and the other party members did not achieved any mandates (ARN, PRR and BUN).)	2nd	ECR/ECPM	ECR
