= Romanian nationalism =

Political movement

Flag of Romania

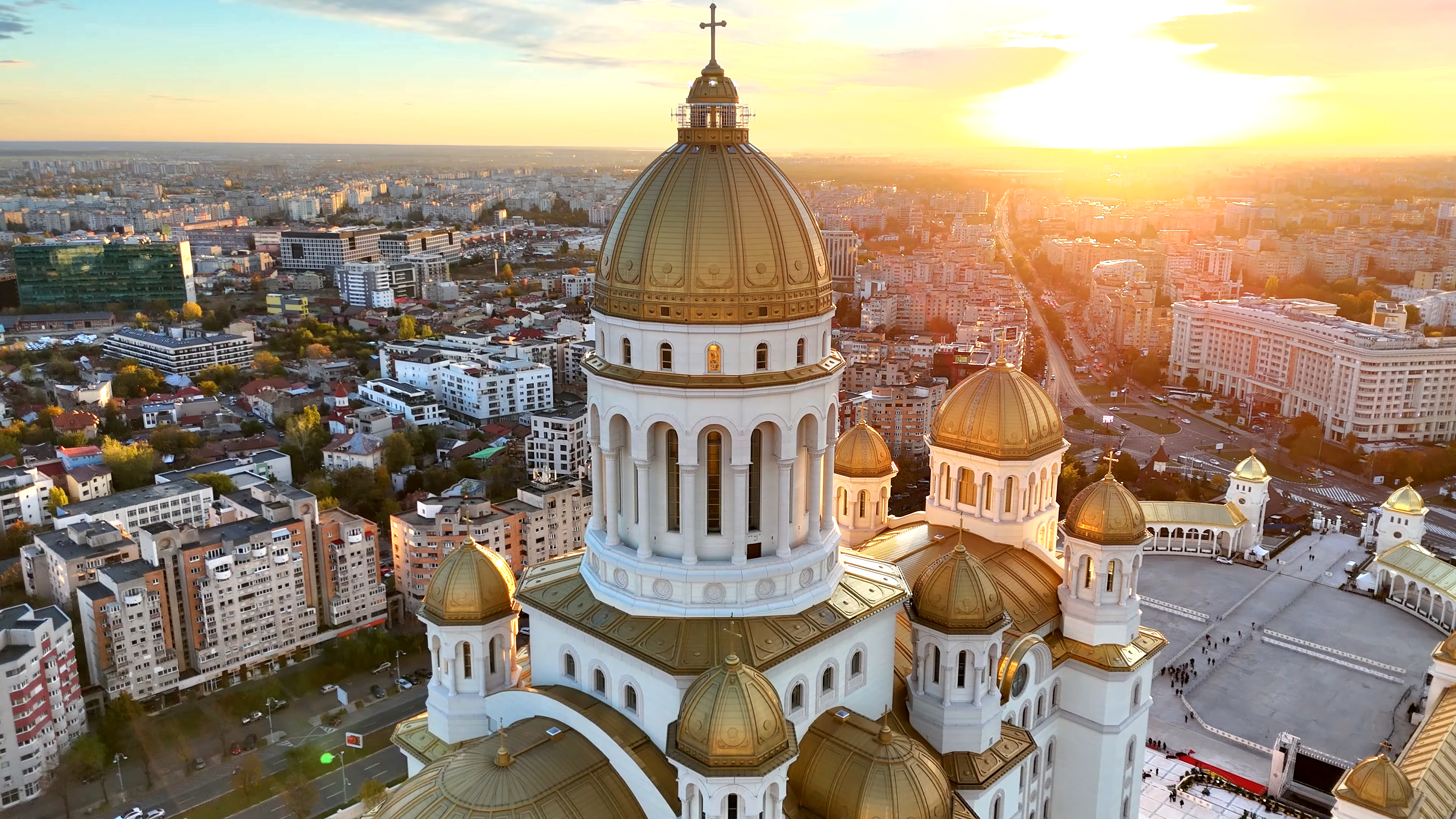
National Cathedral of Romania

Romanian nationalism is a form of nationalism that asserts that Romanians are a nation and promotes the identity and cultural unity of Romanians. Its extremist variation is Romanian ultranationalism.

== History ==
=== Antecedents ===
The predecessors of the modern Romanian state were the principalities of Wallachia and Moldavia, which for most of their existence were vassals of the Ottoman Empire. One of the earliest proponents of Romanian nationalism was the Moldavian prince Iacob Heraclid (ruled 1561-1563), who declared that the Romanians had Roman ancestry and made failed attempts to unite Moldavia, Wallachia, and Transylvania- the three principal regions inhabited by Romanians. Later the Wallachian prince Michael the Brave was able to, for a short time in 1600, unite the three regions, marking the first time this had ever been done under a single ruler. For this he is still today regarded as a symbol of Romanian unity.

In Transylvania, then under Habsburg rule, the cultural movement called the Transylvanian School was founded at a time when Romanians in the region faced social and political disenfranchisement. In the 1791 document Supplex Libellus Valachorum Transsilvaniae ("Petition of the Vlachs [Romanians] of Transylvania"), the School demanded equal rights for the Romanian population and asserted a Romanian national continuity stretching back to Roman Dacia. The document was ignored.

The spread of Romantic nationalism throughout Europe in the 19th century affected the Romanians as well. The Wallachian uprising of 1821, led by Tudor Vladimirescu, has been described by scholars as espousing an early version of Romanian nationalism. American historian Grant T. Harward credits Vladimirescu's 1821 uprising with being "the first major sign of Romanian nationalism".

The closely related 1848 revolts in Wallachia and Moldavia (part of the broader European revolutions of 1848) also had nationalist overtones. Transylvanian Romanians during the Hungarian Revolution of 1848, led by Avram Iancu, fought the Hungarian revolutionaries and themselves demanded autonomy.

=== Emergence of a Romanian nation-state ===
These nationalist currents ultimately culminated with the establishment of the personal union of Moldavia and Wallachia under Alexandru Ioan Cuza in 1859, which became a full political union in 1862 and established the modern Romanian state. It remained under Ottoman suzerainty, though this status was by then merely nominal. On 21 May 1877, Romania declared independence from the Ottomans in the midst of the Russo-Turkish War (1877–1878), with these events and the associated fighting known in Romanian historiography as the "Romanian War of Independence". Following the victory of the Russian Empire and Romania, the ruling prince Carol I assumed the title of King, reflecting the fully independent status of the country.

The Kingdom of Romania first expanded its territory with the acquisition of southern Dobruja from Bulgaria in 1913 during the Second Balkan War, which nonetheless only had a minority of Romanians.

=== Fulfillment of Greater Romania ===
Map of Greater Romania, the most notorious Romanian nationalist and irredentist ideal, as it stood from 1918 to 1940

The greatest and most important territorial expansion was initiated at the end of the First World War in 1918; the collapse of the Austro-Hungarian Empire allowed Transylvania to unite with Romania; and the collapse of the Russian Republic and the subsequent Russian Civil War allowed the Romanians of Bessarabia to set up the Moldavian Democratic Republic, which then proceeded to unite with Romania. "Greater Romania" was fulfilled, and the ambitions of the nationalists and irredentists were satisfied.

However, there were now sizable non-Romanian minorities (especially Hungarians in Transylvania and Slavic groups in Bessarabia). The new multiethnic and multicultural reality fundamentally conflicted with nationalists' desire for a homogenous Romanian state, and there was difficulty in imposing a "modern national consciousness" because of the hundreds of years of political separation of the Romanian regions. In the eyes of the nationalist anthropologists, historians, and scientists, the survival of Romania became fundamentally bound to the need for maintaining a national-ethnic unity within one state; discourse on the subject "soon became invested with racial and biopolitical tropes."

=== Fascist period and World War II ===
By the time of the Romanian fascist period (1937-1944), nationalist attitudes had developed to an extreme form and were imbued with antisemitism as well. The most intense fascist movement was that of the Iron Guard, which briefly governed from 1940 to 1941 was governed under the ideology of Legionarism. The Iron Guard espoused a strong religious nationalism, with its leader Corneliu Zelea Codreanu writing that the group was a "spiritual school...[which] strikes to transform and revolutionise the Romanian soul."

During this time, Romanian territorial successes were somewhat reversed with the 1940 Soviet occupation and annexation of Bessarabia and Northern Bucovina and the forced cession of Northern Transylvania to Hungary that same year. Romania under Ion Antonescu joined the Second World War on the side of the Axis Powers and participated in Operation Barbarossa in 1941, receiving back Bessarabia plus Odessa and surrounding territory (the Transnistria Governorate) in compensation for the loss of Northern Transylvania. During the war, Antonescu pursued a policy of colonization in the Transnistria Governorate, marking a shift from a nationalist policy that valued separation from foreign nationalities to one that promoted expansionism and dominance over those perceived as lesser peoples (Slavs and Jews). This was seen as beneficial to the Romanian people because it involved the suppression of peoples perceived as a fundamental threat to Romania through the reduction of their "living space".

The Axis Powers ultimately lost the war and the borders of Romania shifted once more. The Soviet Union retook Bessarabia and Romania regained northern Transylvania. To this day these are still the borders of Romania.

=== Communist period ===
A communist regime was installed in Romania following the end of the Second World War, and during the early years of this regime Romanian nationalism was suppressed in favor of Sovietization. After 1955 and especially during the 1960s, a process of de-satellization occurred, ending the period of unchallenged Soviet domination and marking the end of any Sovietization in the country.

During the rule of Nicolae Ceaușescu (1965-1989), a form of Romanian nationalism (known as national communism) began to be promoted, involving the formation of a cult of personality around Ceaușescu and the idealization of Romanian history (protochronism). Ceaușescu went as far as to semi-rehabilitate Ion Antonescu (deeming him a "misunderstood patriot") and denouncing the Molotov–Ribbentrop Pact which had allowed the Soviets to take Bessarabia in 1940.

The communist era in Romania ended with the overthrow of Ceaușescu in 1989.

=== Present day developments ===
Today the main expression of Romanian nationalism is the promotion of the reunification of Moldova and Romania. Moldova (formed from most of Soviet Bessarabia) gained independence from the Soviet Union in 1991 but failed to reunify with Romania. The movement faced hostility from previous pro-Russian governments of independent Moldova. Nonetheless, the pro-European government of Maia Sandu has developed a closer relationship with Romania fostered by the links in culture and heritage between the two countries. Sandu herself stated once that if a referendum on the unification of Moldova and Romania was held, she would vote yes.

Independent nationalist presidential candidate Călin Georgescu achieved first place in the first round of the 2024 Romanian presidential election, though the election result was later annulled due to alleged Russian interference.

== Parties ==
=== Current ===
- Christian Democratic National Peasants' Party (1989–present)
- Romanian Ecologist Party (1990–present)
- Greater Romania Party (1991–present)
- Noua Dreaptă (2000–present)
- Social Democratic Party (2001–present)
- Romanian Socialist Party (2003–present)
- People's Movement Party (2014–present)
- National Identity Bloc in Europe (2017–present)
- Alliance for the Union of Romanians (2019–present)
- Romanian Nationhood Party (2019–present)
- The Right Alternative (2019–present)
- National Peasant Alliance (2019–present)
- Force of the Right (2021–present)
- Romanian Village Party (2021–present)
- S.O.S. Romania (2021–present)
- Nation People Together (2022–present)
- Romania in Action Party (2023–present)
- Party of Young People (2023–present)
- Romanian National Conservative Party (2023–present)

=== Former ===
- Romanian National Party (1881–1926)
- Democratic Nationalist Party (1910–1946)
- Bessarabian Peasants' Party (1918–1923)
- Democratic Union Party (1919–1923)
- National Italo-Romanian Cultural and Economic Movement (1921–1923)
- National Romanian Fascio (1921–1923)
- National Liberal Party (1875–1947)
- Romanian Communist Party (1921–1989)
- National Fascist Movement (1923–1930s)
- National-Christian Defense League (1923–1935)
- Iron Guard (1927–1941)
- National Liberal Party–Brătianu (1930–1938)
- National Socialist Party (1932–1934)
- Crusade of Romanianism (1934–1937)
- Romanian Front (1935–1938)
- Romanian National Unity Party (1990–2006)
- Socialist Party of Labour (1990–2003)
- Democratic National Salvation Front (1992–1993)
- Everything For the Country Party (1993–2015)
- New Generation Party (2000–2022)
- People's Party – Dan Diaconescu (2011–2015)
- United Romania Party (2015–2022)
- Alliance for the Homeland (2021–2023)

== See also ==
- Dacianism
- Greater Romania
- Great Union
- National communism in Romania
- National symbols of Romania
- Territorial evolution of Romania
- Unification of Moldova and Romania
- Romanian Orthodox Church
