= Diana Șoșoacă =

Romanian lawyer and politician

Diana Șoșoacă MEP
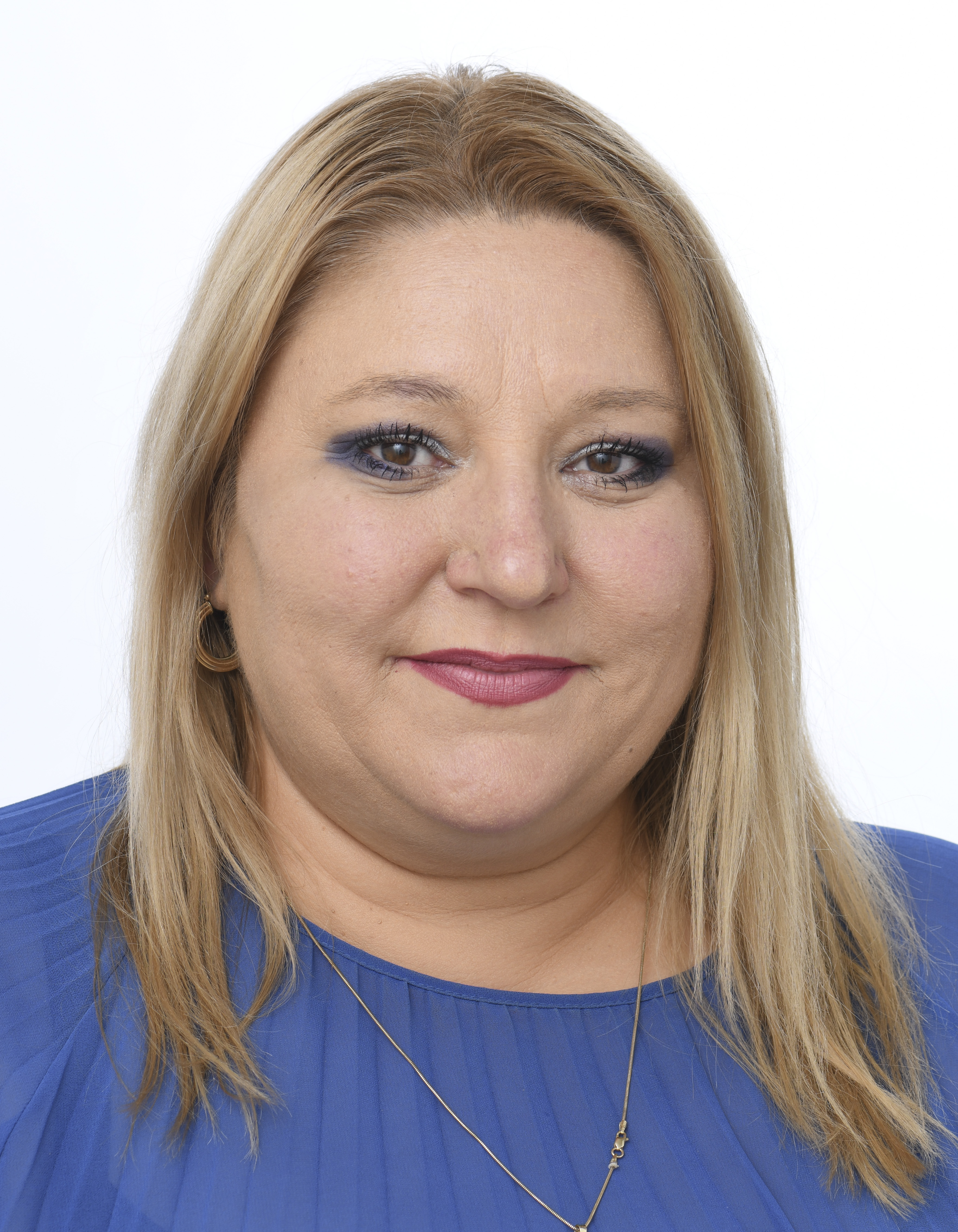
- Official portrait, 2024

Member of the European Parliament
- Incumbent
- Assumed office 16 July 2024
- Constituency: Romania

Senator of Romania
- In office 21 December 2020 – 15 July 2024
- Parliamentary group: AUR (2020–2021); Independent (2021–2024)
- Constituency: Iași County

Personal details
- Born: Diana Iovanovici; 13 November 1975 (age 50) Bucharest, Socialist Republic of Romania
- Party: S.O.S. Romania (2022–present)
- Other political affiliations: Romanian Nationhood Party (2020–2022) (Note: Iovanovici Șoșoacă was elected in the Romanian Senate from the PNR on the lists of the AUR based on a protocol between the two parties, signed on 20 October 2020.)
- Children: 2
- Occupation: Lawyer; politician
- Awards: Order of the State of Palestine

Diana Iovanovici Șoșoacă (Romanian pronunciation: [diˈana joˈvanovitʃʲ ʃoˈʃo̯akə]; née Iovanovici; born 13 November 1975) is a Romanian lawyer, activist, and far-right politician. Șoșoacă rose to prominence as an anti-vaccine activist during the COVID-19 pandemic in Romania. She has served as a Member of the European Parliament (MEP) for S.O.S. Romania since her election in 2024.

Șoșoacă was elected to the Senate of Romania in the 2020 election as a member of the Alliance for the Union of Romanians (AUR). She was later excluded from the party's parliamentary caucus, and joined S.O.S. Romania in 2023. She served in the Senate until her election to the European Parliament in 2024. Șoșoacă was barred from running for President of Romania in the 2024 election by the Constitutional Court.

== Early life and education ==
Diana Iovanovici was born on 13 November 1975 in Bucharest. Her paternal grandparents had migrated from Skopje, modern North Macedonia, with Șoșoacă stating that "half of [her] is from Skopje". According to Șoșoacă, an aunt of hers was imprisoned for opposing the Romanian communist regime. Șoșoacă's mother is Alice Florescu Bleotu, a gynecologist and specialist in esotericism. Diana Iovanovici was married to Dumitru Silvestru Șoșoacă, who was her third husband.

Some sources stated she obtained a law degree from the Romanian-American University in Bucharest, and then worked for Eugen Dijmărescu, Minister of Commerce in the Năstase cabinet. Șoșoacă said she studied law at the University of Bucharest, at the urging of an uncle who was president of the Prahova County Tribunal.

== Political career ==
Șoșoacă gained notoriety in Romania in 2020 during the COVID-19 pandemic, by protesting restriction measures on social media. She went on to become one of the main anti-vaccine figures in Romania.

=== Senate of Romania (2020–2024) ===
On 21 December 2020, she was elected to the Senate of Romania for the Iași County as a member of Alliance for the Union of Romanians (AUR). She later said that she did not want to enter the Parliament of Romania, but that she was forced by other people who pressured her.

On 10 February 2021, she was excluded from AUR's parliamentary group after AUR members Claudiu Târziu and Sorin Lavric proposed her exclusion for not following the party's strategy. Subsequently, on 30 May 2022, she joined S.O.S. Romania, a party founded in November 2021.

Șoșoacă also supports a Romanian withdrawal from the European Union. She holds anti-immigration views. She was fined for hate speech against Syrian-born Romanian physician and politician Raed Arafat.

==== Views on Russia ====
Șoșoacă has also been recurrently criticized in Romanian media for her ties with Russia. The Russian state-controlled Sputnik news agency named her "the politician of the year 2021 in Romania". In March 2022, in the midst of the Russian invasion of Ukraine, Șoșoacă together with 3 other MPs met with the Russian ambassador in Bucharest to discuss a "memorandum related to the Peace of Bucharest" and Romania's neutrality in the context of the invasion. This meeting had not been approved for representation by the Parliament leadership and one of the MPs, PSD member Dumitru Coarnă, was expelled from his party shortly afterwards.

Șoșoacă was appreciated by Killnet (a pro-Russia hacking group which launched in 2022 a series of cyberattacks on multiple Romanian websites), after she said that Romania must not get involved in the war in Ukraine. In March 2023, she proposed a law project on the Romanian Parliament for the annexation by Romania of Northern Bukovina, the Hertsa region, Budjak, Northern Maramureș and Snake Island from Ukraine, as they were "historical territories" that belong to Romania as stated in the law project. In retaliation, Ukraine announced it would impose sanctions against Șoșoacă, labeling her as a threat to Ukrainian national security.

On 21 November 2023, Diana Șoșoacă interrupted a secret session of the Parliament of Romania, during which footage of the Gaza war was presented, yelling "Palestine". She took a pro-Palestine stance during the conflict, stating that Romania should be neutral and mediate the conflict, that Hamas does not represent all Palestinians and that Israel is committing war crimes. During a Romania-Israel friendship day event in the Romanian Parliament, she is alleged to have shouted "Long live the Guard" in protest, in reference to the Iron Guard.

=== Member of the European Parliament (2024–present) ===
In June 2024, Șoșoacă was elected as a member of the European Parliament. She suggested that the Parliament should be "blessed" and "purified" by a priest. On the first day of the Strasbourg Plenary, Șoșoacă wore a muzzle over her face as a sign of dissent during Ursula von der Leyen's opening speech. Later, she loudly protested when French MEP Valérie Hayer suggested that abortion rights be included in the EU Charter of Fundamental Rights. After interrupting Hayer's speech several times, she was escorted outside the chamber.

=== 2024 and 2025 Romanian presidential election ===
Șoșoacă intended to run for President of Romania in the 2024 election. However, she was barred from running by the Constitutional Court, which removed her name from the list of candidates on the November 2024 ballot. In response, she said "[t]his proves the Americans, Jews and the European Union have plotted to rig the Romanian election before it has begun". The court's decision was called "an unprecedented threat to democratic values" by politicians on all sides. The court's ruling, which was split 5–2 along party lines, was criticized by some for being politically motivated, including by the governing National Liberal Party. The Constitutional Court noted that she had a long-term antisemitic discourse: "the promotion of a constant antidemocratic and anti-Semitic speech".

On 13 March 2025, Șoșoacă registered her candidacy for the 2025 Romanian presidential election, which was rejected by the Central Electoral Bureau.

On 2 August 2025, Șoșoacă received the Honorary Order of the State of Palestine.

== Controversies ==
=== 2021 reporter controversy ===
On 12 December 2021, Șoșoacă was interviewed by Italian reporter Lucia Goracci who was investigating the anti-vaccine movement for Rai 1. After a very tense exchange, Șoșoacă locked the door of her apartment and called the police, stating that someone had entered her office.

Once police had arrived, Șoșoacă asked that all of Goracci's footage be deleted. Goracci said that she and her crew had been held captive by the senator and that she had been punched by Șoșoacă's husband without the police intervening. The stalemate ended after eight hours, following an intervention by the Italian embassy.

=== False claims about the 2023 Turkey–Syria earthquakes ===
In February 2023, she falsely accused the United States of causing the Turkey–Syria earthquakes with a seismic weapon. Șoșoacă used Facebook to spread fake news on the matter, using footage from 2009 falsely claiming to be from 2023.

=== Iron Guard commemoration (2024) ===
Police officers from Ilfov County announced that they are investigating and opening a criminal case according to emergency ordinance no. 31/2002 after several people, including Șoșoacă, commemorated Iron Guard leader Corneliu Zelea Codreanu at a wayside cross in Tâncăbești. Some of the participants raised their hands in the Hitler salute.

=== St. Petersburg International Economic Forum (2026) ===
In 2026, she attended a Russian-backed forum in Saint Petersburg, where she addressed Vladimir Putin, criticized Romania’s political leadership, and posed for photographs with several prominent Russian and pro-Russian figures, including individuals subject to European sanctions and conviction.
