= National Rebirth Alliance =

Political party in Romania

National Rebirth Alliance Alianța Renașterea Națională
- Abbreviation: ARN
- President: Gheorghe Noane
- Founder: Peter Costea
- Founded: 23 December 2019
- Dissolved: 23 August 2024
- Merged into: Romanian National Conservative Party
- Headquarters: Piața Plevnei, nr. 4 Timișoara
- Ideology: Christian democracy; Economic liberalism; Social conservatism; Pro-life/Anti-abortion; Anti-immigration; Euroscepticism
- Political position: Right-wing to far-right
- Religion: Evangelical
- National affiliation: AUR Alliance
- Colors: Blue
- Senate: 0 / 136
- Chamber of Deputies: 0 / 330
- European Parliament: 0 / 33
- Mayors: 0 / 3,176
- County Councilors: 0 / 1,340
- Local Council Councilors: 0 / 39,900

Website
- aliantarenastereanationala.ro

The National Rebirth Alliance (Romanian: Alianța Renașterea Națională, ARN) was a right-wing, Christian conservative political party in Romania. The party's main values were faith, family, and education.

== History ==
The party was formed in 2019 by lawyer and Coaliția pentru Familie figure, Peter Costea, and his supporters after he failed to enter the European Parliament as an independent in the elections held earlier that year. The relatively new and small party grew in popularity by taking a very anti-abortion attitude, hoping to unite all anti-abortion movements in the country under its leadership. It has merged into the Romanian National Conservative Party, along with The Right Alternative.

== Ideology ==
The party is defined by its predominant right-wing Christian values, most notable being its anti-abortion and traditional family policies. According to Peter Costea, the right to life is the most fundamental human right and seeks to review the Romanian abortion law, saying: "If we discuss the laws for the euthanasia of animals, why not discuss the granting of personality to the unborn?". The current law is deemed by him as being illegitimate as it was issued in 1989 by the National Salvation Front Council in the midst of the anti-communist revolution. The party also opposes same-sex marriage, as well as gender ideology, or any form of sex education for children in schools. Peter Costea aims to open for the first time a real debate on what he calls "non-negotiable principles" in Romania.

== Electoral history ==
=== Legislative elections ===
The results were the following:

Election	Chamber			Senate			Position	Aftermath
Election	Votes	%	Seats	Votes	%	Seats	Position	Aftermath
2020	21,577	0.38	0 / 330	23,714	0.42	0 / 136	11th	Extra-parliamentary opposition to PNL-USR PLUS-UDMR government (2020–2021)
2020	21,577	0.38	0 / 330	23,714	0.42	0 / 136	11th	Extra-parliamentary opposition to PNL-UDMR minority government (2021)
2020	21,577	0.38	0 / 330	23,714	0.42	0 / 136	11th	Extra-parliamentary opposition to CNR government (2021–present)

=== European Parliament elections ===
Election	Votes	%	MEPs	Position	EU Party
2024	1,334,905	14.93	0 / 33	2nd (within AUR Alliance)^{1}	-

Note:
^{1} AUR Alliance members: AUR (5 MEPs), PNRC (1 MEP) and the other party members did not achieved any mandates (ARN, PRR and BUN).
