= Accusations of Russian interference in the 2024 Romanian presidential election =

2024 European political affair

The 2024 Romanian presidential election was marred by allegations of Russian interference, raising concerns over election integrity and the potential geopolitical consequences for NATO and the European Union (EU). Multiple reports from Romanian and international authorities detailed foreign influence efforts, particularly aimed at supporting far-right and pro-Russian candidate Călin Georgescu through the illicit foreign funding of a TikTok campaign.

== Background ==
Romania's elections took place in a politically charged environment, with public dissatisfaction over corruption and economic issues fueling the rise of nationalist candidates. The elections coincided with increasing Russian efforts to influence political landscapes across Eastern Europe, including recent interference operations in Moldova and Georgia. Romania, a key NATO and EU member, became a strategic target due to its critical location near the Black Sea and its support for Ukraine during the ongoing conflict with Russia.

== Allegations of interference ==
=== Cyber and financial influence ===
The Romanian Supreme Council for National Defense (CSAT) released declassified reports alleging cyberattacks by foreign "state actors" in order to influence the election. These included hacking attempts on Romanian institutions, the spread of disinformation, and the amplification of nationalist rhetoric on social media platforms. The reports also indicated a possibly foreign funding of Călin Georgescu's campaign, supporting digital outreach and disinformation campaigns. No evidence established direct connections between Georgescu's campaign and Russian state actors. There were only assertions that there must have been due to his rapid rise on social media.

=== Role of social media ===
TikTok played a pivotal role in Georgescu's campaign, raising concerns about the platform's vulnerability to manipulation. Romanian authorities accused TikTok of allowing the proliferation of fake accounts and foreign-sponsored content promoting Georgescu. The European Commission launched an investigation under the Digital Services Act to assess TikTok's role in enabling election manipulation. Romanian regulators even considered suspending the platform during the election, citing its alleged failure to address disinformation and its impact on public trust. According to Politico, a subsequent investigation by the National Agency for Fiscal Administration determined that the "National Liberal Party paid for a campaign on TikTok that ended up favoring ... Georgescu" and not Russia as previously presented to the Constitutional Court. The National Liberal Party's efforts were part of an ill-fated attempt to draw votes from the Social Democratic Party.

== International reactions ==
The US Department of State and the EU expressed strong concerns about the allegations. The US emphasized Romania's importance as a NATO ally and its role in upholding democratic values in the region. State Department officials urged full investigations into the CSAT report's findings, underscoring the risks posed by Russian influence. Romanian President Klaus Iohannis convened national security meetings to address these threats, labeling the actions of "state and non-state actors" as significant risks to the country's democratic processes. In December 2024, the European Commission announced an investigation into TikTok over the allegations. On 28 April 2025, right-wing conservative Hungarian think-tank Mathias Corvinus Collegium filed a complaint with the European Ombudsman because the European Commission denied access to the documents containing information on the EU's DSA proceedings in the case.

== Annulment ==
On 2 December, the Constitutional Court of Romania ruled unanimously to confirm the first round results and upheld the organisation of the runoff on 8 December between Georgescu and Lasconi; however, the court reversed its decision on 6 December and annulled the election results after President Iohannis allowed the declassification of information in the Supreme Council of National Defence. The Romanian Service of Information also declared that Georgescu said he had a "zero lei electoral campaign budget", but subsequent investigations revealed an undeclared donation of up to €1 million from third parties. This prompted the court to annul the election results.

The annulment was condemned by both Georgescu and Lasconi, with Georgescu describing the court's verdict as a "formalised coup d'etat", and Lasconi calling it "illegal [and] immoral" and stating that it "crushes the very essence of democracy". Fourth-placed George Simion also called the verdict a "coup d'état in full swing" but urged against street protests. Third-placed Marcel Ciolacu called the annulment "the only correct decision". Incumbent President Iohannis also said the court's decision was legitimate and should be respected. Russian state interference in the election was widely reported, including state-sponsored cyberattacks, and the annulment was described as "an extraordinary step" by The Washington Post. The annulment also forced a halt to advanced voting in 951 overseas polling stations for the diaspora that had opened on 6 December, after approximately 50,000 Romanians had cast ballots.

== Investigative reporting ==
Independent Romanian investigative journalism website snoop.ro reported on 20 December 2024, that according to confidential sources from Romania's National Agency for Fiscal Administration (ANAF), it was Romania's own National Liberal Party that financed at least one social media campaign on TikTok. This reporting was re-published by other media outlets; however, it has not been independently confirmed nor reported by official government sources.

== See also ==
- Russian interference in European politics
- Russian interference in the 2016 Brexit referendum
- Russian interference in United States elections:
  - Russian interference in the 2016 United States elections
    - Senate Intelligence Committee report on Russian interference in the 2016 United States presidential election
  - Russian interference in the 2018 United States elections
  - Russian interference in the 2020 United States elections
  - Russian interference in the 2024 United States elections
