= Cristian Terheș =

Romanian politician (born 1978)

Cristian-Vasile Terheș MEP
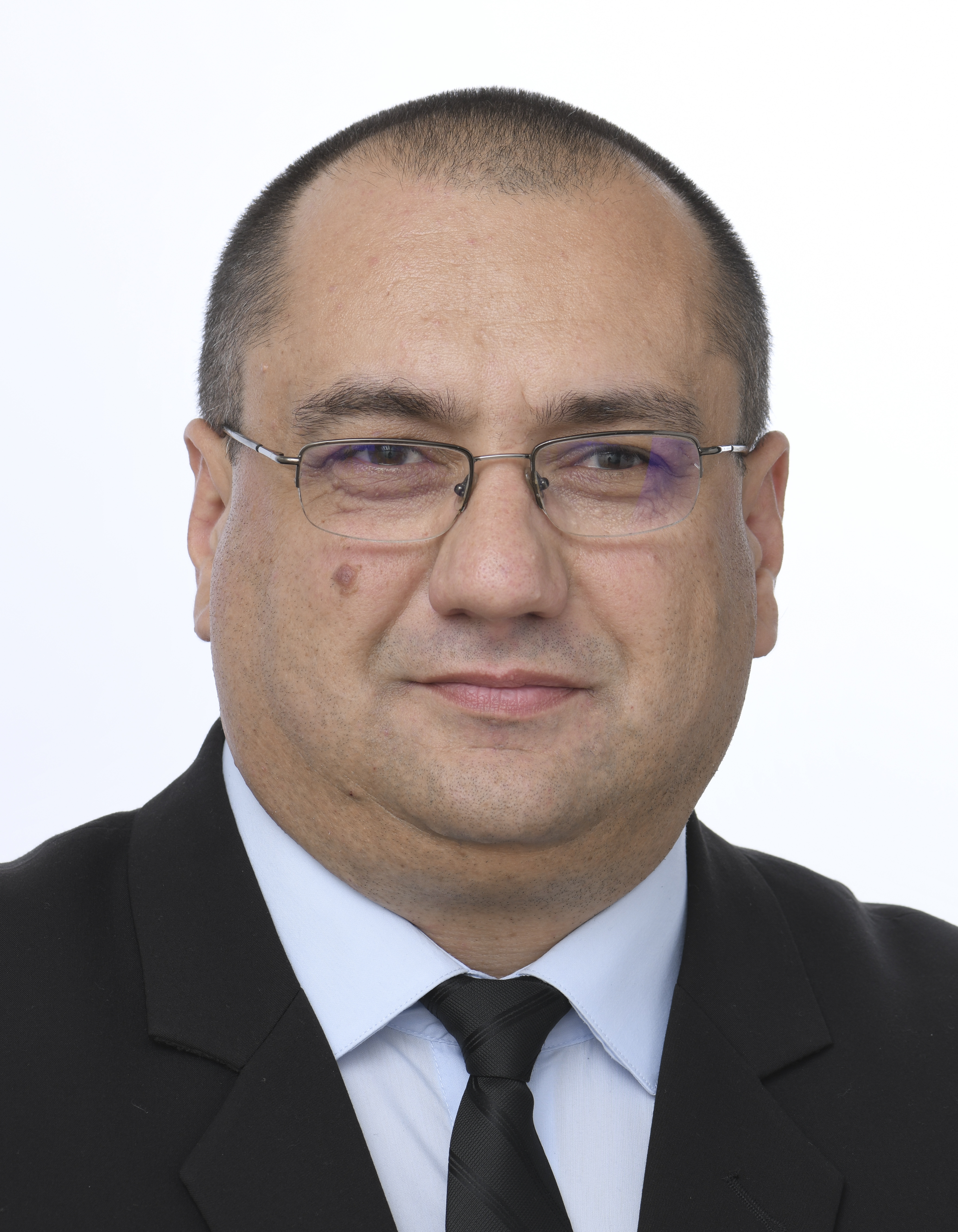
- Official portrait, 2024

Leader of the Romanian National Conservative Party
- Incumbent
- Assumed office 10 December 2023
- Preceded by: Petre Cristian Bărnuțiu

Member of the European Parliament for Romania
- Incumbent
- Assumed office 1 July 2019

Personal details
- Born: 4 December 1978 (age 47) Zalău, Sălaj County, Romania
- Party: PNCR (since 2023), part of AUR Alliance
- Other political affiliations: PSD (until 2020); PNȚCD (2020–2023); AUR Alliance (2023–2024)
- Education: Babeș-Bolyai University; Fullerton College
- Occupation: Politician
- Profession: Priest, journalist

Cristian-Vasile Terheș (born 4 December 1978) is a Romanian politician and journalist, serving as leader of the Romanian National Conservative Party since 2023, and a Member of the European Parliament (MEP) for Romania since 2019.

Terhes was initially a member of the Social Democratic Party (PSD), before joining the Christian Democratic National Peasants' Party (PNȚ-CD) in May 2020, as well as becoming a member of the European Christian Political Movement (ECPM).

== Biography ==
Born in Zalău, he studied theology at Babeș-Bolyai University in Cluj-Napoca, and was consecrated priest of the Romanian Greek Catholic Church in Oradea. He then studied journalism at Fullerton College in Fullerton, California and worked at Santiago Canyon College in Orange, California. He settled in Irvine, California, and became a clergyman at a Greek Catholic Church there, but also worked as a business analyst.

Terheș was involved in Romanian politics, especially in opposition to the ruling PSD, which he called corrupt. He became famous in 2012, when he was part of the referendum campaign on the dismissal of Romanian President Traian Băsescu; he lobbied for Băsescu (who was opposed to the Social Democrats) in the United States Congress. In 2014, Terheș opposed the election of Victor Ponta (from the PSD) as president.

In 2016, he became a regular commentator on the Antena 3 television station affiliated with the PSD and on România TV. At the same time, he became a supporter of the ruling PSD, in his public comments he supported the suspension of the liberal national president Klaus Iohannis. In 2019 he ranked fourth on the PSD list for the European Parliament and was elected a member of the European Parliament. Due to political activity incompatible with his status as a priest, the Romanian Catholic Eparchy of Oradea Mare released him in 2019 from the exercise of priestly functions.

In May 2020, Terheș declared his transition to the National Peasant Christian Democratic Party and the European Conservatives and Reformists group. On 11 November 2021, he lodged an application with the European Court of Human Rights in Strasbourg protesting various measures taken by the Romanian government to tackle the COVID-19 pandemic, alleging a violation of Article 5 (the right to liberty and security). His application was rejected by the ECtHR on grounds of inadmissibility, with the Court noting that the measures "could not be equated with house arrest" and that Terheș had failed to explain their impact on his personal situation. In February 2022, he criticized in a press conference Prime Minister Justin Trudeau's handling of the Canada convoy protest, comparing him with Nicolae Ceaușescu. In August 2023, he accused the European Union of introducing an "Orwellian ministry of truth" to tackle fake online news.

Terheș is known for his statements about what he thinks are ills of COVID-19 vaccinations and pandemic-related restrictions in Romania. He used a speech in September 2021 in the European Parliament to state that coronavirus experimental vaccines are not safe.

In July 2023, it was announced that Terheș would be a candidate for the Alliance for the Union of Romanians in the 2024 European Parliament election.
