= Romanian Village Party =

Romanian Village Party Partidul Satului Românesc
- Abbreviation: RoSAT
- President: Marian Vișu-Iliescu
- Founded: July 2021
- Ideology: Agrarianism; Romanian nationalism Christian democracy Monarchism; Soft Euroscepticism
- Political position: Centre-right (self-description); Far-right (alleged)
- National affiliation: AUR Alliance (2023–2024)

The Romanian Village Party (Romanian: Partidul Satului Românesc, RoSAT) is a Christian-democratic and agrarian political party in Romania, founded and headed by Marian Vișu-Iliescu.

RoSAT describes itself as a centre-right party. However, various sources labeled the party as far-right, with Radio Free Europe labelling it as an Eurosceptic anti-immigration party.

On 21 November 2023 it became one of the founding members of the Sovereigntist Alliance led by the Alliance for the Union of Romanians.
