= National Peasant Alliance =

Romanian political party

National Peasant Alliance Alianța Național Țărănistă
- Abbreviation: ANȚ
- President: Radu Ghidău
- General Secretary: Horia Radocea
- First Vice-president: Florin Alecu Diaconu
- Vice-presidents: Dragoș Corvin Oncescu; Tudorel Chesoi; Claudiu Dan Iamandi
- Founders: Radu Ghidău
- Founded: November 2019
- Headquarters: Strada N. Constantinescu nr. 7, Bucharest
- Ideology: Self-declared: Agrarianism; Christian democracy; Romanian nationalism
- Senate: 0 / 136
- Chamber of Deputies: 0 / 330
- European Parliament: 0 / 33
- Mayors: 7 / 3,176
- County Councilors: 0 / 1,340
- Local Council Councilors: 12 / 39,900

Website
- taranistii.eu

The National Peasant Alliance (Romanian: Alianța Național Țărănistă, ANȚ or, alternatively, Romanian: Țărăniștii) is a political party in Romania which was founded in November 2019 by Radu Ghidău (the youngest elected MP on behalf of PNȚ-CD during the 1996–2000 legislature) as an alternative to the PNȚ-CD then and currently led by Aurelian Pavelescu.

So far, it solely competed in the 2020 Romanian local elections, where it most notably scored modest results in Bucharest. The National Peasant Alliance (ANȚ) is currently an extra-parliamentary political party given the fact that it did not compete for the previous 2020 Romanian legislative election. Nonetheless, it did compete in the 2020 Romanian local elections, the latest Romanian local elections, where it only won 12 local councillors.

== History ==
At the point of its foundation (namely in November 2019), ANȚ was described as a modern political party by founding member Tudorel Chesoi (who is one of the incumbent vice-presidents of the party as well), stating at the same time that "Pavelescu and Țapliuc [i.e. the head of PNȚ-CD Constanța local branch] don't exist".

The party was established by former longtime old PNȚ-CD members who found themselves in opposition against the leadership of Pavelescu and who also expressed disdain over the alignment of PNȚ-CD towards the PSD in 2019 for that year's European Parliament election as well for the presidential election, at which Pavelescu formally supported ex-Prime Minister Viorica Dăncilă.

Subsequently, the party proceeded to competing in the 2020 Romanian local elections, in the wake of which they have gained 12 local councillor seats nationwide. Nonetheless, the ANȚ did not eventually compete for the 2020 Romanian legislative election which still took place during the COVID-19 pandemic in Romania. Therefore, it is a microparty.

== Electoral sign ==
The electoral sign of the National Peasant Alliance (ANȚ) is the flaming torch.

== Leadership ==
As of November 2021, the ANȚ has the following leadership: Radu Ghidău (President), Florin Alecu Diaconu (First Vice-president), Horia Valerian Radocea (General secretary), Dragoș Corvin Oncescu (Vice-president), Tudorel Chesoi (Vice-president), Claudiu Dan Iamandi (Vice-president). In addition, there are two alternate members (Romanian: Membrii supleanți), more specifically Marian Voicu and Victor Steharu.
