= The Right Alternative =

The Right Alternative Alternativa Dreaptă
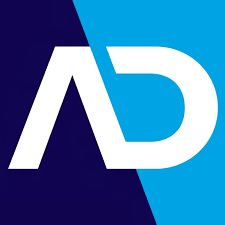
- Abbreviation: AD
- President: Adela Mirza
- Founded: 9 August 2019
- Headquarters: Corneliu Coposu bvd., no. 1 D/1/21, Bucharest
- Ideology: National conservatism; Classical liberalism; Libertarian conservatism; Christian right; Social conservatism; Soft Euroscepticism
- Political position: Right-wing
- European affiliation: European Conservatives and Reformists Party
- Senate: 0 / 135 (0%)
- Chamber of Deputies: 0 / 330 (0%)
- European Parliament: 0 / 33 (0%)
- Mayors: 1 / 3,176
- County Councilors: 0 / 1,340
- Local Council Councilors: 83 / 39,900

Website
- alternativadreapta.ro

The Right Alternative (Romanian: Alternativa Dreaptă, AD) is a minor right-wing political party in Romania. It was founded and registered on 9 August 2019.

The Right Alternative is a member of the European Conservatives and Reformists party. It merged into the Romanian National Conservative Party (PNCR) on 23 August 2024, along with the National Rebirth Alliance (ARN); however, this merger was called off on 13 September 2024, due to former prime minister Viorica Dăncilă joining the party, creating a sense of displeasure regarding her political past and her association with the Social Democratic Party (PSD).

== Electoral history ==
=== Legislative elections ===
Election	Chamber			Senate			Position	Aftermath
Election	Votes	%	Seats	Votes	%	Seats	Position	Aftermath
2020	2,005	0.03	0 / 330	2,233	0.04	0 / 136	17th	Opposition to PNL-USR PLUS-UDMR government (2020–2021)
2020	2,005	0.03	0 / 330	2,233	0.04	0 / 136	17th	Opposition to PNL-UDMR minority government (2021)
2020	2,005	0.03	0 / 330	2,233	0.04	0 / 136	17th	Opposition to CNR government (2021–present)
2024	TBD	TBD	TBD	TBD	TBD	TBD	TBD	TBD

=== European elections ===
Election	Votes	Percentage	MEPs	Position	EU Party	EP Group
2024	40,281	0.45%	0 / 33	11th	ECR	
