= University of Petroșani =

University in Petroşani, Romania

Coordinates: 45.4196°N 23.3768°E

University of Petroșani is a university located in Petroșani, Hunedoara County, Romania. This university was established in 1948. The college offers both undergraduate and post-graduate courses.
