= Romanian Nationhood Party =

Romanian nationalist political party

Romanian Nationhood Party Partidul Neamul Românesc
- Abbreviation: NR; PNR
- President: Ninel Peia
- General Secretary: Constantin Onișor
- Founded: 15 January 2019
- Split from: Social Democratic Party; Alliance for the Union of Romanians
- Ideology: Romanian ultranationalism; National conservatism; Anti-immigration; Euroscepticism; Anti-Islam; Anti-globalization; Romanian-Moldovan unionism; Economic nationalism; Right-wing populism
- Political position: Far-right
- Religion: Romanian Orthodox Church
- National affiliation: Romanian Sovereigntist Bloc
- Colours: Yellow
- Senate: 0 / 136
- Chamber of Deputies: 0 / 330

Website
- Official website

The Romanian Nationhood Party (Romanian: Partidul Neamul Românesc, NR or PNR) is a far-right, Romanian nationalist political party. It was founded by Ninel Peia, a former member of the Social Democratic Party (PSD). The party is critical of Hungarian-born American billionaire George Soros.

== Electoral history ==
=== Legislative elections ===
| Election | Chamber | | | Senate | | | Position | Aftermath |
| Election | Votes | % | Seats | Votes | % | Seats | Position | Aftermath |
|---|---|---|---|---|---|---|---|---|
| 2020 | 535,828 | 9.08 | 4 / 330 | 541,935 | 9.17 | 1 / 136 | 4th (within AUR) (Note: NR had signed a protocol with AUR to have their candidates elected on AUR's list) | Opposition to PNL-USR PLUS-UDMR government (2020–2021) |
| 2020 | 535,828 | 9.08 | 4 / 330 | 541,935 | 9.17 | 1 / 136 | 4th (within AUR) | Opposition to PNL-UDMR minority government (2021) |
| 2020 | 535,828 | 9.08 | 4 / 330 | 541,935 | 9.17 | 1 / 136 | 4th (within AUR) | Opposition to CNR government (2021–present) |

=== Presidential elections ===
| Election | Candidate | First round | | | Second round | | |
| Election | Candidate | Votes | Percentage | Position | Votes | Percentage | Position |
|---|---|---|---|---|---|---|---|
| 2019 | Ninel Peia | 30,884 | 0.34% | 12th | not qualified | | |
