= Romanian National Conservative Party =

Romanian National Conservative Party Partidul Național Conservator Român
- Abbreviation: PNCR
- Leader: Cristian Terheș
- Founder: Petre Cristian Bărnuțiu
- Founded: 3 October 2023
- Split from: PNȚCD
- Ideology: National conservatism Christian right Right-wing populism Anti-communism
- Political position: Right-wing
- National affiliation: AUR Alliance (2023–2024)
- European affiliation: European Christian Political Party
- European Parliament group: European Conservatives and Reformists Group
- Colours: Blue
- Chamber of Deputies: 0 / 330 (0%)
- Senate: 0 / 135 (0%)
- European Parliament: 1 / 33

Website
- pncr.ro

The Romanian National Conservative Party (Romanian: Partidul Național Conservator Român, PNCR) is a Romanian right-wing political party, founded in late 2023 by Petre Cristian Bărnuțiu. In December 2023, MEP Cristian Terheș left PNȚCD and joined the party, becoming its leader, and the party under his leadership joined the AUR Alliance. Terheș became the head of the AUR Alliance list for the 2024 European Parliament election in Romania, and under his leadership the alliance won second place and 6 seats in the European Parliament.

== History ==
The Romanian National Conservative Party was initially registered on 4 October 2023, and was finally registered on 7 November 2023. According to the party, its founder, Petre Cristian Bărnuțiu, is the great-grandson of Simion Bărnuțiu, the ideologist of the revolutionary national movement of Transylvanian Romanians in 1848.

On 10 December 2023, at the party congress, MEP Cristian Terheș was elected as its chairman. On 1 December 2023, Terheș joined the PNCR, leaving the Christian Democratic National Peasants' Party and depriving it of representation in the European Parliament. Terheș said that "in the face of globalist neo-Marxist attacks that want to transform the EU from a union of sovereign states into an empire led from Brussels by unelected bureaucrats, the solution is to defend national values, and this is what the PNCR will do".

On 14 December 2023, Alliance for the Union of Romanians leader George Simion announced that PNCR had joined the AUR Alliance to participate in the 2024 elections. PNCR leader Terheș became the leader of the AUR Alliance list for the 2024 European Parliament election in Romania.

As of May 2024, PNCR was a member of the European Christian Political Party, and of the European Conservatives and Reformists group in the European Parliament.

On 9 June 2024, PNCR leader Terheș was re-elected as a Member of the European Parliament on the AUR Alliance list. Five members of the Alliance for the Union of Romanians were elected from the alliance list too. On 19 June 2024, all 6 elected AUR Alliance MEPs were accepted into the European Conservatives and Reformists group.

== Ideology ==
According to the PNCR, the platform consists of promoting the defense and promotion of Romanian conservative, constitutional and national values both in Romania and abroad, as well as sovereignty, integrity and national unity. PNCR states that it intends to promote the values of the supremacy of the Constitution, sovereignty, Christian values and the market economy.

Cristian Terheș was previously known for his outspoken campaigns against the COVID-19 lockdown and vaccinations, as well as his support for accepting Ukrainian refugees.

== Electoral history ==
=== Parliamentary election ===
Election	Chamber			Senate			Position
Election	Votes	%	Seats	Votes	%	Seats	Position
2024	45,687	0.49	0 / 330	50,287	0.54	0 / 136	13th

=== Presidential election ===
Election	Candidate	First round			Second round		
Election	Candidate	Votes	Percentage	Position	Votes	Percentage	Position
2024	Cristian Terheș	95,782	1.04	9th	-		
2025	Cristian Terheș	36,445	0.39	8th	-		

=== European Parliament elections ===
Election	Votes	%	MEPs	Position	EU Party	EP Group
2024	1,334,905	14.93	1 / 33	2nd (within AUR Alliance)^{1}	ECPM	ECR

Notes:

^{1} AUR Alliance members: AUR (5 MEPs), PNCR (1 MEP) and the other party members did not achieve any mandates (ARN, PRR and BUN).
