= Supreme Council of National Defence (Romania) =

Administrative authority in Romania

The Supreme Council of National Defence (Romanian: Consiliul Suprem de Apărare a Țării; CSAT) is the autonomous administrative authority in Romania, invested by the Constitution with the task of organising and coordinating, by unanimous decisions, the activities related to the country's defence and national security.

== Control ==
The activity of the Council is examined by the Parliament. Annually, not later than the first trimester of the following year, if and when asked by the special committees of the Parliament, and also whenever necessary, the Council presents, in a joint session of the Chamber of Deputies and the Senate, its report on activities it has developed.

== Leadership and Members ==
- President of the Council: President of Romania
- Vice President of the Council: Prime Minister of Romania
- Members of the Council:
  - Minister of National Defence
  - Minister of Internal Affairs
  - Minister of Foreign Affairs
  - Minister of Justice
  - Minister of Economy
  - Minister of Finance
  - Director of the Romanian Intelligence Service
  - Director of the Foreign Intelligence Service
  - Chief of the General Staff
  - Presidential Advisor for National Security
  - Secretary of the Supreme Council of National Defence
