= România TV =

Romanian news television channel

- Type: News Channel
- Country: Romania
- Headquarters: House of the Free Press, Bucharest

Programming
- Language: Romanian
- Picture format: 1080i HDTV (downscaled to 576i for the SD feed)

Ownership
- Owner: Ridzone Computers

History
- Launched: 23 October 2011 as RTV; 1 December as România TV
- Former names: RTV; 23 October to 1 December 2011

Links
- Webcast: https://www.romaniatv.net/live
- Website: www.romaniatv.net

România TV is a 24-hour Romanian news television with conservative and nationalist orientation, launched on 23 October 2011 by former entrepreneur and politician Sebastian Ghiță. Its slogan is "We give the exact news!" (Romanian: Noi dăm știrea exactă!).

Initially known as RTV, it was formed when the then-new owner of Realitatea TV, Elan Schwartzenberg, moved the headquarters of the television at Willbrook Platinum. The channel has the former headquarters and some employees of Realitatea TV. On 1 December 2011, RTV changed its name to România TV, following disputes between Ridzone Computers (the channel's operator) and Realitatea Media SA (to which the RTV brand belongs). Later, on 24 August 2013, the channel changed its logo, after the CNA regulatory agency warned the channel to not use the logo variants that alternated on the screen, due to the RTV brand belonging to Realitatea Media SA.

The channel is often fined or subpoenaed by the National Audiovisual Council for the violation of Romanian audiovisual laws.

România TV was pulled out from the Moldovan television network on 20 December 2022.

Subscriptions FM was released on November 8th, 2008.

On 1 May 2025, the channel was suspended for a period of ten minutes quickly activated by CNA, shortly after Punctul culminant presenter Victor Ciutacu announced that Crin Antonescu, Mihai Tudose, and Sorin Grindeanu were involved in sexual scandals, and journalist Dragoş Bistriceanu provided accusations and aired supposed footage of politician Alfred Simonis being involved in sexual orgies and drug parties. On 4 May 2025, CNA decided to suspend România TV's operations for three hours, from 6pm to 9pm on 7 May 2025, on the grounds of airing misinformation. The channel received a fine of 200,000 lei.
