= Captured Justice =

Romanian 2025 Documentary

- Romanian: Justiție capturată
- Directed by: Andreea Pocotilă; Mihai Voinea
- Story by: The erosion of the justice system in Romania
- Production company: Recorder
- Distributed by: YouTube
- Release date: 9 December 2025 (YouTube)
- Running time: 120 minutes
- Country: Romania
- Language: Romanian

Captured Justice (Romanian: Justiție capturată) is a Romanian investigative documentary film published by Recorder on YouTube on 9 December 2025. The film examines the state of the Romanian justice system in 2025, focusing on the widespread use of statutory limitations in criminal cases and the effects of power centralisation within a small number of judicial institutions.

The documentary was released one day before a ruling of the Constitutional Court of Romania concerning the pension system of magistrates, a timing that drew significant public attention and commentary.

On 10 December 2025, the documentary was broadcast by the public television channel TVR, where it recorded the second-highest audience rating of the year for the station, with approximately 382,000 viewers.

== Synopsis ==
Captured Justice is a two-hour investigative journalism project analysing internal mechanisms and systemic dysfunctions within Romania’s justice system over recent years. Filmed over a period of more than eighteen months, the documentary explores how evidence is annulled, how high-profile cases involving politically or economically influential figures—such as Marian Vanghelie, Cristian Burci and Gabriel Popoviciu —are delayed until statutes of limitation expire, and how political and judicial influence undermines judicial independence and public trust in the rule of law.

The film includes testimonies from within the judicial system, featuring prosecutors and judges speaking both openly and anonymously about institutional pressure, discretionary reassignment of judicial panels, and restrictive interpretations of the law leading to the exclusion of evidence. Interviews include statements from military prosecutor Liviu Lascu and former National Anticorruption Directorate (DNA) chief prosecutor Crin Bologa, alongside anonymous magistrates.

The central thesis of the documentary is that Romania’s justice system has been “captured” by a network of politically and judicially aligned interests, severely affecting anti-corruption efforts and the equal application of the law. The documentary features criticism of decisions and institutional practices associated with the leadership of senior judicial bodies, including those chaired by Lia Savonea and Marius Voineag.

== Reactions ==
The documentary generated widespread reactions from members of the judiciary, politicians, and civil society.

The leadership of the High Court of Cassation and Justice and the Bucharest Court of Appeal rejected the documentary’s allegations. High Court president Lia Savonea stated that the film contained claims she described as unsupported by data or inconsistent with reality.

On 11 December, the leadership of the Bucharest Court of Appeal held a press conference describing the documentary’s claims as false and misleading. The release of courtroom recordings during the conference was criticised by former judge Cristi Danileț as potentially unlawful.

In the days following the release, protests in support of judicial independence took place in Bucharest and other major Romanian cities.

Following the documentary’s release, an open letter circulated within the Romanian judiciary expressing solidarity with the judges and prosecutors who appeared in the film. The letter defended their right to speak publicly about perceived systemic dysfunctions within the justice system and criticised what the signatories described as attempts to discredit or intimidate magistrates who raise such concerns.

According to media reports, the letter was signed by several hundred magistrates, including current and former prosecutors and judges, among them prominent figures such as former chief prosecutor Laura Codruța Kövesi. The initiative was described by commentators as an unusually large show of internal support within Romania’s justice system.
