= 2025 Romanian anti-judicial corruption protests =

2025 Romanian protests for judicial independence
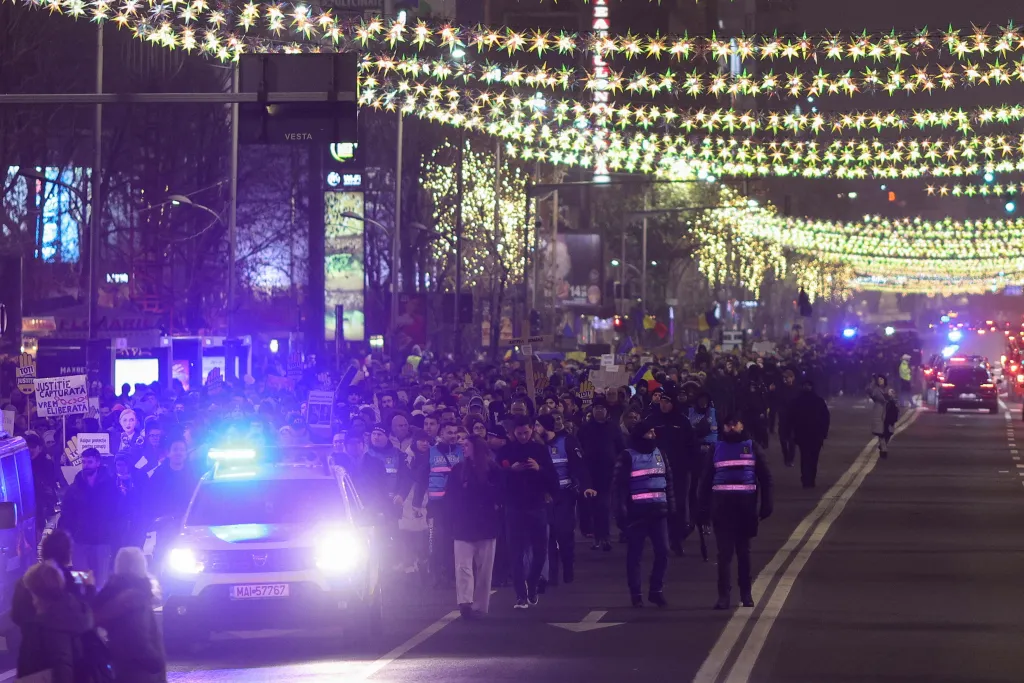
- Protesters for the independence of judicial system on 14 December 2025 going to Victoria Square in Bucharest
- Date: December 10, 2025 – December 20, 2025
- Location: Romania
- Caused by: The documentary Recorder that draws attention to supposed corruption and deficiency at the top of the justice system; Statute of limitations on major corruption cases
- Goals: Resignation of the President of the High Court of Justice, Lia Savonea; Resignation of National Anticorruption Directorate Chief Marius Voineag; Resignation of Minister of Internal Affairs Cătălin Predoiu; Revision of Superior Council of Magistracy powers; Legislative elimination of "loopholes" that allow criminal trials to be postponed until the statute of limitations has expired; Elimination of special pensions; Restarting the anti-corruption campaign
- Methods: Demonstrations; Online activism; Protest

Parties
Anti-corruption organizations; Protesters; Magistrates	President of Romania; Prime Minister of Romania; Minister of Internal Affairs	Superior Council of Magistracy; High Court of Cassation and Justice; National Anticorruption Directorate leadership

Number
Thousands		

In December 2025 a series of protests for judicial independence took part in Romania as a result of a journalistic documentary released by Recorder that drew attention to supposed corruption and deficiency at the top of the justice system of Romania.

== Background ==
In December 2025, after the release of journalistic investigation Captured Justice (Romanian: Justiție Capturată) by journalistic publication Recorder that present degradation of judiciary system of Romania, several spontaneous protests that took place after the publication of the documentary gained momentum.

== Events ==
On December 10, in Bucharest, several hundred people demonstrated in front of the headquarters of the Superior Council of Magistracy, demanding the resignation of Lia Savonea. On Thursday, the second day of protests, approximately 1,000 people gathered in Victoria Square, a place known for spontaneous anti-government protests. Spontaneous demonstrations also took place in Cluj-Napoca, Iași, and Timișoara. On Friday, December 12, approximately 4,500 protesters gathered to express their discontent in Victoria Square. On Saturday, December 13, the number of demonstrators jumped to almost 8,000 in Bucharest, but protests also took place in Cluj-Napoca, Craiova, Iași, Brașov, Sibiu, Constanța, Timișoara, Ploiești, Galați, Oradea, and Satu Mare across the country.

On the evening of Sunday, December 14, a new large-scale demonstration took place in Bucharest and in major cities across the country. In the capital, protesters gathered in University Square from where they marched to Victory Square. According to media estimates, between 8,000 and 10,000 participants took part in the action. In Cluj-Napoca, over 3,000 demonstrators marched through the city streets; other protests also took place in Timisoara, Iași, Craiova, Constanța, Buzău, Satu Mare, as well as in the Diaspora.

== See also ==
- 2017–2019 Romanian protests
