= Laura Codruța Kövesi =

Former Romanian anti-corruption judge and first European Chief Prosecutor (1973-)

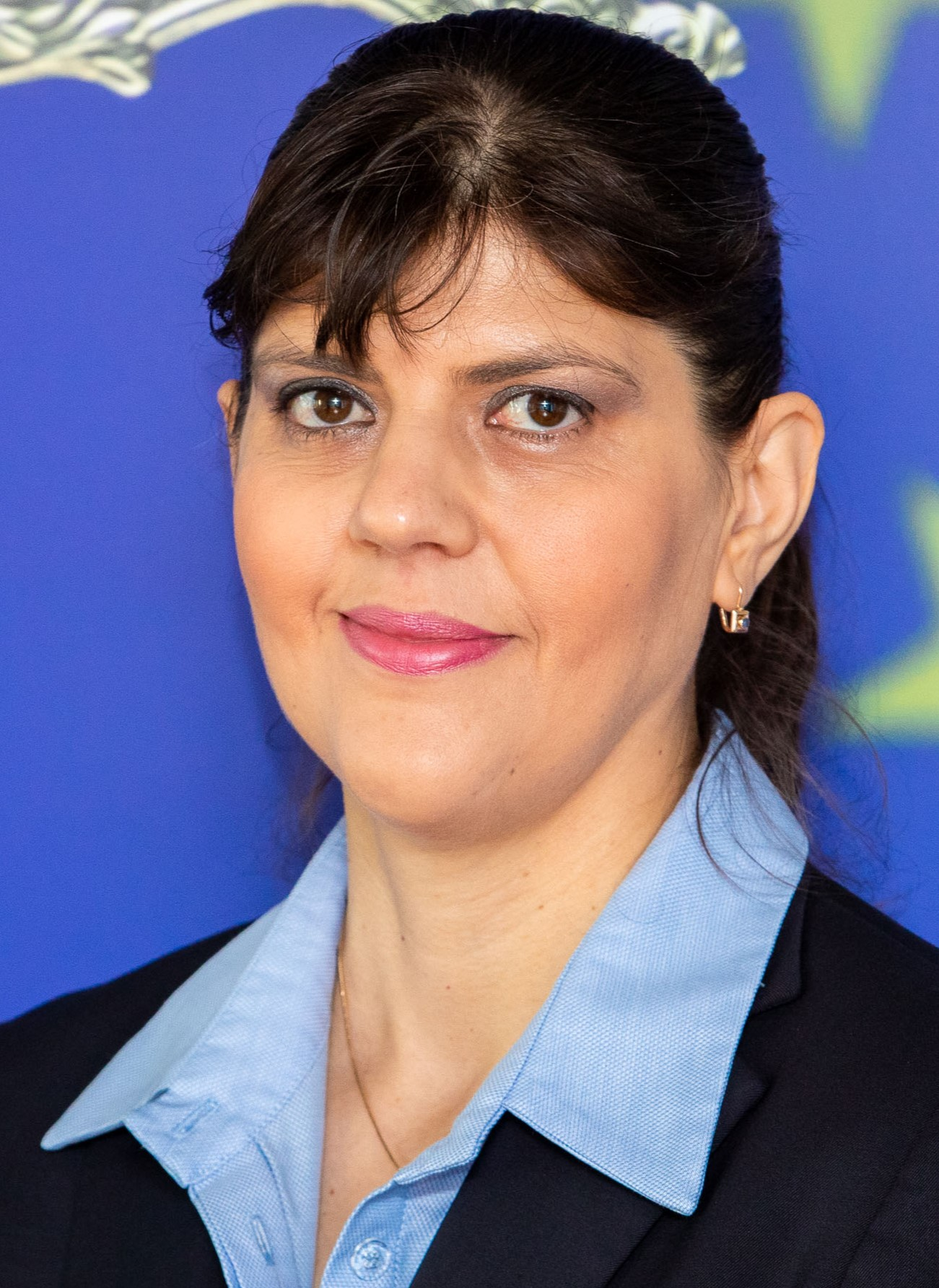
- Kövesi in 2022

European Chief Prosecutor
- Incumbent
- Assumed office 31 October 2019
- Preceded by: Position established

Chief Prosecutor of the National Anticorruption Directorate
- In office 17 May 2013 – 9 July 2018
- President: Traian Băsescu; Klaus Iohannis
- Preceded by: Daniel Morar
- Succeeded by: Marius Iacob (Acting)

Prosecutor General of Romania
- In office 2 October 2006 – 2 October 2012
- President: Traian Băsescu
- Preceded by: Ilie Botoș
- Succeeded by: Tiberiu Nițu

Personal details
- Born: Laura Codruța Lascu; 15 May 1973 (age 53) Sfântu Gheorghe, Covasna County, Romania
- Spouse: Eduard Kövesi (m. 2002; div. 2007)
- Education: Babeș-Bolyai University; University of Sibiu; West University of Timișoara

Laura Codruța Kövesi (née Lascu; Romanian: [ˈla.ura koˈdrut͡sa ˈkøveʃi]; born 15 May 1973) is the first European Chief Prosecutor and the former chief prosecutor of Romania's National Anticorruption Directorate (Romanian: Direcția Națională Anticorupție - DNA), a position she held from 2013 until she was fired on the order of Justice Minister Tudorel Toader on 9 July 2018. Prior to this, between 2006 and 2012 Kövesi was the Prosecutor General of Romania (Romanian: Procuror General), attached to the High Court of Cassation and Justice.

Upon appointment in 2006, Kövesi was the first woman and the youngest Prosecutor General in Romania's history. She is also the only public servant to have held the office of Prosecutor General for the entire duration of its term.

Kövesi was described by The Guardian in 2015 as a "quiet, unassuming chief prosecutor who is bringing in the scalps", leading "an anti-corruption drive quite unlike any other in eastern Europe – or the world for that matter". Her tenure as head of the DNA has substantially increased public confidence in the institution, both within Romania and across the EU, with a 2015 poll reporting that a high 60% of Romanians trust the DNA (compared to 61% for the Romanian Orthodox Church and only 11% for the parliament). In February 2016, Kövesi was renominated for chief prosecutor by the Ministry of Justice, based on the positive results achieved under her leadership.

In early 2018, Justice Minister Tudorel Toader proposed her dismissal as DNA chief prosecutor after presenting a report on her managerial activity at DNA based on 20 categories and allegations. Among the accusations were: excessive authoritarian behavior, discretion of the Chief Prosecutor of the DNA, involvement in other prosecutors' inquiries, prioritization of the files according to the media impact, violating the decisions of the Constitutional Court of Romania and signing illegal agreements with the Secret Services. President Iohannis initially refused to dismiss her, but a Constitutional Court decision forced him to do so, stating that he can only verify its legality, not the arguments that lead to the proposal.

In October 2019, after beating out competition from French magistrate Jean-François Bohnert, Kövesi was confirmed as the first European Chief Prosecutor.

On 5 May 2020, the European Court of Human Rights held that the aforementioned dismissal of Kövesi violated her right to a fair trial as well as her right to free speech.

== Life and studies ==
Born in Sfântu Gheorghe as Laura Codruța Lascu, Kövesi played professional basketball in her youth, at the club in Mediaș and in Sibiu, and was selected for the junior players national team which finished second in the 1989 FIBA Europe Under-16 Championship for Women. Between 1991 and 1995, she studied law at the Babeș-Bolyai University in Cluj Napoca. In 2012, Kövesi graduated with a Ph.D. in Law (for which she studied at the West University of Timișoara) with a thesis on combating organized crime.

Lascu married Eduárd Kövesi, an ethnic Hungarian, and kept his surname after their divorce in 2007. She speaks Romanian and English.

== Professional activity ==
Between 15 September 1995 and 1 May 1999, Kövesi was a prosecutor for the Court in Sibiu.

Between May 1999 and October 2012, Kövesi led the Directorate for Investigating Organized Crime and Terrorism (DIICOT) branch in Sibiu County.

On 2 October 2012, she replaced Ilie Botoș as the Prosecutor General of the Prosecutor's Office attached to the High Court of Cassation and Justice.

=== Direcția Națională Anticorupție (National Anticorruption Directorate) ===
Under Kövesi's leadership, the DNA made notable progress against high-level corruption in Romania. having prosecuted dozens of mayors (such as Sorin Oprescu), five MPs, two ex-ministers and a former prime minister in 2014 alone. Hundreds of former judges and prosecutors were also brought to justice, with a conviction rate above 90%. In 2015, 12 members of parliament were investigated, including ministers: "we have investigated two sitting ministers, one of whom went from his ministerial chair directly to pre-trial detention", Kövesi said.

As a result of the 2015 DNA yearly report, Kövesi declared that 431 million euros in bribes was the amount given in the cases that were presented to the Court.

Victor Ponta, former Prime Minister of Romania and the highest-ranking government official currently under DNA investigation and prosecution, accused Kövesi of being "a totally unprofessional prosecutor trying to make a name by inventing and imagining facts and untrue situations from 10 years ago". These comments were posted on his Facebook page, following his indictment on charges of forgery, money laundering, and tax evasion, brought against him by the DNA.

== Controversies ==
In 2018, former Romanian PM Victor Ponta posted a picture on his Facebook page in which Kövesi was sitting at the same table with politician Liviu Dragnea (former president of Social Democrat Party) and former head of Romanian Intelligence George Maior. Victor Ponta explained that the picture was taken at a birthday party back in 2014, while Liviu Dragnea was under investigation for corruption charges by National Anticorruption Directorate of which chief prosecutor was Kövesi. This sparked doubt over the neutrality with which Kövesi was leading the National Anticorruption Directorate.

In 2018, the Social Democratic Party-led government established the "Department for Investigating Judicial Offences" to investigate prosecutors. This was criticized by the Venice Commission, who considered that they would likely undermine the independence of the Romanian prosecutors and judges and public confidence in the judiciary.

Nevertheless, the government pushed forward, and, on 13 February 2019, Laura Codruța Kövesi was summoned by this institution as a suspect in a case in which the allegations are malfeasance in office, bribery and false testimony, following a complaint by Sebastian Ghiță, a fugitive politician and businessman prosecuted for corruption. On 7 March 2019, Kövesi was summoned and questioned by the prosecutors of the Department for Investigating Judicial Offences; at the end she was notified that she was a suspect in a second, different investigation, where she was accused of coordinating an "organized group of prosecutors" which prosecuted people illegally.

The Romanian High Court of Cassation and Justice disciplinary Prosecutor's Section issued a statement on 24 of June 2019, about one of the actions aimed at Laura Codruța Kövesi. Prosecutors have dismissed the disciplinary action initiated by the Judicial Inspection over the former DNA Chief. The Romanian High Court of Cassation considered her innocent.

== Merits and distinctions ==
- 2016: Legion of Honour, the highest honor of the French Republic through the French ambassador in Bucharest, François Saint-Paul. The distinction was offered for great devotion and 'extraordinary courage' in the fight against corruption, and for her contributions to civil society.
- 2016: Order of the Polar Star (Swedish: Nordstjärneorden), offered by the King of Sweden for her fight against corruption in Romania.
- 2016: European of the Year, Reader's Digest award.
- 2015: Prize from the Group for Social Dialogue.
- 2014: 'Courageous Women of Romania' prize from the United States Embassy.
- 2012: Order of the Star of Romania in the rank of Knight, awarded by the former President of Romania, Traian Băsescu.
- 2011: Ordre national du Mérite, Officer rank, offered by the President of France.
- 2011: 'Certificate of Appreciation for outstanding assistance and support on behalf of the law enforcement responsibilities of the United States Secret Service' awarded by the United States Secret Service Director.
- 2008: The “Cybercrime Fighter Award”, October 2008, awarded by the McAfee Company, U.S.A.
- 2007: 'Certificate of Appreciation for outstanding assistance and support on behalf of the law enforcement responsibilities of the United States Secret Service' awarded by the U.S. Secret Service Director.

== See also ==
- National Anticorruption Directorate
- Anti-Corruption General Directorate
- Romanian Intelligence Service
