= Mona Pivniceru =

Romanian politician (born 1958)

Judge of the Constitutional Court of Romania
- In office 2013–2022
- Preceded by: Ion Predescu
- Succeeded by: Laura-Iuliana Scântei

Minister of Justice
- In office 23 August 2012 – 27 March 2013
- Preceded by: Titus Corlatean
- Succeeded by: Robert Cazanciuc

Personal details
- Born: 9 September 1958 (age 67) Huși, Romania
- Party: Independent
- Education: University of Bucharest

Mona Maria Pivniceru (born 9 September 1958) is a Romanian politician, jurist and magistrate, university professor. Between 23 August 2012 and 27 March 2013 , she was Minister of Justice, in the Second Ponta cabinet. Between 2013 and 2022, she served as a judge of the Constitutional Court of Romania.

== Professional career ==
Since 1982, Mona Pivniceru has been a graduate of the Faculty of Law of the "Al I. Cuza" University of Iași, and two years later she passed the bar exam. In 1991 she entered the magistracy, and in 1999 she obtained her doctorate in law from the same university. In 2000, she was admitted to the doctorate in the specialization of Civil Law at the Faculty of Law of the University of Bucharest . During the period 1997-2007 she was an associate professor at the "Al. I. Cuza" University of Iași. In 2007, she became a university professor and doctoral supervisor for the disciplines of Public International Law, Legal Protection of Human Rights, European Convention on Human Rights and ECHR Practice - Master of Criminal Sciences. She obtained her second doctorate in 2008, at the University of Bucharest. She taught these disciplines until 2010, at the "Al. I. Cuza" University of Iași.

After graduating from the Faculty of Law of the Alexandru Ioan Cuza University in 1982, Mona Pivniceru began her professional career, working as a lawyer in the Vaslui Bar. She then worked as a judge at the Iași Court of Justice, and two years later she was appointed magistrate at the Iași Tribunal . A member of the Romanian Magistrates' Association since 1994, she was the president of the association from 2008 to 2011. In 1999 she became a magistrate at the Bucharest Court of Appeal, holding the position for 10 years. She was later elected judge at the High Court of Cassation and Justice. From December 2010 to July 2011 she worked at the Civil and Intellectual Property Section of the Supreme Court. On 23 July 2011, she resigned from all positions held until then, being elected judge at the Superior Council of Magistracy, holding the position until 23 August 2012. Minister of Justice from 23 August 2013 to 26 March 2013, in the Ponta I and Ponta II cabinets. At the end of March 2013, she became a judge at the Constitutional Court of Romania.

On 23 August 2012, Mona Pivniceru was appointed Minister of Justice by the interim President of Romania, Crin Antonescu, upon the proposal of Prime Minister Victor Ponta, after she had resigned from her position as a member of the Superior Council of Magistracy and as a judge at the High Court of Cassation and Justice in order to become a member of the executive branch. The decision to resign was made because, according to the Romanian Constitution, the position of judge is incompatible with any other public or private position, including that of minister, and its mere delegation was not sufficient to remove the incompatibility.

Mona Pivniceru was sworn in as Minister of Justice on Thursday, 23 August 2012 , at 5:30 p.m. On 27 March 2013, she resigned from her position as Minister to become a judge at the Constitutional Court, having been elected by the Senate.
