= The Group for Political Investigations =

The Group for Political Investigations (Romanian: Grupul de Investigații Politice – GIP) is a Romanian non-governmental organization established in 2005. GIP is a watchdog organization that carries on investigations and analysis related to politicians in Romania. It also monitors the activity of the state institutions and the way these institutions manage public funds. The Group for Political Investigations is headed by Mugur Ciuvică. In October 2016, the Group for Political Investigations accused Laura Codruța Kovesi, Chief Prosecutor of the National Anticorruption Directorate, of alleged plagiarism. GIP's claims were backed by the Association Group for Reform and University Alternative (GRAUR). In mid-November, the Ethics Committee of Timisoara's West University said 564 lines of Kovesi's doctoral thesis were similar to other sources. Experts said the notification regarding plagiarism in this case is partly justified and grounded. In December, the National Council for the Certification of University Titles, Diplomas and Certificates (CNATDCU) ruled that Laura Codruta Kovesi did not plagiarize her doctoral thesis, the passages that may be labeled as plagiarism representing only 4% of the thesis (20 pages of 444 pages).
