= Tudorel =

Tudorel is a Romanian male given name. Notable people with the name include:

- Tudorel Bratu (born 1991), Romanian rugby union player
- Tudorel Pelin (born 1969), Romanian footballer
- Tudorel Stoica (born 1954), Romanian footballer
- Tudorel Toader (born 1960), Romanian lawyer
