= Dumitru Popovici =

Romanian literary historian (1902–1952)

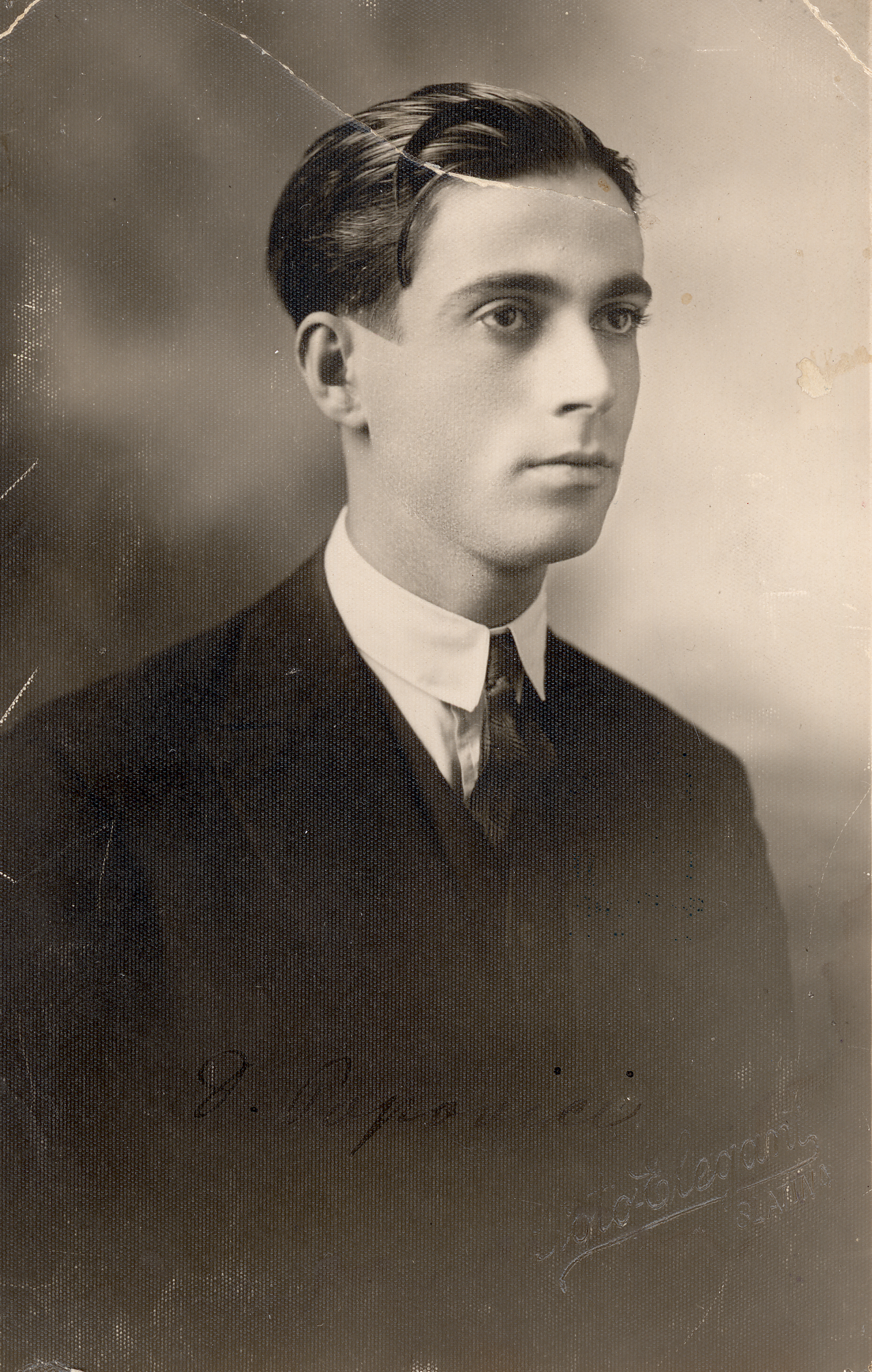
Dumitru Popovici

Dumitru Popovici (October 25, 1902–December 6, 1952) was a Romanian literary historian.

Born in Dăneasa, Olt County, his parents were Ioan Popovici, a teacher, and his wife Ioana (née Popescu). After attending primary school in nearby Șerbănești from 1909 to 1914, he studied at Radu Greceanu High School in Slatina from 1914 to 1923. Popovici then went to the literature faculty of the University of Bucharest from 1923 to 1927, earning a doctorate there in 1935. From 1924 to 1926, he was honorific teaching assistant to Dumitru Caracostea. He taught high school in Slatina (1927–1930) and Iași (1930–1936). From 1936 until his death, he was a professor in the literature faculty of the University of Cluj. From 1930 to 1934, he audited the Modern Greek courses of André Mirambel in Paris. He also took classes with Daniel Mornet, Fernand Baldensperger, Paul Hazard, and Mario Roques, shifting toward studies of comparative literature and working as a lecturer on the Romanian language at the Sorbonne and the École nationale des langues orientales vivantes.

Popovici published his first articles of literary history in the Slatina magazine Oltul in 1928. His proper debut as a critic took place in 1929 in Viața Românească, with the study Poezia lui Cezar Bolliac. He took part in founding (1935) and leading (1935-1936) Atheneum magazine in Iași. Popovici's first published book was his doctoral thesis, the 1935 Ideologia literară a lui I. Heliade-Rădulescu; this was followed later the same year by an expanded study, "Santa Cetate". Între utopie și poezie. During World War II, he lived in Sibiu, having withdrawn there after the Second Vienna Award granted Northern Transylvania, including Cluj, to Hungary. While there in 1942, he founded Studii literare magazine, which ran until 1948. He also held courses on the history of literary ideology and of modern Romanian literature, published a volume of studies (Cercetări de literatură română) and put together critical editions of the works of Dimitrie Bolintineanu (Scrieri alese, 1942) and Ion Heliade Rădulescu (Opere, vol. I-II, 1939 and 1943). He made plans for a wide-ranging history of modern Romanian literature, of which he managed to publish just the first volume, La Littérature roumaine a l’époque des Lumières (1945). He prepared a lithographed course book, Literatura română în epoca "Luminilor" și Literatura română modernă. Tendința de integrare în ritmul cultural occidental. Unedited fragments of this literary history were preserved as manuscript (Romantismul românesc) or lithographed courses (Eminescu în critica și istoria literară română; Poezia lui Mihai Eminescu). There remain in manuscript from his last years a series of literary projects and attempts: a partial translation of Dante Alighieri's Inferno; the poetry cycle Aur legendar; the opening of a novel with satirical elements, Într-o vară, la moșie; and numerous comedies, of which Bucătarul de la Salamandra (1946) and Regele din Propontide (1948-1950) were completed.

He married Elvira Chiffa, also a professor; the couple's daughter, Ioana Em. Petrescu, herself became a literary historian and critic.
