= Dăneasa =

- Commune
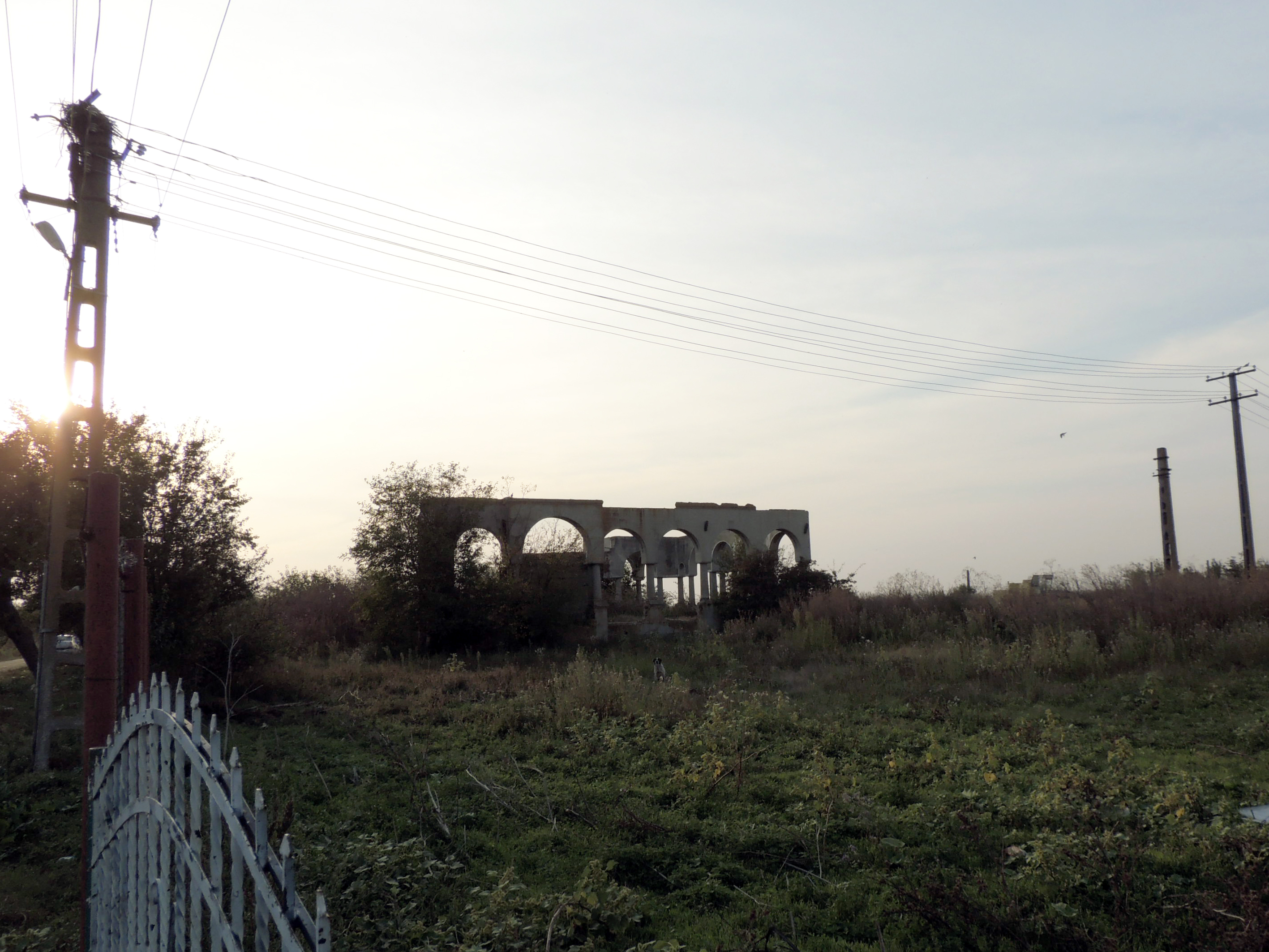
- Ruins of the Comăneanu mansion

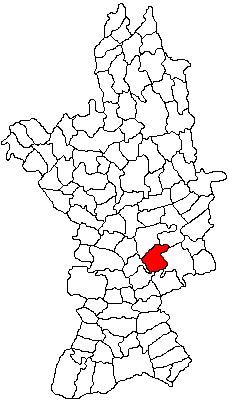
- Location in Olt County

- Location in Romania
- Coordinates: 44°9′N 24°34′E
- Country: Romania
- County: Olt

Government
  - Mayor (2020–2024): Nicolae Soare (PSD)
- Area: 57.32 km^{2} (22.13 sq mi)
- Elevation: 73 m (240 ft)
- Population (2021-12-01): 3,217
  - Density: 56.12/km^{2} (145.4/sq mi)
- Time zone: UTC+02:00 (EET)
  - Summer (DST): UTC+03:00 (EEST)
- Postal code: 237125
- Vehicle reg.: OT
- Website: www.primariadaneasaolt.ro

Dăneasa is a commune in Olt County, Muntenia, Romania. It is composed of five villages: Berindei, Cioflanu, Dăneasa, Pestra, and Zănoaga.

== Natives ==
- Dumitru Popovici (1902–1952), literary historian
