= Constantion Bădescu =

Romanian general (1892–1962)

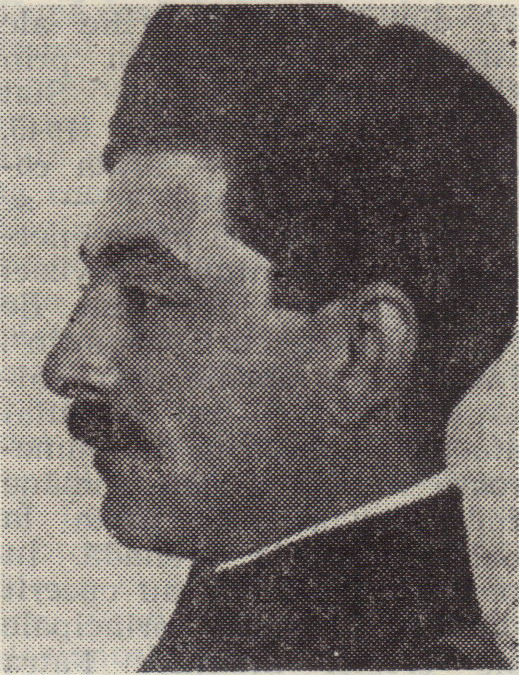
- Born: July 16, 1892; Mihăești, Vâlcea County, Kingdom of Romania
- Died: September 10, 1962 (aged 70) Bucharest, Romanian People's Republic
- Allegiance: Kingdom of Romania
- Branch: Romanian Land Forces
- Rank: Brigadier General
- Commands: 1st Dorobanți Infantry Regiment; 11th Division; 11th Brigade
- Conflicts: Second World War
- Awards: Order of the Star of Romania, Officer rank Order of Michael the Brave, 3rd class

Constantion Bădescu (July 16, 1892, in Mihăești, Vâlcea County – September 10, 1962, in Bucharest) was a Romanian brigadier-general during World War II.

Bădescu was born in Mihăești, Vâlcea County in 1892.

He served as commanding officer, 1st Dorobanți Infantry Regiment in 1941, but was called into reserve the following year. He retired in 1943, but was recalled in 1944 and served as commanding officer, 11th Brigade. In 1945, he first served as general officer commanding the 11th Division from 12 January to 18 February, then commanding officer of the 11th Brigade, and finally general officer commanding 11th Division again from 13 March to 12 May.

He retired in 1947, and died in Bucharest in 1962.

== Awards ==
- Order of the Star of Romania, Officer rank (8 June 1940)
- Order of Michael the Brave, 3rd class (4 August 1945)
