= Nicolae Popa (judge) =

Romanian judge (1939–2024)

31st President of the High Court of Cassation and Justice
- In office 14 July 2004 – 14 September 2009
- Appointed by: Ion Iliescu
- Preceded by: Paul Florea
- Succeeded by: Lidia Bărbulescu

Personal details
- Born: 1 September 1939 Mihăești, Vâlcea, Romania
- Died: 26 November 2024 (aged 85) Bucharest, Romania
- Resting place: Ghencea Cemetery
- Education: University of Bucharest

Nicolae Popa (1 September 1939 – 26 November 2024) was a Romanian judge, the president of the High Court of Cassation and Justice from 2004 to 2009.

== Life and career ==
Popa, born in Govora, Vâlcea County, graduated the University of Bucharest's Law Faculty in 1960, receiving a Doctorate in Law from that institution in 1975. Beginning in 1960, he taught in the same faculty, becoming a professor of general legal theory and judicial sociology in 1975. He was a member of the faculty's professorial council, as well as of the Nicolae Titulescu University Law Faculty professorial council. He also served as a thesis adviser in law.

In 1993, President Ion Iliescu named him a presidential adviser on legislative and judicial problems. He served in that capacity until 1996, when he was named to the Constitutional Court of Romania in order to fill the unexpired term of Ioan Deleanu. He served on that court until 2004, becoming its president on 7 June 2001. On 12 July 2004, Iliescu named him president of the High Court of Cassation and Justice, despite Popa not having the 18 years' experience as a judge required by law; he took the oath of office two days later. He remained in office until 14 September 2009, departing before his six-year term expired due to his having reached the mandatory retirement age of 70.

Popa held a 2003 doctor honoris causa degree from the Free International University of Moldova in Chişinău and was a 1973 graduate of an international seminar held in Salzburg on the subject of American law and legal institutions. From 1995 he was editor-in-chief of Revista de Drept Public.

Popa died on 26 November 2024, at the age of 85.
