= European Public Prosecutor's Office =

Agency of the European Union

- EPPO headquarters in Luxembourg City.

Body overview
- Formed: 12 October 2017
- Jurisdiction: European Union
- Headquarters: Kirchberg, Luxembourg City, Luxembourg
- Body executive: Andrés Ritter, European Chief Prosecutor
- Website: www.eppo.europa.eu

The European Public Prosecutor's Office (EPPO) is an independent body of the European Union with legal personality, responsible for investigating, prosecuting and bringing to judgment criminal offences affecting the financial interests of the European Union, including fraud, corruption, money laundering and serious cross-border VAT fraud. Established by Regulation (EU) 2017/1939 pursuant to Article 86 of the Treaty on the Functioning of the European Union, the EPPO became operational on 1 June 2021. It is headquartered in Kirchberg, Luxembourg City, alongside the Court of Justice of the European Union and the European Court of Auditors.

The EPPO is headed by the European Chief Prosecutor and operates through a central office in Luxembourg together with European Delegated Prosecutors located in the participating Member States. It is the first supranational public prosecution office empowered to conduct criminal investigations and prosecutions across national jurisdictions within the European Union.

The EPPO was established through the enhanced cooperation procedure after unanimity among the Member States could not be reached in the Council of the EU. Following Hungary's accession in 2026, Denmark and Ireland, which have opt-outs from the area of freedom, security and justice policy area, were the only member states which were not participating. As a result, the Regulation establishing the EPPO ceased to be an act adopted under enhanced cooperation and became fully part of the EU acquis, meaning that any future member state joining the European Union will be required to participate in the EPPO.

== History ==
The EPPO is located in Tower B of the Porte de l'Europe complex in Luxembourg, designed by Ricardo Bofill Taller de Arquitectura (right, with the twin towers of the Court of Justice of the European Union to the left)

=== Early proposals ===
It was strongly backed by the former Commissioner for Justice, Freedom and Security, Franco Frattini as part of plans to strengthen the Eurojust agency. Frattini stated in August 2007 that he is "convinced that Europe will have its general prosecutor in the future" and suggested that the commission was just waiting for the treaty to come into force. He stated that a prosecutor "could prove useful" in areas "where important European interests are at stake", namely in dealing with financial crime, fraud, and counterfeiting at the European level.

The signing, in late 2007, of the Lisbon Treaty by all Member States of the European Union, which refers explicitly to the idea of creating a European Public Prosecutor's Office to combat crimes affecting the financial interests of the Union and, where appropriate, to combat serious crime with a cross-border dimension, resulted in the conclusion of an International Seminar in Madrid to study the new institution and the possibilities of its implementation. The seminar was called by the Spanish Attorney General Cándido Conde-Pumpido and was led by Prosecutors Jorge Espina and Isabel Vicente Carbajosa. The presentations, discussions, and conclusions of the meeting were collected in a book, The future European Public Prosecutor's Office, in English and Spanish, and have served to date to guide the proposals and jobs that have been carried out in the implementation of this institution.

Following the short selling of certain eurozone financial products in 2009 and 2010, Spain proposed that the EU enact the European Public Prosecutor's Office provision so the post could coordinate legal action in retaliation. "Spain wants the European Union to use a planned public prosecutor's office for the region to protect the euro currency against speculators", Spanish attorney general Cándido Conde-Pumpido said in March 2010.

In March 2010 Eurojust cited the European Public Prosecutor's Office as a potential solution to the problem of cross-border crime in the EU. Despite opposition from some member states seeing it as impinging on their sovereignty (partly due to the necessary harmonisation of legal codes), Eurojust set up a working group to study the idea.

=== Spanish Presidency draft for the implementation of the EPPO ===
In March 2010, during the Spanish Presidency, the Spanish Attorney General Cándido Conde-Pumpido officially launched a draft for the implementation of the European Prosecutor, under the provision of Article 86 of the Treaty of Lisbon. Conde-Pumpido, speaking with the President of the Commission of Justice and Home Affairs of the European Parliament, Juan Fernando López Aguilar, and the Spanish Secretary of State for the European Union (SEUE), Diego López Garrido, presented a technical project, developed from the conclusions of the International Conference convened by the Spanish Prosecutor in 2008 and 2009, which would be discussed later in the Luxembourg Council.

The creation of this institution was subsequently discussed, according to the Spanish proposal, by the meeting of Ministers for Justice and Home Affairs held in Luxembourg on 27 April 2010, but its implementation was suspended until a new discussion in 2013.

=== Seminar of the Belgian Presidency and Eurojust in Bruges ===
On 21 and 22 September 2010, Eurojust, in co-operation with the Belgian Presidency of the Council of the European Union, held a strategic seminar, "Eurojust and the Lisbon Treaty: towards more effective action", "Establishment of the European Public Prosecutor's Office from Eurojust?", at the College of Europe in Bruges, Belgium.

The goals of the seminar were the development of Eurojust in light of the Lisbon Treaty and the possible establishment of a European Public Prosecutor's Office from Eurojust under Article 86 TFEU.

=== Barroso Commission proposals ===
The European Commission President José Manuel Barroso said on 12 September 2012 in his speech to the European Parliament on the state of the Union, that the next presentation of a proposal for the creation of a European Public Prosecutor would come soon, based on "commitment to uphold the rule of law".

On 17 July 2013 the European Commission, at the initiative of Vice-president Viviane Reding and Commissioner Algirdas Šemeta, proposed a regulation for the establishment of a, European Public Prosecutor's Office (EPPO).

The proposal was then discussed by the representatives of the EU Member States' experts under the specific procedure set by Article 86 of the Treaty. The following 3 main options were considered within the range of options concerning the scope of the initiative to tackle offences against PIF (protection of financial interests):

- Doing nothing – criminal investigations of PIF offences are (still) conducted by Member State authorities exclusively;
- Setting-up the EPPO with a limited mandate (PIF offenses) – EPPO has priority competence to order investigations and direct prosecutions into PIF offences
- Setting up the EPPO with an extended mandate (PIF offences and serious cross-border crimes) – EPPO has exclusive/shared competence to order investigations and direct prosecutions into PIF offences and other serious cross-border crimes (money laundering, corruption, accounting offences).

Besides these three options regarding scope, the Commission needed to consider a series of significant legal, institutional, and organisational matters (relationship with Eurojust, OLAF, member state authorities, judicial review) which could be formulated as sub-options. Moreover, particular procedural issues (EP involvement, legislative process, what if unanimity requirements are not met, enhanced cooperation with which member states, etc.) needed to be considered in these options. In accordance with Article 86, the proposal could include one or more regulations covering different aspects of the setting up of an EPPO. Soft law instruments were not relevant as legislative measures were needed to address criminal offences and law enforcement.

Likely impacts will include a more effective, dissuasive, and equivalent criminal law protection of the Union's financial interests. Irregularities affecting the European budget may reach or exceed €1 billion per year, from which around €280 million could be suspected EU fraud cases to be investigated within the EPPO's competence. This amount could be significantly reduced if the EPPO were to direct investigations and prosecutions throughout the EU, acting on all cases of PIF offences. Moreover, economies of scale might be achieved for the benefit of justice budgets of participating Member States, due to a streamlining of the judicial procedures involving EU financial interests across the EU.

Depending on how the relationship between the EPPO and the national authorities would be defined, the impact would be primarily on national police and judicial authorities, which would certainly have to cope with the new framework for investigations and prosecutions ordered by the EPPO. The administrative burden would depend on the new relations established between the EPPO and the national authorities, and whether the initiative would impose new information obligations on Member States.

Preparatory work, in particular the 2001 Green paper on the establishment of a European Prosecutor, was taken into consideration. Existing studies and evaluations, in particular the Criminal Justice Systems Study, the Euroneeds Study, the Pretrial investigative model rules, the Spanish Presidency Report, officially launched in Brussels in March 2010, etc., and studies regarding Eurojust, provided valuable input.

=== National and European Parliaments ===
In November 2013 the Commission concluded that the establishment of a European Public Prosecutor's Office complied "with the principle of subsidiarity" in a report addressing the issue after it was raised by 14 national parliamentary chambers in 11 Member States. The European Parliament subsequently voted in favour of the commission's proposal to set up the body. On 23 September 2019, the European Parliament and the Council of the European Union agreed to appoint Laura Codruța Kövesi as European Chief Prosecutor.

== Role and structure ==
The role of the EPPO is to investigate and prosecute fraud against the budget of the European Union and other crimes against the EU's financial interests including fraud concerning EU funds of over €10,000 and cross-border VAT fraud cases involving damages above €10 million. Previously, only state authorities could investigate and prosecute these crimes and could not act beyond their borders. OLAF, Eurojust, and Europol could not similarly act. The body is intended to be decentralised, based around European Delegated Prosecutors located in each participating Member State. The central office consists of a European Chief Prosecutor supported by 22 European Prosecutors, as well as technical and investigatory staff. The EPPO may request a suspect's arrest, but this must be confirmed by the relevant state authority.

The EPPO has a two-tiered structure and is described as a hybrid set-up. The European Chief Prosecutor heads the EPPO, represents it externally, and presides over its college. Two deputies assist the chief prosecutor and function as European Chief Prosecutor in the absence of the chief prosecutor. The determination of the working language of the EPPO is a decision-making matter of the College of the EPPO. Since 30 September 2020, Art. Paragraph 1 of the EPPO Decision 002/2020 stipulates that English is the working language for operational and administrative activities. According to Art. 1(2) of the same decision, the French language shall be used in conjunction with English in communications with the ECJ.

During the establishment of the EPPO, an interim director performed the duties under Art. 20 of the Regulation (EU) 2017/1939. According to Art. 20 para. 1 lit. a of the Regulation (EU) 2017/1939, an official of the commission was to be appointed as Interim Director after consultation with the council. He was responsible for the interim administrative apparatus and undertook, for example, recruitment (service contracts, etc.), see Art. 20 (2) of Regulation (EU) 2017/1939 and the provision of financial liquidity for the initial phase of the EPPO as well as the search for a suitable location in Luxembourg.

=== The College (Governing Body) ===
The College of the EPPO consists of the European Chief Prosecutor and one European Prosecutor per participating Member State – two of whom function as Deputies for the European Chief Prosecutor.

==== European Chief Prosecutor ====
The European Chief Prosecutor is the Head of the EPPO, in charge of organising its work and directing its activities, and is appointed by the European Parliament and the European Council for a non-renewable term of 7 years.

==== European Prosecutors ====
The European Prosecutors are distinct from the European Delegated Prosecutors and the European Chief Prosecutor. The European Prosecutors supervise the European Delegated Prosecutors, who conduct investigations on the ground in the participating Member States. At the end of July 2020, the first cohort of European Prosecutors was appointed by the Council of the EU. On 28 September 2020, the European Public Prosecutors were sworn in before the judge responsible at the European Court of Justice.

The decisions of the college are based on internal decision-making rules (Procedural Rules).

==== The Permanent Chambers of the EPPO ====
The Permanent Chambers of the EPPO each consist of three members. They are two European Prosecutors and, as chairperson, the European Chief Prosecutor or one of their deputies, or a European Prosecutor, cf. Art. 10 of the EPPO Regulation. The Chambers are responsible for controlling the investigations of the European Delegated Prosecutors. The Chambers decide above all on the filing of charges or the discontinuation of proceedings. The right of evocation of Art. 27 of Regulation (EU) 2017/1939 can also be ordered by the Chamber.

=== European Delegated Prosecutors (core of the EPPO's investigative work) ===
Looking at the EPPO's structure hierarchically, the European Delegated Prosecutors are below the Permanent Chambers. The European Delegated Prosecutors carry out their work locally, in their respective member states. In their work, they are independent, i.e. free from instructions by national authorities. At the member state level, the European Delegated Prosecutors are responsible for prosecuting PIF offences (see Brodowski for an overview). According to an internal EPPO agreement, there will be 140 European Delegated Prosecutors across the union.

The table below lists the number of candidates proposed and appointed per country (as of 2 August 2021):

| Country | Candidates proposed | Candidates appointed by College of the EPPO | Started working for the EPPO |
|---|---|---|---|
| Austria | 2 | 2 | 0 |
| Belgium | 2 | 2 | 1 |
| Bulgaria | 10 | 4 | 3 |
| Croatia | 2 | 2 | 2 |
| Cyprus | 2 | 2 | 0 |
| Czech Republic | 5 | 5 | 5 |
| Estonia | 2 | 2 | 2 |
| Finland | 1 | 1 | 0 |
| France | 5 | 4 | 4 |
| Germany | 11 | 11 | 11 |
| Greece | 7 | 5 | 0 |
| Hungary | 0 | 0 | 0 |
| Italy | 15 | 15 | 15 |
| Latvia | 4 | 4 | 4 |
| Lithuania | 4 | 3 | 3 |
| Luxembourg | 2 | 2 | 0 |
| Malta | 2 | 2 | 2 |
| Netherlands | 2 | 2 | 2 |
| Poland | | | |
| Portugal | 4 | 4 | 4 |
| Romania | 7 | 7 | 6 |
| Slovakia | 5 | 5 | 5 |
| Slovenia | 0 | 0 | 0 |
| Spain | 5 | 5 | 6 |
| Sweden | | | |

Source: EPPO News "European Delegated Prosecutors Overview per Country"

==== The Finnish Delay ====
When the EPPO launched its operations on 1 June 2021, Finland and Slovenia had failed to appoint their respective European Delegated Prosecutors. In Finland, the delay was due to a debate between the Finnish government wishing to only appoint part-time prosecutors because of a low expected workload, while European Chief Prosecutor Laura Kövesi insisted all European Delegated Prosecutors were to work on a full-time contract. A compromise was worked out at the beginning of June 2021 and the college appointed the Finnish European Delegated Prosecutor a month later.

==== The Janša Appointment Affair ====
Shortly before the repeatedly postponed but then set 1 June 2021 starting date of the EPPO, it emerged that Slovenia's acting head of government Janez Janša prevented the selection and nomination of two Slovenian European Delegated Prosecutors. In the wake of this, Slovenia's then Minister for Justice Lilijana Kozlovič resigned from her post on 27 May 2021. Kozlovič belongs to the smaller ruling party SMC and had asked the independent Prosecutorial Council to appoint two suitable candidates. ORF and other media reported that Janša might have opposed the nomination of the two prosecutors because they had also been involved in investigations against him in the past. Zdravko Počivalšek, Slovenia's Minister of Economy and head of the coalition party SMC, also intervened in the dispute. Počivalšek considered the appointment of only one European Delegated Prosecutor from Slovenia by Janša – the compromise Didier Reynders, EU Justice Commissioner, had proposed as an interim solution – to be an overstepping of competence by the government, the government to which he belongs. Počivalšek criticised the EU for exerting pressure in the matter of the hasty appointment of the European Delegated Prosecutors and pointed out that participation in the EU authority was voluntary. The European Chief Prosecutor countered and referred to the very long preparation time. She considers the non-appointment or untimely appointment to be a bad omen, so to speak.

The issue gained prominence as it coincided with Slovenia taking over the rotating presidency of the Council of the EU on 1 July 2021, causing many Members of the European Parliament and even European Commission President Ursula von der Leyen to urge Janša to swiftly appoint the Slovenian European Delegated Prosecutors during a parliamentary plenary debate.

== Legislative procedure through enhanced cooperation ==
The European Commission proposed a regulation on the establishment of a Public Procecutor's Office on 17 July 2013, based on a mandate in the Treaty of Lisbon to set up such an office. However, on 7 February 2017, the Council concluded that no consensus existed among the member states on the proposed regulation. As a result, 17 EU member states (Austria, Belgium, Bulgaria, Croatia, Czechia, Estonia, Finland, France, Germany, Greece, Latvia, Lithuania, Luxembourg, Romania, Slovakia, Slovenia, and Spain) requested on 14 February 2017 that the proposal be referred to the European Council for their consideration. After no agreement was reached at the European Council on 9 March 2017, 16 member states (the prior 17 less Austria, Estonia, and Latvia, plus Cyprus and Portugal) notified the European Parliament, the council, and the commission on 3 April 2017 that they would proceed with establishing the EPPO by the use of enhanced cooperation. This was done under TFEU Article 86, which allows for a simplified enhanced cooperation procedure that does not require authorization from the council to proceed. The participating member states agreed on the legislative text to establish the EPPO on 8 June 2017. By this point, Latvia and Estonia had begun participating in the enhanced cooperation procedure. The proposal was approved by the European Parliament on 5 October 2017, and on 12 October 2017, the regulation was given final approval by the 20 participating member states, which had grown to include Austria and Italy. The EPPO did not have the authority to begin investigating or prosecuting crimes until a decision of the Commission approved this, which per the terms of the Regulation could not take place until 3 years after the entry into force of the Regulation in November 2017. On 6 May 2021, the commission's decision to launch operations was adopted, with a starting date of 1 June 2021.

== EPPO members ==
EU members participating EU members not participating

25 EU member states participate in the enhanced cooperation. The original regulation was joined by 20 member states. Other member states, apart from Denmark which has an opt-out from the area of freedom, security and justice (AFSJ), are permitted to join subsequently. Ireland also has an opt-out from the AFSJ, but the form of its opt-out is more flexible, giving it the ability to opt in on a case-by-case basis.

Following the Rutte III Cabinet taking office the Netherlands officially requested to join the EPPO on 14 May 2018. Their participation was approved by the European Commission on 1 August 2018. Malta requested to join on 14 June 2018, and their participation was approved on 7 August 2018. Following the Tusk III Cabinet being installed as the government of Poland, it applied to join on 5 January 2024 to the Commission. The application was approved on 29 February 2024. On 13 November 2019 Stefan Löfven, Prime Minister of Sweden, declared that joining the EPPO was first among three EU policy objectives for his government. In March 2024, the Swedish government submitted a bill to parliament containing legislation to enable the country to join the EPPO, which was approved on 29 May. On 5 June 2024, the Swedish government notified its request to participate in the EPPO to the Council and the Commission, which the Commission approved on 16 July 2024.

Péter Magyar, leader of Hungary's Tisza Party which won the 2026 Hungarian parliamentary election, pledged before the election that his government would join the EPPO, in contrast with Viktor Orbán who had kept Hungary outside the EPPO. After the installment of his government, prime minister Magyar formally notified the Commission of Hungary's request to join the EPPO on 29 May 2026. The European Commission approved Hungary's request to join EPPO on 10 July 2026.

Following Hungary's accession in 2026, Denmark and Ireland, which have opt-outs from the Area of freedom, security and justice policy area, were the only member states which were not participating. As a result, the Regulation establishing the EPPO ceased to be an act adopted under enhanced cooperation and became fully part of the EU acquis, meaning that any future member state joining the European Union will be required to participate in the EPPO.

Ireland's government started preparing legislation to enable the country to participate in the EPPO in 2023. In May 2025, a review by the Irish Department of Justice recommended that Ireland should opt-in to most EU programs falling under the scope of the Area of freedom, security and justice, including the EPPO, and the Irish government accepted the review's recommendations. In November 2025, the Irish government said it intends to bring legislation allowing Ireland to opt-in to the EPPO during the first half of 2026 before the Irish presidency of the Council in the second half of the year.

Members

- Austria
- Belgium
- Bulgaria
- Croatia
- Cyprus
- Czech Republic
- Estonia
- Finland
- France
- Germany
- Greece
- Hungary
- Italy
- Latvia
- Lithuania
- Luxembourg
- Malta
- Netherlands
- Poland
- Portugal
- Romania
- Slovakia
- Slovenia
- Spain
- Sweden

Non-participants

- Denmark (opt-out)
- Ireland (opt-out, with ability to opt-in)

== Legal basis ==
The EPPO was provided for in Article 86 of the Treaty on the Functioning of the European Union by the Treaty of Lisbon. The article states the following:

Establishment

- The Council of the European Union, by a special legislative procedure, may establish a European Public Prosecutor's Office from Eurojust.
- This must be done by unanimity in the council and with the consent of the European Parliament.
- If the Council cannot reach unanimity, a group of at least nine member states may refer a draft to the European Council.
- Those member states may also proceed to establish enhanced cooperation between themselves after informing Parliament, the council, and the commission.

Role

- The office shall, in liaison with Europol, be responsible for investigating, prosecuting and bringing to judgment those connected to offences against the EU's financial interests.
- It shall exercise this function in the relevant national courts.
- The regulations establishing the office shall determine rules governing how it performs its duties including the admissibility of evidence.
- The European Council may amend the treaty, after consulting the commission and gaining the consent of Parliament, to extend its powers to include serious cross-border crime.

== List of European Chief Prosecutors ==
| N° | Portrait | Name | Term | Home country |
|---|---|---|---|---|
| 1 | | Laura Codruța Kövesi | 31 October 2019 – 31 October 2026 | Romania |
| 2 | | Andrés Ritter | 1 November 2026 – Present | Germany |

== Prospects for the future ==
So far, the limited mission of the EPPO is to investigate, prosecute and bring to judgement, before national courts, persons suspected of offences affecting the financial interests of the Union. The so-called 'PIF Directive' sets out what those offences are. However the mission of EPPO may also be extended in the future to cover other serious cross-border crimes. The functions of EPPO are carried out by European delegated prosecutors in the participating member states who have the same powers as national public prosecutors in addition to the powers conferred on them by Union law. For instance, the European delegated prosecutor can issue an EAW or request that a competent national judicial authority issue an EAW. The rules for European delegated prosecutors are primarily derived from the EPPO Regulation, which, however, frequently refers to national provisions at crucial points, for example in Article 26(1) on initial suspicion, Article 27(2) on evocation, Article 28(1) and (2) on conducting investigations, Article 29(1) on immunity, Article 30(1) and (4) on individual investigative measures and Article 33(1) on detention. Knowledge of the respective national legal situation in the Member States is therefore of considerable importance for the work of the European Public Prosecutor's Office.

== Budget and enlargement ==
In light of the acceleration of the disbursement of the EU recovery plan funds as well as the potential upcoming enlargement of EPPO to Poland and Sweden, in February 2024, EPPO formally asked for a €7.8 million increase of its 2024 budget, to reach a total of €79.7 million.

== See also ==
- Area of freedom, security and justice
- Craiova Group
- European Anti-Fraud Office
- Open Balkan
