= Radu Greceanu National College =

Romanian high school

Coordinates: 44.4319°N 24.3512°E

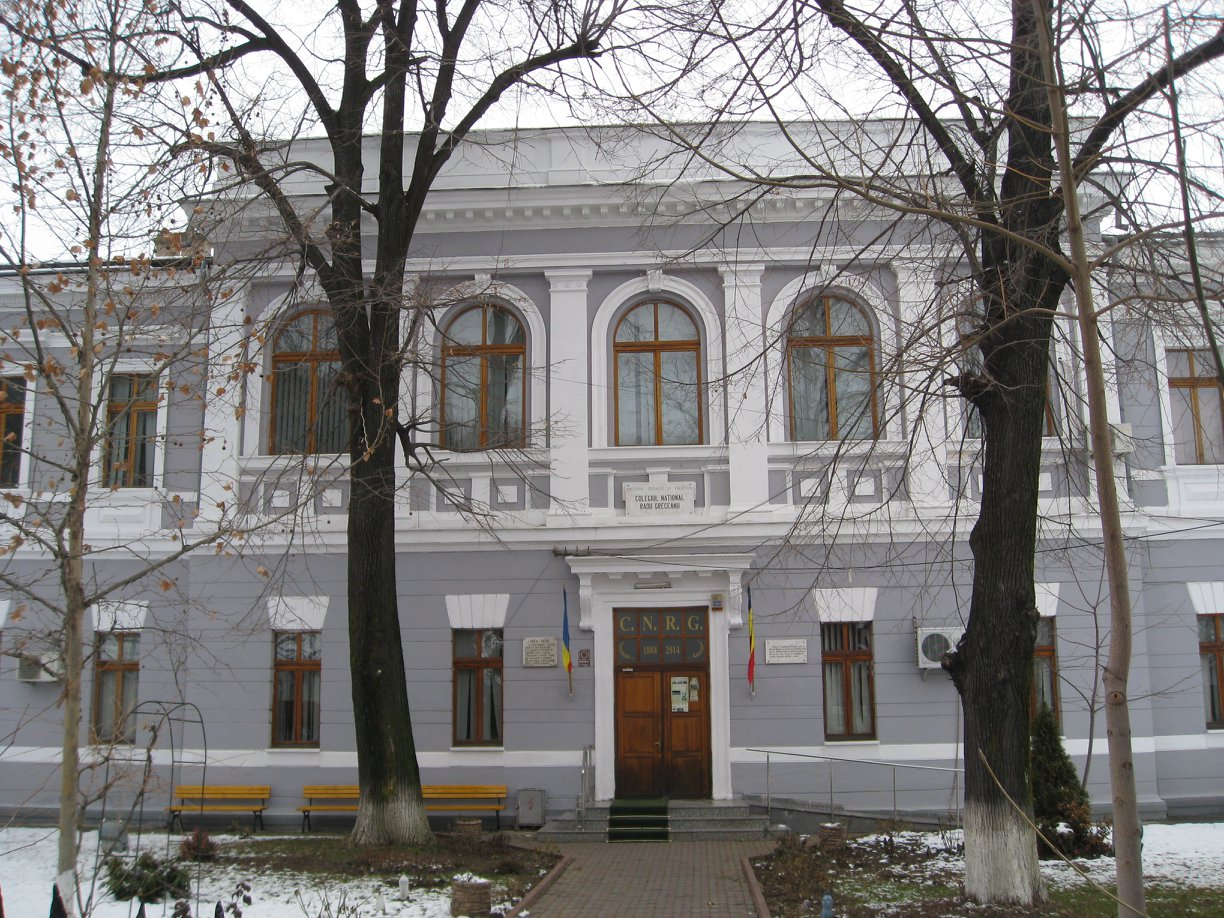
Radu Greceanu National College

Radu Greceanu National College (Romanian: Colegiul Național Radu Greceanu) is a high school located at 8 Nicolae Bălcescu Street, Slatina, Romania.

The school was established in 1886 and declared a gymnasium two years later. In 1891, it was named after Radu Greceanu, an 18th-century chronicler. It is a leading high school of Olt County.

The original school building was begun in August 1889 and completed in autumn 1891. A new wing was added in the 1920s, while an amphitheater and dormitory date to the following decade. Girls were admitted starting in the 1958–1959 school year, eventually leading to the construction of a second dormitory, completed in 1979. This was the last major addition.

The school building is listed as a historic monument by Romania's Ministry of Culture and Religious Affairs.

== Faculty ==
- Ion Irimescu
- Iuliu Moisil

== Alumni ==
- Gib Mihăescu
- Dumitru Popovici
- Ion Predescu
- Pan M. Vizirescu
