= Mihăești, Vâlcea =

Mihăești
- Commune
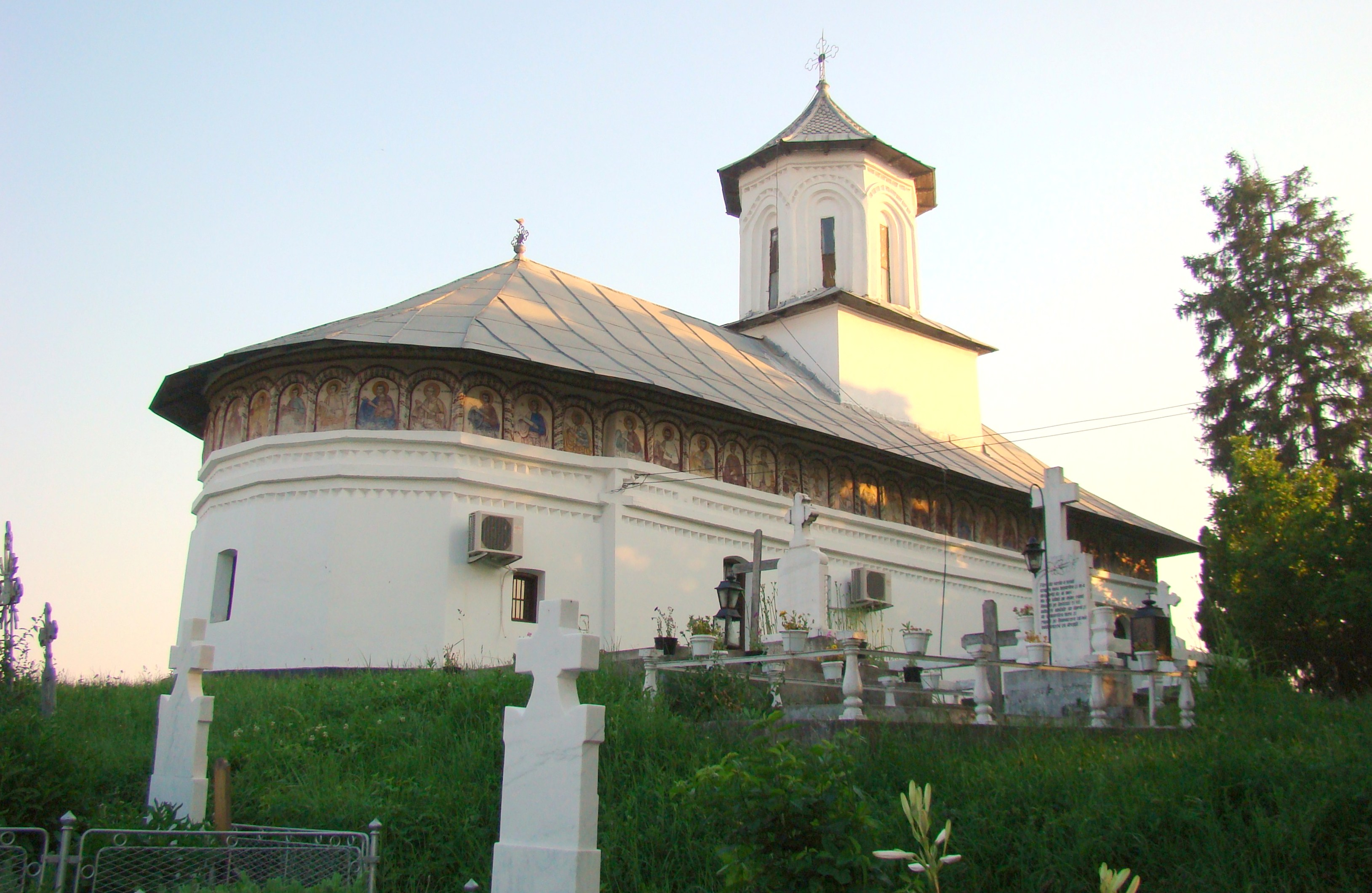
- Saint John the Baptist Church in Măgura

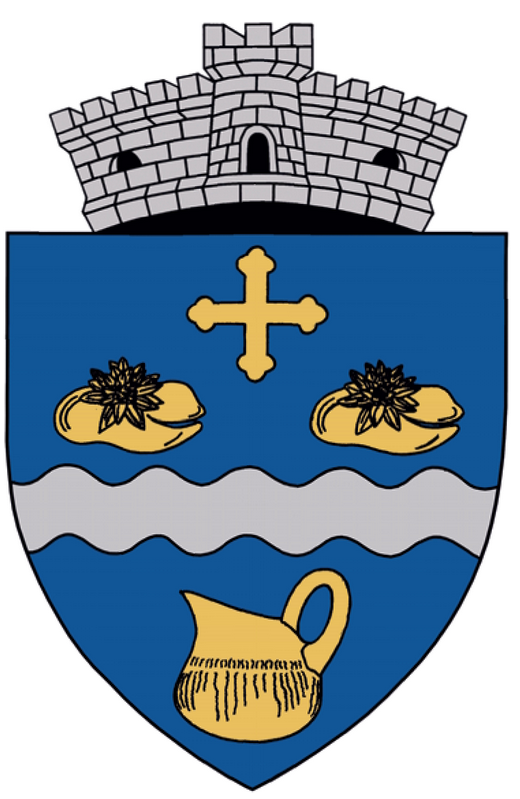
- Coat of arms

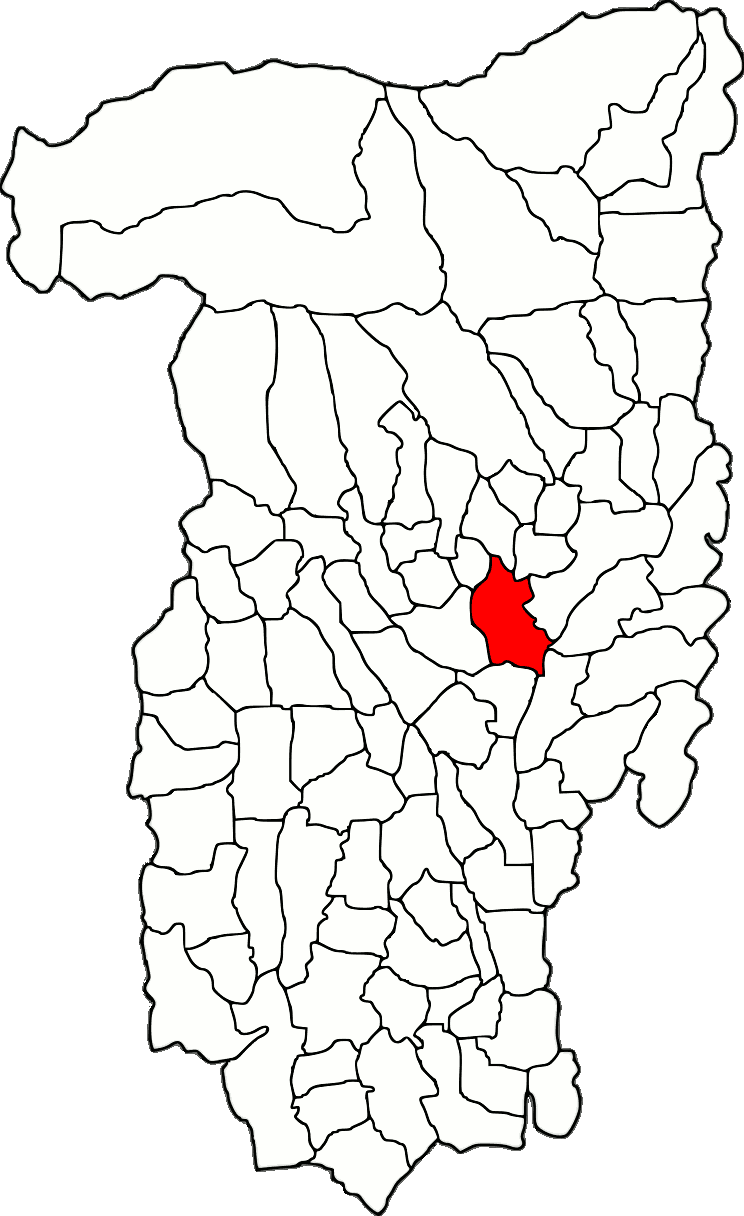
- Location in Vâlcea County

- Location in Romania
- Coordinates: 45°2′N 24°15′E
- Country: Romania
- County: Vâlcea

Government
  - Mayor (2020–2024): Constantin Bărzăgeanu (PNL)
- Area: 56 km^{2} (22 sq mi)
- Elevation: 240 m (790 ft)
- Population (2021-12-01): 6,799
  - Density: 120/km^{2} (310/sq mi)
- Time zone: UTC+02:00 (EET)
  - Summer (DST): UTC+03:00 (EEST)
- Postal code: 247378
- Area code: (+40) 02 50
- Vehicle reg.: VL
- Website: primaria-mihaesti.ro

Mihăești is a commune located in Vâlcea County, Oltenia, Romania. It is composed of thirteen villages: Arsanca, Bârsești, Buleta, Govora, Gurișoara, Măgura, Mihăești, Munteni, Negreni, Rugetu, Scărișoara, Stupărei, and Vulpuești.

== Notable people ==
- Nicolae Popa (1939–2024), judge
- Constantion Bădescu (1892–1962), brigadier-general during World War II
