= Lia Savonea =

Romanian judge (born 1969)

36th President of the High Court of Cassation and Justice
- Incumbent
- Assumed office 23 Jun 2025
- Appointed by: Nicusor Dan
- Preceded by: Corina Corbu

Member of Superior Council of the Magistracy
- In office 2017–2023

President of Superior Council of the Magistracy
- In office 2019–2019

President of Bucharest Court of Appeals
- In office 2013–2023

Personal details
- Born: Lia Fier Știop; July 26, 1969 Abrud, Socialist Republic of Romania
- Spouse: Mihai Savonea
- Education: University of Bucharest
- Occupation: Judge, Magistrate

Lia Savonea (née Fier Știop) is a Romanian judge and jurist who serves as president of the High Court of Cassation and Justice, as well as a member of the Superior Council of Magistracy (Consiliul Superior al Magistraturii, CSM). Savonea is a prominent figure in Romania's judicial system and has been the subject of significant public debate and controversy regarding judicial independence and governance.

Controversies

In April 2026, an investigation by "Cum a scăpat Lia Savonea un interlop de închisoare". RISE Project. 23 April 2026. in collaboration with the Organized Crime and Corruption Reporting Project (OCCRP) reported on a 2013 case involving Lia Savonea, President of the High Court of Cassation and Justice of Romania.

According to the investigation, Savonea presided over an appellate panel that overturned the conviction of Sorin Raiciu, who had previously been sentenced to seven years’ imprisonment for a 2008 robbery. The report stated that, at the time of the trial and appeal, Savonea and her husband co-owned real estate with a relative of the defendant, with the co-ownership lasting from 2006 to 2018.

The investigation also reported alleged irregularities in court documentation, noting that two differing versions of the acquittal decision existed in official records. Former magistrates cited in the report, including Cristi Danileț, stated that such discrepancies were highly unusual and raised questions regarding judicial procedure.

Raiciu was later charged in a separate case in 2020 involving attempted murder, in which he and several associates were accused of carrying out a violent attack.

Savonea denied the allegations, stating that she had acted in accordance with the law and rejecting any suggestion of conflict of interest. Romania’s Superior Council of Magistracy defended her, describing public criticism as an attack on judicial independence.

The investigation contributed to public debate regarding the judiciary in Romania. Savonea’s appointment as head of the High Court in 2025 had previously prompted protests, with critics expressing concerns about corruption and accountability within the judicial system.

== Early life and education ==
Lia Savonea pursued legal studies in Romania and entered the judiciary following graduation in 1997, advancing through the ranks of the court system. She has held several senior judicial positions during her career, serving as President of the Bucharest Court of Appeal before being elected as a member of the Superior Council of Magistracy. Savonea became President of the High Court of Cassation and Justice in 2023, Romania's highest court.

== Controversies ==
In 2025, Savonea was prominently featured in the investigative documentary Captured Justice (Justiție capturată), produced by the Romanian website Recorder. The documentary alleges the existence of systemic practices within the judiciary that allow high-profile defendants to evade criminal accountability through procedural delays, case reassignment, and the expiration of statutes of limitation. Savonea is cited as one of the judicial leaders alleged to have played a role in enabling or overseeing such practices.

The documentary triggered widespread public debate and protests across Romania, with demonstrators calling for judicial reform and increased accountability within the judiciary. Critics have accused Savonea of contributing to the concentration of power within the judicial system and undermining public trust in justice. Further, both protesters and some magistrates have demanded Lia Savonea's resignation from the magistracy. The Superior Council of Magistracy responded by condemning what it described as coordinated efforts to undermine confidence in the justice system. Meanwhile, Nicusor Dan, the president of Romania has made public that he shares worries on the proper functioning of the justice system.

Savonea has rejected these allegations, stating that the claims presented in the documentary are misleading and constitute an attack on the independence of the judiciary. She has argued that criticism directed at judicial leadership represents an attempt to politicize justice and weaken institutional authority.

Former judge Cristi Danileț publicly called for Savonea's resignation following a ruling by the European Court of Human Rights which found that disciplinary sanctions imposed against him in 2019 violated his right to freedom of expression. Danileț and others have argued that the case illustrates broader issues related to judicial governance under Savonea's leadership.
