= Laura-Iuliana Scântei =

Romanian politician (born 1976)

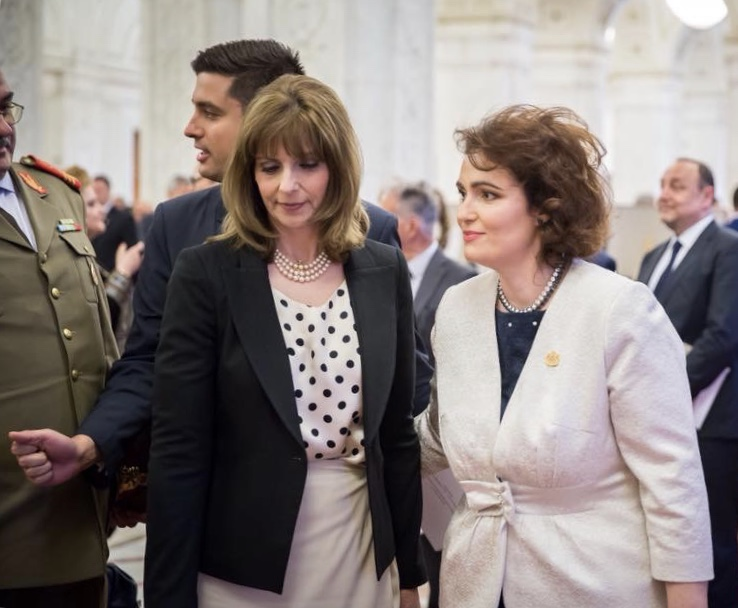
- Scântei with Princess Maria

Judge of the Constitutional Court of Romania
- Incumbent
- Assumed office 10 June 2022
- Preceded by: Mona Pivniceru

Senator
- In office 20 December 2016 – 10 June 2022

Personal details
- Born: 1 July 1976 (age 50) Șorogari, Iași, Romania
- Party: National Liberal Party

Laura-Iuliana Scântei (born 1 July 1976) is a Romanian jurist who has been a judge of the Constitutional Court of Romania since June 2022. She was previously a member of the Senate of Romania.

== See also ==
- List of members of the Senate of Romania (2016–2020)
