= List of members of the Senate of Romania (2016–2020) =

This is a list of members of the Senate of Romania, elected following the 2016 Romanian legislative election.

Senator	Party	Constituency
Alexandru Pereș	PNL	Alba
Valer-Daniel Breaz	PSD	Alba
Cristina Ioan	PNL	Arad
Mihai-Viorel Fifor	PSD	Arad
Adrian Wiener	USR	Arad
Popa Ioan	PNL	Argeș
Șerban-Constantin Valeca	PSD	Argeș
Gheorghe Marin	PSD	Argeș
Cristina Mariana Stocheci	PSD	Argeș
Viorel Ilie	ALDE	Bacău
Daniel Fenechiu	PNL	Bacău
Adrian-Dragoș Benea	PSD	Bacău
Miron-Alexandru Smarandache	PSD	Bacău
Cornel Popa	PNL	Bihor
Florian-Dorel Bodog	PSD	Bihor
Cseke Attila	UDMR	Bihor
Derzsi Ákos	UDMR	Bihor
Simionca Ioan	ALDE	Bistrița-Năsăud
Ioan Deneș	PSD	Bistrița-Năsăud
Costel Șoptică	PNL	Botoșani
Doina-Elena Federovici	PSD	Botoșani
Lucian Trufin	PSD	Botoșani
Mihai Ruse	ALDE	Brăila
Ion Rotaru	PSD	Brăila
Zamfir Daniel Cătălin	PNL	Brașov
Marius-Alexandru Dunca	PSD	Brașov
Ovidiu-Florin Orțan	PSD	Brașov
Allen Coliban	USR	Brașov
Călin Popescu Tăriceanu	ALDE	Bucharest
Traian Băsescu	PMP	Bucharest
Leon Dănăilă	PNL	Bucharest
Florin Câțu	PNL	Bucharest
Ecaterina Andronescu	PSD	Bucharest
Șerban Nicolae	PSD	Bucharest
Robert Cazanciuc	PSD	Bucharest
Mihnea-Cosmin Costoiu	PSD	Bucharest
Ioan Vulpescu	PSD	Bucharest
Vlad Alexandrescu	USR	Bucharest
Cristian Ghica	USR	Bucharest
Florina Raluca Presadă	USR	Bucharest
Silvia Monica Dinică	USR	Bucharest
Dorin-Valeriu Bădulescu	PMP	Buzău
Lucian Romașcanu	PSD	Buzău
Liliana Sbîrnea	PSD	Buzău
Filipescu Răducu George	PNL	Călărași
Pațurcă Roxana-Natalia	PSD	Călărași
Vela Ionel Marcel	PNL	Caraș-Severin
Ioan Narcis Chisăliță	PSD	Caraș-Severin
Nicoară Marius Petre	PNL	Cluj
Vasile Ilea	PSD	Cluj
László Attila	UDMR	Cluj
Remus Mihai Goțiu	USR	Cluj
Vergil Chițac	PNL	Constanța
Tit-Liviu Brăiloiu	PSD	Constanța
Nicolae Moga	PSD	Constanța
Ștefan Mihu	PSD	Constanța
Nicoleta-Ramona Dinu	USR	Constanța
Gheorghe Baciu	PMP	Covasna
Fejér László-Ödön	UDMR	Covasna
Caracota Iancu	PNL	Dâmbovița
Adrian Țuțuianu	PSD	Dâmbovița
Titus Corlățean	PSD	Dâmbovița
Viorel Riceard Badea	PNL	Diaspora
Radu Mihail	USR	Diaspora
Oprea Mario Ovidiu	PNL	Dolj
Iulian Claudiu Manda	PSD	Dolj
Radu Cosmin Preda	PSD	Dolj
Elena Lavinia Craioveanu	PSD	Dolj
Stângă George Cătălin	PNL	Galați
Ionel-Daniel Butunoi	PSD	Galați
Nicolae Marin	PSD	Galați
George-Edward Dircă	USR	Galați
Niculae Bădălău	PSD	Giurgiu
Ovidiu Cristian Dan Marciu	PSD	Giurgiu
Iriza Scarlat	ALDE	Gorj
Florin Cârciumaru	PSD	Gorj
Verestóy Attila	UDMR	Harghita
Tánczos Barna	UDMR	Harghita
Gabi Ionașcu	PMP	Hunedoara
Eleonora Carmen Hărău	PNL	Hunedoara
Cornel-Cristian Resmeriță	PSD	Hunedoara
Viorel Salan	PSD	Hunedoara
Marian Pavel	PSD	Hunedoara
Laura-Iuliana Scântei	PNL	Iași
Doru Adrian Pănescu	PSD	Iași
Victorel Lupu	PSD	Iași
Vasile Toma	PSD	Iași
Dan Lungu	USR	Iași
Nicoleta Pauliuc	PNL	Ilfov
Emanuel-Gabriel Botnariu	PSD	Ilfov
Severica Rodica Covaciu	PMP	Maramureș
Sorina Pintea	PSD	Maramureș
Sibinescu Ionut	ALDE	Mehedinți
Liviu-Lucian Mazilu	PSD	Mehedinți
Chirteș Ioan Cristian	PNL	Mureș
Aurel-Horea Soporan	PSD	Mureș
Novák Csaba-Zoltán	UDMR	Mureș
Császár Károly Zsolt	UDMR	Mureș
Nazare Eugen Țapu	PNL	Neamț
Emilia Arcan	PSD	Neamț
Dan Manoliu	PSD	Neamț
Mirea Siminica	PNL	Olt
Paul Stănescu	PSD	Olt
Renică Diaconescu	PSD	Olt
Teodor Meleșcanu	ALDE	Prahova
Dumitrescu Iulian	PNL	Prahova
Emanoil Savin	PSD	Prahova
Ștefan-Radu Oprea	PSD	Prahova
George Nicolae Marussi	USR	Prahova
Vasile Cristian Lungu	PMP	Sălaj
Gheorghe Pop	PSD	Sălaj
Gabriel-Beniamin Leș	PSD	Satu Mare
Turos Lóránd	UDMR	Satu Mare
Mircea Cazan	PNL	Sibiu
Viorel Arcaș	PSD	Sibiu
Nicolae Avram	PSD	Sibiu
Niță Ilie	ALDE	Suceava
Cadariu Constantin Daniel	PNL	Suceava
Ioan Stan	PSD	Suceava
Virginel Iordache	PSD	Suceava
Pîrvulescu Eugen	PNL	Teleorman
Carmen Daniela Dan	PSD	Teleorman
Alina Gorghiu	PNL	Timiș
Eugen Dogariu	PSD	Timiș
Adrian-Nicolae Diaconu	PSD	Timiș
Nicu Fălcoi	USR	Timiș
Ion Ganea	PMP	Tulcea
Eugen-Orlando Teodorovici	PSD	Tulcea
Romulus Bulacu	PNL	Vâlcea
Bogdan Constantin Matei	PSD	Vâlcea
Ion Hadârcă	ALDE	Vaslui
Gabriela Crețu	PSD	Vaslui
Doina Silistru	PSD	Vaslui
Toma Cătălin Dumitru	PNL	Vrancea
Cristian-Sorin Dumitrescu	PSD	Vrancea
