= Gib Mihăescu =

Romanian writer (1894–1935)

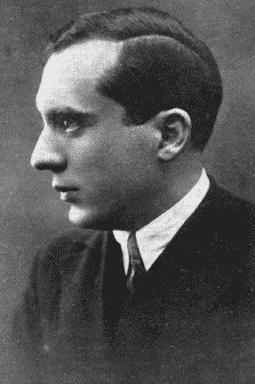
- Born: April 23, 1894; Drăgășani
- Died: October 19, 1935 (aged 41); Bucharest
- Occupations: novelist and dramatist
- Writing career
- Genres: novel, drama

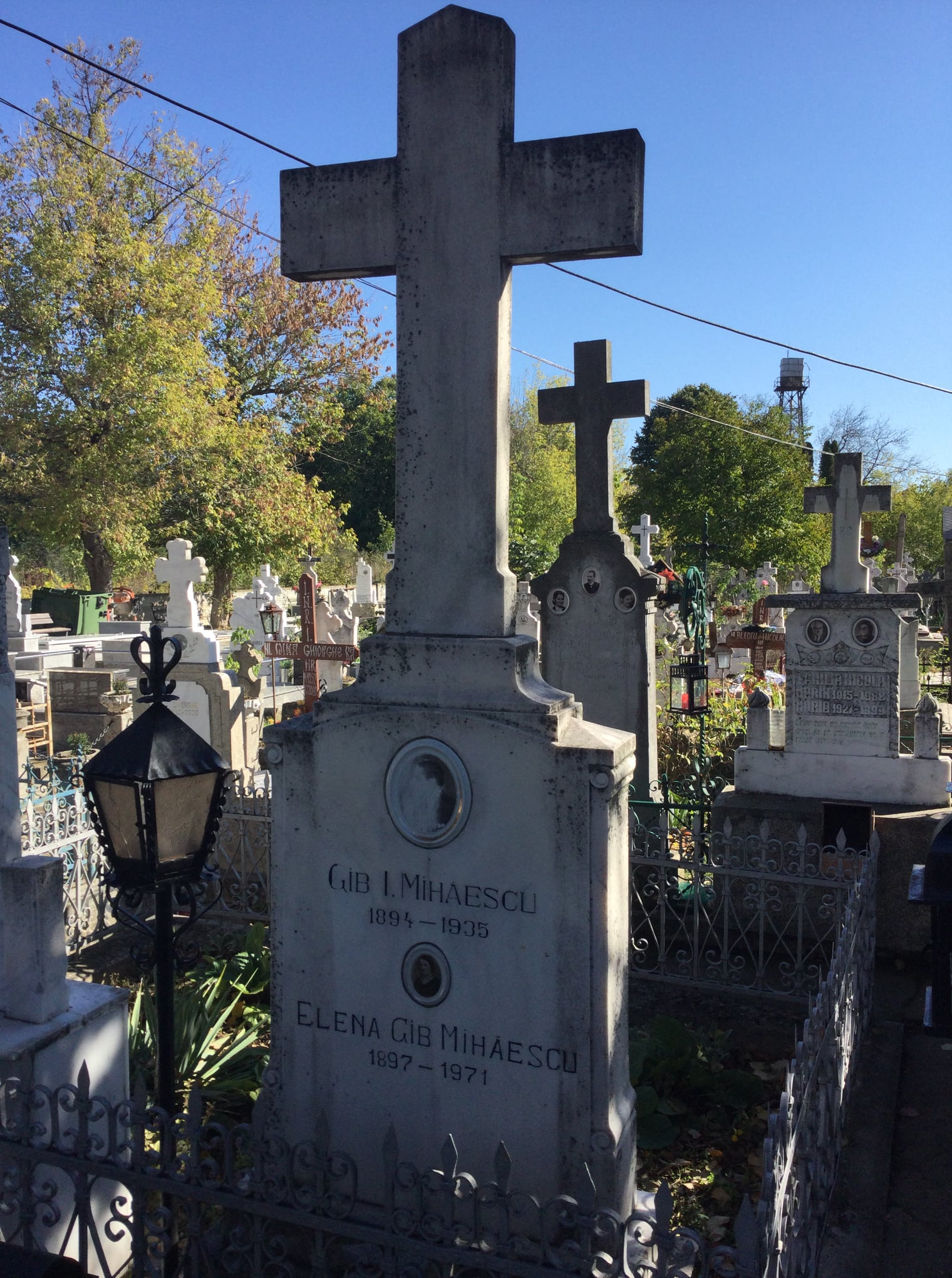
Grave in Drăgășani

Gib I. Mihăescu (Romanian pronunciation: [ˈd͡ʒib mihəˈesku]; born Gheorghe I. Mihăescu; April 23, 1894 – October 19, 1935) was a Romanian prose writer and playwright.

Born in Drăgășani, his parents were Ion Mihăescu-Stegaru, a lawyer, and his wife Ioana (née Ceaușescu). He attended primary school in his native town from 1901 to 1905, followed by high school in Craiova (1905-1906), in Slatina (1906-1907), and Râmnicu Vâlcea (1908-1909). He returned to school in Craiova in 1909, finally graduating from Carol I National College in 1914. Mihăescu's lack of interest in learning, along with the grief provoked by the illness and death of a brother in 1907, account for his mediocre performance and the many years he spent before finishing. In 1914, he entered the law faculty of the University of Bucharest at his father's insistence. He left in 1916 when Romania entered World War I; in any case, Mihăescu had not passed any exams during two years of study. Mobilized in autumn 1916, he attended an officers’ school in Botoșani for three months. He saw action at the Battle of Mărășești and in the Muscel area, and was decorated.

Demobilized in 1918, Mihăescu spent a year at Drăgășani, restoring his health. His first published work was the short story “Linia întâi”, which appeared in Luceafărul in 1919. Readmitted to the law faculty, which had expelled him, he passed his first exam in 1920, six years after starting. In 1919, he became an editor at Țara nouă newspaper. He resigned in 1920, when he left for Cluj, recently incorporated into Greater Romania. There, together with Cezar Petrescu and Adrian Maniu, he founded Gândirea magazine. He returned to Bucharest in 1922 and took his law degree the following year. He quit newspaper work and practiced law, including for a short time at Chișinău. Afterwards, he taught civics and labor law at a Drăgășani apprentices’ school from 1926 to 1929.

Mihăescu's first published book was a short story collection, La „Grandiflora” (1928), followed by Vedenia (1929). His contributions appeared in Viața literară, 'Hiena, Vremea, Boabe de grâu, Voința, Adevărul literar și artistic, Viața Românească, Flacăra, Sburătorul and Gândirea. His 1928 play Pavilionul cu umbre achieved a resounding success at the National Theatre Bucharest, with Maria Ventura in the lead role. His novels were Brațul Andromedei (1930), Rusoaica (1933), Femeia de ciocolată (1933), Zilele și nopțile unui student întârziat (1934) and Donna Alba (1935). He settled in Bucharest in 1930; with the help of friends, he was hired at the Press and Information Bureau of the Foreign Ministry. Suffering from tuberculosis, he checked into the Martin Luther Hospital in Sibiu in 1935. He was then sent to Bucharest, where he died the same year.
