= Parquet national financier =

French judicial institution

The National Financial Prosecutor (French: Parquet national financier; PNF) is a French judicial institution proposed in late 2013 and established on 1 March 2014 that is responsible for investigating serious economic and financial crimes. Since its founding, the National Financial Prosecutor's office has dealt with highly complex cases for which it has jurisdiction throughout France. The first chief prosecutor was Éliane Houlette (2014–19), and since 2019, the office has been headed by Jean-François Bohnert.

== Notable cases ==
- 2017 – From 2017 to 2021, the PNF conducted a preliminary probe against former Prime Minister François Fillon for embezzlement and concealment, alleging he used public funds to pay an assistant who helped him write a book that was published in 2015.
- 2020 – From 2013 to 2020, Airbus was investigated for corruption resulting in a major settlement with an extension following in 2022.
- 2022 – In November 2022, PNF opened a preliminary investigation into the organisation of the 2023 Rugby World Cup, which would look into whether there had been any corruption or favouritism regarding it.
