= Ion Irimescu =

Romanian sculptor (1903–2005)

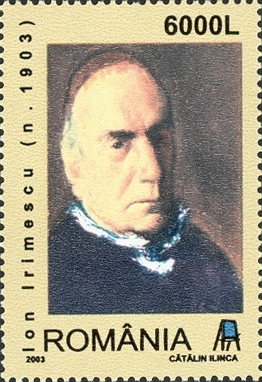
- Ion Irimescu on a Romanian stamp from 2003
- Born: 27 February 1903; Fălticeni, Kingdom of Romania
- Died: 28 October 2005 (aged 102); Fălticeni, Romania
- Education: Dimitrie Paciurea, Joseph Bernard
- Known for: Sculpting, Sketching
- Notable work: George Enescu - portrait
- Movement: Modernism

Ion Irimescu (27 February 1903 – 28 October 2005) was a Romanian sculptor and sketcher. From 1992, he was an honorary member of the Romanian Academy. In 2001 he was awarded the Prize of Excellence for Romanian Culture. He is often referred to as the "patriarch of Romanian art and sculpture".

== Biography ==
He was born in Fălticeni, the son of Petre Irimescu and Maria Cazaban, and had two brothers: Alexandru and Verona. After the graduating from Primary School No. 1 in Fălticeni in 1915, he followed the secondary course at Nicu Gane High School from the same city (1915–1924), where he took part in the theatre, creating the decorations. Between 1924 and 1928, he was a student at Bucharest National University of Arts, where his instructors included Dimitrie Paciurea and Oscar Han. While a student, he painted the Saints Archangels Michael and Gabriel Church from Oprișeni, Fălticeni. In 1928, after the graduation of Bucharest National University of Arts, he was named Arts teacher at Ștefan cel Mare Normal School, Fălticeni. In 1933 he married Eugenia Augustina Melidon, a teacher. He became an Arts teacher at the Pașcani Secondary School (1933). In 1936, he was named Arts teacher at the C.F.R. Aurel Vlaicu College, Bucharest until 1939, when he became Arts and Calligraphy teacher at Radu Greceanu Boys College from Slatina.

== Works, exhibitions, collections, museums ==
In 1928, at the graduation of the academy, he made his debut at the Bucharest Painting and Sculpture Exhibition, where he displayed his work "Eden". In 1929, he participated at the Official Salon of Painting and Sculpture, where he exhibited his works "Nud de fată", and at the French Artists' Salon. In 1930, he went to Paris after receiving a scholarship from the Fontaney-Aux-Roses Romanian School and he enrolled in Académie de la Grande Chaumière, where he worked under the guidance of the teacher Joseph Bernard, being especially influenced by the sculptures of Antoine Bourdelle. In 1932, he received an Honorary Mention of the French Artists' Society for the work "Autoportret", exhibited at the Spring Salon in Paris. At the Autumn Salon in Paris from the same year he participated with the work "Portret de fată". Irimescu returned to Romania in 1933, and thenceforth he participated in numerous organised exhibitions inside and outside the country. In 1940, he was named as teacher at Belle Arte Academy in Iași, and in 1950 at Cluj, and from 1966 he was a sculpture teacher at the Nicolae Grigorescu Plastic Arts Institute, Bucharest.

In 1942, he participated at Moldavian Official Salon, Iaşi, where he was awarded with the Culture and Arts Ministry prize. In the same year, 1942, he took part in the Romanian Arts Exhibition, part of the biennial events taking place in Venice, with the work "Cap în stil florentin".In 1956, he participated in the Venice biennial events, where he exhibited in the Romanian Pavilion 15 works and, in 1961, he exhibited at the Contemporary Sculpture Exhibition, organised next to Rodin Museum, Paris. He also exhibited his works at Bern, Helsinki, Budapest, Dresden, Moscow, Warsaw, Prague, Paris, Stockholm, London, Rome, Berlin, Bonn, Istanbul, Ankara, Tel Aviv, Damascus, Cairo, and Alexandria. In 1971, he was awarded the Order of the Star of the Romanian Socialist Republic, 2nd class. In 1975, he donated an impressive number of sculptures and drawings to the Fălticeni Museum, with which it created the "Ion Irimescu" Collection. He was named as the president Romanian Plastic Artists' Union in 1978, where he activated until 1989.

On 27 February 2003, the Romanian Academy celebrated him on the occasion of his 100th birthday.

At the end of his life he retreated to Fălticeni, where he took care of the museum that contained half of his works. Irimescu donated his works (approximately 300 sculptures and 1,000 drawings) and, as a result, it was created the biggest permanent collection of an author from Romania. One of his works, the statue of Dimitrie Cantemir, was at Biblioteca Ambrosiana in Milan, between the statues of Dante and Shakespeare.

Ion Irimescu said that, during one meeting with Nicolae Ceaușescu, he expressed his intention to sculpt a life-size bronze statue of Mihail Sadoveanu, but he did't have enough material to finish his work. To his astonishment, Ceaușescu sent him as a gift a statue of Joseph Stalin. Under these circumstances, the statue of Stalin shaped by Dumitru Demu was transformed in the statue of Sadoveanu, designed carefully by Irimescu.

On 28 October 2005, Irimescu died and was buried in Oprișeni Cemetery.
