= Ion Predescu =

Romanian politician (1927–2020)

Ion Predescu (2 October 1927 – 12 October 2020) was a Romanian politician and judge who served as a Social Democratic Senator, Minister of Justice, and member of the Constitutional Court of Romania.

Predescu was born in Optași-Măgura, Olt County. He studied at the Radu Greceanu High School in Slatina and received his law degree from the University of Bucharest. He started practicing law in 1952, and taught at the Law Schools of the University of Craiova and Spiru Haret University in Bucharest. In May 1990 he was elected to the Senate and in 1991 he participated in the drafting of the Constitution of Romania. He served as Minister of Justice from 3 to 12 December 1996 in the Văcăroiu Cabinet. He was awarded the Order of the Star of Romania, Knight rank and the National Order of Faithful Service. He died in Craiova in 2020.
