= Pan M. Vizirescu =

Romanian poet and essayist

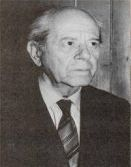
Pan M. Vizirescu, Romanian writer

Pantelimon M. Vizirescu (August 16, 1903–January 27, 2000) was a Romanian poet and essayist.

== Biography ==
=== Early life and education ===
Born in Braneț, Olt County, his parents Marin Vizirescu and Maria (née Pietreanu) were agricultural laborers, while his brother Sm. M. Vizirescu became a writer. He began primary school in his native village, completing it in Slatina. He began secondary studies at Craiova's D. A. Sturdza military high school. He later went to Radu Greceanu High School in Slatina and to Carol I National College in Craiova, from which he graduated in 1925. Later that year, he entered the literature and philosophy faculty of the University of Bucharest, graduating in 1929. In 1938, Vizirescu obtained a doctorate from the same institution; the adviser on his thesis, which dealt with characteristic national poetry, was Constantin Rădulescu-Motru.

=== Early teaching and journalism career ===
Between 1930 and 1937, he taught at Ștefan cel Mare military high school in Cernăuți, as well as other high schools in the same city. From 1937 to 1939, he taught at Carol I High School in Bucharest. From 1939, he headed Curierul Serviciului Social, the press organ for the Dimitrie Gusti-founded Social Service. In 1940, he became an editor in the press section of the Propaganda Ministry. Later the same year, he became cabinet director in the same ministry, serving until 1944. In 1940, he directed Muncitorul român magazine, the official publication of the Labor Ministry.

=== 1945 conviction ===
In 1945, after a Romanian Communist Party-dominated government came to power, he was sentenced to hard labor for life. However, he did not serve time, instead remaining in hiding until 1967.

=== 1995 sentence overturning and later life ===
On 8 May 1995, after the fall of Communism, 10 of the sentences pronounced during the Post-World War II Romanian war crime trials were overturned by the Supreme Court of Justice. They were part of the 14 war criminals convicted in the "Journalists' trial" of 1945. Only one of the ten, Vizirescu himself, was in attendance when the proceedings took place. He was a cabinet director within the Propaganda Ministry. From 1940 to 23 August 1944, he was deputy director of the radio-journal of the Romanian Radio Broadcasting Company. Regarding his conviction, Vizirescu stated: "Knowing that this Court [the People's Court] was a terrorist organization and that the judges were mere terrorist agents, I chose not to go. I had this conscience of the truth, because they had no right to judge us - it should have been the other way around. I am now satisfied of being declared innocent and I will face God in all peace, for I was not guilty.". Attorney General Vasile Manea Drăgulin presented the convictions decided upon in 1945 as illegal, believing the interpretation of the evidence to have been “retroactive, truncated, and tendentious”, therefore amounting to a “conviction decision, whose content is a synthesis of vehement criticism of their activity, to which we forcefully ascribed the character of war crimes”.

Vizirescu died in Slatina.

== Publications ==
Vizirescu's contributions appeared in Facla, Secolul (Craiova), Bilete de Papagal, Revista Fundațiilor Regale, Țara noastră, Viața literară, Familia, Gândirea, Universul, Curentul and Porunca vremii. His first published work, the sketch "Sfârșit duios", ran in Universul literar in 1922 and was signed with the pen name Dela Bârsa. His first book was Poezia noastră religioasă (1943). He published volumes of poetry (Poeme, 1982; Sunet peste culmi, 1985; Călătorie de taină, 1988; Mi se oprise timpul, 1995; Prins de lumină și har, 1995; Tărâmul însingurării mele, 2002; Orizonturi lirice, 2003; Armonii, 2003), essays (Coloane care cresc necontenit, 1999) and theater (Liga oamenilor cinstiți, 1997). He sometimes used the pen name Nicolae Ancuța Rădoi.
