= Daniel Morar =

Romanian jurist (born 1966)

Daniel Marius Morar (born August 15, 1966) is a Romanian jurist, who was Chief Prosecutor of the Romanian National Anti-corruption Directorate (DNA), the agency responsible for investigating, preventing and prosecuting corruption-related offenses. The National Anti-corruption Directorate under Morara's leadership is credited as one of the pivotal actors in Romania's anti-corruption fight. Since 2013 he has been a supreme judge on Romania's Constitutional Court.

== Biography ==
Since September 2001, he has indicted nine deputies, three Secretaries of State and former Prime Minister Adrian Năstase.

As Chief of the National Anti-corruption Directorate, he started re-opening files that had been previously closed by the former DNA management. The Năstase case was one of those. Morara's policy is to work on all the "shadow zones" that led the European Commission to label the fight against the corruption as one of the conditions Romania had to fulfill in order to accede to the European Union. While important steps have been made in this direction, the clearance of the old corruption and bribery involved personnel is compulsory.
