= Tudorel Toader =

Romanian lawyer and professor

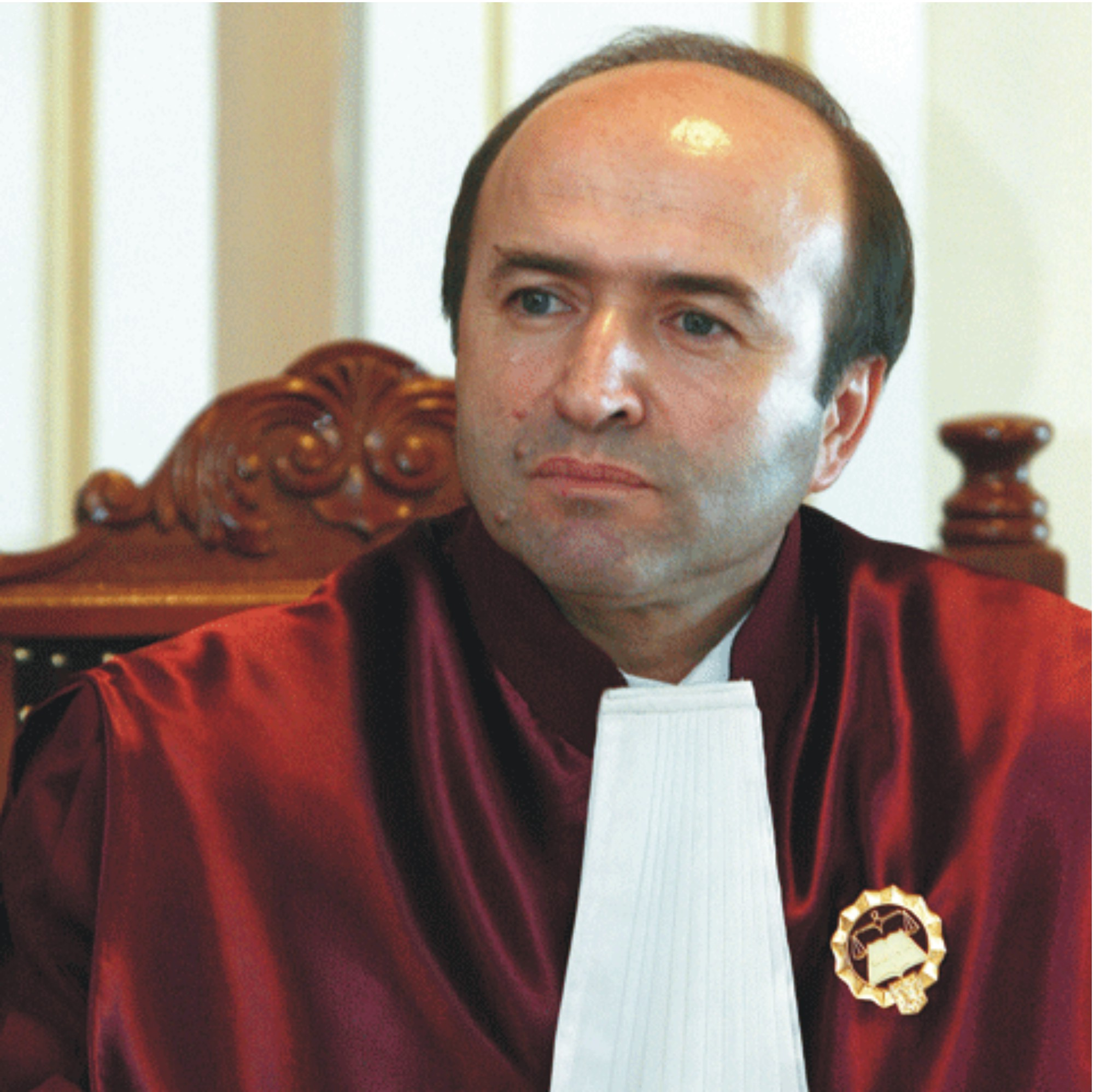
Tudorel Toader

Tudorel Toader (born 25 March 1960, in Vulturu, Vrancea County, Socialist Republic of Romania) is a Romanian lawyer and professor.

Between 1982 and 1986, Toader studied at The Law University at "Al.I. Cuza" Iași. In 2006 he was appointed judge at the Constitutional Court of Romania by the Chamber of Deputies for a year and re-appointed in 2007 to serve in that capacity until 2016. Toader was Minister of Justice in the Grindeanu Cabinet, Tudose Cabinet, and Dăncilă Cabinet from 23 February 2017 to 24 April 2019. His son Alexandru Ionut Toader, a law professor at the same University of Iasi, was accused by the prosecutors in October 2026 of raping several of his students and placed under arrest. Toader stated that these allegations were fabricated to get to him.

== Education and formation ==
- Unirea High School of Focșani, Vrancea County;
- Faculty of Law, Alexandru Ioan Cuza University of Iași, between 1982 and 1986;
- The National Defence College within the National Defence University "Carol I", in 2004.

== Qualification awarded ==
- Bachelor's degree in Law
- PhD in Law, Criminal Procedure Law

== Academic ==
- University assistant, 1990–1993;
- University lecturer, 1993–1998;
- University reader, 1998–2002;
- University professor, since 2003 onwards.

== Career ==
=== Judicial practice ===
- Public prosecutor within the Panciu Prosecutor's Office; Vrancea County, 1986–1990;
- Lawyer in the Iaşi Bar Association, from 1991 until September 2006;
- Judge of the Constitutional Court of Romania, since 2006 onwards.

=== Ministry of Justice ===
He was invested for the first time as Minister of Justice in February 2017. In 2018, he started the procedure which led to the dismissal of Laura Codruța Kövesi, the chief anti-corruption prosecutor of the National Anticorruption Directorate (DNA).

== Tenured professor teaching the following courses ==
- Criminology, 1993–1996;
- Criminal Law. Special Part, since 1994;
- Offences regulated by special laws, since 1999;
- European Criminal Law, since 2000.
