= Jean-François Bohnert =

French magistrate

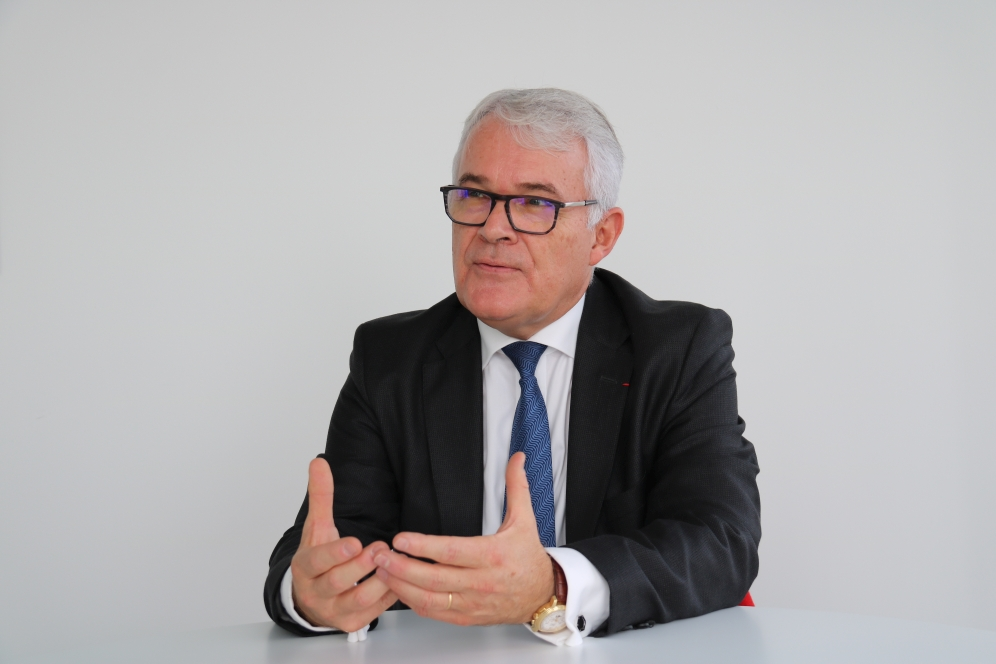
Jean-François Bohnert

Jean-François Bohnert is a French magistrate. He was appointed as director of the Parquet national financier on 7 October 2019.

== Awards and honors ==
He was appointed Knight of the Legion of Honor by decree on 30 December 2017.
