= Constitutional Court of Romania =

Institution in Romania

- Curtea Constituțională a României
- Established: 1992
- Location: Palace of the Parliament, Bucharest
- Composition method: Senate selection (3 members); Chamber of Deputies selection (3 members); President selection (3 members)
- Authorised by: Constitution
- Appeals from: 1992 – 2003: Parliament; 2003 – present: none
- Judge term length: 9 years
- Number of positions: 9
- Website: http://www.ccr.ro/

President of the Constitutional Court of Romania
- Currently: Elena-Simina Tănăsescu
- Since: 2025
- Lead position ends: 2028

The Constitutional Court of Romania (Romanian: Curtea Constituțională a României) is the institution which rules on whether the laws, decrees or other bills enacted by Romanian authorities are in conformity with the Constitution.

It consists of nine members serving nine-year terms which cannot be extended, with three members each appointed by the President, the Senate and the Chamber of Deputies. Three members are renewed every 3 years.

== Powers ==
According to the Article 146 of the Constitution, the Constitutional Court exercises the following powers:

- to adjudicate on the constitutionality of laws, before promulgation, upon notification by the President of Romania, by the President of either Chamber of Parliament, by the Government, the Supreme Court of Justice, by a number of at least 50 Deputies or at least 25 Senators, as well as, ex officio, on initiatives to revise the Constitution
- to adjudicate on the constitutionality of the Standing Orders of Parliament, upon notification by the President of either Chamber, by a parliamentary group or a number of at least 50 Deputies or at least 25 Senators
- to decide on exceptions brought to the Courts of law as to the unconstitutionality of laws and orders
- to guard the observance of the procedure for the election of the President of Romania and to confirm the ballot returns
- to ascertain the circumstances which justify the interim in the exercise of office of President of Romania, and to report its findings to Parliament and the Government
- to give advisory opinion on the proposal to suspend the President of Romania from office
- to guard the observance of the procedure for the organization and holding of a referendum, and to confirm its returns
- to check on compliance with the conditions for the exercise of the legislative initiative by citizens
- to decide on objections of unconstitutionality of a political party
- to carry out also other duties stipulated by the organic law of the Court.

== Related events ==
- 5 October 2024 – The Constitutional Court notably disqualified S.O.S. Romania candidate Diana Șoșoacă from running in the 2024 Romanian presidential election, ruling claiming that her public statements and conduct "systematically" violate the country's constitutional foundation of membership in Euro-Atlantic structures, without giving any specific reasons to backup their claim. The court's ruling, which was split 5–2 along party lines, was criticized by some for being politically motivated, undemocratic and a result of corruption.
- 28 November 2024 – The Constitutional Court ordered the November 24 presidential election to recount its votes.
- 2 December – 2024 Romanian presidential election: The Constitutional Court unanimously validates the results of the first round of the presidential election.
- 6 December – 2024 Romanian presidential election: The Constitutional Court annuls the results of the first round of the presidential election.
- 11 March 2025 – The Constitutional Court notably disqualifies independent candidate Călin Georgescu from running in the postponed 2025 Romanian presidential election after being charged with six offenses.
- 22 May 2025 - 2025 Romanian presidential election: The Constitutional Court officially validates the results of the election, confirming Nicușor Dan as the new President of Romania.

== Members ==
=== Current structure ===
Appointer	Name (Office)	Term start	Term end
Senate	Cristian Deliorga	2019	2028
Senate	Laura-Iuliana Scântei	2022	2031
Senate	Mihai Busuioc	2025	2034
Chamber of Deputies	Gheorghe Stan	2019	2028
Chamber of Deputies	Dimitre Bogdan Licu	2022	2031
Chamber of Deputies	Csaba Asztalos	2025	2034
President	Elena Simina Tănăsescu (President)	2019 (2025)	2028 (2028)
President	Mihaela Ciochină	2022	2031
President	Dacian Dragoș	2025	2034

=== History ===
Since it was created in 1992, the Constitutional Court had the following composition.

Year	Senate appointments			Chamber of Deputies appointments			Presidential appointments			President
1992	Fazakás Miklos^{(3)}	Viorel-Mihai Ciobanu^{(6)}	Antonie Iorgovan^{(R)}	Ion Filipescu^{(3)}	Victor-Dan Zlătescu^{(6)}	Ioan Muraru	Vasile Gionea^{(3)}	Mihai Constantinescu^{(6)}	Florin Bucur Vasilescu	Vasile Gionea
1993	Fazakás Miklos^{(3)}	Viorel-Mihai Ciobanu^{(6)}	Antonie Iorgovan^{(R)}	Ion Filipescu^{(3)}	Victor-Dan Zlătescu^{(6)}	Ioan Muraru	Vasile Gionea^{(3)}	Mihai Constantinescu^{(6)}	Florin Bucur Vasilescu	Vasile Gionea
1994	Fazakás Miklos^{(3)}	Viorel-Mihai Ciobanu^{(6)}	Antonie Iorgovan^{(R)}	Ion Filipescu^{(3)}	Victor-Dan Zlătescu^{(6)}	Ioan Muraru	Vasile Gionea^{(3)}	Mihai Constantinescu^{(6)}	Florin Bucur Vasilescu	Vasile Gionea
1995	Fazakás Miklos^{(3)}	Viorel-Mihai Ciobanu^{(6)}	Antonie Iorgovan^{(R)}	Ion Filipescu^{(3)}	Victor-Dan Zlătescu^{(6)}	Ioan Muraru	Vasile Gionea^{(3)}	Mihai Constantinescu^{(6)}	Florin Bucur Vasilescu	Vasile Gionea
1995	Costică Bulai	Viorel-Mihai Ciobanu^{(6)}	Antonie Iorgovan^{(R)}	Lucian Stângu	Victor-Dan Zlătescu^{(6)}	Ioan Muraru	Ioan Deleanu^{(R)}	Mihai Constantinescu^{(6)}	Florin Bucur Vasilescu	Ioan Muraru
1996	Costică Bulai	Viorel-Mihai Ciobanu^{(6)}	Antonie Iorgovan^{(R)}	Lucian Stângu	Victor-Dan Zlătescu^{(6)}	Ioan Muraru	Ioan Deleanu^{(R)}	Mihai Constantinescu^{(6)}	Florin Bucur Vasilescu	Ioan Muraru
1996	Costică Bulai	Viorel-Mihai Ciobanu^{(6)}	Romul Petru Vonica^{(r)}	Lucian Stângu	Victor-Dan Zlătescu^{(6)}	Ioan Muraru	Nicolae Popa^{(r)}	Mihai Constantinescu^{(6)}	Florin Bucur Vasilescu	Ioan Muraru
1997	Costică Bulai	Viorel-Mihai Ciobanu^{(6)}	Romul Petru Vonica^{(r)}	Lucian Stângu	Victor-Dan Zlătescu^{(6)}	Ioan Muraru	Nicolae Popa^{(r)}	Mihai Constantinescu^{(6)}	Florin Bucur Vasilescu	Ioan Muraru
1998	Costică Bulai	Viorel-Mihai Ciobanu^{(6)}	Romul Petru Vonica^{(r)}	Lucian Stângu	Victor-Dan Zlătescu^{(6)}	Ioan Muraru	Nicolae Popa^{(r)}	Mihai Constantinescu^{(6)}	Florin Bucur Vasilescu	Ioan Muraru
1998	Costică Bulai	Kozsokár Gábor	Romul Petru Vonica^{(r)}	Lucian Stângu	Constantin Doldur	Ioan Muraru	Nicolae Popa^{(r)}	Lucian Mihai^{(R)}	Florin Bucur Vasilescu	Lucian Mihai
1999	Costică Bulai	Kozsokár Gábor	Romul Petru Vonica^{(r)}	Lucian Stângu	Constantin Doldur	Ioan Muraru	Nicolae Popa^{(r)}	Lucian Mihai^{(R)}	Florin Bucur Vasilescu	Lucian Mihai
2000	Costică Bulai	Kozsokár Gábor	Romul Petru Vonica^{(r)}	Lucian Stângu	Constantin Doldur	Ioan Muraru	Nicolae Popa^{(r)}	Lucian Mihai^{(R)}	Florin Bucur Vasilescu	Lucian Mihai
2001	Costică Bulai	Kozsokár Gábor	Romul Petru Vonica^{(r)}	Lucian Stângu	Constantin Doldur	Ioan Muraru	Nicolae Popa^{(r)}		Florin Bucur Vasilescu	
2001	Costică Bulai	Kozsokár Gábor	Nicolae Cochinescu	Lucian Stângu	Constantin Doldur	Ioan Vida	Nicolae Popa^{(r)}	Şerban Viorel Stănoiu^{(r)}	Petre Ninosu^{(d)}	Nicolae Popa
2002	Costică Bulai	Kozsokár Gábor	Nicolae Cochinescu	Lucian Stângu	Constantin Doldur	Ioan Vida	Nicolae Popa^{(r)}	Şerban Viorel Stănoiu^{(r)}	Petre Ninosu^{(d)}	Nicolae Popa
2003	Costică Bulai	Kozsokár Gábor	Nicolae Cochinescu	Lucian Stângu	Constantin Doldur	Ioan Vida	Nicolae Popa^{(r)}	Şerban Viorel Stănoiu^{(r)}	Petre Ninosu^{(d)}	Nicolae Popa
2004	Costică Bulai	Kozsokár Gábor	Nicolae Cochinescu	Lucian Stângu	Constantin Doldur	Ioan Vida	Nicolae Popa^{(r)}	Şerban Viorel Stănoiu^{(r)}	Petre Ninosu^{(d)}	Nicolae Popa
2004	Ion Predescu	Kozsokár Gábor	Nicolae Cochinescu	Aspazia Cojocaru	Constantin Doldur	Ioan Vida	Acsinte Gaspar	Şerban Viorel Stănoiu^{(r)}	Petre Ninosu^{(d)}	Ioan Vida
2005	Ion Predescu	Kozsokár Gábor	Nicolae Cochinescu	Aspazia Cojocaru	Constantin Doldur	Ioan Vida	Acsinte Gaspar	Şerban Viorel Stănoiu^{(r)}	Petre Ninosu^{(d)}	Ioan Vida
2006	Ion Predescu	Kozsokár Gábor	Nicolae Cochinescu	Aspazia Cojocaru	Constantin Doldur	Ioan Vida	Acsinte Gaspar	Şerban Viorel Stănoiu^{(r)}	Petre Ninosu^{(d)}	Ioan Vida
2006	Ion Predescu	Kozsokár Gábor	Nicolae Cochinescu	Aspazia Cojocaru	Tudorel Toader^{(r)}	Ioan Vida	Acsinte Gaspar	Şerban Viorel Stănoiu^{(r)}	Petre Ninosu^{(d)}	Ioan Vida
2007	Ion Predescu	Kozsokár Gábor	Nicolae Cochinescu	Aspazia Cojocaru	Tudorel Toader^{(r)}	Ioan Vida	Acsinte Gaspar	Şerban Viorel Stănoiu^{(r)}	Petre Ninosu^{(d)}	Ioan Vida
2007	Ion Predescu	Puskás Valentin-Zoltán	Nicolae Cochinescu	Aspazia Cojocaru	Tudorel Toader^{(f)}	Ioan Vida	Acsinte Gaspar	Augustin Zegrean	Petre Ninosu^{(d)}	Ioan Vida
2008	Ion Predescu	Puskás Valentin-Zoltán	Nicolae Cochinescu	Aspazia Cojocaru	Tudorel Toader^{(f)}	Ioan Vida	Acsinte Gaspar	Augustin Zegrean	Petre Ninosu^{(d)}	Ioan Vida
2008	Ion Predescu	Puskás Valentin-Zoltán	Nicolae Cochinescu	Aspazia Cojocaru	Tudorel Toader^{(f)}	Ioan Vida	Acsinte Gaspar	Augustin Zegrean	Petre Lăzăroiu^{(r)}	Ioan Vida
2009	Ion Predescu	Puskás Valentin-Zoltán	Nicolae Cochinescu	Aspazia Cojocaru	Tudorel Toader^{(f)}	Ioan Vida	Acsinte Gaspar	Augustin Zegrean	Petre Lăzăroiu^{(r)}	Ioan Vida
2010	Ion Predescu	Puskás Valentin-Zoltán	Nicolae Cochinescu	Aspazia Cojocaru	Tudorel Toader^{(f)}	Ioan Vida	Acsinte Gaspar	Augustin Zegrean	Petre Lăzăroiu^{(r)}	Ioan Vida
2010	Ion Predescu	Puskás Valentin-Zoltán	Iulia Motoc^{(R)}	Aspazia Cojocaru	Tudorel Toader^{(f)}	Mircea-Ștefan Minea	Acsinte Gaspar	Augustin Zegrean	Petre Lăzăroiu^{(f)}	Augustin Zegrean
2011	Ion Predescu	Puskás Valentin-Zoltán	Iulia Motoc^{(R)}	Aspazia Cojocaru	Tudorel Toader^{(f)}	Mircea-Ștefan Minea	Acsinte Gaspar	Augustin Zegrean	Petre Lăzăroiu^{(f)}	Augustin Zegrean
2012	Ion Predescu	Puskás Valentin-Zoltán	Iulia Motoc^{(R)}	Aspazia Cojocaru	Tudorel Toader^{(f)}	Mircea-Ștefan Minea	Acsinte Gaspar	Augustin Zegrean	Petre Lăzăroiu^{(f)}	Augustin Zegrean
2013	Ion Predescu	Puskás Valentin-Zoltán	Iulia Motoc^{(R)}	Aspazia Cojocaru	Tudorel Toader^{(f)}	Mircea-Ștefan Minea	Acsinte Gaspar	Augustin Zegrean	Petre Lăzăroiu^{(f)}	Augustin Zegrean
2013	Mona-Maria Pivniceru	Puskás Valentin-Zoltán	Toni Greblă^{(r), (R)}	Valer Dorneanu	Tudorel Toader^{(f)}	Mircea-Ștefan Minea	Daniel Morar	Augustin Zegrean	Petre Lăzăroiu^{(f)}	Augustin Zegrean
2014	Mona-Maria Pivniceru	Puskás Valentin-Zoltán	Toni Greblă^{(r), (R)}	Valer Dorneanu	Tudorel Toader^{(f)}	Mircea-Ștefan Minea	Daniel Morar	Augustin Zegrean	Petre Lăzăroiu^{(f)}	Augustin Zegrean
2015	Mona-Maria Pivniceru	Puskás Valentin-Zoltán	Toni Greblă^{(r), (R)}	Valer Dorneanu	Tudorel Toader^{(f)}	Mircea-Ștefan Minea	Daniel Morar	Augustin Zegrean	Petre Lăzăroiu^{(f)}	Augustin Zegrean
2015	Mona-Maria Pivniceru	Puskás Valentin-Zoltán	Simona-Maia Teodoroiu^{(r)}	Valer Dorneanu	Tudorel Toader^{(f)}	Mircea-Ștefan Minea	Daniel Morar	Augustin Zegrean	Petre Lăzăroiu^{(f)}	Augustin Zegrean
2016	Mona-Maria Pivniceru	Puskás Valentin-Zoltán	Simona-Maia Teodoroiu^{(r)}	Valer Dorneanu	Tudorel Toader^{(f)}	Mircea-Ștefan Minea	Daniel Morar	Augustin Zegrean	Petre Lăzăroiu^{(f)}	Augustin Zegrean
2016	Mona-Maria Pivniceru	Marian Enache	Simona-Maia Teodoroiu^{(r)}	Valer Dorneanu	Attila Varga	Mircea-Ștefan Minea	Daniel Morar	Livia Doina Stanciu	Petre Lăzăroiu^{(f)}	Valer Dorneanu
2017	Mona-Maria Pivniceru	Marian Enache	Simona-Maia Teodoroiu^{(r)}	Valer Dorneanu	Attila Varga	Mircea-Ștefan Minea	Daniel Morar	Livia Doina Stanciu	Petre Lăzăroiu^{(f)}	Valer Dorneanu
2018	Mona-Maria Pivniceru	Marian Enache	Simona-Maia Teodoroiu^{(r)}	Valer Dorneanu	Attila Varga	Mircea-Ștefan Minea	Daniel Morar	Livia Doina Stanciu	Petre Lăzăroiu^{(f)}	Valer Dorneanu
2019	Mona-Maria Pivniceru	Marian Enache	Simona-Maia Teodoroiu^{(r)}	Valer Dorneanu	Attila Varga	Mircea-Ștefan Minea	Daniel Morar	Livia Doina Stanciu	Petre Lăzăroiu^{(f)}	Valer Dorneanu
2019	Mona-Maria Pivniceru	Marian Enache	Cristian Deliorga	Valer Dorneanu	Attila Varga	Gheorghe Stan	Daniel Morar	Livia Doina Stanciu	Elena Tănăsescu	Valer Dorneanu
2020	Mona-Maria Pivniceru	Marian Enache	Cristian Deliorga	Valer Dorneanu	Attila Varga	Gheorghe Stan	Daniel Morar	Livia Doina Stanciu	Elena Tănăsescu	Valer Dorneanu
2021	Mona-Maria Pivniceru	Marian Enache	Cristian Deliorga	Valer Dorneanu	Attila Varga	Gheorghe Stan	Daniel Morar	Livia Doina Stanciu	Elena Tănăsescu	Valer Dorneanu
2022	Mona-Maria Pivniceru	Marian Enache	Cristian Deliorga	Valer Dorneanu	Attila Varga	Gheorghe Stan	Daniel Morar	Livia Doina Stanciu	Elena Tănăsescu	Valer Dorneanu
2022	Laura-Iuliana Scântei	Marian Enache	Cristian Deliorga	Bogdan Licu	Attila Varga	Gheorghe Stan	Mihaela Cochină	Livia Doina Stanciu	Elena Tănăsescu	Marian Enache
2023	Laura-Iuliana Scântei	Marian Enache	Cristian Deliorga	Bogdan Licu	Attila Varga	Gheorghe Stan	Mihaela Cochină	Livia Doina Stanciu	Elena Tănăsescu	Marian Enache
2024	Laura-Iuliana Scântei	Marian Enache	Cristian Deliorga	Bogdan Licu	Attila Varga	Gheorghe Stan	Mihaela Cochină	Livia Doina Stanciu	Elena Tănăsescu	Marian Enache
2025	Laura-Iuliana Scântei	Marian Enache	Cristian Deliorga	Bogdan Licu	Attila Varga	Gheorghe Stan	Mihaela Cochină	Livia Doina Stanciu	Elena Tănăsescu	Marian Enache
2025	Laura-Iuliana Scântei	Mihai Busuioc	Cristian Deliorga	Bogdan Licu	Csaba Asztalos	Gheorghe Stan	Mihaela Cochină	Dacian Dragoș	Elena Tănăsescu	Elena Tănăsescu
2026	Laura-Iuliana Scântei	Mihai Busuioc	Cristian Deliorga	Bogdan Licu	Csaba Asztalos	Gheorghe Stan	Mihaela Cochină	Dacian Dragoș	Elena Tănăsescu	Elena Tănăsescu

- ^{(3)} - appointed for a three year term (1992 appointments only)
- ^{(6)} - appointed for a six year term (1992 appointments only)
- ^{(R)} - resigned
- ^{(r)} - appointed for a reminder of a term
- ^{(d)} - died in office
- ^{(f)} - reappointed for a full term

== See also ==
- Judiciary of Romania
- High Court of Cassation and Justice
- Rule of law
- Rule According to Higher Law
