= Judiciary of Romania =

Justice System of Romania

The judiciary of Romania is organized as a hierarchical system of courts, with a civil law system. Provisions regarding its structure and organization are found in the Constitution and Law no. 304/2022 on judicial organization.

The civil courts are organized as follows:

- High Court of Cassation and Justice (Înalta Curte de Casaţie şi Justiţie)
- 15 Courts of Appeal (curţi de apel)
- 41 county courts and the Bucharest Municipal Court (tribunale)
- 188 Local courts (judecătorii).

Each court is run by a court president, who is responsible for its management and public relations. Within most courts there are specialized sections or panels for civil and criminal cases, as well as other areas of the law.

A number of specialized courts (tribunale specializate) also exist, such as the Argeș Commercial Court and the Braşov Family Court. The Constitutional Court of Romania acts as an independent constitutional jurisdiction and is not part of the ordinary court system.

== Courts of Appeal ==
There are 15 Courts of Appeal, located for example in Bucharest and Oradea.

== Military courts ==
The military court system is organized into three tribunals, the Territorial Military Tribunal and the Military Court of Appeal.

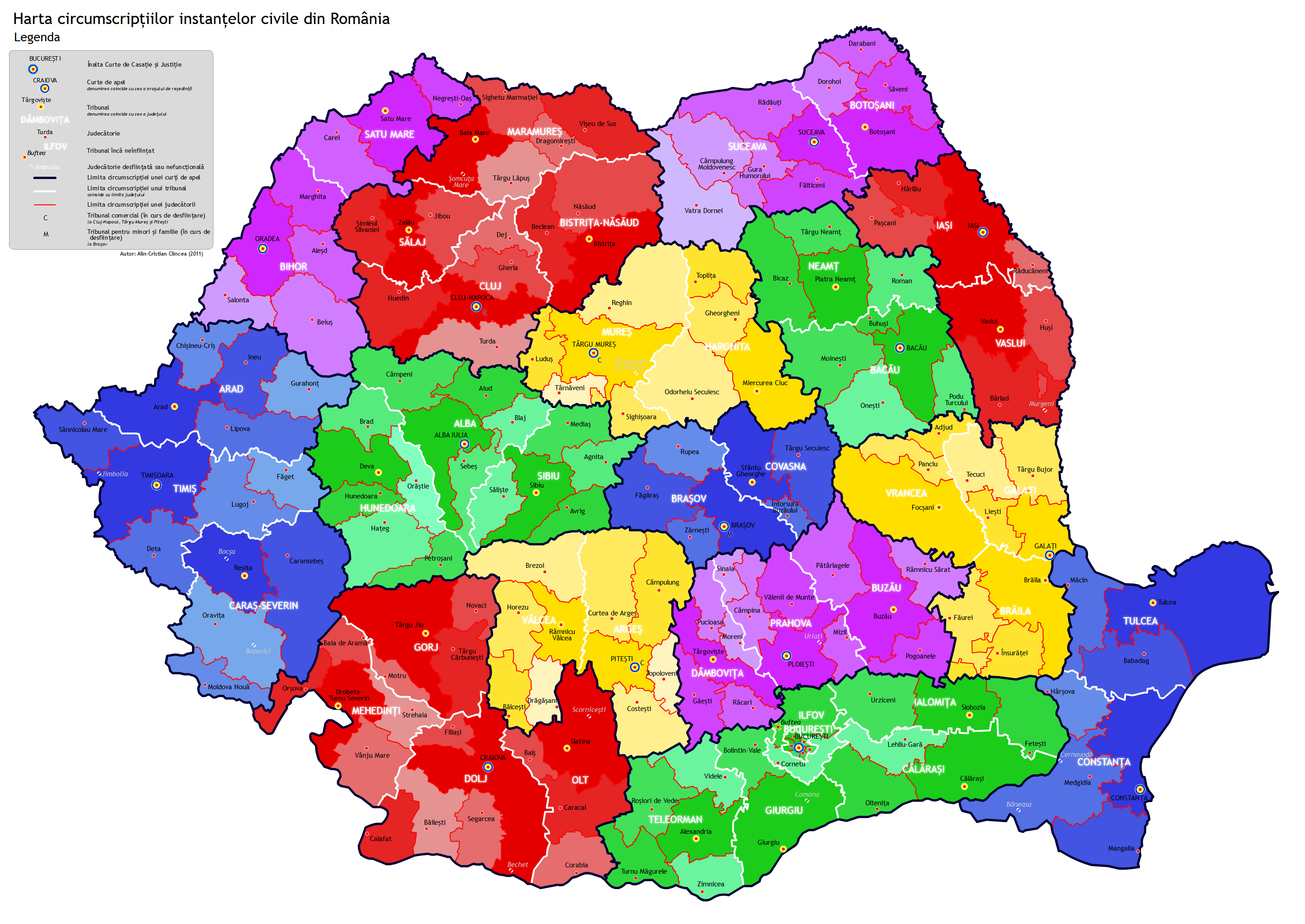
Civil jurisdictions of Romania

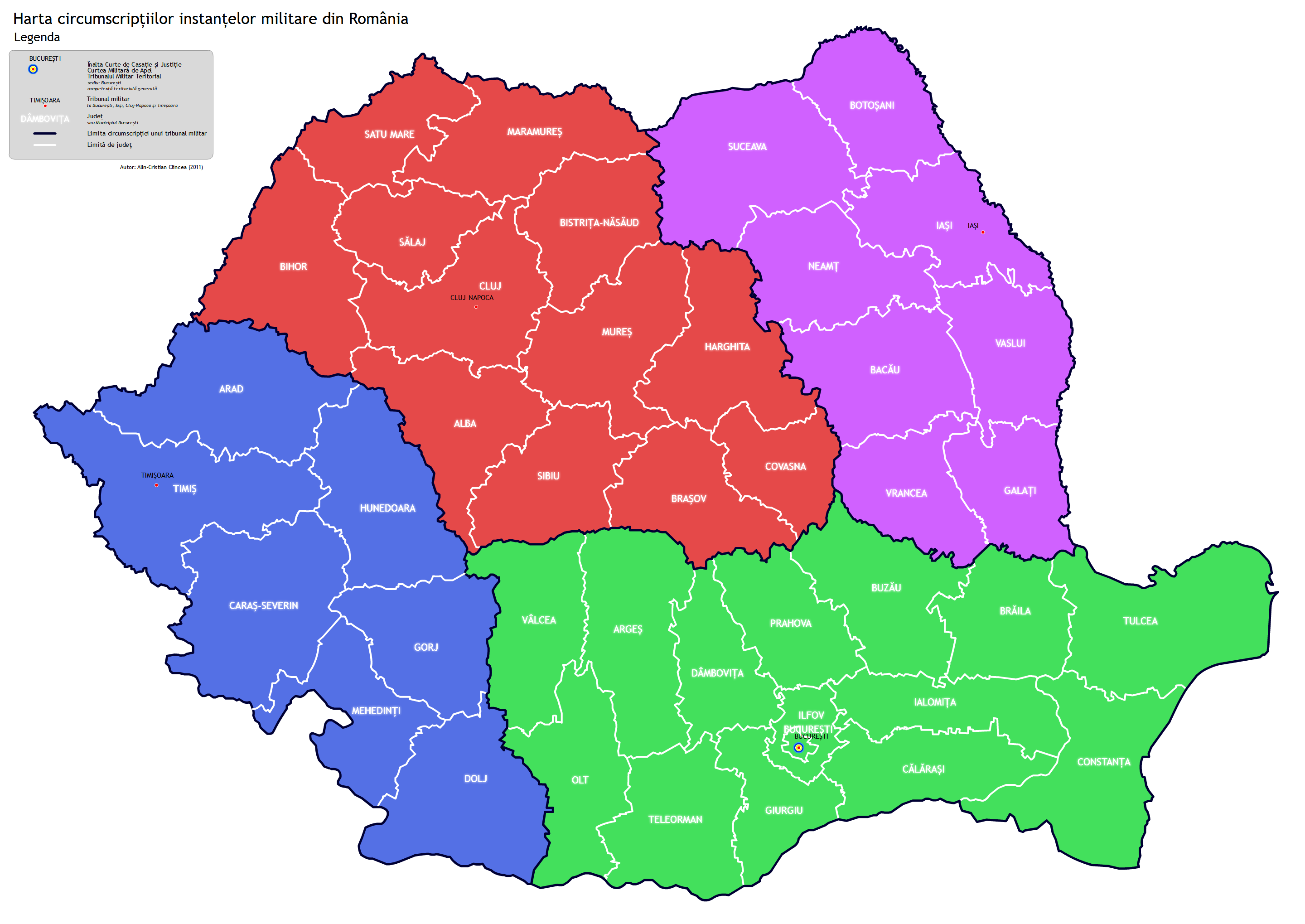
Military jurisdictions of Romania
