= High Court of Cassation and Justice =

Supreme court of Romania

- Înalta Curte de Casație și Justiție
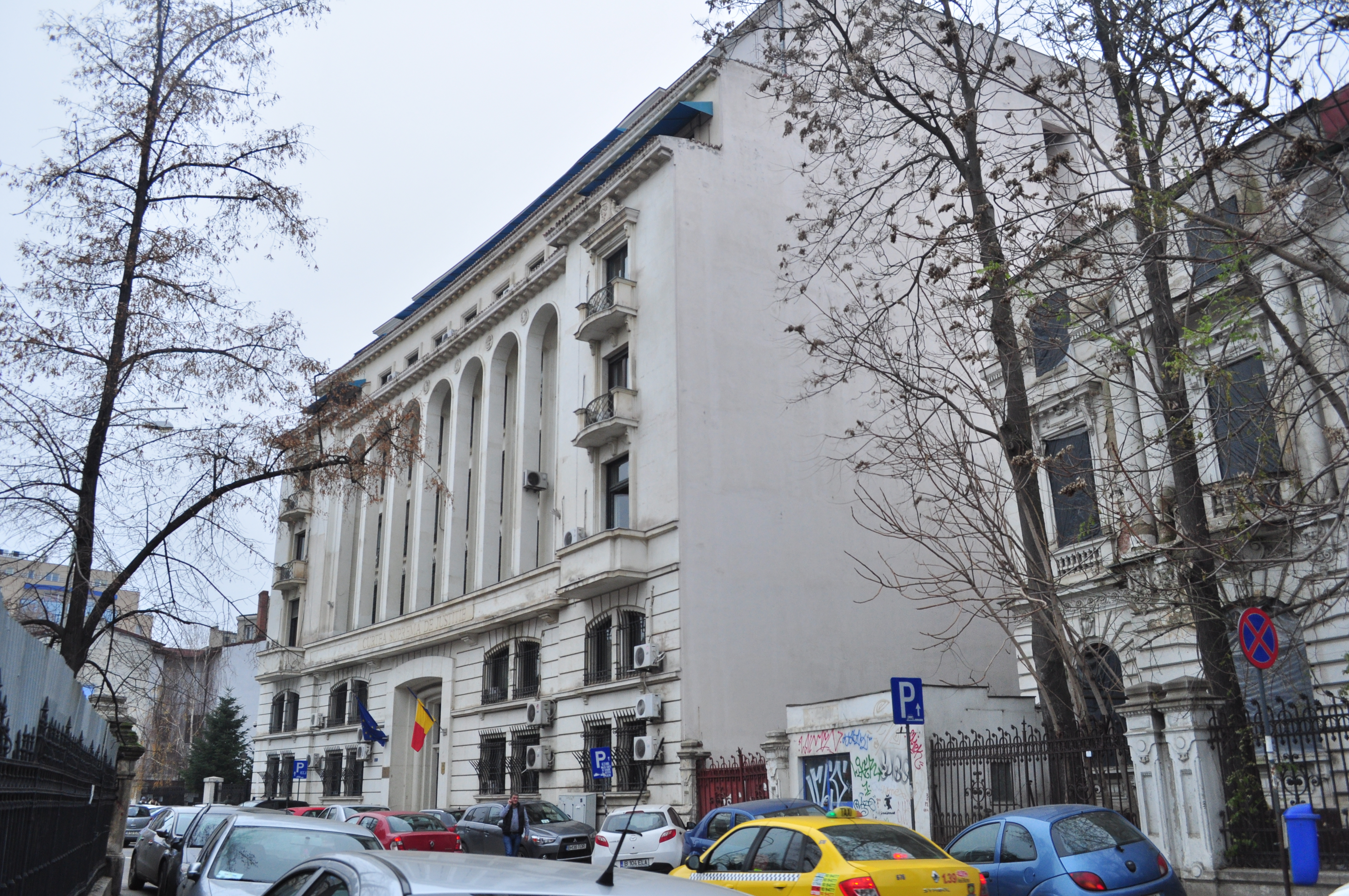
- Established: 1861
- Jurisdiction: Romania
- Location: Bucharest
- Composition method: Admission contest/Promotion
- Authorised by: Constitution
- Website: https://www.iccj.ro/

President
- Currently: Lia Savonea
- Since: 23 June 2025
- Lead position ends: 23 June 2028

The High Court of Cassation and Justice (Romanian: Înalta Curte de Casație și Justiție) is Romania's supreme court. It is the equivalent of France's Cour de Cassation and serves a similar function to other courts of cassation around the world.

== Naming history ==
It held various names during its existence: "Curtea Supremă" (Supreme Court) and "Tribunalul Suprem" (Supreme Tribunal) during the Communist period (1948–1952 and 1952–1989 respectively), and "Curtea Supremă de Justiție" (Supreme Court of Justice) from 1990 to 2003. The name "Înalta Curte de Casație și Justiție" was re-introduced in 2003, having been also used during the United Principalities (1862–1881) and Kingdom of Romania (1881–1947).

== Administration ==
The court is led by a president, seconded by a vice-president and the leading council. Since June 2025, its president is Lia Savonea. The general assembly of the court's judges assigns two members for the Superior Council of Magistrature. The same assembly approves the annual activity report (released publicly) and the budget of the institution.

According to the law, "The president, the vice-president and the section presidents of the High Court of Cassation and Justice are named by the President of Romania, at the proposal of the Superior Council of Magistrature, out of the judges of the High Court that have worked in at this instance for at least two years". The term lasts for three years, with the possibility of being renewed once.

== Controversial decisions ==
From 1995 to 2000, the Romanian Supreme Court rehabilitated a total of at least 14 convicted war criminals. These included 3 members of Ion Antonescu's wartime government (Nichifor Crainic, Toma Ghițulescu and finance minister Gheron Netta), Radu Dinulescu ("the Eichmann of Romania") and his deputy (Gheorghe Petrescu) as well as other statesmen and journalists such as former minister Stelian Popescu and Pan M. Vizirescu. A procedure known as "extraordinary appeal" was used to overturn their war crimes and "crimes against peace" convictions. In 2004, the "extraordinary appeal" procedure was eliminated from the Romanian legislation following recommendations from the European Court of Human Rights. This, however, backfired on those who wanted these rehabilitations undone, as Efraim Zuroff came to find out. When, in February 2004, Zuroff demanded that the Romanian authorities overturn the rehabilitations of Colonels Radu Dinulescu and Gheorghe Petrescu, he was informed that this was "technically impossible". Due to the abolition of "extraordinary appeal", a decision by the Supreme Court can no longer be challenged within the framework of Romanian legislation.

== List of Court Presidents ==
No.	Name	Term start	Term end
High Court of Cassation and Justice
1	Vasile Sturza	14 February 1862	19 October 1868
2	Constantin Hurmuzache	24 October 1868	8 March 1869
3	Scarlat Fălcoianu	8 March 1869	3 September 1876
4	Alexandru Creţescu	3 September 1876	15 October 1886
5	Constantin Schina	15 October 1886	1 April 1906
6	Scarlat Ferekyde	1 April 1906	1 May 1909
7	G.N. Bagdat	1 May 1909	1 October 1911
8	Corneliu Manolescu	1911	1918
9	Victor Romniceanu	1919	5 August 1924
10	Gheorghe Buzdugan	5 August 1924	5 June 1927
11	Oscar Nicolescu	5 August 1927	7 November 1930
12	Ion Stambulescu	7 November 1930	17 February 1931
13	Dimitrie Volanschi	24 March 1931	1 June 1938
14	Andrei Rădulescu	1 June 1938	September 1940
15	Dimitie Lupu	September 1940	1944
16	Oconel Cireş	1944	1945
17	Petre Davidescu	1945	1947
(16)	Oconel Cireş	1947	1948
Supreme Court
(16)	Oconel Cireş	1949	1 April 1949
18	Gheorghe Stere	1 April 1949	1 August 1952
Supreme Tribunal
18	Gheorghe Stere	1 August 1952	24 January 1953
19	Stelian Niţulescu	24 January 1953	1 July 1954
20	Alexandru Voitinovici	1 July 1954	March 1967
21	Emilian Nucescu	March 1967	August 1975
22	Constantin Stătescu	August 1975	January 1977
23	Iustin Grigoraş	January 1977	November 1979
24	Ioan Sălăjan	November 1979	27 December 1989
Supreme Court of Justice
24	Ioan Sălăjan	27 December 1989	3 January 1990
25	Teodor Vasiliu	3 January 1990	20 July 1990
26	Teofil Pop	20 July 1990	17 June 1992
27	Valeriu Bogdănescu	13 July 1992	25 July 1994
28	Gheorghe Uglean	20 December 1994	20 June 1998
29	Sorin Moisescu	20 June 1998	6 April 2000
30	Paul Florea	27 April 2000	18 October 2003
High Court of Cassation and Justice
30	Paul Florea	18 October 2003	16 June 2004
31	Nicolae Popa	14 July 2004	14 September 2009
32	Lidia Bărbulescu	14 September 2009	15 September 2010
33	Livia Doina Stanciu	17 September 2010	14 September 2016
34	Iulia-Cristina Tarcea	14 September 2016	14 September 2019
35	Corina-Alina Corbu	15 September 2019	23 june 2025
36	Lia Savonea	23 june 2025	incumbent

== See also ==
- Judiciary of Romania
- Constitutional Court of Romania
