= Ramona-Ioana Bruynseels =

Romanian politician (born 1980)

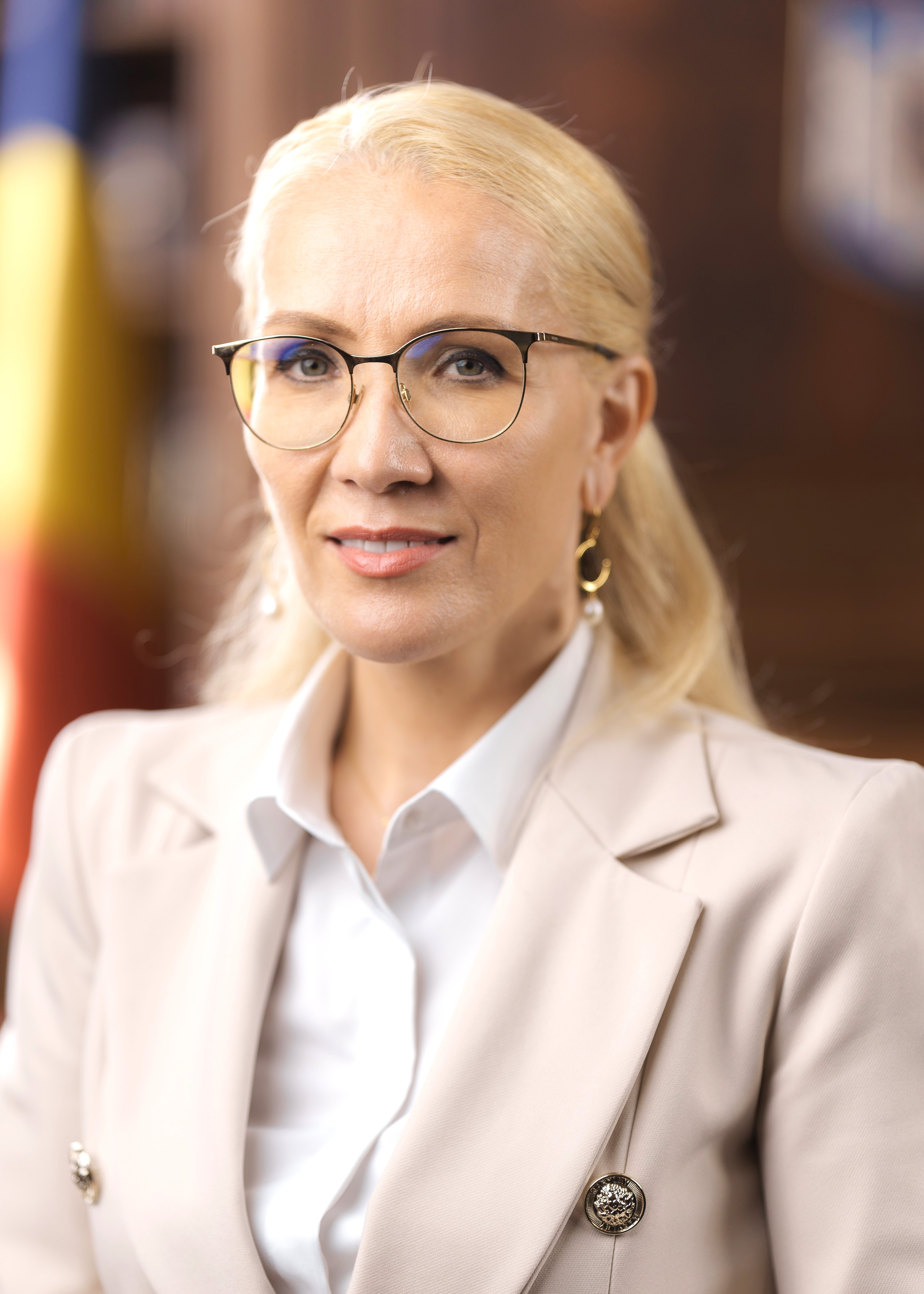
- Bruynseels in 2025

Member of the Chamber of Deputies
- Incumbent
- Assumed office 21 December 2024
- Constituency: Cluj County

Personal details
- Born: 14 February 1980 (age 46) Cluj-Napoca, Romania
- Party: Alliance for the Union of Romanians (since 2023)
- Other political affiliations: Humanist Power Party (2019–20); People's Movement Party (2020–23)
- Spouse: Dominic Bruynseels (m. 2018)
- Children: 2
- Website: ioanaramona.ro
- Ramona-Ioana Bruynseels' voice Bruynseels speaking in Bucharest; Recorded 14 March 2025

Ramona-Ioana Bruynseels (born 14 February 1980) is a Romanian jurist and politician who has served as a member of the Chamber of Deputies since 2024.

Born in Cluj-Napoca, she graduated from the Harvard Kennedy School, specialising in management in public administration. Between 2015 and 2019, she held various positions within the Romanian government, including that of secretary of state in the General Secretariat of the government.

Bruynseels ran in the 2019 presidential election for the Humanist Party, obtaining 2.7% of the vote. In 2023, she joined the Alliance for the Union of Romanians for which she was elected in the 2024 parliamentary election. As a deputy, she is secretary of the Defence Committee and serves on the Budget Committee.

== Early life and education ==
=== Family background ===
Ramona-Ioana Bruynseels was born on 14 February 1980 in Cluj-Napoca, the capital of Cluj County, in the Socialist Republic of Romania. She has roots in Hida, Sălaj County, where her mother is from. During her 2019 presidential campaign, Bruynseels stated about her upbringing:

I am Romanian, born in Cluj to Romanian parents, to peasant grandparents from Sălaj County, a person who grew up in Romania, grew up in hardships when I was a child, and I think I understand and I still remember those hardships, and that means something because you can understand what is happening now to a large part of the Romanian people

— Ramona-Ioana Bruynseels, October 2019

=== Studies ===
Bruynseels studied at the Faculty of Law of the Dimitrie Cantemir Christian University in Cluj-Napoca, after which she completed a postgraduate study programme at Carol I National Defence University in Bucharest. Before moving to the United States, she lived in Johannesburg, South Africa, volunteering for a Save the Children initiative for aid to abandoned and HIV-infected children. After her stay South Africa, Bruynseels moved to the United States in 2014 to study for a Master of Public Administration (MPA) degree at the Harvard Kennedy School, Harvard University, graduating the following year. During her studies, she was awarded the Raymond Vernon and Lucius Littauer Special Awards and briefly met then-U.S. vice president Joe Biden.

== Professional career ==
Bruynseels began her professional career in 2002, serving for a period as a civil law lecturer at the Dimitrie Cantemir Christian University and as a legal advisor at the 4th Army Corps of the Ministry of National Defence in the area. Between 2005 and 2007, she was a Head of the Community Relations Department at Banca Comercială Română (BCR), serving as an advisor to is executive president until 2011. In addition to her native Romanian, Bruynseels is fluent in English with knowledge of Spanish and Russian.

== Political career ==
=== Early political activity ===
During the government of Mihai Tudose, Bruynseels headed the Directorate for Policy and Priorities Coordination, and served from 2015 to 2016 as a communications advisor to former deputy prime minister Gabriel Oprea. Beginning in July 2017, she was a state counselor and later a state secretary within the General Secretariat of the Government, and from December 2018 a state counselor in the Personal Working Apparatus of prime minister Viorica Dăncilă until Bruynseels' resignation in May 2019. During the campaign for the failed 2018 constitutional referendum held on 6–7 October, Bruynseels campaigned in the affirmative.

=== 2019 presidential campaign ===
In June 2019, the Congress of the Humanist Power Party, founded by Romanian politician and businessman Dan Voiculescu in 2015, elected her as president of its executive board. Concurrently, the congress unanimously nominated her as the party's candidate for the 2019 presidential election in November, with her presidential campaign being officially launched on 7 July. The announcement was met with surprise and intrigue from political commentators. During the campaign, she enjoyed intensively promotion by the Voiculescu-founded Intact Media Group. Bruynseels ran on a platform based on opposition towards a "flawed political system" which was acting "to the detriment of the interests of citizens".

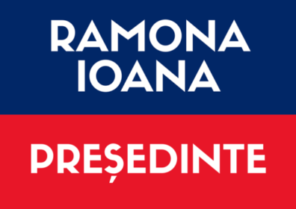
Bruynseels' 2019 campaign poster

On 3 September 2019, she expressed support for closer military cooperation between Romania and Russia, stating that bilateral military exercises should be pursued. On 20 September, she vowed that one of her first in office, she would declare a referendum on the abolishment of legal immunity for politicians. On 22 September, Bruynseels submitted her candidacy application to the Central Electoral Bureau (BEC) in Bucharest, along with over 280,000 signatures. Upon leaving the BEC's premises, her campaign team released several white doves as a symbol of "a new chance for Romania". The BEC validated her candidacy two days later. In October, she spoke up against domestic violence against women. Her campaign did not receive public funding, raising 800,000 Romanian lei (equivalent to approximately 185,000 USD in 2025) from private donors.

In the first round of the election on 10 November, Bruynseels received 2.6 per cent of the vote, finishing in seventh place. Bruynseels stated in her concession speech on election night that the country had not yet been "ready for a young president", declaring to her supporters, "Four months ago I was an unknown, today several hundred thousand Romanians have put their trust in me. I am not stopping politics, I have many projects". Bruynseels obtained her highest vote share in Hunedoara County with 4.4 per cent, and her lowest in Harghita County with 0.7 per cent. Following the first round, Bruynseels endorse neither of the two remaining candidates, incumbent president Klaus Iohannis and Viorica Dăncilă, for the runoff on 24 November, recommending her supporters to boycott the second round.

In August 2020, Bruynseels joined the People's Movement Party (PMP). In January 2022, Bruynseels sent an open letter to the economy minister, Florin Spătaru, criticising the government of Nicolae Ciucă for increasing bureaucracy.

=== Alliance for the Union of Romanians (2023–present) ===
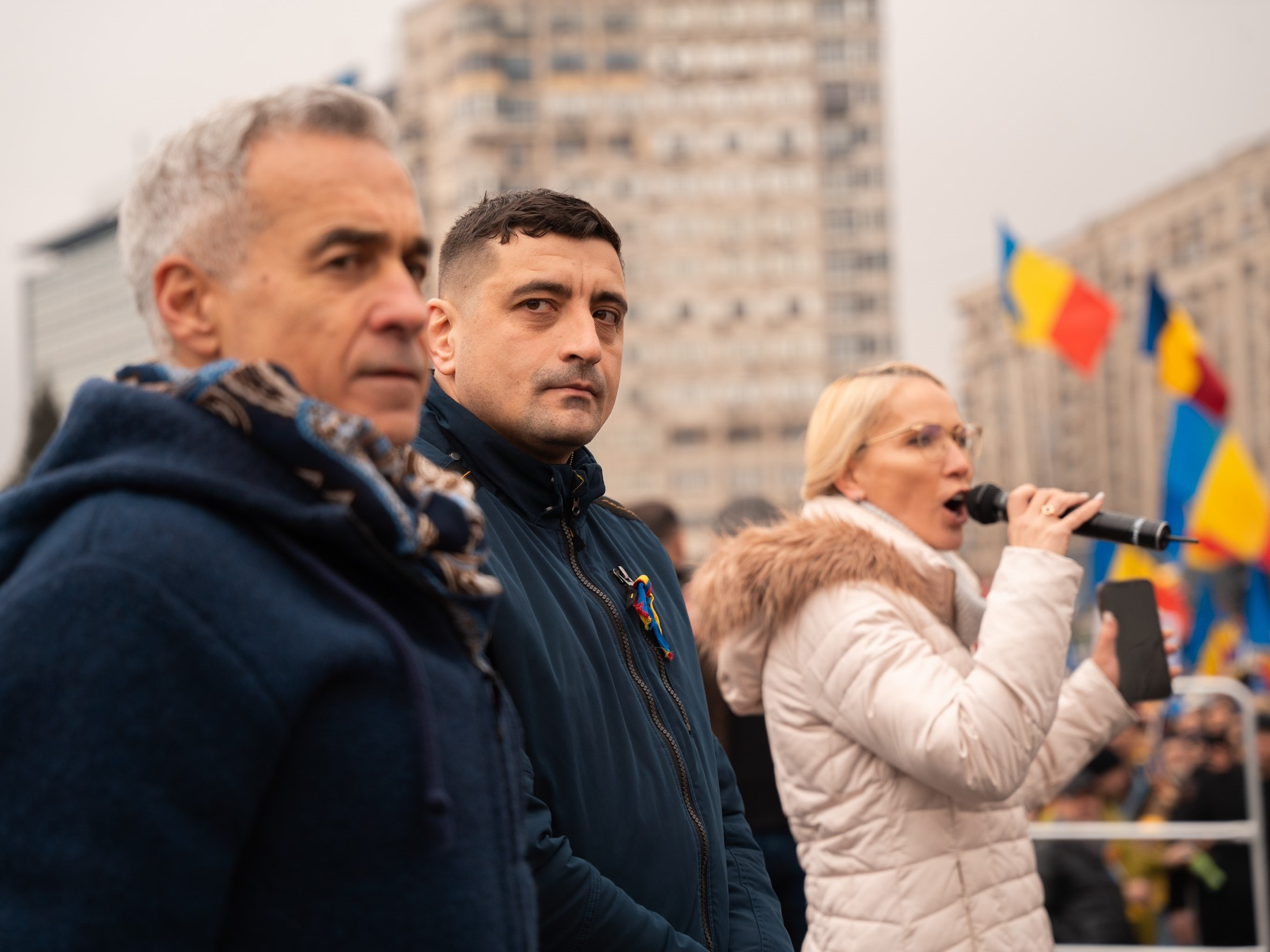
Bruynseels with Călin Georgescu (left) and George Simion at a protest in Bucharest, 1 March 2025

On 29 January 2023, Bruynseels announced that she had joined the Alliance for the Union of Romanians (AUR) party led by George Simion. In the 2024 local elections on 9 June, she ran as an AUR candidate in Bucharest's Sector 1, receiving 7.2 per cent of the vote and George Tuță winning the mayorship of the sector.

Following the first round of the 2024 presidential election on 24 November, Bruynseels endorsed Călin Georgescu for president against Elena Lasconi, while also stating that she did not have "absolute compatibility" with him. However, the Constitutional Court annulled the result on 6 December due to alleged Russian interference, with Nicușor Dan ultimately winning the 2025 presidential election in May of that year.

In the 2024 parliamentary election on 1 December, Bruynseels was elected a member of the Chamber of Deputies for the AUR in Cluj County, taking office on 21 December. As deputy, she serves on the Committee on Budget, Finance and Banks as well as being the secretary of the Committee on Defence, Public Order and National Security. Bruynseels has since 3 February 2025 served as the vice leader of the AUR parliamentary group with Mihai Enache as leader. She is a member of the Romanian parliamentary delegation to the North Atlantic Treaty Organisation (NATO).

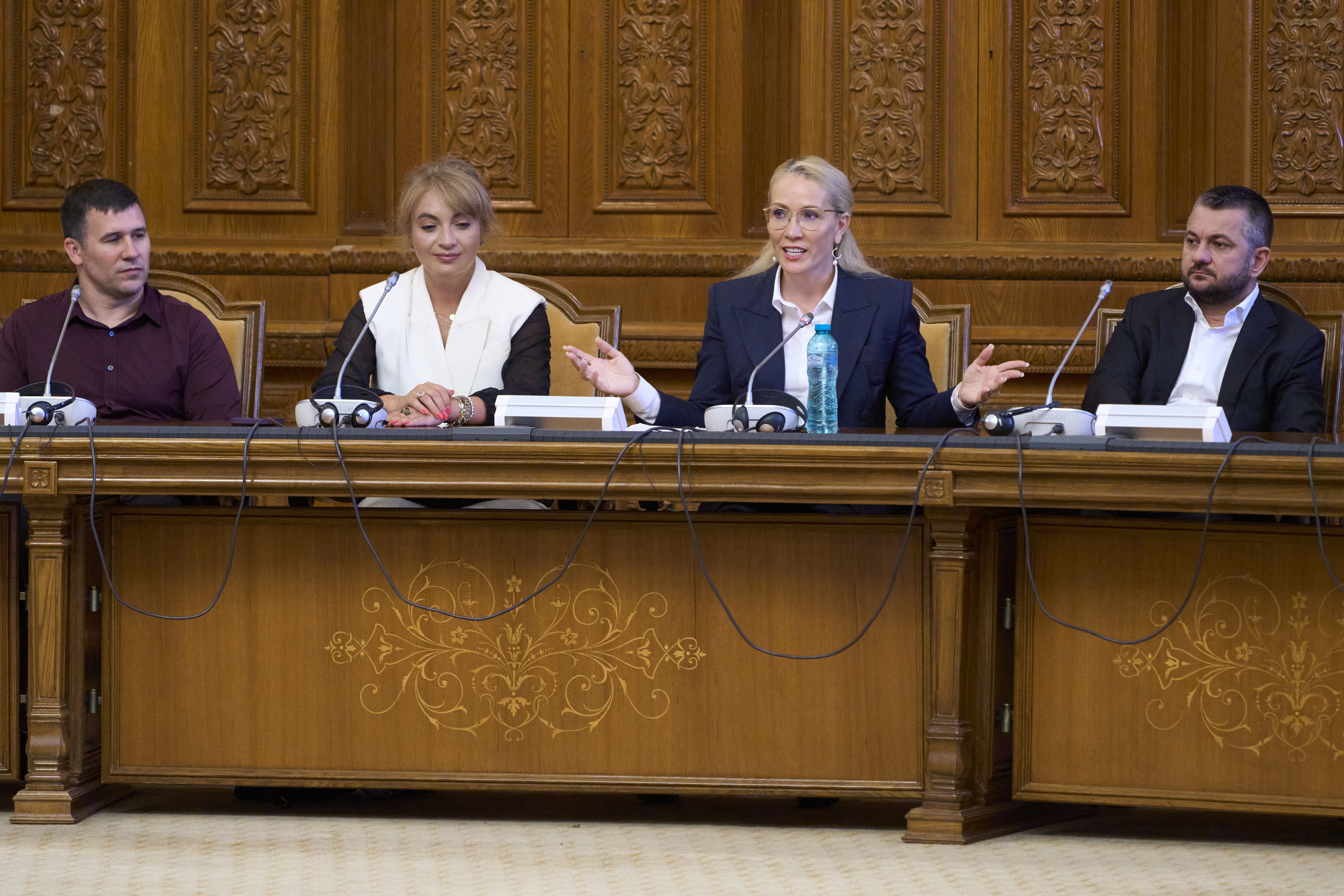
Bruynseels with Silvia Uscov in the Romanian Parliament, 20 June 2025

In July 2025, Bruynseels denounced the financial measures announced by prime minister Ilie Bolojan and his government for being damaging for pensioners and other vulnerable groups. On AUR's motion of no confidence against the government that same month, Bruynseels on a press conference "It is a motion against a government whose fiscal measures will lead to disaster. We are on the edge of the abyss". As of August 2025, Bruynseels has spoken 18 times, put forth 10 legislative initiatives, three draft decisions, 24 questions and interpellations as well as four motions.

== Personal life ==
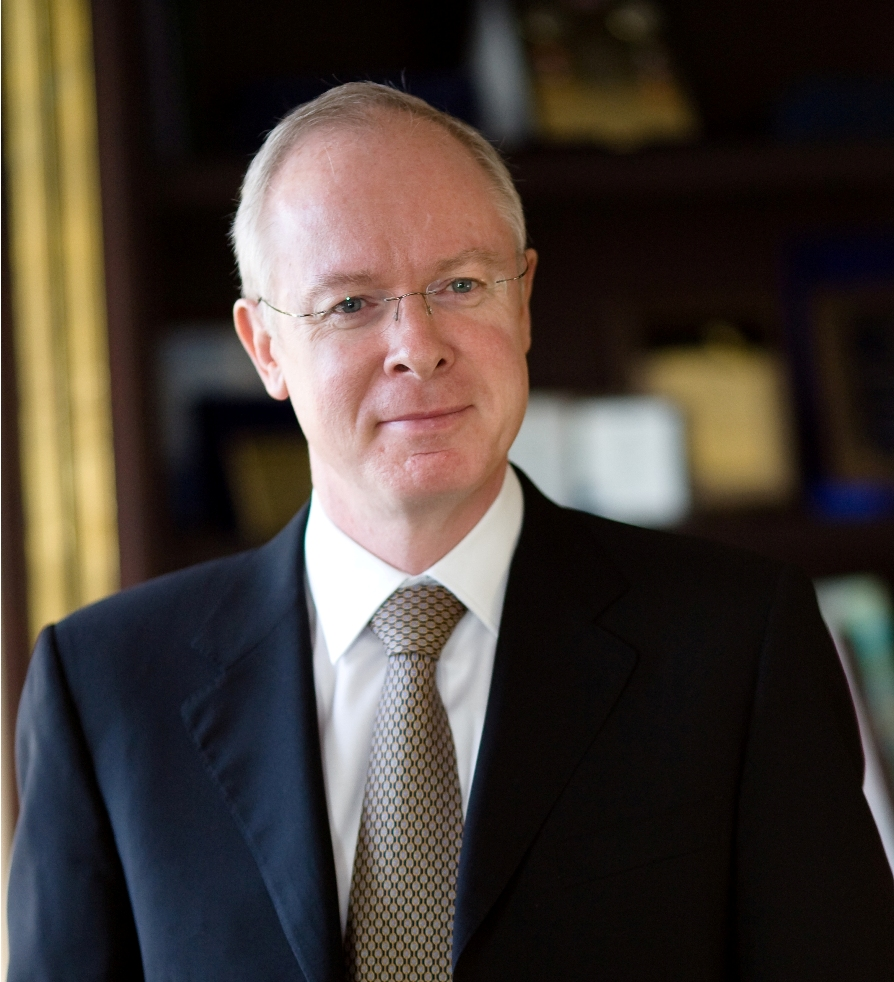
Dominic Bruynseels pictured in December 2008

Bruynseels married lawyer Ioan Viorel Lohan in 2008 with whom she separated in 2010, with their divorce being finalised in 2017. In 2018, she married British banker Dominic Bruynseels, former general manager of Banca Comercială Română (BCR) and former CEO of First Bank. An Orthodox wedding ceremony took place in May 2019. On their relationship, Ramona stated in a 2019 interview:

I was still very young, and Dominic, my current husband, was married at the time. Because, at home, my mother raised me to respect family, I tried to resist that feeling. I went as far away from the man I loved as possible. I arrived in America, I married someone else, believing that time and distance could extinguish even the most intense emotions. It wasn't like that

— Ramona-Ioana Bruynseels to Cancan, 8 October 2019

Together, she and Dominic have two daughters named Aryanna-Maria and Aileen-Ioana, born around 2010 and 2012, respectively. The couple has been since at least 2010.
