= 2024–2025 Romanian election annulment protests =

Protests against annulment of Romania's 2024 election

- Date: December 8, 2024 – May 26, 2025
- Location: Romania, mainly in Bucharest
- Caused by: Annulment of the 2024 Romanian presidential election following far-right populist Călin Georgescu first-round victory, following reports of alleged Russian interference and electoral irregularities; Disqualification of Georgescu
- Goals: Resumption of the 2024 election from after the first round (failed); Resignation of Prime Minister Marcel Ciolacu (succeeded)
- Methods: Demonstrations
- Status: Government and pro-European victory: Georgescu-aligned candidate George Simion wins the first round of the repeat election; Resignation of Prime Minister Ciolacu; Nicușor Dan is elected President of Romania on 18 May and sworn in office on 26 May; George Simion loses the 2025 Romanian presidential election; Georgescu retires from politics

Parties
Alliance for the Union of Romanians; Party of Young People; Romanian Socialist Party (2003) Pro-Georgescu protesters Anti-government protesters	Government of Romania: Constitutional Court of Romania; Central Electoral Bureau; Romanian Police; Pro-European counter-protesters

Lead figures
Călin Georgescu; George Simion; Claudiu Târziu (before 9 April 2025); Anamaria Gavrilă	Klaus Iohannis (before 12 February 2025); Ilie Bolojan (after 12 February 2025); Marcel Ciolacu (before 6 May 2025); Cătălin Predoiu; Nicușor Dan; Hunor Kelemen; Varujan Pambuccian; Crin Antonescu

Number
Tens of thousands	

Casualties
- Arrested: ~15

Protests took place across Romania from December 2024 to May 2025 in response to the Constitutional Court of Romania's December 2024 unprecedented decision to invalidate the 2024 Romanian presidential election on 6 December 2024. The controversy began when far-right populist Călin Georgescu unexpectedly won the election's first round on 24 November, prompting the Constitutional Court to state that Georgescu's campaign involved Russian interference and electoral irregularities. Romanian prosecutors launched criminal investigations against Georgescu for supporting fascist groups and electoral violations, while authorities rescheduled the election for May 2025.

Throughout December 2024 to March 2025, pro-Georgescu and anti-government protests escalated in scale and intensity, with tens of thousands gathering in Bucharest during January and March rallies organised by the far-right Alliance for the Unity of Romanians (AUR) party. Led by party leader George Simion, protesters demanded the resumption of elections, accused the government of uprooting democratic principles, and called for Prime Minister Marcel Ciolacu's resignation.

== Background ==
On 24 November, far-right populist candidate Călin Georgescu unexpectedly came first in the election's first round. The surprise outcome immediately sparked allegations of electoral irregularities and potential foreign interference from Russia. Electoral authorities conducted a recount of votes amid growing controversy and protests. Following the election's first round, over one thousand young Romanians assembled in Bucharest's University Square to demonstrate against Georgescu's victory, shouting slogans such as "Putin, don't forget, Romania is not yours". The remarks were in reference to his prior statements describing Putin as "a man who loves his country", and him describing Ukraine as "an invented state". Despite these concerns, preparations continued for a scheduled 8 December runoff election between the top candidates.

In an unprecedented move on 6 December 2024, two days before the planned runoff, Romania's Constitutional Court abruptly annulled the entire election. This extraordinary decision plunged the nation into political uncertainty and triggered widespread public outrage. When publishing its ruling, the Constitutional Court justified the election's annulment by citing several alleged violations found in declassified intelligence. Chief among these were claims regarding illegal utilisation of digital technologies such as artificial intelligence during the campaign. The Constitutional Court referenced the employment of "undeclared sources" of campaign funding, noting that Georgescu had officially reported zero campaign expenditures.

The Constitutional Court reported Russian cyberattacks targeting Romanian electoral systems. Many political analysts pointed to Georgescu's significant social media presence as a key factor in his unexpected success. His TikTok account had amassed over 646,000 followers and 7.2 million likes, raising suspicions among some experts and government officials that his online following may have been artificially inflated. Romania's national security apparatus further alleged that TikTok had granted Georgescu preferential treatment compared to other presidential candidates. Georgescu mounted several legal challenges against the Constitutional Court's decision. He filed an appeal through Romania's domestic court system while simultaneously submitting a complaint to the European Court of Human Rights, seeking international judicial review of the situation.

Following the Constitutional Court's decision, Romanian authorities established new dates for a complete electoral redo, scheduled for 4 May 2025, with a potential runoff planned for 18 May 2025. It was not clarified by officials whether Georgescu would be permitted to participate in the rescheduled electoral process. On 26 February 2025, Romanian prosecutors initiated a criminal investigation into Georgescu's electoral actions. The charges included "incitement to actions against the constitutional order", support of fascist organisations, involvement behind cyberattacks targeting Romanian electoral systems, and submitting false declarations regarding asset disclosures and campaign financing. According to Georgescu's legal representatives, prosecutors placed him under judicial oversight.

== Protests ==
=== December 2024 ===
On 8 December 2024, more than one hundred supporters of Georgescu assembled at voting stations across Romania to protest the unprecedented cancellation of the country's presidential runoff election. The demonstrations occurred on the same day the second round of voting had been scheduled to take place. Protesters shouting slogans including "Down with dictatorship", "We want to vote", and "Thieves". Georgescu personally attended the demonstration, claiming he had come to the closed polling station "in the name of democracy" while accusing authorities of cancelling the elections out of fear he would win.

Later that same day, Simion, Alliance for the Unity of Romanians (AUR) party leader, organised a smaller demonstration at another Bucharest polling station. Approximately two dozen supporters joined Simion, some holding candles and displaying printed signboards with messages including "Stop the dictatorship". During this gathering, Simion addressed reporters, stating: "We are here today to light this candle for democracy in Romania, to say that the Romanian people is sovereign and to oppose a dictatorship." Outside of Romania, dozens of Romanian citizens also gathered at several Romanian embassies throughout Europe to protest the election's cancellation.

=== January 2025 ===
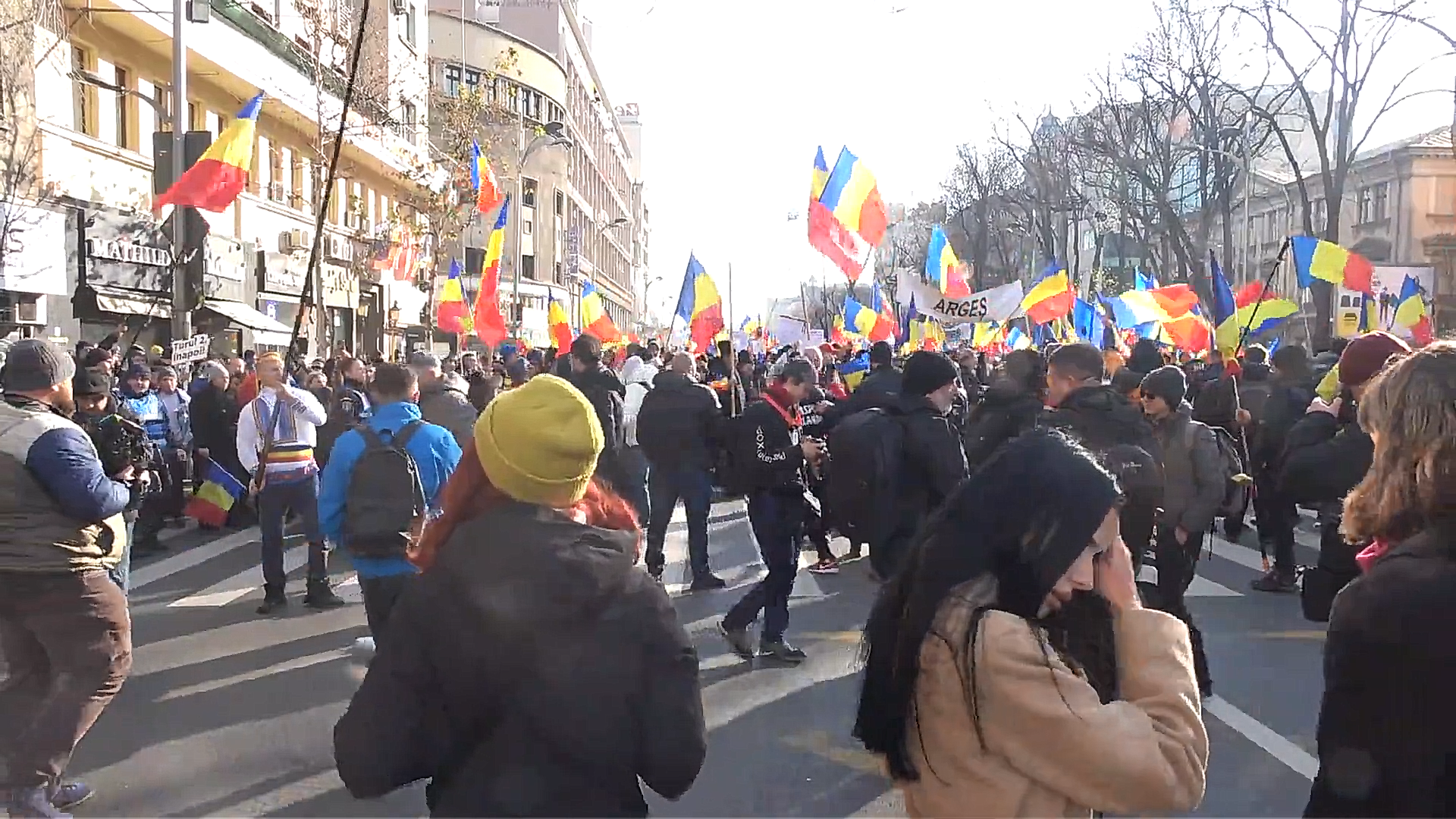
Bucharest, 12 January 2025

On 12 January, tens of thousands of demonstrators assembled at 2 p.m. on Bucharest's University Square, spreading out to other sites with 200 protesting around Victory Square at 10:30 p.m. The demonstration was organised by the AUR party. Simion characterised the Constitutional Court's decision as "a coup d'état that took place on 6 December." He further stated: "We are sorry to discover so late that we were living in a lie and that we were led by people who claimed to be democrats, but are not at all." The AUR party's official demand, as articulated by Simion during the protest, called for the presidential race to resume from the already-completed first round, rather than restarting the entire electoral process.

Protesters conveyed their discontent through various slogans including "Democracy is not optional" and "We want free elections." A particular demand frequently voiced throughout the crowd was for authorities to resume the presidential election from the already-completed first round rather than restarting the entire electoral process, with a large banner reading "Give us back the second round!". Some protesters played vuvuzelas, while others wore Romanian traditional clothing and displayed religious symbols, including flags depicting Jesus. Other demonstrators were filmed and photographed honking horns, carrying Romania's flag, and displaying placards with messages advocating for democratic principles. Protesters also called for Prime Minister Marcel Ciolacu's resignation.

Security forces, including gendarmes, maintained a visible presence throughout the demonstration to ensure public safety while allowing the protest to proceed. A police report stated that while the demonstrations were peaceful, law enforcement had to arrest three protesters due to illegal possession of knives or other forbidden items.

=== February 2025 ===
On 22 February, several thousand demonstrators gathered in central Bucharest outside the Romanian Parliament building to express support for Georgescu and to condemn the annulment of the 2024 Romanian election. The far-right AUR maintained a visible presence at the 22 February protest, with party representatives actively collecting signatures to support his candidacy in the upcoming rescheduled election. Many protesters carried signs with messages directly endorsing Georgescu's candidacy, including slogans including "President Georgescu". Others carried Romanian flags, religious symbols, and placards expressing gratitude toward United States Vice President JD Vance. The placards were in reference to the 2025 JD Vance speech at the Munich Security Conference where he strongly condemned Romania's choice to annul the election as undemocratic, akin to Soviet-era practices, and coming from external influences in the European Union. Georgescu briefly attended the demonstration to march along with and greet supporters.

=== March 2025 ===
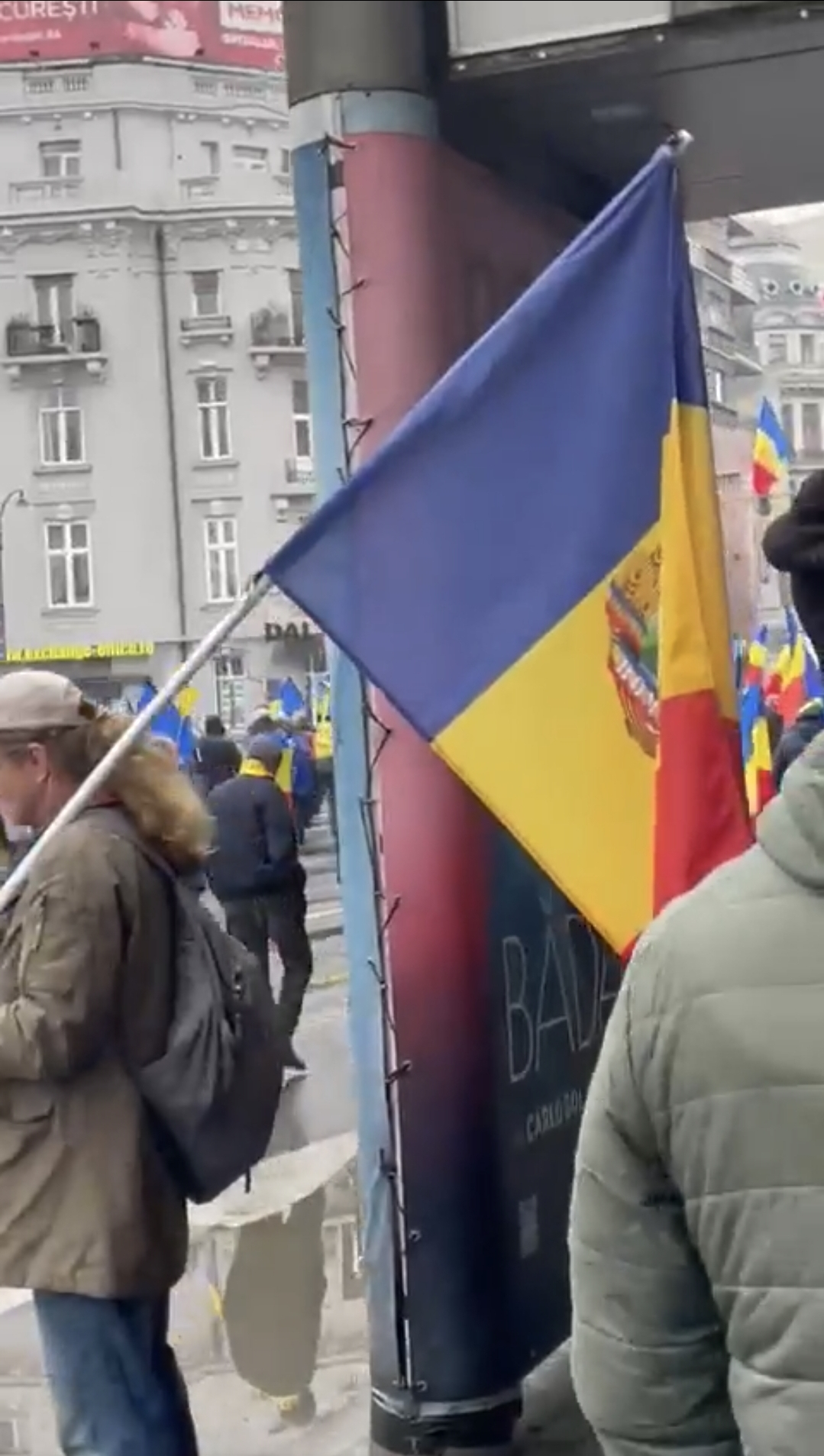
A protester carrying the flag of the Socialist Republic of Romania at a pro-Georgescu rally in Bucharest, on 1 March 2025

On 1 March, tens of thousands of demonstrators converged in Bucharest for a major anti-government rally organised by far-right political groups. The March demonstration specifically targeted Prime Minister Marcel Ciolacu's administration while expressing support for Georgescu. Protesters chanted slogans including "Down with the Government" and "Thieves", and carried images of Georgescu. Several demonstrators went around placing cardboard cutouts depicting Prime Minister Ciolacu into garbage containers. The demonstration occurred just one day after an unsuccessful no-confidence vote in Romania's parliament. The motion, supported by AUR alongside two additional far-right opposition parties, had attempted but failed to remove Ciolacu's pro-Western coalition government formed following the 2024 Romanian parliamentary election held on 1 December.

AUR party leader Simion organised the protest, claiming that democracy in Romania had been "trampled on". When speaking with journalists, Simion explicitly characterised the protest's objectives as efforts to "restore democracy and free elections" while demanding Prime Minister Ciolacu's resignation. He expressed skepticism regarding the integrity of upcoming electoral processes. Party of Young People leader Anamaria Gavrilă also spoke at the protest.

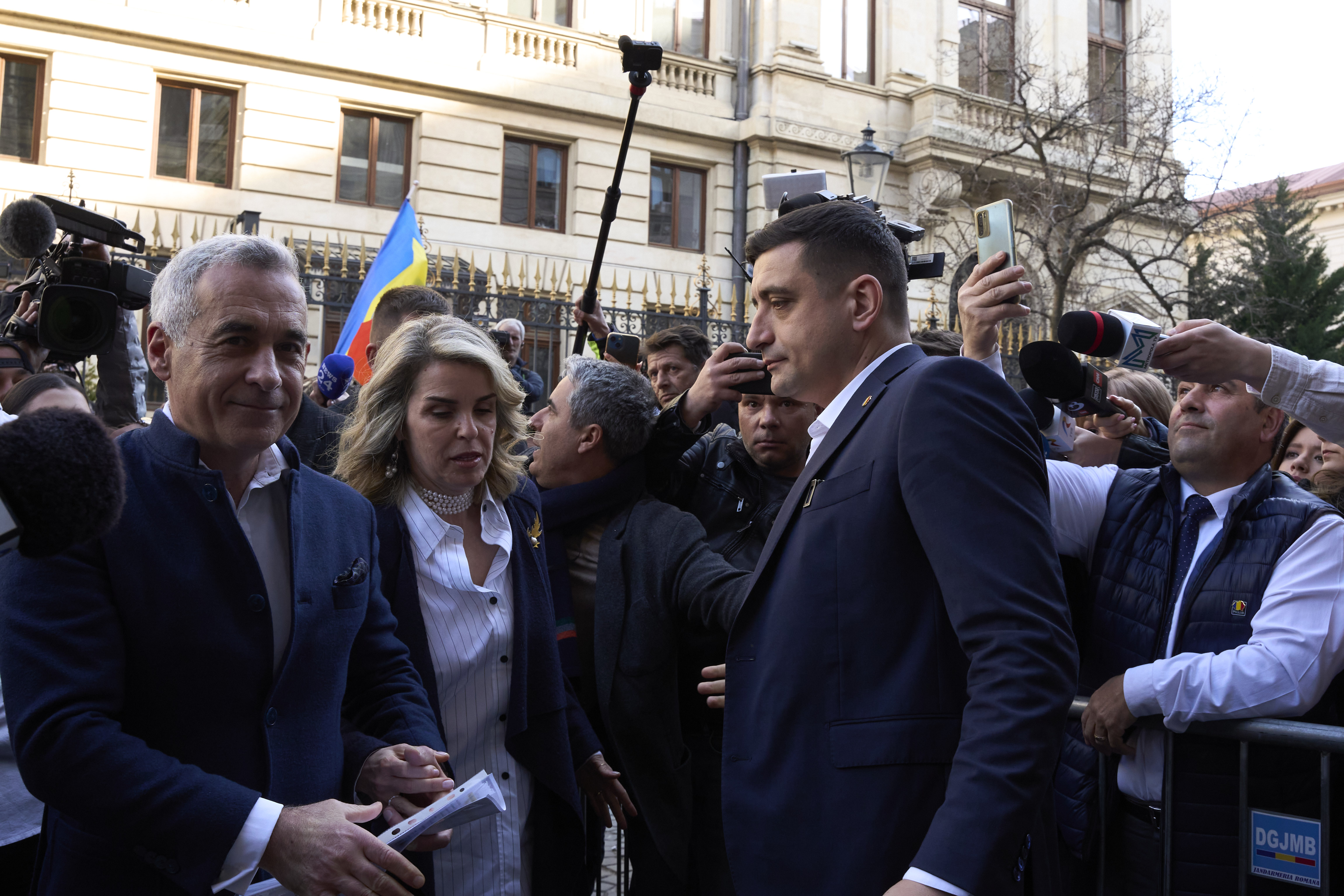
Georgescu arriving with Simion to the Central Electoral Bureau to file his candidacy on 7 March. It was rejected two days later

Georgescu personally attended the 1 March demonstration. During his appearance, he addressed the gathered crowd, claiming that "the system has maliciously tried to divide us" and alleging that "old and new cronies tried to block my candidacy." Georgescu required assistance in leaving the stage after delivering his remarks. Law enforcement and riot police were positioned around the protest area. Reports indicated that the police maintained effective crowd management protocols due to there being no significant reported confrontations between protesters and security forces.

Foreign right-wing nationalist politicians also addressed the 1 March rally, including Bulgarian Revival leader Kostadin Kostadinov, Spanish Vox MEP Hermann Tertsch and Polish Law and Justice MEP Ryszard Czarnecki. On 9 March, Georgescu's candidacy was rejected which led to new protests. On 11 March, The Right Alternative declared its support for the protests. Having announced to do so two days prior, Simion arrived to the Central Electoral Bureau (CEB) on 14 March accompanied by former Polish prime minister Mateusz Morawiecki to file his candidacy for president after collecting 604,000 signatures, above the minimum requirement of 200,000. The CEB approved his candidacy on the following day, which was also the deadline for candidates to register, with Simion stating "We passed the BEC, now let's see if we pass the CCR and return to democracy." The CCR validated his candidacy one day later, as well as the ones of Nicușor Dan and Victor Ponta. Final confirmation that Simion would be allowed to run was given on 19 March, as the CCR rejected all appeals against his candidacy as well as those against Gavrilă. On the same, Gavrilă withdrew her candidacy, endorsing Simion. A final list of all 11 candidates was released on the following day.

On March 15, a pro-European counterprotest was organized in Bucharest and other cities in Romania. It is estimated that more than 15,000 people participated, according to Radio Free Europe. Protests ended on 26 May, the day Nicușor Dan was inaugurated as 6th President of Romania.

== See also ==
- 2012 Romanian constitutional crisis
- 2017–2019 Romanian protests
- 2025 Romanian coup d'état attempt allegations
