= Party of Young People =

Party of Young People Partidul Oamenilor Tineri
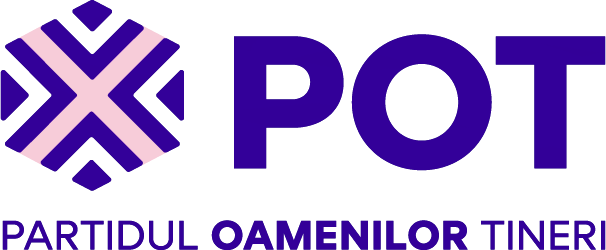
- Abbreviation: POT
- President: Anamaria Gavrilă
- General Secretary: Bianca-Eugenia Gavrilă
- Executive General Secretary: Ancuța-Florina Irimia
- Leader in the Chamber of Deputies: Anamaria Gavrilă
- Founder: Anamaria Gavrilă
- Founded: 31 July 2023
- Split from: Alliance for the Union of Romanians
- Headquarters: Aleea Plopilor, Nr.4, Deva
- Ideology: Romanian nationalism; Right-wing populism; Euroscepticism
- Political position: Right-wing to far-right
- European affiliation: European Conservatives, Patriots & Affiliates
- Colours: Indigo; Pastel pink
- Senate: 0 / 135
- Chamber of Deputies: 13 / 330
- European Parliament: 0 / 33
- Local councils: 11 / 39,900

Website
- sieupot.ro

The Party of Young People (Romanian: Partidul Oamenilor Tineri; POT, lit. '[I] can/ [They] can') is a far-right political party in Romania, founded by MP Anamaria Gavrilă, who had previously left the Alliance for the Union of Romanians (AUR). POT supported the candidacy of independent Călin Georgescu in the 2024 presidential election, even before Georgescu appeared in opinion polls.

== History ==
The Party of Young People was founded by Anamaria Gavrilă on 31 July 2023.

=== 2024 elections ===
In the 2024 local elections, the party won 11 local councillor mandates. The party did not participate in the 2024 European Parliament election.

For the 2024 parliamentary election, the party has nominated over 140 candidates from various professions (entrepreneurs, lawyers, drivers, sales specialists, engineers), including many candidates from the diaspora.

=== Support for Georgescu's candidacy ===
The Party of Young People attempted to register Anamaria Gavrilă's candidacy for the 2024 presidential election, but later gave up and chose to support Călin Georgescu following an internal poll. The party strongly associates itself with Georgescu and calls on Georgescu voters to vote for it in the parliamentary elections.

Party of Young People campaigns heavily on social media, such as TikTok, Instagram and Telegram (often through viral videos). Party president Anamaria Gavrilă has collected almost 3 million likes on Instagram for her political posts. The party holds money giveaways and contests for the best posts to promote itself and Georgescu, and encourages the use of the hashtag #POT.

=== Decline ===
After the 2025 presidential election, in which POT-backed candidate George Simion lost the second round to independent mayor of Bucharest Nicușor Dan, 6 deputies (inc. Călin Groza) and 5 senators left the party, citing a departure from its original values, and leaving it without a parliamentary group in the senate.

== Ideology ==
The Party of Young People has been described as right-wing, sovereigntist, anti-establishment, nationalist, pro-Trump and right-wing populist, opposing abortion rights and promoting vaccine hesitancy. It declares itself to be a supporter of traditional and Christian values. It supports free market economics. Most organisations and political leaders consider the party to be Eurosceptic although Anamaria Gavrilă declared "We were and will remain Europeans".

POT defines itself as centre-right. The party does not present a clear political platform, but only supports the "Romanian mission". In its rhetoric, the party often uses words such as faith, God, miracle, etc. POT is considered a splinter party known in Romanian media as the "new AUR" and sharply criticizes the PSD and PNL parties.

The party supports animal rights and in April 2025, several POT MPs initiated a legislative project aimed at improving the protection of animals, especially dogs, and solving the problem of stray dogs on the streets.

== Electoral history ==
=== Legislative elections ===
Election	Chamber			Senate			Position	Aftermath
Election	Votes	%	Seats	Votes	%	Seats	Position	Aftermath
2024	596,736	6.46	24 / 331	591,927	6.39	7 / 134	6th	Opposition to PSD-PNL-UDMR minority government (2024–2025)
2024	596,736	6.46	24 / 331	591,927	6.39	7 / 134	6th	Opposition to PSD-PNL-USR-UDMR government (2025–present)

=== Presidential elections ===
Election	Candidate	First round			Second round		
Election	Candidate	Votes	Percentage	Position	Votes	Percentage	Position
2024	Endorsed Călin Georgescu	2,120,401	22.94%	1st	Annulled		
2025	Endorsed George Simion	3,862,761	40.96%	1st	5,339,053	46.40%	2nd
