= Călin Groza =

Romanian politician (born 1983)

Member of the Chamber of Deputies
- Incumbent
- Assumed office 21 December 2024
- Constituency: Maramureș

Personal details
- Born: 29 July 1983 (age 43) Baia Mare, Socialist Republic of Romania
- Party: independent
- Other political affiliations: Party of Young People (2024–2025)

Călin-Florin Groza (born 29 July 1983, Baia Mare, Romania) is a Romanian politician, elected in 2024 to the Chamber of Deputies, where he represents the 26th Maramureș constituency. He is secretary of the Transport Committee. He is currently an independent.

== Activity ==
Following the 2024 parliamentary elections, Călin Groza was elected as a member of the Chamber of Deputies representing the Party of Young People (Partidul Oamenilor Tineri), in constituency no. 26 Maramureș, assuming office on 21 December.

On 21 May 2025, together with five other parliamentarians, he left the Party of Young People, becoming an independent member of parliament and joining the group of non-affiliated members.

In June 2025, he announced the launch of the legislative process known as “Andreea’s Law”, aimed at the prevention and combating of violence against women and femicide.

Călin Groza is active in several parliamentary friendship groups with other states. He serves as President of the Parliamentary Friendship Groups with the Kingdom of Cambodia, the Republic of Sudan, the People's Republic of Bangladesh, and the Syrian Arab Republic. He is also Vice President of the parliamentary friendship group with the Republic of Tajikistan, and a member of the friendship groups with the Lebanese Republic, the Portuguese Republic, Turkmenistan, the Republic of Armenia, and the Republic of Peru.

During his first parliamentary session, he initiated 22 legislative proposals and submitted 64 questions and interpellations in plenary sessions.

A PressHub analysis published in September 2025, which examined the activity of Romanian parliamentarians within parliamentary friendship groups, identified Groza as the most active among those contacted. The analysis highlighted his organization of an official meeting with representatives of the Embassy of the Syrian Arab Republic in Romania, another official meeting at the Romanian Parliament with the Ambassador of the People's Republic of Bangladesh, Shahnaz Gazi, as well as his participation in the Black Sea Security Forum in Odesa, dedicated to security challenges in the Black Sea region. The analysis also noted his reception by Ambassador Iulia Pataki at the Romanian Embassy in Addis Ababa, along with his participation in an Ethiopian cultural festival.

In September 2025, together with nine deputies and twelve senators, he announced the establishment of the Independent Parliamentary Group in the Chamber of Deputies and the PACE – Romania First parliamentary group in the Senate of Romania, marking the first major parliamentary reconfiguration of the 2024–2028 legislature. As Secretary of the Committee on Transport and Infrastructure, in October 2025 he conducted a working visit to the Port of Constanța. In the same month, he also stood out through his participation from 22 to 24 October in the Aspen–GMF Bucharest Forum 2025, a landmark event for strategic dialogue and public diplomacy in the Black Sea region and the transatlantic space, organized by Mircea Geoană's Aspen Romania.

As a deputy representing Maramureș, he has drawn attention to the need to rehabilitate and preserve the Vaser Valley narrow-gauge railway (Mocănița), which he considers part of the “national cultural and technical heritage, a symbol of Maramureș’s industrial history, and a vital economic driver for local communities.” He has also described as vital and of national interest the modernization of the railway line connecting Baia Mare (Maramureș) to Satu Mare, given the outdated state of the current infrastructure.

According to political sources cited at the end of December, the emergence of a new parliamentary political party is anticipated, within which Călin Groza is expected to hold the position of Secretary General.

== Electoral history ==
Year	Election	First round		
Year	Election	Votes	Percentage	Position
2024	Parliamentary (Maramureș)	10.253	5.65%	6th
