= Oleksiy Goncharenko =

Ukrainian politician

- Олексій Гончаренко
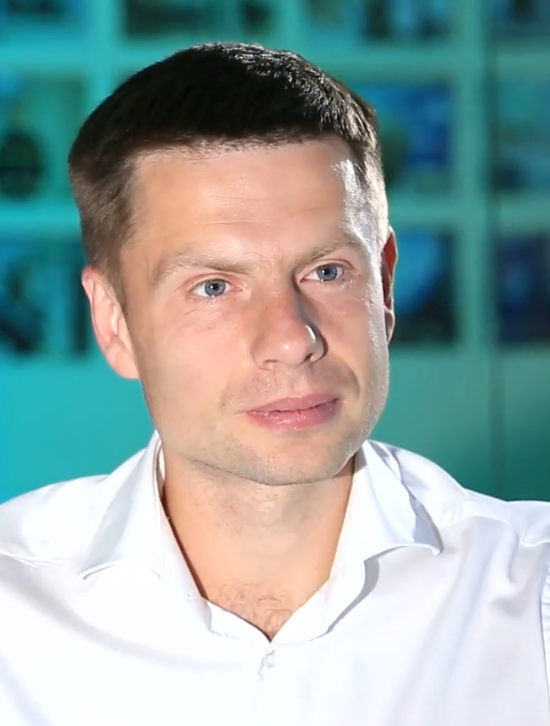
- Goncharenko in 2021

People's Deputy of Ukraine
- Incumbent
- Assumed office 27 November 2014
- Parliamentary group: European Solidarity (until 2026)
- Constituency: 137th (Podilsk)

President of the PACE Committee on Migration
- Incumbent
- Assumed office 24 January 2022

Member of the Verkhovna Rada of Ukraine delegation in PACE
- Incumbent
- Assumed office 2015

Chairman of the Odesa Oblast Council
- In office 14 August 2014 – 21 November 2014
- Preceded by: Mykola Tindyuk
- Succeeded by: Mykhailo Shmushkovych

Deputy Chairman of the Odesa Oblast Council
- In office 16 November 2010 – 22 February 2014

Personal details
- Born: 16 September 1980 (age 46) Odesa, Ukrainian SSR, Soviet Union
- Other political affiliations: Party of Greens of Ukraine (2001–2005); Soyuz (2005); Party of Regions (2005–2014); European Solidarity (2014-2026)
- Parent: Oleksiy Kostusyev (father)
- Education: Odesa National Medical University; Russian Presidential Academy of National Economy and Public Administration
- Committees: Member of the Committee of the Verkhovna Rada on issues of budget

Military service
- Branch/service: Medical Forces Command
- Rank: Reserve Lieutenant

YouTube information
- Channels: Oleksiy Goncharenko - Ukrainian MP; Алексей Гончаренко
- Genre: Politics
- Subscribers: 720 thousand
- Views: 295 million
- Last updated: July 2022

Oleksiy Oleksiyovich Goncharenko (Ukrainian: Олексій Олексійович Гончаренко; born 16 September 1980) is a Ukrainian politician and content creator, member of the Ukrainian parliament, member of the Ukrainian delegation to the Parliamentary Assembly of the Council of Europe, President of the PACE Committee on Migration, Refugees and Internally Displaced Persons. In 2014, he was elected to the Verkhovna Rada on the party list of Petro Poroshenko Bloc. In the 2019 Ukrainian parliamentary election Goncharenko was reelected as an independent candidate in the single-seat constituency No. 137 (Podilsk). He continued to be part of the Petro Poroshenko Bloc's parliamentary group, later renamed European Solidarity, until his removal by the party's decision in October 2026.

== Biography ==
Goncharenko is a son of former mayor of Odesa Oleksiy Kostusyev. His parents divorced when he was three years old.

From 1999 until 2001 Goncharenko worked in the Odesa emergency medical station. In 2002 he graduated with honors from Medical University, but chose a political career over a medical one.

In 2002, at age 21, he ran unsuccessfully for the Odesa City Council of the District in the village Tairove. After that he worked as an assistant for a deputy of the city council.

From 2002, Goncharenko was a student at Financial University under the Government of the Russian Federation in Moscow, Russia (Graduate School of Financial Management). He graduated from the academy in 2005, receiving a degree in economics.

== Political activity ==
In 2005, he was elected chairman of the Odesa city organization of the party Soyuz.

In 2006 and 2010, he was elected to the Odesa City Council for Party of Regions. In the party, he maintained a russophile, pro-Russia political stance.

During the 2012 Ukrainian parliamentary election he was a candidate in majority district 133 (in Odesa) lost to Ihor Markov with 20.6% of the votes (Markov gained 26.6%).

Before Euromaidan, Goncharenko was a member of the Party of Regions. On 19 February 2014 after the first deaths of the Euromaidan-protests Goncharenko wrote the statement on his withdrawal from the Party of Regions.

In the 2014 Ukrainian parliamentary election he was elected into the Ukrainian parliament for Petro Poroshenko Bloc placed number 40 on the party list. He became deputy head of the faction.

In the 2019 Ukrainian parliamentary election Goncharenko was reelected as an independent candidate in single-seat constituency 137 (Podilsk). Goncharenko was then a member of the European Solidarity faction in the Verkhovna Rada.

On 1 March 2015 Goncharenko was arrested by Russian police during Nemtsov Memorial March. According to Goncharenko when in detention he was beaten and deprived of medical and legal help. Goncharenko was released from prison the next day but he promised to sue Russian Ministry of Internal Affairs.

He was included in the list of sanctions of the Russian Federation. On 5 October 2026, he was expelled from the European Solidarity parliamentary group following his calls to make concessions to Russia regarding the peace process.

== PACE ==
Since 2015, Oleksiy Goncharenko has been a member of the Permanent Delegation of the Verkhovna Rada to the Parliamentary Assembly of the Council of Europe. Throughout all these years, he sharply criticised Russia for violating human rights. Since 2019, he has opposed the return of the Russian delegation to work in PACE.

During his speeches in the Parliamentary Assembly, he criticised Moscow for human rights violations in the temporarily occupied Crimea and parts of the Donetsk and Luhansk regions, fought against Russian propaganda and narratives that the Kremlin planted through its delegates in PACE.

On 9 October 2018, Oleksiy Goncharenko spoke at a meeting of the Parliamentary Assembly of the Council of Europe in large rubber gloves. He said that without gloves it would be "unsafe to shake hands and touch door handles", hinting at the accusations of Russia in the poisoning of Skripals.

He repeatedly raised the issue of human rights violations in Belarus and the illegal actions of the Lukashenko regime. The Secretary General of the Council of Europe and the Committee of Ministers of the Council of Europe supported the creation of a special group that would be able to monitor and follow the situation in Belarus following Olekii's many statements on the issue. Belarus is not a member of the Council of Europe, therefore it does not have its own delegation there but Goncharenko actively promotes the topic of sanctions against the dictatorial regime of Lukashenko in Belarus and works towards the state's democratisation.

During the spring session in PACE in 2022, he actively advocated the creation of an international tribunal that would investigate Russian war crimes in Ukraine. As a result, PACE called for the urgent establishment of such a tribunal soon afterwards.

Goncharenko opposes the participation of Belarusian and Russian athletes in the Olympics in Paris. Actively supported and promoted the resolution on this issue in PACE.

In January 2024, Goncharenko was appointed chairman of the PACE Committee on Migration, Refugees and Displaced Persons.

Oleksiy Goncharenko is actively working to protect the rights of Ukrainian refugees in Europe. The PACE Committee on Migration, chaired by him, prepared a special report "An urgent call to Europe and its partners: envisioning immediate and long-term policy solutions in support of the displaced people of Ukraine". There are proposed a number of steps that will improve the situation of Ukrainian refugees in Europe.

== War in Ukraine ==
After the start of a full-scale Russian invasion of Ukraine, Oleksii continued to fight Russian propaganda, which Goncharenko opposed to throughout all 8 years of the war. He began to actively cooperate with dozens of international media in order to bring the truth to the world about the real situation in Ukraine, as well as to draw direct attention to the necessary support measures that Western countries can provide.

He held online meetings with US congressmen and advocated tougher sanctions against Russia. For example, during a conversation with 50 US congressmen, he insisted on imposing an embargo on Russian oil and gas. Later, the United States imposed a ban on the export of Russian oil.

During the spring session of PACE in April 2022, he advocated holding a special international tribunal for Russian war crimes in Ukraine. As a result, the Parliamentary Assembly adopted a resolution calling for the establishment of such a tribunal.

During a visit to London in May 2022, he raised the issue of creating an international tribunal in a conversation with Foreign Minister Liz Truss. The head of the British Foreign Office assured that she had already discussed this possibility with the country's attorney general. In addition, Goncharenko actively promoted the idea of seizing the assets of Russian oligarchs and using these funds for the benefit of Ukraine.

During the NATO summit in Madrid, he raised the issue of security in Ukraine and in Europe with leading European politicians.

Goncharenko supports Kosovar independence.

In December 2022, an international coalition on sanctions was created. Congressman, co-chair of the Helsinki Commission of the US Congress Steve Cohen, congressman, member of the Helsinki Commission Joe Wilson, MP Oleksiy Goncharenko, member of the Parliament of Great Britain Robert Sealy, head of the Estonian delegation to the PACE Erik Kross, member of the European Parliament from Lithuania Pietras Aushtrevičius, head of the Polish delegation at the Council of Europe Arkadiusz Mulyarczyk. They have already sent requests to Antony Blinken and Josep Borrell for sanctions against Roman Abramovich, Ksenia Sobchak, Vladimir Potanin, Vladimir Lisin, Philipp Kirkorov and other Putin's close friends.

In May 2023, Russia added Goncharenko to the list of terrorists and extremists.

A court in Moscow rendered a verdict in absentia Goncharenko to 10 years in prison. Now he "must" spend three years in prison and seven years in a penitentiary, and cannot administer websites. The Russian court believes that the Ukrainian MP spread "fakes" motivated by political hatred, justified terrorism and incited hatred with the threat of violence.

Oleksiy Goncharenko lectured on Ukraine at Ivy League: Yale, the University of Pennsylvania, Princeton University, and Dartmouth College.

In 2024, the Black Sea Security Forum was initiated by a group of Ukrainian parliamentarians. Oleksiy Goncharenko serves as its Сhairman, leading the forum’s efforts to address regional security, Euro-Atlantic integration, and hybrid threats in the Black Sea region.

== Belarus ==
Prior to the 2020 elections in Belarus, Goncharenko anticipated that Lukashenko might seize power. To this end, he established an inter-factional association called 'For Democratic Belarus' within the Verkhovna Rada, with the aim of monitoring the situation in the neighbouring country at a parliamentary level. Lukashenko subsequently refused to transfer power democratically, instead persecuting the opposition, suppressing mass protests by force, torturing detained protesters and opening criminal cases.

Goncarenko has repeatedly raised the issue of human rights violations in Belarus at the Parliamentary Assembly of the Council of Europe. The Secretary General and the Committee of Ministers of the Council of Europe have supported the establishment of a special group to monitor the situation in Belarus.

Goncharenko is in contact with Svetlana Tikhanovskaya's office and has met with her several times to discuss the state of human rights in Belarus and possible support from Ukraine for Belarusians living there.

== Goncharenko centres ==
Oleksii Goncharenko is a founder of the Ukrainian network of educational and cultural centres, Goncharenko Centre. The main goal of them is to enable residents of small towns of Ukraine to learn foreign languages for free and improve their skills in other areas of science, art, and provide social activities opportunities.

Thousands of children and adults visited social and cultural centres, thanks to free courses, schoolchildren improved their knowledge and easily entered universities, and adults received a great motivation for learning foreign languages and inspiration for mastering new knowledge. More than 5 thousand people have completed the English language course and received the A2 language proficiency level. 1100 children prepared for the exam in English and in history at the Goncharenko Centres. Goncharenko Centres are visited by about 25 thousand people every month.

The Goncharenko Centres are funded by patrons and sponsors who are ready to invest in education and a better future for Ukrainians.

As of 23 February 2022, there were 24 Goncharenko Centres, including three centres in Donbas - in Kramatorsk, Konstiantynivka, and Lyman. The Goncharenko Centre employs about 89 people. After the start of the war, the Goncharenko Centres were reformatted into volunteer hubs, which now help not only the injured and Ukrainians in need, but also the military. The centres located in Donbas, and in the Kharkiv region – in the village of Dergachi, as well as in Chernihiv (in these cities the situation was the most difficult due to shelling and the Russian offensive) have worked for as long as it was possible.

During a Russian missile attack on the center of Chernihiv in August 2023, the Goncharenko Center was also damaged. The blast wave in the building knocked out the windows, the administrator was injured.

== Other ==
On 23 February 2017, it was reported that Goncharenko had been kidnapped by unidentified attackers in Odesa. A few hours in a televised interview Goncharenko said he "was in a safe place" and Ukrainian prosecutors reported that the people involved in the kidnapping had been detained. Goncharenko claimed that his abduction was staged by the Ukrainian Security Service so that "separatist, terrorist groups operating in Odesa who planned causing me serious bodily harm" could be arrested.

On 1 November 2018, Oleksiy Goncharenko was included in the Russian sanctions list in connection with Ukraine's unfriendly actions towards citizens and legal entities of the Russian Federation.

On 8 February 2017, Goncharenko painted with red paint the word "Nein" (which is translated from German as "No") on the fragment of the Berlin Wall, installed in front of the Embassy of Germany in Kyiv. With this action, Goncharenko protested against the statement of the German Ambassador to Ukraine, Ernst Reichel, who said that the absence of Russian troops was not a prerequisite for holding elections in the Donbas. The Embassy of Germany in Kyiv responded to the incident with the following statement: "The Embassy of the Federal Republic of Germany is very much regretting the damage and disfigurement of the fragment of the historic Berlin Wall located on the territory of the Embassy by deputy Goncharenko. At the same time, there is a violation of the Vienna Convention on Diplomatic Relations."

== Earnings ==
In 2010, in an interview with journalist Roman Skrypin, Goncharenko explained the origin of the 700 thousand dollars indicated in the 2010 declaration. He said that he borrowed the money from his father-in-law who worked at Gazprom.

According to the electronic declaration, in 2016, Goncharenko earned ₴152.8 thousand as a deputy, he also received ₴166.36 thousand compensation for rental housing, as well as ₴26.4 thousand compensation for travel throughout the country. Deposits in banks brought Goncharenko ₴97 thousand. His wife received from business activities ₴1.43 million. The deputy had ₴177 thousand and €54.5 thousand on accounts in banks, as well as US$45 thousand in cash. Goncharenko declared two apartments in Kyiv (with an area of 141.2 m^{2}) and Odesa (with an area of 75.5 m^{2}). Olha Goncharenko owns an apartment in Mykolaiv with an area of 54.5 m^{2}.

== Personal life ==
Goncharenko is married to Olha, with whom he shared classes at Medical University. The couple have two sons. The younger son, Kyrylo, is in elementary school. The older son, Oleksii, is studying at one of the universities in Odesa.

Goncharenko has stated that he has not spoken to his father Oleksiy Kostusyev since 2009, when both ran for the position of mayor of Odesa, until Goncharenko dropped out of the race. He has described this as unfortunate, stating that he would be happy to resume contact with his father, but does not know how to contact him.
