= Ukraine's 137th electoral district =

No.137
- Single-mandate constituency
- Oblast: Odesa Oblast
- Major settlements: Podilsk, Balta

Current single-mandate constituency
- Created: 28 April 2012
- Seats: Single MP
Current MP
Oleksiy Goncharenko
Independent (Note: In the Petro Poroshenko Bloc (later renamed European Solidarity) parliamentary group until his removal in October 2026) (since 2019)

Electoral district 137 (Ukrainian: Одномандатний виборчий округ №137, Odnomandatnyi vyborchyi okruh №137), shortened to OVO No.137 (Ukrainian: ОВО №137) is one of 225 electoral districts that elects a member of parliament (people's deputy) to the Verkhovna Rada, Ukraine's national parliament.

The district is located in Odesa Oblast. It was created in its current form by the No. 82 decree of the Central Election Commission on 28 April 2012 (before this, a different form of electoral districts existed in the country). The electoral commission of the district operates in the cultural building of Podilsk, Shevchenko Avenue, 28.

The electoral district encompasses Balta and Podilsk, as well as the districts of Balta, Kodyma, Okny, Podilsk, and Savran. The 137th electoral district borders the 16th to its north, the 17th to its south, the 101st and the 132nd to its north-east, 138th to its east, 139th to its south-east, as well as bordering the Moldova–Ukraine border.

The district's area is 3,985 square kilometres (1,539 sq mi).

== List of deputies ==
Name	Image	Party	Convocation	Took office	Left office	Time in office	Ref.
Leonid Klimov		Party of Regions	7th	12 December 2012	27 November 2014	1 year, 350 days	
Leonid Klimov		Independent	8th	27 November 2014	29 August 2019	4 years, 275 days	
Oleksiy Goncharenko		Independent	9th	29 August 2019	Incumbent	7 years, 44 days	

== Latest election ==
2019 Ukrainian parliamentary election
Party	Candidate	Votes	%	±%
Independent	Oleksiy Goncharenko	20,425	29.55	
Servant of the People	Oleksandr Mukonin	16,903	24.45	
Independent	Leonid Klimov	15,963	23.09	
Opposition Platform	Volodymyr Osipov	4,604	6.66	
Batkivshchyna	Mykhailo Lazarenko	2,786	4.03	
Independent	Oleksandr Malanin	1,406	2.03	
Independent	Oleh Mukonin	1,359	1.96	
Independent	Vasyl Klimov	960	1.38	
Independent	Yakiv Ostash	845	1.22	
Holos	Pavlo Mul	747	1.08	
Radical Party	Lyseiko Oksana	704	1.01	
Independent	Denys Klimov	641	0.92	
Opposition Bloc	Volodymyr Mazur	447	0.64	
Independent	Viktor Hlushchenko	282	0.4	
Civil Position	Vadym Hromov	244	0.35	
Independent	Oleksiy Dovzhenko	226	0.32	
Social Justice (Ukraine)	Serhii Hrytskyi	222	0.32	
Independent	Artem Novikov	88	0.12	
Independent	Natalia Rekichanska	78	0.11	
Independent	Serhii Dzhum	64	0.09	
Independent	Olena Ustinova	61	0.08	
Independent	Anatolii Khalabuda	57	0.08	
Total votes		131,629	100.0	
Independent gain from Servant of the People		Swing	▲5.1	
