= Anamaria Gavrilă =

Romanian politician (born 1983)

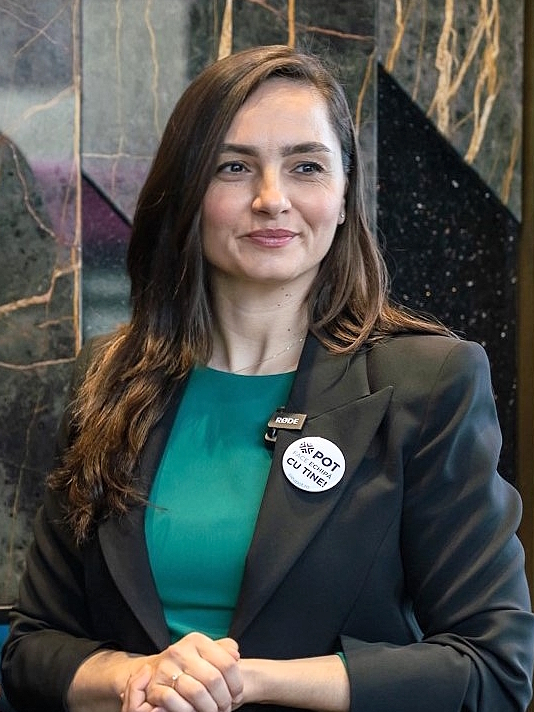

Leader of the Party of Young People
- Incumbent
- Assumed office 31 July 2023
- Preceded by: Position established

Member of the Chamber of Deputies
- Incumbent
- Assumed office 21 December 2020
- Constituency: Hunedoara

Personal details
- Born: 15 October 1983 (age 42) Deva, Socialist Republic of Romania
- Party: POT (since 2023)
- Other political affiliations: AUR (until 2021)
- Education: West University of Timișoara; University of Reading; International Real Estate Business School Regensburg, Germany

Anamaria Gavrilă (born 15 October 1983) is a Romanian politician of the Party of Young People. Since 2020, she has been a member of the Chamber of Deputies. She was a member of the Alliance for the Union of Romanians until 2021, and founded the Party of Young People in 2023. She was a member of the Parliamentary Assembly of the Council of Europe in 2021, and was a candidate for mayor of Deva in the 2020 and 2024 local elections.

== Early life and career ==
Gavrilă was born in Deva, Hunedoara County. After completing secondary studies at the Traian High School in her native city, she graduated from the West University of Timișoara in 2005. She then lived in Germany for seven years, and in the United Kingdom for eight years. In the 2020 local elections, she was elected municipal councillor of Deva.

== Electoral history ==
Year	Election	First round		
Year	Election	Votes	Percentage	Position
2020	Mayoral (Deva)	1,426	6.93%	5th
2024	Mayoral (Deva)	3,525	14.97%	3rd
2024	Parliamentary (Hunedoara)	16,400	9.36%	4th
