= Radu Theodoru =

Romanian general, writer and Holocaust denier (1924–2025)

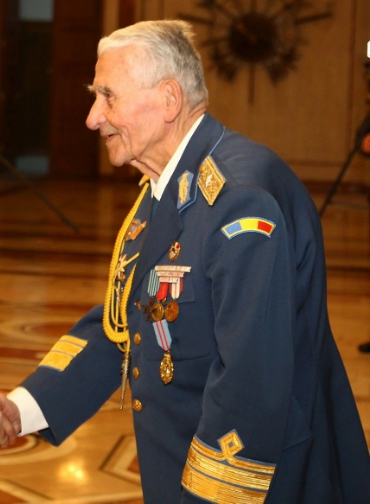
- Theodoru in 2016

Personal details
- Born: 17 January 1924 Ineu, Arad County, Romania
- Died: 8 December 2025 (aged 101)
- Resting place: Comana Monastery
- Party: Greater Romania Party
- Other political affiliations: "Vlad the Impaler" Command Post; Romanian Communist Party (before 1989)
- Profession: General officer, writer, politician

Radu Theodoru (17 January 1924 – 8 December 2025) was a Romanian writer, general, far-right politician and Holocaust denier.

== Life and career ==
Theodoru was born in Ineu on 17 January 1924.

During the communist era, his writings belonged to the socialist realism movement.

Theodoru was a far-right politician and general who engaged in Holocaust denial. A former member of the Romanian Communist Party, Theodoru was among the founders of the Greater Romania Party, holding the position of vice-president, but he was ousted from the party after a conflict with the then-president of the party, Corneliu Vadim Tudor.

In March 2025, he was detained by the Romanian government after prosecutors accused him of trying to overthrow the government with alleged Russian support. He was 101 years old when his house was raided during the government investigation into the planned coup.

The criminal charge is treason. Politico, HotNews, Euronews and Adevărul stated that he was an antisemite.

Theodoru was an admirer of Joseph Stalin, because "he sought to destroy Zionism". He also admired Russian president Vladimir Putin. Far-right Romanian politician Diana Șoșoacă has publicly supported Theodoru. After Theodoru's arrest, presidential candidate and former Prime Minister Victor Ponta also supported Theodoru, claiming that "political opinions are not crimes".

On 11 June 2025, he participated in a pre-celebration reception ahead of Russia Day at the Russian embassy in Bucharest, together with Șoșoacă.

Theodoru died on 8 December 2025, at the age of 101.
