= 2025 Romanian coup d'état attempt allegations =

In March 2025, the government of Romania arrested six suspects on charges of plotting to overthrow the government. Those arrested were in contact with Radu Theodoru, a 101-year-old retired general and Holocaust denier, whose residence was searched by law enforcement, and were accused of links with Russia. Minister of National Defence Angel Tîlvăr apologised publicly for a letter that Theodoru received from the Ministry of National Defence congratulating him on his 101st birthday; Tîlvăr stated that the letter should not have been sent due to the retired general's antisemitic and xenophobic public views.

The group's web page stated among its aims: changing the country's name to Getia (Geția), exiting from NATO, abolishing the Constitution of Romania and political parties in Romania, taking over territories that were part of Greater Romania (part of them in Ukraine). To this end, they created a "paramilitary structure" that according to prosecutors was to stage a coup. The General Staff of this structure was led by Theodoru. The conspiracy glorified life in Communist Romania as a model to follow. The culture and political life of the Getic state was to be founded on pseudohistory. The group's web page also mentioned an "army" called Opus Nostrum that was to be led by the 101 year-old general, and the nucleus of politicians was called The Command Post Vlad the Impaler.

== See also ==
- 2022 German coup d'état plot
- 2024–2025 Romanian election annulment protests
- Dacianism
- Getae, an ancient people on the lower Danube
