= Black Sea Security Forum =

Annual forum for the Black Sea region

- Чорноморський безпековий форум
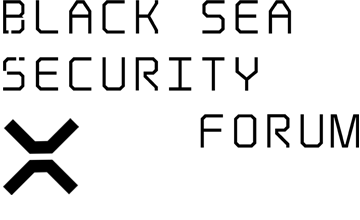
- Logo
- Nickname: Odesa Forum
- Formation: 2024
- Headquarters: Odesa, Ukraine
- Region served: Black Sea region
- Chair: Oleksiy Goncharenko
- Website: https://odesaforum.org/

The Black Sea Security Forum, also known as the Odesa Forum, is an annual international forum held in Odesa, dedicated to discussing current security, economic, and political challenges in the Black Sea region. The forum was initiated in 2024 by a group of Members of the Ukrainian Parliament, becoming the first and largest geopolitical event in southern Ukraine since the beginning of Russia's full-scale invasion in 2022. The initiator and head of the forum is a Member of Parliament Oleksii Goncharenko.

== Mission ==
The mission of the forum is to establish an annual international platform for discussing security challenges in the Black Sea region and beyond — a region described as a "focal point of intense geopolitical confrontation." The event brings together politicians, diplomats, military officials, business leaders, and experts to foster high-level dialogue and strategic cooperation aimed at strengthening regional security and resilience.

The choice of Odesa as the host city is driven by its status as the "maritime gateway of Ukraine", a key point of global geopolitics, the largest city in southern Ukraine, and one of the major ports of the Black Sea. The organizers emphasize that overcoming Russia's naval blockade of Odesa's ports marked a turning point in the war.

== History ==
=== Black Sea Security Forum 2024 ===
The first Black Sea Security Forum took place from June 14 to 16, 2024, in Odesa. It brought together over 350 participants from various countries around the world, including the United States, the United Kingdom, France, Germany, Australia, Poland, Moldova, and others.

The key topics of the event included the security situation in the Black Sea, the consequences of Russian aggression, the protection of Odesa's ports, and ways to address urgent issues, in particular, demining the maritime area, ensuring free navigation, and providing Ukraine with additional air defense systems.

Among the forum's speakers were:

- U.S. Ambassador to Ukraine Bridget Brink
- Former NATO Supreme Allied Commander Europe General Wesley Clark
- Former Prime Minister of Australia Tony Abbott
- U.S. Special Representative for Ukraine Negotiations (2017–2019) Kurt Volker
- Retired British Army Colonel Richard Justin Kemp
- Minister of Foreign Affairs of Moldova Mihai Popșoi
- Deputy Speaker of the Polish Sejm Michał Kamiński
- Senior Fellow at the Hudson Institute Luke Coffey
- Representative of the Ukrainian Navy Command, Colonel Mykhailo Tretiak

Video addresses were delivered by:

- François Hollande, the 24th President of France
- Cindy McCain, Executive Director of the UN World Food Programme
- James O'Brien, U.S. Assistant Secretary of State for European and Eurasian Affairs
- Michael Carpenter, Senior Director for Europe at the U.S. National Security Council
- Andriy Yermak, Head of the Office of the President of Ukraine.

During the forum, speakers emphasized the need for sustained support for Ukraine, including granting permission to use Western weapons without restrictions on legitimate targets within the territory of the Russian Federation, developing unmanned systems, and strengthening sanctions against Russia. General Wesley Clark stated that NATO must provide Ukraine with all necessary weapons, including offensive aircraft and tools to liberate Crimea. U.S. Ambassador Bridget Brink noted that Russian aggression also poses a threat to Moldova, Romania, Turkey, and Bulgaria.

As part of the forum, the Ukrainian maritime drone Stalker 5.0 was presented. In addition, a five-meter-long combat sea drone with a range of 600 km was installed in the main assembly hall.

=== Black Sea Security Forum 2025 ===
The second Black Sea Security Forum is scheduled to take place at the end of May 2025 in Odesa. The forum is set to begin on May 30, 2025, as a three-day event. The forum was attended by 650 participants: policymakers, parliamentarians, military leaders, and experts from over 40 countries. The main theme of the event — "The Grand Chessboard. The Middle of the Game" — reflects, according to the organizers, the current stage of geopolitical confrontation in the Black Sea region and beyond. The Forum received extensive media coverage across Ukraine and internationally — and was even mentioned in Russian propaganda shows — underscoring its impact.

Among the key speakers announced for 2025 are:

- British philanthropist Lord Michael Ashcroft
- Former U.S. Secretary of State Mike Pompeo.
- Secretary of State for Defence of the UK (2019 – 2023) Ben Wallace.
- Member of the Parliament of the UK Tom Tugendhat.
- Commander of the Naval Forces of the Ukrainian Navy Vice Admiral Oleksii Neizhpapa.
- Former Prime Minister of Australia Scott Morrison.
- Former U.S. Ambassador to Ukraine (2006–2009) William Taylor.
- Chair of the Foreign Affairs Committee of the Estonian Parliament Marko Mihkelson.
- Director of the Eurasia Center at the Atlantic Council John Herbst.
