= Pensions in Romania =

Pensions in the country of Romania

Pensions in Romania (Romanian: pensie pentru limită de vârstă) are old-age pensions that are granted to people in Romania who have reached the standard retirement age and have completed the minimum period of contribution to the public pension system.

Early retirement pensions (pensie anticipată) may be granted, up to five years before the standard retirement age, to persons who have completed a contribution period that is at least eight years longer than the full contribution period. Partial early retirement pensions (pensie anticipată parțială) may be granted up to five years before the standard retirement age to persons who have completed the full contribution period, as well as persons who have exceeded the full contribution period by up to eight years.

To receive an old-age pension, a person must have reached the standard retirement age and must have contributed to the public pension system for a certain minimum period. As of 1 January 2019, the standard retirement age for women is 61 years and will increase gradually to 63 years by January 2030. The standard retirement age for men is 65 years. The minimum contribution period is 15 years for both women and men. The full contribution period for women is 31 years and will increase gradually to 35 years by January 2030. The full contribution period for men is 35 years.

In the public pension system, the amount of old-age pension is calculated on the basis of the contribution period achieved along with the applicant's career, the level of income that was used to calculate social insurance contributions, and the value of a pension point. Since 1 September 2019 the value of a pension point is 1265 Romanian lei.
