= Mihai Enache =

Romanian politician (born 1988)

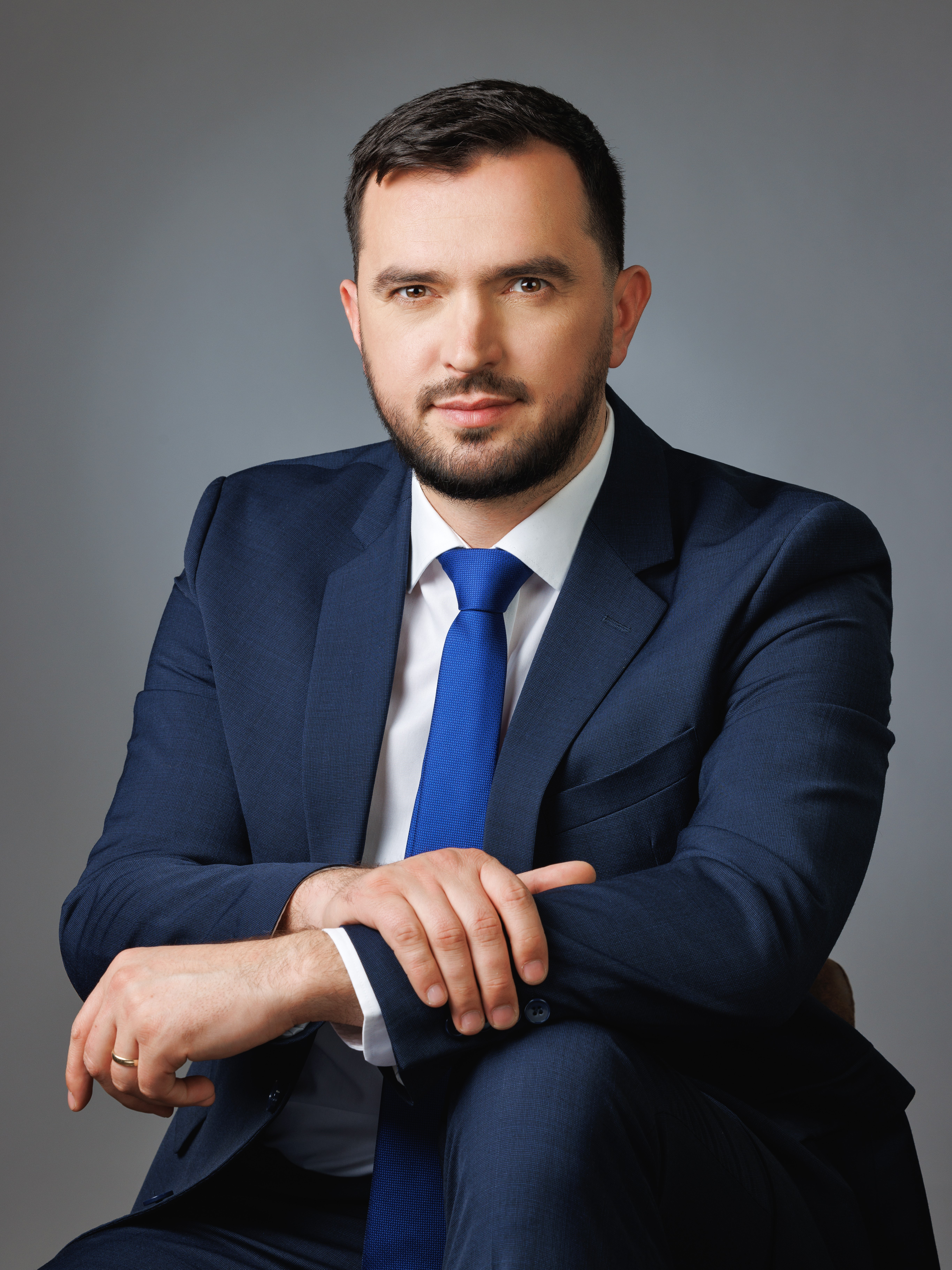
- Enache in 2024

Member of the Chamber of Deputies
- Incumbent
- Assumed office 21 December 2024
- Constituency: Bucharest

Personal details
- Born: 28 September 1988 (age 37) Bucharest, Romania
- Party: Alliance for the Union of Romanians

Mihai-Adrian Enache (born 28 September 1988) is a Romanian politician who since 2024 has been a member of the Chamber of Deputies for the Alliance for the Union of Romanians (AUR).

== Political career ==
On 10 October 2023, the AUR party announced Enache as its candidate for General Mayor of Bucharest for the 2024 Romanian local elections on 9 June. Until March 2024, he held the position of executive director of the Development Department within the Sector 4 City Hall. Enache had previously worked in the local administration and within the city halls of sectors 3 and 5. In the election, Enache obtained three per cent, while Nicușor Dan won the mayorship.

=== Member of the Chamber of Deputies (2024–present) ===
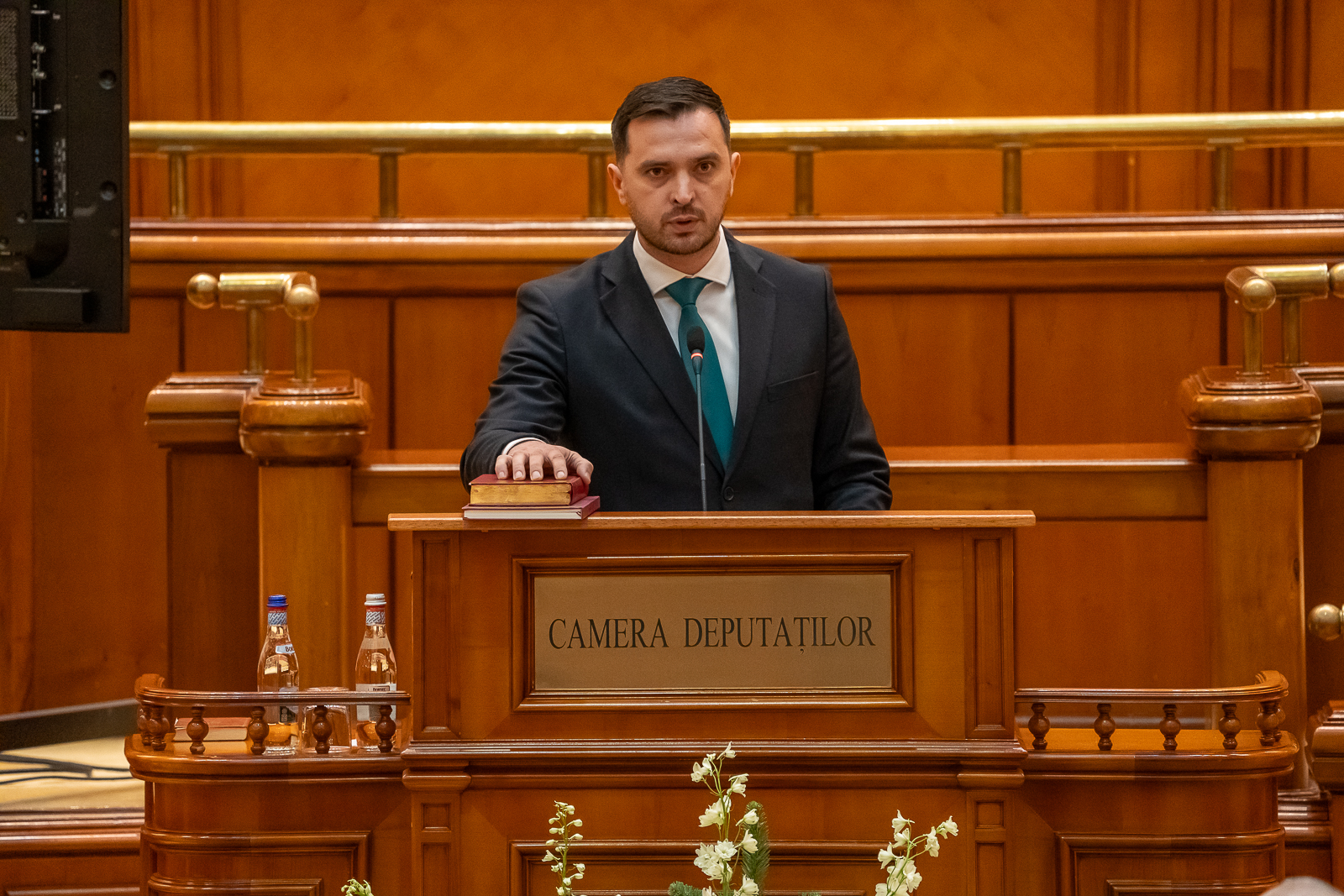
Enache taking the oath of office on 21 December 2024

In the 2024 Romanian parliamentary election on 1 December, Enache was elected a member of the Chamber of Deputies for Bucharest. In the Chamber of Deputies, he holds the position of leader of the AUR parliamentary group and is a member of the Committee for Public Administration and Spatial Planning. He is also part of the Parliamentary Friendship Group with South Africa. Since taking office, Enache has served as leader of AUR Chamber of Deputies group.

== See also ==
- Legislatura 2024-2028 (Camera Deputaților)
- Parliament of Romania
