= Water privatization in Bucharest =

The water and sewer system of Bucharest (Bucuresti in Romanian), the capital of Romania with a population of 2.3 million, was privatized in 2000 through a 25-year concession to the French company Veolia. The impact of the concession is mixed. During the first years almost 3,000 employees were laid off and water bills increased four-fold. There were improvements in service quality and efficiency, but most of the improvements occurred before privatization and improvements in service quality since privatization are not well documented. Privatization placed the burden of financing the renewal of the infrastructure directly on water consumers rather than on taxpayers. The private water utility owned by Veolia, Apa Nova București (Bucharest New Water), is considered one of the most profitable Romanian utilities.

== Situation before privatization ==
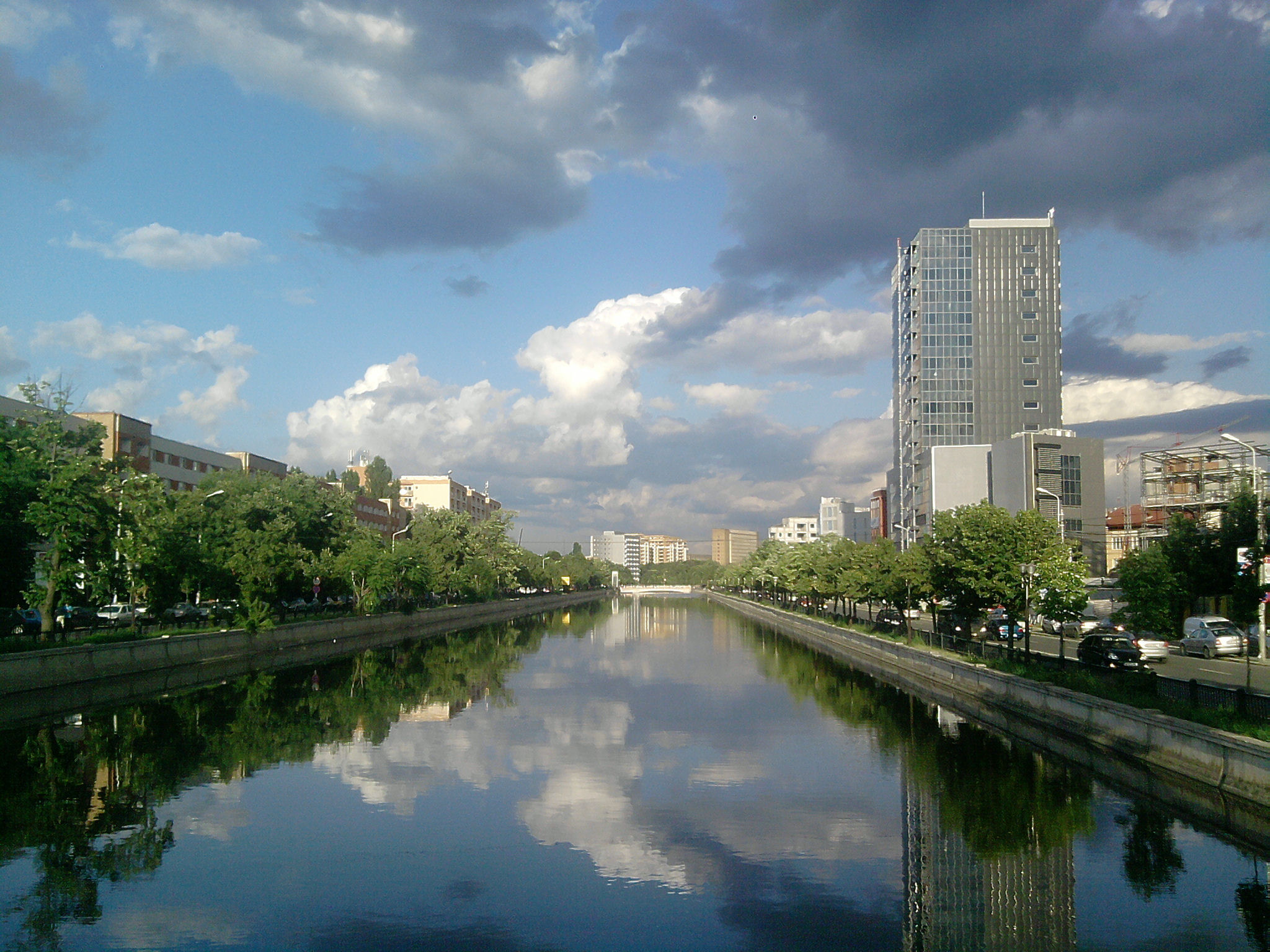
View of Bucharest and the Dâmbovița River.

Various reports paint contrasting pictures of the situation before privatization. A publicly available internal technical report by the World Bank before privatization and a World Bank publication written for public dissemination after privatization differ in their assessment of when improvements occurred. According to the paper for the wider public, before privatization "water supply was intermittent, pressure was low, quality fell short of standards, and there were outbreaks of waterborne disease." According to the internal report, performance improved substantially between 1996 and 1999 before privatization under public management. Reported pressure problems decreased by 30 percent, complaints decreased by 20 percent, billing efficiency (the share of bills collected of the bills issued) increased from 80 to 92 percent, the share of metered residential connections increased from 50 to 91 percent, water availability increased from 12 hours to close to 24 hours per day, specific energy consumption decreased by 25 percent, and water losses – or more precisely non-revenue water – decreased from 45 to 35 percent, all before the privatization. The World Bank had supported the public utility through a US$25 million loan and evaluated the outcome of its project as satisfactory.

However, according to some estimates the system still needed more than US$1 billion in investment. Neither the municipality nor the national government was able to finance an investment of this size.

== Prelude to privatization ==
In August 1997 the municipal government decided to bring the city's water system under some form of private management and approached the International Finance Corporation (IFC), the private-sector arm of the World Bank Group, for advice. A permanent sale of assets was ruled out by the government. Instead various forms of public-private partnerships were considered, ranging from a short-term lease or management contract with little or no private investment to a long-term concession under which the private operator was to finance all capital investments. Under all options the ownership of the infrastructure was to remain with the municipality. The IFC was paid through a relatively small retainer fee and a success fee. The latter provided an incentive in favor of the concession model. It was to be highest, at US$2.5 million, if the privatization was in the form of a concession, lower if it was in the form of a lease contract, and lowest for management contract. The IFC advised in favor of a concession contract, which was accepted by the municipality. At the time it was also considered whether the service area should be split in two halves, with two contracts to be awarded to separate companies each serving one part of the city. This arrangement had earlier been applied in Paris and in Manila, in order to allow to compare the performance of the operators (benchmarking). In Bucharest the city opted for retaining a single service area. The city also decided that it would retain shares in the new company. It contributed its share through the transfer of its fixed assets. The municipal share in the company is variously quoted as 20 percent or 14 percent, compared to a level of 31 percent that had apparently been envisaged initially.

The decision to privatize was taken by the municipal council with a majority of 51 from 60 votes. In parallel, a public relations campaign was carried out in the media, based on analysis from surveys and focus group discussions, in order to win support for the privatization.

== Tender and contract award ==
The selection of the private operator was carried out by the municipality, not by the national government. Only a single criterion was used to select the winning bidder among six short-listed companies: the lowest average water tariff over the 25-year concession contract. Three bids were received from Veolia (France), Suez Environnement (France) and International Water (UK). The bids were opened and evaluated on the same day in a public meeting in the presence of the media, allowing for a high level of transparency. The tender was won by Veolia which submitted an average tariff of only US$0.17 per cubic meter, with tariffs until year 16 discounted to their present value. This compared to an initial tariff of $0.18 per cubic meter. The water tariff submitted by Veolia was very low compared to other European countries. For example, the water and sewer tariff was seven times lower than in Athens ($1.34 per cubic meter) and more than 20 times lower than in Germany ($3.95 per cubic meter). In March 2000 the concession contract was signed between the municipality and the Veolia subsidiary Apa Nova București.

== Financing ==
Apa Nova received concessionary financing from multilateral and bilateral development banks, including two loans for the new Crivina water treatment plant from the EBRD (EUR 55.4 m) and the German DEG (EUR 18.5m). Veolia also provided EUR 35 million in equity. The bulk of the US$340 million investments in the 2000–2007 period were, however, financed through commercial loans and, indirectly, by customers through the company's retained earnings.

== Regulation and profitability ==
Tariff adjustments compared to what was stipulated in the bid were possible only after the fifth year of the concession. They need approval from the National Regulation Authority for the Public Utilities Community Services, ANRSC. In addition, the contract foresaw the possibility to increase tariffs beyond the contractually foreseen increases, if total water use was more than five percent below water use in the previous year. This stipulation was included to reduce the risk of low water demand. This was considered a substantial risk given the unusually high water production of 800 liter per capita per day – more than six times the level in Germany – at the beginning of the concession.

The contract includes detailed standards for service quality and hefty fines for non-compliance. A performance bond had to be submitted which the municipality could draw if the company failed to pay the fines. Compliance with the 24 service quality indicators specified in the concession contract is controlled by AMRSP, the Municipal Authority for Public Services Regulation.

In 2007 Apa Nova Bucharest was considered one of the most profitable Romanian utilities, working with a 24 percent net margin. In 2006 it doubled its net profits to EUR 24 million compared to 2005. In 2010 the net profit was almost Lei 70 million (EUR 22 million), corresponding to a net profit margin of 17 percent.

== Results ==
The results of the concession after the first eight years were mixed. According to a World Bank paper for wide dissemination that did not quote supporting figures, "water quality improved, supply became continuous and water losses were halved" since privatization in 2000. Actually water supply was already continuous at the beginning of the concession, according to a technical report by the World Bank itself. Also, water losses had already been reduced significantly before the concession had been awarded, according to the same report. While the positive impacts are not well documented, the combined water and wastewater tariff increased six-fold from US$0.18 in 2000 to $1.08 per cubic meter in 2009. The average residential water and sewer bill increased still four-fold, slightly attenuated by a decline in water consumption. The monthly bill increased from 8 Lei ($3.5) in 2000 to 32 Lei ($14) in 2008. Veolia invested $349 million between 2000 and 2008. The government did not have to provide any subsidies, thus relieving the state budget accordingly.

There were massive layoffs from the overstaffed utility during the first three years. Initially the private concessionaire planned to lay off 3,000 of its 4,900 employees. In May 2001, Traian Băsescu, who had become mayor of Bucharest in June 2000, accused Apa Nova of breaching the concession agreement by laying off staff too quickly. While reaffirming his support for privatization he asked that the layoffs should be spread over a longer period in order to allow the city council to absorb the workers. Ultimately, the number of employees was reduced to 1,977 in 2007.

In 2003 the Association of Consumer Protection accused Apa Nova of overbilling, bot being responsive to customer complaints, not investing any funds of its own, and charging customers for the installation of meters although it was the company's obligation to pay for them. Furthermore, the Competition Inspectorate fined Apa Nova because it increased some tariffs without permission and Ioan Radu, the head of the National Regulation Authority for the Public Utilities Community Services, said that "this situation is the best example of how not to privatize a public service".

However, according to Apa Nova there were improvements in efficiency. For example, the quantity of raw water purchased decreased by 50% between 2002 and 2011 as a result of reduced losses and reduced final consumption. Furthermore, total electric power consumption decreased by 70% between 2000 and 2011, both because of reduced water production and improved efficiency. These efficiency gains allowed the company to finance a higher level of investments from its own resources and they made the company more profitable.

In 2007 the company sold 10 percent of the shares to its employees, a measure that had been delayed by several years.

== Addition of wastewater treatment ==
Wastewater in Bucharest is collected together with stormwater in a unitary sewer system. The resulting combined flow was discharged largely untreated into the river downstream of Bucharest until the completion of the Glina wastewater treatment plant in 2011. The plant has been financed by a grant of the EU, loans from the EIB and the EBRD, as well as government funds. The loans were made out to the municipality of Bucharest with a guarantee from the national government. The plant is operated by the private concessionaire Apa Nova since its completion. Apa Nova also took over the operation of the main trunk sewer of the city from the municipality in 2011. The sewer, which runs under the Dambovita river that crosses the city, is heavily deteriorated.

In 2022, the EBRD loaned a water utility firm in Romania €25 million to assist extend and modernize the country's water and wastewater infrastructure and services. The loan will also contribute to the financing of a water loss reduction initiative with a private operator.

The project is meant to link 105 000 people to sewage and wastewater treatment systems and add 38 000 people to the water delivery network in the areas of Constanta, Ialomita, Calarasi, Dambovita, and Brasov. It will also aid in the reduction of plastic pollution discharged into the Black Sea. Improvements to the current infrastructure will cut annual leakage by 16 million m3.
