= Alliance for the Union of Romanians =

Political party in Romania and Moldova

Alliance for the Union of Romanians Alianța pentru Unirea Românilor
- Abbreviation: AUR
- President: George Simion
- President of the Senate of AUR in Romania: Sorin Lavric
- Leader in the Senate of Romania: Petrișor Peiu
- Leader in the Chamber of Deputies: Mihai Enache
- Founders: George Simion; Claudiu Târziu
- Founded: 19 September 2019 (Romania); 27 March 2021 (Moldova)
- Ideology: Conservatism; Christian right; Right-wing populism; Ultranationalism; Revolutionary nationalism; Euroscepticism
- Political position: Far-right
- Religion: Romanian Orthodox Church
- National affiliation: AUR Alliance
- European affiliation: European Conservatives and Reformists Party
- European Parliament group: European Conservatives and Reformists Group
- Colours: Gold
- Slogan: Dreptate pentru România ('Justice for Romania')
- Senate: 30 / 135
- Chamber of Deputies: 62 / 330
- European Parliament: 3 / 33
- Mayors (Romania): 30 / 3,176
- County Councilors (Romania): 159 / 1,340
- Local Council Councilors (Romania): 3,527 / 39,900
- Parliament of Moldova: 0 / 101
- District Presidents (Moldova): 0 / 32

Party flag

Website
- partidulaur.ro

The Alliance for the Union of Romanians (Romanian: Alianța pentru Unirea Românilor, AUR) is a right-wing populist and far-right political party active in Romania, with a branch in the neighbouring Republic of Moldova too. It was founded in 2019 by George Simion and Claudiu Târziu and as of 2026, it is the second-largest party in both chambers of the Parliament of Romania, namely the Senate and the Chamber of Deputies.

The party was founded in order to take part in the 2020 local and parliamentary elections in Romania, its main leader Simion formerly candidating in the 2019 European election in Romania as an independent candidate, failing to obtain a place as he did not receive the required number of votes. Despite almost no success locally, the party unexpectedly obtained 9% of the votes in the parliamentary elections, making it the fourth largest party in the Parliament. Four years later, it obtained 18% of the votes, making it the second largest party.

AUR's manifesto aims for the unification of all Romanians, particularly focusing on the union of Moldova and Romania. The AUR logo itself represents a map of Romania composed of a line depicting the actual border of the country and eight stars that are overextended in the right part as to include Moldova within that border too. George Simion has also been regularly seen in public wearing a pin with the map of the Kingdom of Romania at its 1918–1940 territorial apogee. Due to the promoted actions and speech from its members, the party has been described as conservative, far-right, fascist or neo-fascist (in particular, neo-Legionary), pro-Russian, pro-Israel, and as promoting anti-Hungarian sentiment.

The party has close ties with the Romanian Orthodox Church, and states that its four pillars are family, nation, Christian faith, and liberty.

== History ==
=== Background and founding ===
The Alliance for the Union of Romanians was formally established on 19 September 2019. Later, during the Great Union Day of Romania on 1 December 2019, its leader, George Simion, said the party's aims were to participate in the 2020 Romanian local and legislative elections of the country. Simion had up to this point been a campaigner for the unification of Romania and the Republic of Moldova. The party began as an anti-vaxx movement during the COVID-19 pandemic. Claudiu Târziu, who was co-president of the party along Simion until 27 March 2022, was a member of the Coalition for Family which unsuccessfully campaigned to ban gay marriage through constitutional change in a 2018 referendum.

On 26 June 2020, AUR condemned the disinterest of the Romanian authorities regarding the minority rights of the Romanians in Serbia and Ukraine and declared that it would fully support them once it entered the Romanian Parliament. Two days later, AUR also condemned the 80th anniversary of the annexation of Bessarabia, Northern Bukovina, and the Hertsa region by the Soviet Union, declaring that "it is our obligation to regain our state". By July 2020, AUR counted 22 branches in Europe and North America for the Romanian diaspora. The first of these was established in Wolverhampton, in the United Kingdom. AUR was the only party in Romania that expressed support for Donald Trump in the lead-up to the 2020 United States presidential election.

During the 2020 Romanian local elections on 27 September, AUR won the mayoralty in three towns: Amara, Pufești, and Valea Lungă.

=== Election to Parliament and first legislature (2020–2024) ===
In the 2020 Romanian legislative election, AUR obtained a high percentage of the votes, being called as the "surprise" of Romania. The results also increased the popularity of the party on the Internet. Many members of the Romanian Orthodox Church campaigned for the AUR during the 2020 Romanian legislative election. The party came first among Romanians in Italy, the largest group of the Romanian diaspora, and ran a close second among Romanians in France and Romanians in Spain. It also scored first in Cyprus. AUR's candidate for prime minister was Călin Georgescu, who worked for the United Nations for 17 years. According to a statement released by AUR on 8 December 2020, 15,000 Romanians joined the party in just 24 hours. The party got 47 MPs in the 2020–2024 Romanian legislature.

The party achieved good results in rural areas of Moldavia and Dobruja, areas traditionally dominated by the other big parties. Its most significant percentages were in the counties where the Romanian Orthodox Church has a strong influence and a large number of practicing believers. These are Suceava (14.72%), Botoșani (14.62%), Neamț (14.4%), Constanța (14.2%), and Vrancea (13.43%). The party speculated the new communication channels (social networks) in a similar way to the Greater Romania Party (PRM) of the late 1990s - early 2000s, which used the newspaper "România Mare" (Greater Romania) as a communication channel, reaching high electoral scores. Another example is the People's Party – Dan Diaconescu (PP-DD), which was propelled with the help of the OTV television channel.

Recorder, a Romanian online publisher, argues that the election campaign of AUR has adapted to the rural environment, which lacks modern technology, relying more on messages desired by the masses than on a coherent ideology. In this way, they argue, in addition to a core of supporters who voted for radical messages, there is also the wider category of electorate strictly attracted by populist messages.

On 22 January 2021, Simion announced that the party would officially adhere at European level to the "European Conservatives and Reformists Party" after going on visits in Poland and Brussels, Belgium. Simion announced on 15 March 2021 that the AUR had intentions to start operating in the Republic of Moldova on the occasion of the Day of the Union of Bessarabia with Romania celebrated every 27 March. The party was officially launched, as previously stated, on 27 March 2021, and the elected president of the party was Vlad Bilețchi, a renowned Moldovan unionist. This new section of the AUR in Moldova later participated in the Moldovan snap parliamentary elections of 11 July 2021.

On 2 October 2021, AUR organised a 15,000–20,000 people-strong protest against COVID-19 restrictions at the Victory Square in Bucharest, drawing both national and international attention and being the most attended protest in Romania since the start of the pandemic. On 5 October 2021, a motion of no confidence initiated by AUR, but legally proposed by PSD, was passed with 281 votes, thus dismissing the Cîțu Cabinet.

On 27 March 2022, AUR held its first party congress at the Palace of the Parliament. On it, it was intended to elect the party's president. There were two candidates, Simion and Dănuț Aelenei, AUR deputy in the Constanța County. Aelenei claimed to have nominated himself with the simple intention of showing that AUR was a democratic party and that he did not intend to "expel" Simion from the party, admitting that he was less well-known compared to him. 784 voted for Simion and 38 for Aelenei, making Simion the party's sole president after having previously shared leadership with Târziu, who became president of the party's CNC. In November 2022, Simion met with Israel's ambassador to Romania, Reuven Azar. The encounter drew outrage from some Israelis and diaspora Jews, as AUR is officially boycotted by Israel due to its history of judeophobia. On 29 January 2023, Ramona-Ioana Bruynseels, a former candidate for the Humanist Power Party in the 2019 presidential election, joined AUR.

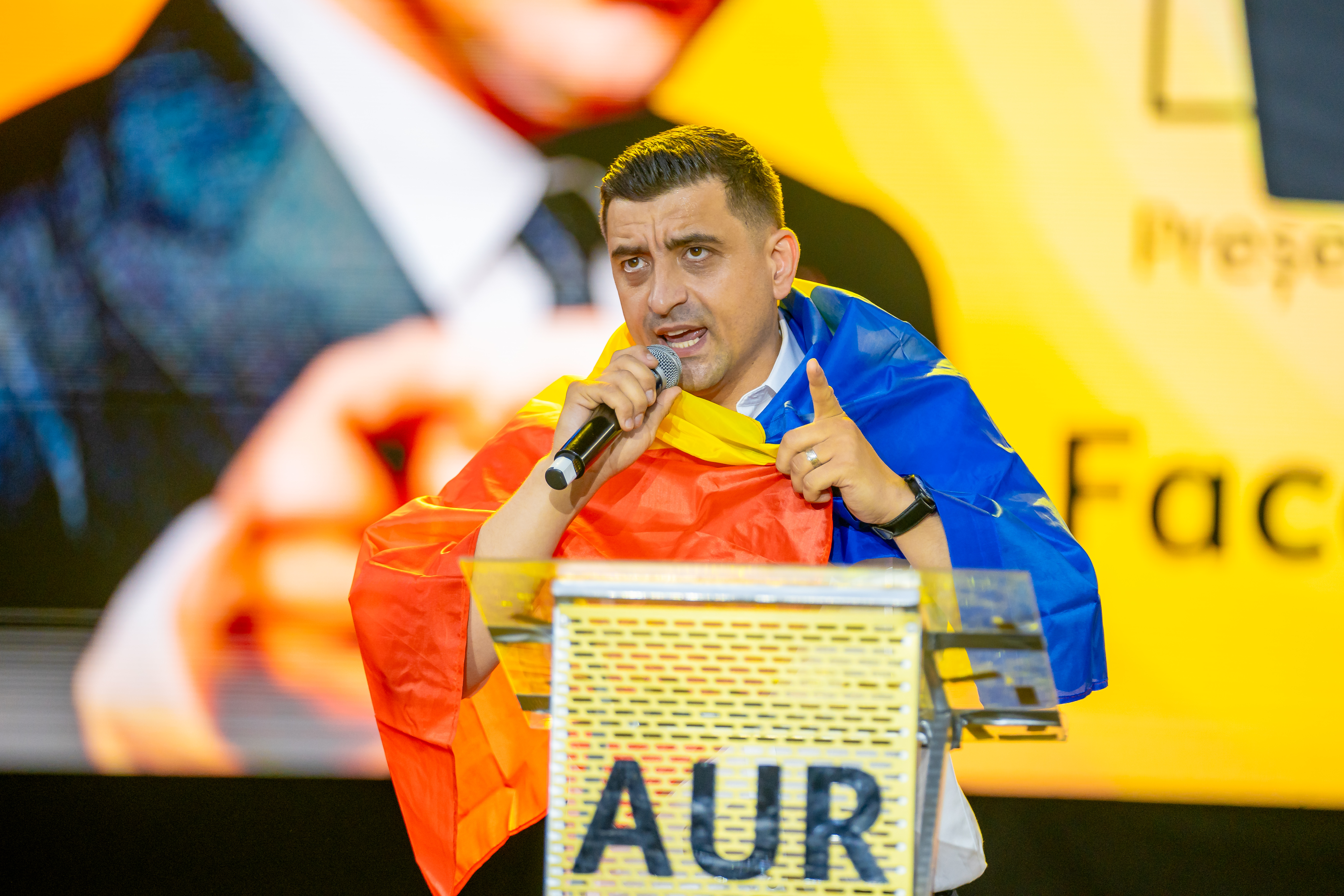
Simion at an AUR rally on 15 June 2024

On 14 November 2023, at an AUR press conference, Lidia Vadim-Tudor (the daughter of the late Corneliu Vadim Tudor), former Minister for Business Environment Ilan Laufer (who is also the president of the National Identity Force), businessman Muhammad Murad, entrepreneur Sorin Constantinescu and Sorin Ilieșiu, as well as deputies Florică Calotă (who was elected on PNL list), Daniel Forea (elected on PSD list), Dumitru Viorel Focșa (elected on AUR, but later left) and senators Ovidiu Iosif Florean (elected on PNL list), Călin Gheorghe Matieș (elected on PSD list) and Vasilică Potecă (elected on PNL list) announced that they are joining AUR for the next election. Later, on 21 November, AUR announced, together with the Romanian Village Party, National Rebirth Alliance, Romanian Republican Party and National Peasants' Alliance the creation of a Sovereigntist Alliance to contest the 2024 Romanian parliamentary election. On 2 April 2024, Mihail Neamțu, former leader of the New Republic party, joined AUR.

In the 2024 European Parliament Election, AUR gained five seats in the EU Parliament, with a total of 6 seats, receiving 14.9% of the total votes. AUR previously held only 1 seat in the European Parliament. In the party's first local elections on 9 June 2024, AUR gained 10.7% for county councils and 9.5% for local councils.

=== Presidential elections and second legislature (2024–present) ===
In the first round of the 2024 Romanian presidential election on 24 November, Simion received 13.9% of the vote, not preceding to the planned runoff on 8 December. However, the runoff was never held as due to accusations of Russian interference in favour of first round winner Călin Georgescu. In the 2024 parliamentary election a week later, AUR received 18% of the vote, becoming the second largest party in both houses of the Romanian Parliament.

The aftermath of the first presidential vote was controversial and led Romania to the brink of a political crisis, with AUR aligning itself with Georgescu, arranging protests in his favour.

Simion won the first round of the 2025 presidential election on 4 May with 41% of the vote, losing the runoff on 18 May to Independent candidate Nicușor Dan with 46.4% against Dan's 53.6%. In early June, geopolitician Dan Dungaciu, lawyer Silvia Uscov and former SOS member Andrei Gușă joined AUR.

On 22 January 2026, Petru Gabriel Negrea, an AUR deputy and a businessman who had offered support to Ukrainian refugees, stated he had been banned from entering Ukraine. He stated that Ukrainian border authorities had verbally informed him that he was considered an "enemy of the Ukrainian people", with him having been detained "in degrading conditions and physically pushed across the border", adding he had been forced to fully undress for a body search, which he described as deliberate humiliation. The deputy attributed this treatment to his public defense of the rights of the ethnic Romanians in Ukraine, and pointed out double standards as Romanian support for Ukraine in the context of the Russo-Ukrainian war took place while the Romanian minority in Ukraine was at the same time being "abandoned" as Negrea described it. AUR stated on 25 January it would submit official requests regarding the case to the Ministry of Foreign Affairs of Romania and the Ukrainian embassy in Romania.

== Ideology ==
The party claims it is a centre-right, patriotic, and Christian democratic party. However, it is described as far-right by third-party sources.

AUR is young as a party, but it didn't come out of nowhere. It brings together some people whose history is linked to the late period of communism. Its candidates are experts in propaganda, intellectuals with more or less open sympathy for legionnaires and legionary or pro-legionary intellectuals, businessmen and itinerant politicians who wander from one radical party to another.

— Oliver Jens Schmitt

According to the party's website, AUR's ultimate goal is to achieve the unification of all Romanians "wherever they are located, in Bucharest, Iași, Timișoara, Cernăuți, Timoc, Voivodina, Italy, or Spain", while wanting to unite Romania and Moldova together, as well as land with Romanian speakers in neighboring countries. The party has been called irredentist.

The party's website names four pillars for the party: family, nation, Christian faith, and liberty. The party characterises its members as "the defenders of the Church". It is opposed to "gender ideology" and believes that a nation has no chance of surviving "unless it cultivates the original pattern of the classic family". The party opposes same-sex marriage, euthanasia and medically-assisted suicide. The AUR wants to introduce an anti-LGBTQ law based on the Hungarian anti-LGBTQ law. The party also opposes abortion.

The party and some of its members have been linked to the Legionary Movement or intellectuals and people who support this ideology and neo-Legionarism.

The party's representatives became popular on social media as a result of their positioning against measures taken by the government during the COVID-19 pandemic. Leading members, such as Șoșoacă (later expelled), gained thousands of followers. AUR has been described as supporting "anti-medicine, anti-vaccination" rhetoric. This accusation was rejected by George Simion, president of AUR, claiming that the party supports the "freedom of choice". The party's manifesto opposes secularism and condemns atheism, and claims that Christians are persecuted in Romania. The party has been critical of the impact of the local autonomy of Hungarians in Romania on the rights of ethnic Romanians in the centre of the country (where the Hungarians are the majority), leading to accusations of being Magyarophobic. The latter accusation was rejected by the president of AUR.

Simion has cited Law and Justice and Fidesz, the ruling parties in Poland and Hungary respectively, as some of his models.

Despite this, AUR has also expressed deep criticism of Fidesz, stating that it would not join the same group in the European Parliament as Fidesz, due to its claims on Romanian territory. However, AUR later reversed its stance, expressing openness to Fidesz joining the European Conservatives and Reformists.

The AUR is Eurosceptic. Dan Tapalaga, the editor of the independent news portal G4 Media, described the AUR in 2023 as, "extremist and anti-Semitic … based on isolationist nationalism, anti-Europeanism, economic nationalism, traditionalism and [Christian] Orthodoxy".

AUR has addressed three issues in Serbia of public interest: Romanian-language education for the Vlachs of the Timok Valley, which the party refers to as Romanians, the church and their right to church services in Romanian, and pollution in the area of the town of Bor. On 24 March 2021, Târziu declared that AUR would oppose Serbia's accession to the European Union over the Vlachs' situation, as "no sort of their rights are respected", "in line with the rights that Romanian citizens of Serbian ethnicity in Romania have". Târziu also stated he had notified the European Commission about this matter. With regards to Kosovo, the party supports the Serbian stance on its political status, considering it to be part of Serbia.

By 2023, the party had become critical of Romanian military support for Ukraine in the Russo-Ukrainian War, suggesting that the war is "not ours". AUR also criticised the transit of Ukrainian agricultural products through Romania, and Simion has been banned from entering Ukraine. Nevertheless, the party leadership is critical of relations with Russia, with Simion calling for the expulsion of the Russian Ambassador and closing Russian consulates in Romania following Russian threats against Romania in December 2023.

AUR takes a strongly pro-Israel stance, supporting the expansion of Israeli settlements in the Palestinian West Bank. Simion has called for Western nations to "stop exporting wars", suggesting that the downfall of the "strong Syrian state" during the Syrian civil war had increased illegal immigration.

AUR wishes to ensure Romania's self-sufficiency in energy, the prosecution of those deemed responsible for mismanaged post-communist privatisation projects, and a fight against illegal logging by banning the export of non-processed wood. The party has a senate seat, which is equivalent to the National Executive Committee of other Romanian parties such as the PSD, the National Liberal Party (PNL), and the Save Romania Union (USR).

== Leadership ==
Nº	Name Born - Died	Portrait	Term start	Term end	Duration
1	George Simion (1986–)		1 December 2019	27 March 2022	2 years, 3 months and 26 days
1	Claudiu Târziu (1973–)		1 December 2019	27 March 2022	2 years, 3 months and 26 days
(1)	George Simion (1986–)		27 March 2022	Incumbent	4 years, 7 months and 18 days

== Electoral history ==
=== Legislative elections - Chamber of Deputies ===
Election	Party leader	Performance					Rank	Government
Election	Party leader	Votes	%	± pp	Seats	+/–	Rank	Government
2020	George Simion Claudiu Târziu	535,828	9.08	New	33 / 330	New	4th	
2024	George Simion	1,665,143	18.01	▲8.93	63 / 331	▲30	▲2nd	

=== Legislative elections - Senate of Romania ===
Election	Party leader	Performance					Rank	Government
Election	Party leader	Votes	%	± pp	Seats	+/–	Rank	Government
2020	George Simion Claudiu Târziu	541,935	9.17	New	14 / 136	New	4th	
2024	George Simion	1,694,705	18.30	▲9.13	28 / 136	▲30	▲2nd	

==== Local elections ====
===== National results =====
Election	County Councilors (CJ)			Mayors			Local Councilors (CL)			Popular vote	%	Position
Election	Votes	%	Seats	Votes	%	Seats	Votes	%	Seats	Popular vote	%	Position
2020	71,022	0.99	0 / 1,340	26,596	0.33	3 / 3,176	35,797	0.45	79 / 39,900	71,022	0.99	12th
2024	843,734	10.70	159 / 1,340	549.306	6.26	30 / 3,176	829,365	9.53	3,527 / 39,739	843,734	10.70	3rd (within AUR Alliance)

===== Mayor of Bucharest =====
Election	Candidate	First round		
Election	Candidate	Votes	Percentage	Position
2020	Claudiu Târziu	4,445	0.67%	7th
2024	Mihai Enache	22,209	3.04%	5th

=== Presidential elections ===
Election	Candidate	First round			Second round		
Election	Candidate	Votes	Percentage	Position	Votes	Percentage	Position
2024	George Simion	1,281,325	13.86%	4th	not qualified		
2024	Călin Georgescu (Note: Independent candidate endorsed by AUR in the second round, which was ultimately not held.)	not endorsed			election annulled		
2025	George Simion	3,862,761	40.96%	1st	5,339,053	46.40%	2nd

=== European Parliament elections ===
Election	Votes	%	MEPs	Position	EU Party	EP Group
2024	1,334,905	14.93	5 / 33	2nd (within AUR Alliance) (Note: AUR Alliance members: AUR (5 MEPs), PNRC (1 MEP) and the other party members did not achieved any mandates (ARN, PRR and BUN).)	ECR	ECR

=== AUR (Republic of Moldova) ===
==== Legislative elections ====
Election	Parliament			Position	Aftermath
Election	Votes	%	Seats	Position	Aftermath
2021	7,216	0.49	0 / 101	10th	Extra-parliamentary
2025	1,603	0.10	0 / 101	15th	Extra-parliamentary

== See also ==
- Romanian Nationhood Party
- List of political parties in Romania
- Politics of Moldova
- Politics of Romania
