= Călin Georgescu =

Romanian politician (born 1962)

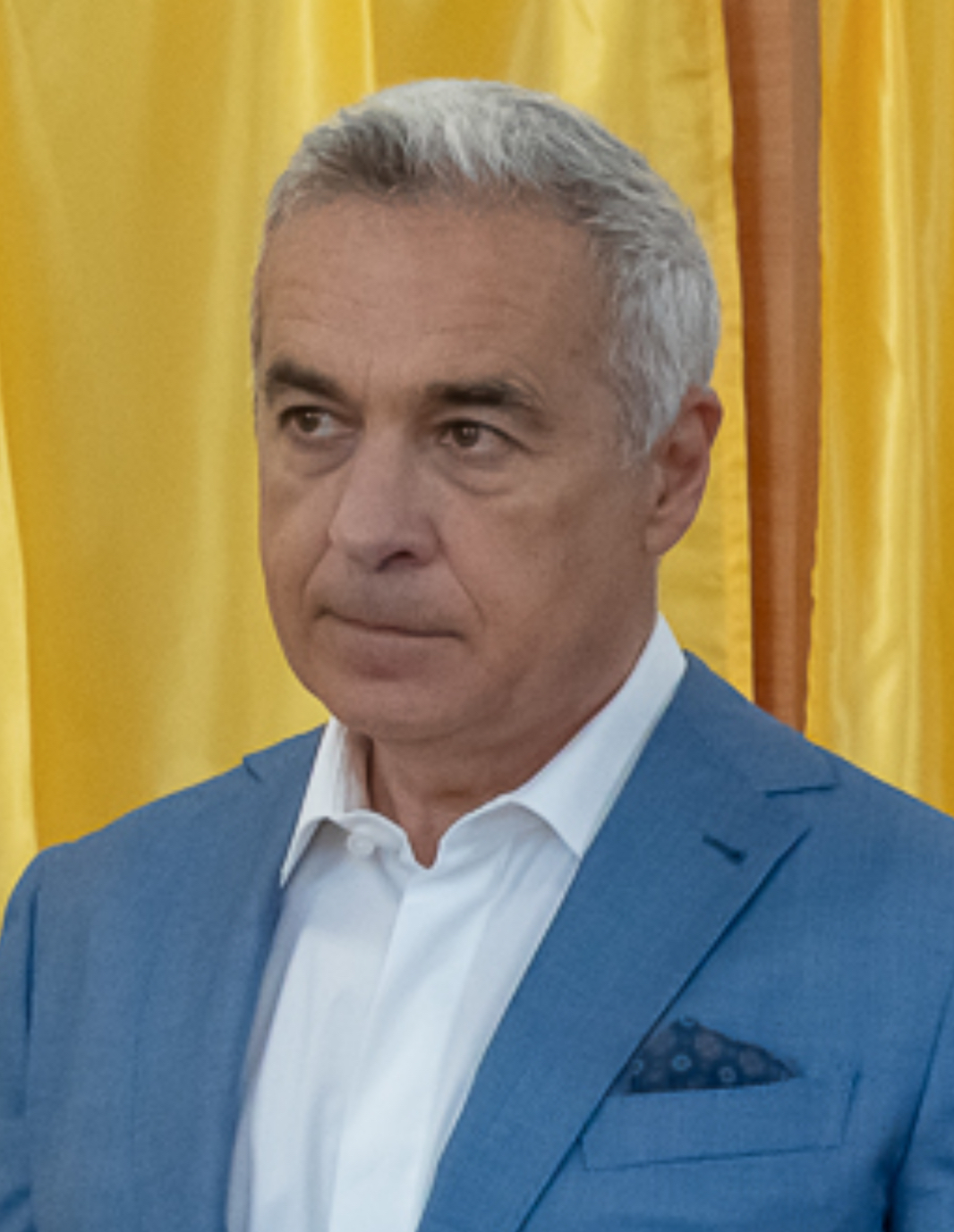
- Georgescu in 2025

President of the European Research Centre for the Club of Rome
- In office 2013–2015

Special Rapporteur in the Office of the United Nations High Commissioner for Human Rights
- In office 2010–2012

Personal details
- Born: 26 March 1962 (age 64) Bucharest, Romania
- Party: Independent (since 2022)
- Other political affiliations: AUR (2020–2022); MER (1990–1992)
- Education: University of Agronomic Sciences and Veterinary Medicine of Bucharest
- Occupation: Politician; agronomist

Călin Georgescu (Romanian: [kəˈlin dʒe̯orˈdʒesku]; born 26 March 1962) is a Romanian politician and agronomist. He has long worked in the field of sustainable development, and served as President of the European Research Centre for the Club of Rome (2013–2015).

Georgescu ran as an independent candidate in the 2024 Romanian presidential election; his views have been described as pro-Russian, anti-NATO, and far-right, and he has been described as a right-wing populist, ultranationalist, and conspiracy theorist. He peddled anti-capitalism. Initially polling at approximately 5%, Georgescu's support surged during the campaign, and he ultimately received 23% of the vote, finishing first in the initial round.

Following the election, the Romanian security services alleged that Georgescu's campaign had utilized over €1 million in undeclared funds and that the election infrastructure had been subjected to cyber-attacks believed to originate from "a state actor". Based on these allegations, the Constitutional Court of Romania annulled the results of the first round on 6 December.

On 26 February 2025, Georgescu was detained by police and charged with several offenses, including "incitement to actions against the constitutional order." Authorities also imposed a 60-day ban on his media appearances. Georgescu subsequently filed his candidacy for the 2025 Romanian presidential election, but was barred from running by the Central Electoral Bureau on 9 March. At the time of his exclusion, Georgescu was leading in public opinion polls. Nicușor Dan was ultimately elected president.

== Early life and education ==
Georgescu was born on 26 March 1962 in the Cotroceni neighborhood of Bucharest, the son of Scarlat Georgescu and Aneta Georgescu, née Popescu. He graduated in 1986 from the Nicolae Bălcescu Institute of Agronomy in Bucharest and obtained his Ph.D. in pedology from the same institute in 1999.

== Diplomatic career ==
In 1991, Georgescu became head of the Office for the Environment of the Romanian Parliament. In 1992, he became an adviser to the then Minister of Environment Marcian Bleahu. He was Secretary General in the Ministry of Environment from 1997 to 1998.

Georgescu acted as the executive director of the National Centre for Sustainable Development in Bucharest from 2000 to 2013, during which time he coordinated the development of two versions of the National Sustainable Development Strategy, in line with the guidelines of the European Strategy for Sustainable Development. He was President of the European Research Centre for the Club of Rome from 2013 to 2015 and the Executive Director of the UN Global Sustainable Index Institute Foundation in Geneva and Vaduz from 2015 to 2016.

Georgescu has worked as the UN Special Rapporteur for human rights and hazardous waste, and represented Romania on the national committee of the United Nations Environment Programme.

== Political career ==
Georgescu was proposed as prime minister by the Alliance for the Union of Romanians in 2020 and 2021. Georgescu ran for president in the 2024 Romanian presidential election. Among his campaign stances were strengthening Romania's defence capabilities, diversifying Romania's diplomatic relations, increasing support for farmers, promoting energy and food production, and reducing dependency on imports. He obtained the most votes at 22.95% in the first round of voting on 24 November, and advanced to a runoff scheduled on 8 December along with Elena Lasconi.

On 6 December 2024, the Constitutional Court of Romania cancelled the presidential elections, which will have to be rescheduled for a later date. The court did not provide a reason for the cancellation. Russia's meddling with the Romanian elections has been mentioned as the foremost reason. Georgescu filed an appeal in the European Court of Human Rights against the cancellation, which the ECHR rejected on 21 January 2025, saying that it did not have jurisdiction over the elections. (Note: ECHR enforces "personal human rights". Since there was no imminent and irreparable danger to Mr. Georgescu's human rights, ECHR does not prioritize his case. ECHR cannot rule over the results of Romanian elections.)

On 6 March 2025, Georgescu definitively lost the trial at ECHR. ECHR has motivated that only elections for legislative bodies are covered by human rights stipulations, elections for the president are not. Also, there was no evidence of having had an unfair trial. ECHR mentioned that ECHR is not subservient to the European Union.

=== Political views ===
In November 2020, Georgescu stated that dictator Ion Antonescu and Iron Guard founder Corneliu Zelea Codreanu are heroes through whom "the national history lived, through them speaks and spoke the national history and not through the lackeys of the globalist powers that lead Romania today temporarily". He has also said that the Romanian revolution was used by the West to steal Romanian resources, and has multiple times promoted COVID-19 misinformation.

In November 2024, he spoke with Israeli Diaspora Affairs Minister Amichai Chikli. Georgescu said that if elected, he would fight antisemitism, move the Romanian embassy in Israel to Jerusalem, invite Israeli Prime Minister Benjamin Netanyahu to Bucharest, and ignore the International Criminal Court's arrest warrant for Netanyahu, despite Romania being a state party to the Rome Statute. Romania accused Israel of interfering in the 2024 Romanian presidential election in favor of Georgescu. On 2 December 2024, the Jewish News Syndicate characterized Georgescu as "—a little-known antisemitic, Holocaust-denying, pro-Russia candidate—projected to win a runoff election for prime minister amid allegations of Russian meddling". Haaretz does not see Georgescu as a friend of the Jews.

On 6 December, the Romanian Constitutional Court unanimously annulled the presidential election process due to additional "aggressive hybrid Russian attacks" favoring Georgescu.

Georgescu has stated that he favors Romania's geopolitical non-alignment between the two power blocs. He denied being an extremist or a fascist, saying, "We remain directly linked to European values, but we must find our (own) values." He spoke about supporting Romanian farmers, traditional values, the Romanian Orthodox Church, and Romania's energy and agricultural self-sufficiency. He said that Romania would respect its commitments to the EU and NATO, but only "to the extent that they will respect theirs" toward Romania. He criticised Romania's dependence on international companies in sectors such as food, water, and energy. Georgescu accused the arms industry in the United States of fueling the Russo-Ukrainian War, but claimed that, "For me and my people, the most important is the partnership with America." He supported Donald Trump's efforts to end the war in Ukraine through negotiations.

Several media articles criticized Georgescu for his pro-Russian statements, describing him as a Russophile and demonstrating how he used his social media platforms to spread information sourced to Russian state media. This also resulted in him leaving the AUR in 2022. Georgescu also criticised the European Union and NATO, and in a 2021 interview, he described the latter's ballistic missile defense shield in Deveselu as a "shame of diplomacy", and called it a "disgrace". He has also praised Russian president Vladimir Putin as "a man who loves his country." Moreover, he stated that he wanted to engage with, rather than challenge, Russia, because "Security comes from dialogue, not confrontation." Speaking of the war in Donbas that began in 2014, Georgescu said in 2021: "The situation in Ukraine is clearly manipulated, with the goal of provoking a conflict destined to financially help the military–industrial complex of the USA." Georgescu has also pledged to end military aid to Ukraine if he is elected president. Additionally, he described Ukraine as a fictional state, while suggesting that Romania could annex Ukrainian territories, precisely Northern Bukovina, Budjak, and Northern Maramureș. Georgescu also describes himself as "ultra pro" US President Donald Trump.

Georgescu does not believe in the human Moon landing. In a podcast, he also mentioned that carbonated juices contain nanochips, which "enter you like into a laptop". Georgescu promoted conspiracy theories and pseudoscientific claims such as chemotherapy and vaccines are part of a profit-making "establishment" and a "crime against their peers", water is not H_{2}O and has its own memory that can influence the human body, C-section births break the divine thread of the child, and other alternative medicine, and healthcare "solutions". Georgescu considers climate change "a global scam", which "has nothing to do with reality", and that he's met another species that's "in no way human".

In his 14 February 2025 Munich Security Conference Address, US Vice President JD Vance singled out Romania's Constitutional Court's annulment decision on their most recent presidential election as one of several examples of Europe's refusal to adhere to America's most current democratic principles.

Political scientist Elena Trifan compared Georgescu's rhetoric to Donald Trump and Narendra Modi, arguing that he frames his country's challenges as "moral and spiritual dilemmas rather than structural issues." Academic Ștefan Baghiu, analysing Georgescu's campaign theatrics for social media, suggests that Georgescu promotes "a neo-legionary blend of Christian mysticism and New Age philosophy." Many other media outlets agree that he promoted New Age theories. Furthermore, researchers Sergiu Bortoș and Constantin C. Lupașcu characterize his approach as a form of "sacred populism," arguing that he merges Christian motifs with esoteric imaginaries on digital platforms to construct a quasi-messianic persona. Nucu Morar suggested that Georgescu should be excommunicated.

Mr. Georgescu is an Eastern Orthodox Christian. He participated, for example, in the Holy Mass celebrated by His Holiness Laurențiu Streza, who administered Holy Communion to him and his wife. Gigi Becali has strong doubts about Georgescu's orthodoxy.

He advocates the nationalization of all foreign-owned businesses in Romania. Economist Eugen Rădulescu argued Georgescu's proposals would transform Romania into the "North Korea of Europe" and "set the economy back 20 years." Baghiu concludes that Georgescu has "an incoherent, yet systematic opposition to capitalism".

=== TikTok scandal ===
Georgescu's campaign utilized social media, particularly TikTok, where his videos had more than 52 million views in a four-day period and attracted the attention of younger voters. The Romanian Supreme Council of National Defence stated that TikTok had given Georgescu "preferential treatment," leading to his "massive exposure". TikTok said Georgescu was treated the same as other candidates and "was subject to exactly the same rules and restrictions."

On 4 December 2024, Romanian president Klaus Iohannis declassified and published Romanian intelligence agency documents, which stated that Georgescu's growth was "not organic" and was funded and coordinated by a "state actor". Iohannis declassified the documents at the request of the intelligence agencies. The documents said that Georgescu's advertising campaign slogan "Balance and uprightness" (Note: Also translated as "Balance and integrity" or "Stability and integrity".) was in its methodology identical to an earlier TikTok campaign slogan "Brother near brother" purchased by Russian actors and targeting Ukraine. Romanian media said that the person who funded the Georgescu campaign was a right-wing supporter named Eugen Sechila. The documents said that the campaign was coordinated through Telegram and Discord channels, where advice was given to participants on how to bypass TikTok security mechanisms, avoid geoblocking, and bans for comment spam. One involved account, "bogpr", identified as registered for a Romanian citizen, Bogdan Peșchir, made donations to other TikTok accounts of over €1 million, including €381,000 to accounts directly involved in promoting Georgescu's campaign. The South African advertising company FA Agency contacted numerous TikTok influencers and offered €1,000 for promoting Georgescu's videos. In total, over 25,000 accounts were involved in promoting these videos. TikTok banned 27,000 fake accounts run by a third-party "fake engagement vendor" that promoted Georgescu and the AUR. The Constitutional Court of Romania annulled the results of the election on 6 December. It did not provide a reason for the cancellation. Georgescu's opponent, Elena Lasconi, said, "The constitutional court's decision is illegal, amoral, and crushes the very essence of democracy, voting."

The Romanian investigative outlet Snoop wrote that the "Balance and uprightness" campaign on TikTok was funded by the National Liberal Party, which hired the Romanian firm Kensington Communication to run the campaign. Kensington Communications sent a script to 130 influencers for use through a newly established platform called FameUp. Although the hashtag was changed from "Balance and seriousness" to "Balance and uprightness" (the firm Kensington Communication claims it was done without consulting them), the influencers still followed the script given to them. Then, at least some of these influencers added "Călin Georgescu" in the comments – in effect, lending their support to Georgescu.

Georgescu reported his own income during the electoral campaign as 0 euros, and his campaign spending as 0 euros (all candidates have to fill mandatory reports of their income and campaign spending). Romanian businessman Dan Șucu estimated the cost of Georgescu's electoral campaign at €50 million.

He received the nickname "TikTok Messiah" or "Ultranationalist Messiah".

=== Detention and investigation ===
On 26 February 2025, Romanian prosecutors launched a criminal investigation into Georgescu for various alleged offenses, including campaign funding abuses, support of fascist groups, and "incitement to actions against the constitutional order". The same day, Georgescu was detained by police as he was on his way to register his candidacy for the 2025 presidential election. His questioning coincided with police searches at 47 home addresses, according to the General Prosecutor's Office. Georgescu denied all wrongdoing and stated authorities were "looking to invent evidence to justify stealing the election and to do anything in their efforts to block a new candidacy from me." Romanian Prime Minister Marcel Ciolacu of the Social Democratic Party stated on social media that "the judiciary is independent and the law must be applied regardless of persons."

Prosecutors ordered Georgescu not to appear in the media or create any new social media accounts for the next 60 days. These bans were set to expire one week before the 4 May 2025 presidential election.

The investigation established that Georgescu's security team was primarily composed of mercenaries who fought alongside the Wagner Group, most notably Horațiu Potra, Marin Burcea, Eugen Sechila, and Dorina Mihai. All had links to Wagner and the Akhmat Kadyrov Regiment.

Georgescu takes no income, and his wife's company declared an income of 2.000 Lei (€400) per month. The couple and their children inhabit an expensive villa, valued at €500,000, and he used to have a driver and bodyguards, who were paid at least €500 a day. According to the last available overview, the couple earned about 2100 Lei (€420) per month as of 2024, and 1525 Lei (€305) per month as of 2025. His wife said they previously (more than 10 years ago) had huge salaries and bonuses, so they have saved a lot of money.

=== 2025 presidential campaign and disqualification ===
On 7 March 2025, Georgescu filed his candidacy for the 2025 presidential election. On 9 March, Romania's Central Electoral Bureau (BEC) rejected Georgescu's candidacy, the official reason being that a foreign power (identified as Russia) meddled with Romanian elections. At the time of his disqualification, Georgescu was leading opinion polls with about 40% of the first round vote. The BEC referenced the Constitutional Court's annulling of the 2024 election in its decision. Georgescu appealed the decision; however, on 11 March 2025, the Constitutional Court upheld the Central Electoral Bureau's decision. On 26 May, Georgescu announced his retirement from politics.

=== Aftermath ===
On 16 September 2025, Georgescu and 21 others were charged with plotting a coup following the annulment of the 2024 election. He and some others are also being investigated as part of a €1.1 million fraud case. Georgescu claimed he was being prosecuted by the "Globalist-Sorosist Oligarchy" and that "forces from Western Europe" had sought to assassinate him. Georgescu stands accused of creating an organization seeking to kill Jews, foreigners, politicians, and judges.

In September 2026, Georgescu was arrested in an investigation about the 1.1 million Euro swindle. According to the charges, Georgescu c.s. asked for money as a security deposit from a businessman, so that the businessman obtains an investment of 6 million Euro. Subsequently, the promised amount got inflated to 15 million Euro. Those 6 or 15 million Euro never materialized and the businessman was soothed with fake documents. Subsequently, the political party AUR organized a protest about the arrest inside the Romanian Parliament. Georgescu owned a fake ID attributed to the Sovereign Military Order of Malta. Theodor Baconschi commented that it demotes Georgescu from "grand spy" to "gross swindler". Later, Georgescu was placed under supervised release. According to the taps, Georgescu planned to flee to Italy, he was planning to buy a 1.2 million Euro villa in Tuscany, paid by others (foreigners). His villa from Mogoșoaia has been seized on paper as warranty. As of 7 October 2026, the villa remains seized.

He has been described as a Teflon politician: his voters hate Police, Justice, and mainstream media, so his penal prosecution makes him their hero. As of 29 September 2026, Georgescu is for 30 days under provisional arrest. According to Cristian Tudor Popescu, George Simion, the leader of AUR, plays a cynical game: he publicly supports Georgescu in order to gather votes from Georgescu's voters, but his real desire is that Georgescu will remain in jail for a long time. That is, Simion gains political capital by organizing protests against the arrest, but he needs that Georgescu remains in jail. According to transcripts of Georgescu's private talks, he does not like Simion, either. Purportedly, Simion made scathing remarks about Georgescu in private talks.

Georgescu was also charged of another scam, of €450,000, or at least mentioned in its investigation as part of a criminal organization. A sociologist commented that not Georgescu himself is the real problem of the Romanian government, but the lack of trust in Romanian Justice. In total, three businessmen filed penal law complaints against Georgescu. The provisional arrest was issued due to the risk of fleeing the country. His wife stated that Georgescu did not scam, but got scammed. His bank accounts have been seized during the investigation.

Bogdan Peșchir was charged with corrupting voters to vote for Georgescu. Silviu Predoiu, former director of the Romanian Foreign Intelligence Service, stated that intelligence services have standards of morality and seriousness, and Georgescu does not meet them, so there is no reason to assume that he works for a secret service. Georgescu also stands accused of attempted tampering with evidence. He is also charged with performing a typical Iron Guard gesture. On 28 October 2026, Georgescu's supporters produced trouble inside the building of the Bucharest Court of Appeals. On the same day, he got another 30 days of provisional arrest. All judges who analyzed the demand for provisional arrest agree that there is a reasonable suspicion that Georgescu committed the crime he stands accused of, even if they disagree upon whether provisional arrest is required. The journalist Andreea Pavel states that he is not a political prisoner. According to Răzvan Filip and others, the route of that one million Euro reveals links to Russia. Gigi Becali stated, "I, for example, was against Georgescu; now I am a fan of Georgescu."

President Nicușor Dan stated that the facts of the annulment of elections will be made public, together with new information about Georgescu's background, but cannot say when that will happen. On 14 November 2026, an unauthorized protest action is taking place in Bucharest; Simion denied he is the organizer of this action.

== Personal life ==
Georgescu is married and has three children. They live in a villa near Bucharest worth €500,000, which Georgescu purchased during the 2024 election campaign. He is a judo practitioner.

== In popular culture ==
Following Georgescu's presidential campaign and public appearances in Romania, a cult of personality began to develop around him.

== Publications ==
- Romania at Crossroads, Editura Logos, București, 2014 and Editura Christiana, 2016 (second revised edition and the country project)
- Pentru un ideal comun [In Search of Common Purpose] (in Romanian). Bucharest: Compania Publishing House. 2012. ISBN 9789731960920. OCLC 809933615.
- "România după criză. Reprofesionalizarea" [Romania After the Crisis. Reshaping Professional Worth], coordinators Mircea Malița and Călin Georgescu, Compania Publishing House, Bucharest, 2010. ISBN 9789731960845. OCLC 826656439
- "Trezirea la realitate" [A Wake-up Call], in România post-criză. Reprofesionalizarea României III [Romania after the Crisis], 3rd IPID Report, Bucharest, 2010, pp. 5–15.
- "Reclădirea capitalului uman" [Rebuilding Human Capital], in Șansa României: oamenii. Reprofesionalizarea României II [A Chance for Romania: Betting on People], 2nd IPID Report, București, 2009, pp. 7–18.
- "Romania at the Eve of the Third Millennium", in Millennium III, special issue on "Which Forces are Driving Europe?, European Conference of the National Associations of the Club of Rome", Bucharest, 23–24 May 2008, pp. 95–103.
- "Reprofesionalizarea României" [Reshaping Professional Worth in Romania], 1st IPID Report, Bucharest, 2008; author and editor.
- National Sustainable Development Strategy of Romania 2013-2020-2030, (available in Romanian and English), Government of Romania, Bucharest, 2008; Project Manager.
- Planurile Locale de Dezvoltare Durabilă "Agenda Locală 21" [Local Sustainable Development Plans under Local Agenda 21], for 40 local authorities, 2000–2008; Project Manager.
- National Sustainable Development Strategy, (available in Romanian and English), United Nations Development Programme, Bucharest, 1999; Project Manager.
- România 2020, co-editor with Mircea Malița et al., Editura Conspress, București, 1998. ISBN 9789739623391. OCLC 895707059
