= Stefan Gelineo =

Serbian physiologist

Stefan Gelineo (17 June 1898 in Stari Grad – 1 October 1971 in Belgrade) was a Serbian physiologist, who by his contributions to the study of hypothermia, garnered an international reputation along with Ivan Đaja, Radoslav Andjus and Vojislav Petrović.

Gelineo was among the earliest research assistants to work with Ivan Đaja. Gelineo is credited with the founding of the Chair for physiology at the Serbian Institute for Physiology, rector of the University of Belgrade, member of the Serbian Academy of Sciences, and a prominent architect of its early 20th-century development.

He was born in 1898 in Stari Grad on the island of Hvar. He studied in Leipzig and Vienna and afterwards taught at Belgrade University and became a member of the Belgrade School of Physiology. He is a follower of the work of Ivan Đaja.

During World War II and occupation of Yugoslavia, he was interned at the Banjica concentration camp.

He died in Belgrade in 1971.

== Selected works ==
Gelineo authored 141 scientific and 14 popular science works. Here are just some:

- Animal heat and its maintenance, 1934.
- New tests of basal metabolism, 1935.
- Adjustment temperature and ground level, 1937.
- Outdoor temperature and heat transfer in warm-blooded organisms, 1941.
- Some interesting animals of Yugoslavia, 19 ??
- Postage stamps with designs from the Yugoslav animal kingdom, 1950.
- The effect of the climate of the Croatian littoral on the respiratory quotient in man, 1952.
- Hemoglobin concentration and oxidation intensity in fish, 1960.
- Oxygen consumption in rats born and adults in different thermal environments, 1960.
- Oxygen consumption in black Dalmatian lizards, 1963 (co-author: A. Gelineo)
- Temperaturadaptation und Sauerstoffverbrauch bei Eidechsen, 1964.
- Development of chemical thermoregulation in field voles Microtus arvalis Pall, 1963.

He published his works in "Proceedings of the Yugoslav Academy of Sciences and Arts", Department of Natural Sciences.
