= Vojislav Petrović =

Serbian academician

Vojislav M. Petrović (1925–2007), was a distinguished Serbian biologist, professor and academician, member of the Serbian Academy of Sciences. Petrović is remembered as a professor of the Institute for Biological Research Department of Endocrinology and Faculty of Sciences-Institute of Physiology and Biochemistry at the University of Belgrade as well as vice-rector and rector of the same institution. But most of all, he is associated with the pioneering work of Ivan Đaja and the next generation of scientists who continued the research in the same field, namely Stefan Gelineo, Radoslav K. Andjus and Vojislav Petrović.

He also wrote books and papers in international scientific publications.

Vojislav Petrović died in Belgrade in 2007.
