= Étienne Lancereaux =

French physician

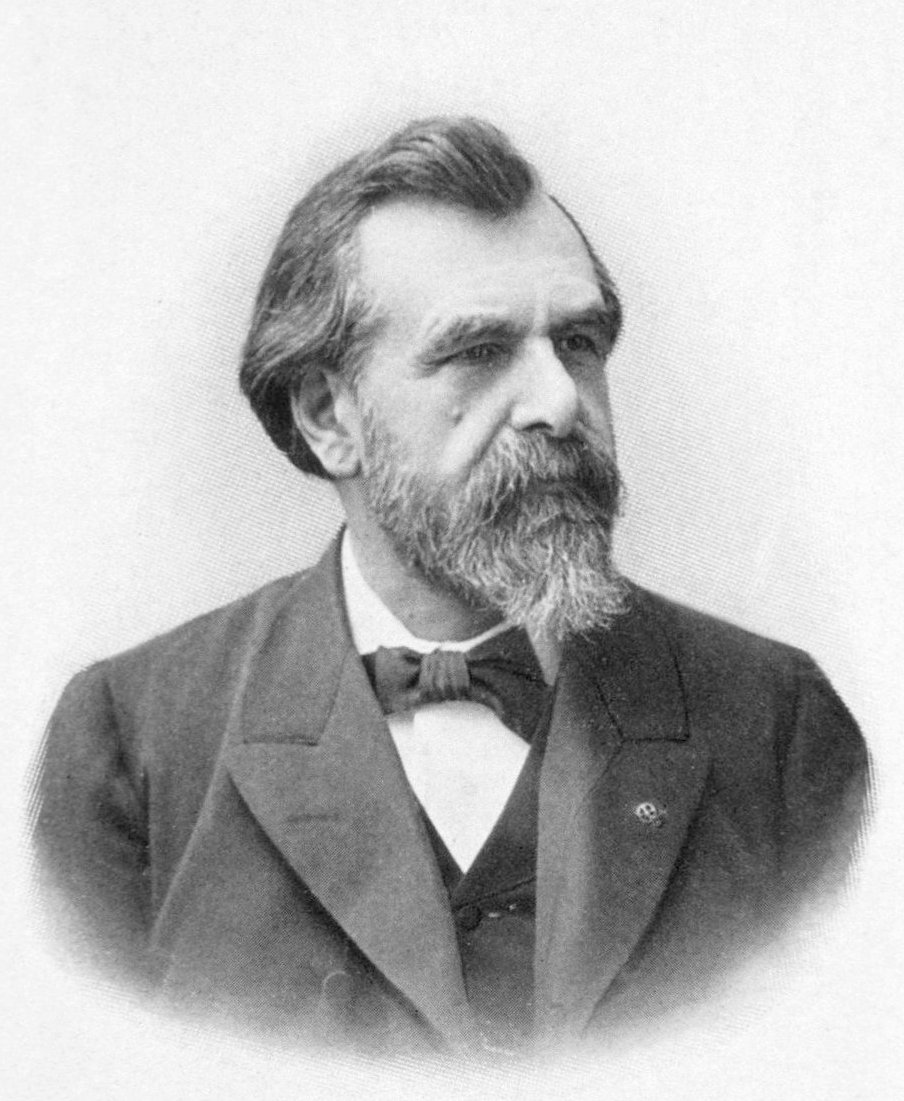
Etienne Lancereaux

Étienne Lancereaux (November 27, 1829 – October 26, 1910) was a French physician born in Brécy-Brières. He is remembered for pioneer contributions made in the understanding of diabetes.

He studied medicine in Reims and Paris, receiving his medical doctorate in 1862. From 1869 he served as médecin des hôpitaux, working in various hospitals in Paris. In 1872 he earned his agrégation, and later in his career, he was appointed president of the Académie Nationale de Médecine. His best known student was Nicolae Paulescu (1869–1931), the discoverer of insulin.

Through clinical-pathological research, Lancereaux believed that the cause of diabetes mellitus was located in the pancreas. In 1877 he published a paper in which he coined the term diabète pancréatique (pancreatic diabetes). His ideas in regards to diabetes were later confirmed through experimentation by Oskar Minkowski (1858–1931) and Josef von Mering (1849–1908). Lancereaux provided distinctions on the two primary forms of diabetes, which he referred to as diabetes maigre ("lean diabetes") and diabetes gras ("fat diabetes").

In addition to diabetes, he also made contributions in his research of alcoholism, syphilis, infectious forms of jaundice and the transmission of typhus by water.

== Associated eponym ==
- "Lancereaux's diabetes": Diabetes mellitus with marked emaciation (cachexia).

== Selected publications ==
- Traité historique et pratique de la syphilis, Paris 1866; translated into English and published as: "A treatise on syphilis, historical and practical" (1868–69).
- Atlas d'anatomie pathologique, 1871; Translation of atlas volume into English and published as: "Atlas of pathological anatomy" (1880).
- Traité d'anatomie pathologique (3 volumes) Paris 1875–1889.
- Traité de l'herpétisme, Paris 1883.
- Traité des maladies du foie et du pancréas, Paris 1899.
- Alcoolisme, Paris 1907.
- Traité de la goutte, Paris 1910.
