= Albert Dastre =

French physiologist

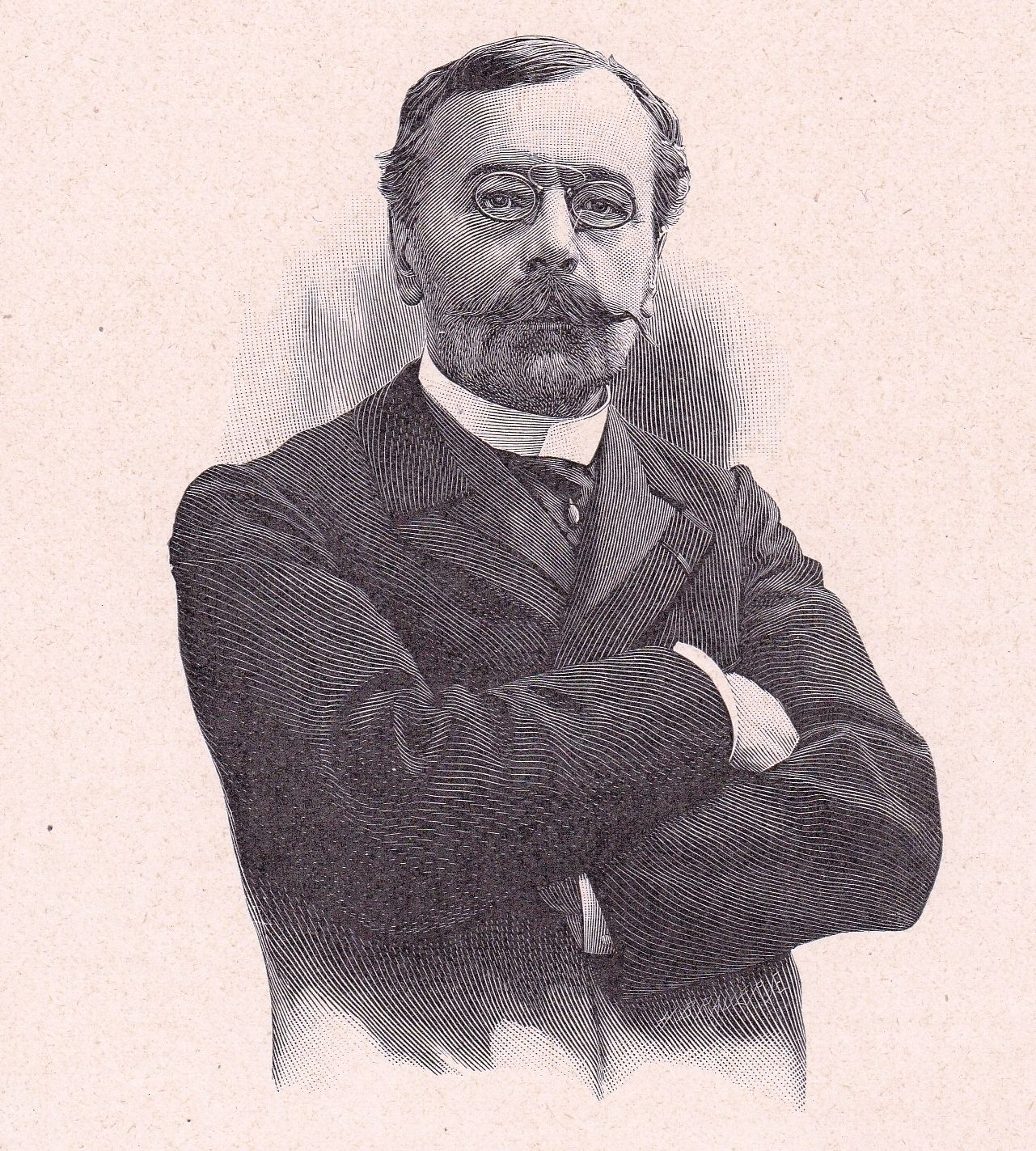
- Picture of Albert Dastre, taken before 1923
- Born: November 7, 1844; Paris, France
- Died: October 22, 1917 (aged 72)
- Occupation: Physiologist
- Scientific career
- Thesis: Recherches sur l'allantoïde et le chorion de quelques mammifères (1876)

Albert Dastre (7 November 1844 – 22 October 1917) was a French physiologist born in Paris.

He studied and worked under Claude Bernard (1813–1878) and Paul Bert (1830–1886) in Paris and attained the chair of general physiology at the Sorbonne in 1886. In 1904, Dastre became a member of the Académie des Sciences. One of his better-known assistants was Romanian physiologist Nicolae Paulescu (1869–1931), who was the discoverer of insulin.

Dastre specialized in the field of physiological chemistry. He is remembered for his studies of glycosuria and diabetes, as well as for his investigations involving the proteolytic properties of blood. In 1893, he introduced the term "fibrinolysis", to define a process involving the spontaneous dissolution of blood clots.

Among his written works was a philosophic and scientific treatise on life and death titled La Vie et la Mort. In 1878–79, he edited and published Leçons sur les Phénomènes de la vie communs aux animaux et aux végétaux, a work composed by his former mentor, Claude Bernard. With his colleague Jean-Pierre Morat (1846–1920), the "Dastre-Morat Law" is derived, a dictum which states that "constriction of the body's surface blood vessels is usually accompanied by dilation of vessels of the viscera, and vice versa".

== Bibliography ==
- Carl W. Hall (2000). Laws and Models. CRC Press. ISBN 0-8493-2018-6.
