= Jean-Pierre Morat =

French physiologist (1846–1920)

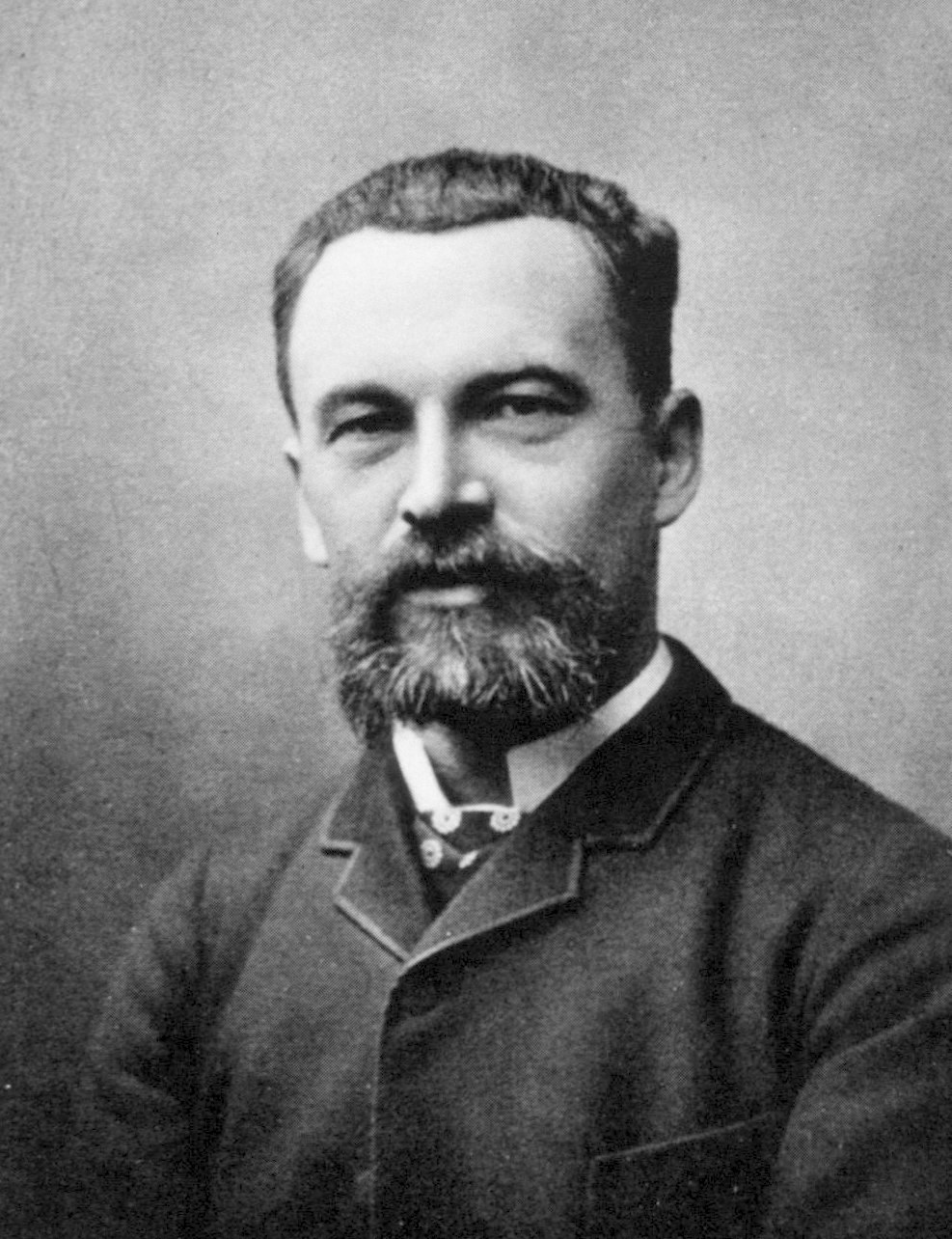
Jean-Pierre Morat (1846–1920)

Jean-Pierre Morat (18 April 1846 – 25 July 1920) was a French physiologist born in Saint-Sorlin, department Saône-et-Loire.

Morat studied medicine at École de médecine de Lyon, traveling to Paris in 1873, where he presented his dissertation-thesis on bone marrow, "Contributions à l’étude de la moelle osseuse". He remained in Paris for three years, working in the laboratory of Claude Bernard (1813–1878), of whom Morat became a devoted disciple. In Paris, he worked closely with veterinarian Henri Toussaint (1847–1890) and physiologist Albert Dastre (1844–1917). With Toussaint, he collaborated on "Les variations de l’état électrique des muscles" (Variations of the electrical state of muscles), and with Dastre, he undertook extensive research of the sympathetic nervous system. With Dastre, the "Dastre-Morat Law" is derived, a dictum which states that "the vasoconstriction of the capillaries of the body surface is usually accompanied by vasodilation of the internal vessels, especially of the viscera, and vice-versa".

Following his years spent in Paris, Morat became an instructor of physiology at the faculty of medicine in Lille. In 1882, he was appointed professor of physiology at the faculty of medicine in Lyon, a position he maintained until his retirement in 1916. In 1883, he was admitted to the Société de biologie, and in 1904 was elected as a correspondent to the Académie de Médecine. In 1916, he became a correspondent of the Académie des sciences.

Morat had a keen interest in the field of surgery, being credited for introducing a process of administering morphine and atropine to a patient prior to the administration of anesthesia. Among his better-known writings was the six-volume"Traité de physiologie" (1904), a work that was co-written with a former student of his, Maurice Doyon (1869–1934).
