= Nicolae Paulescu =

Romanian physiologist and politician (1869–1931)

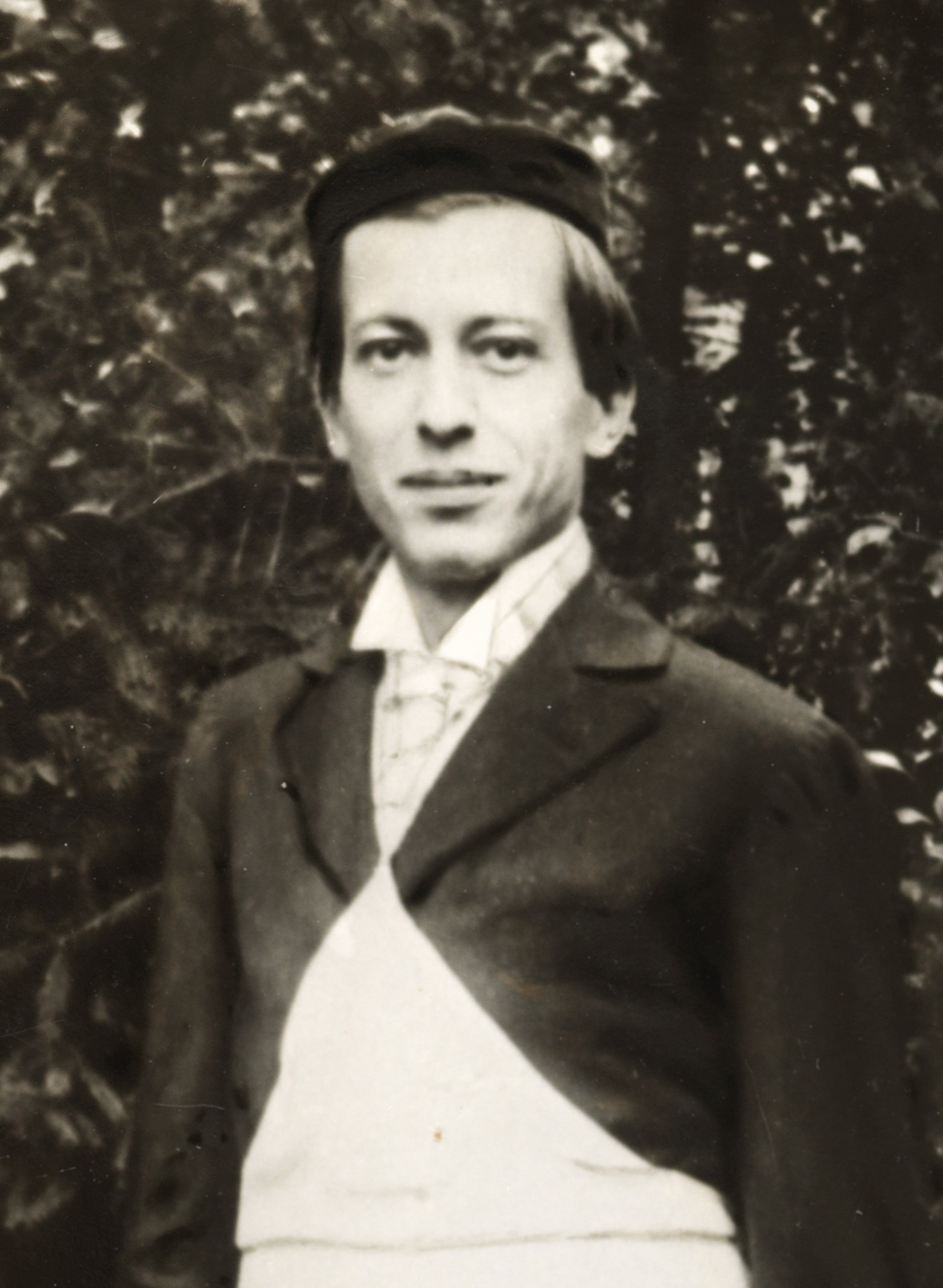
- Nicolae Paulescu in Paris in 1897
- Born: 30 October 1869; Bucharest, United Principalities of Moldavia and Wallachia
- Died: 17 July 1931 (aged 61); Bucharest, Kingdom of Romania
- Resting place: Bellu Cemetery, Bucharest
- Education: University of Paris
- Known for: Discovery of an antidiabetic hormone released by the pancreas, later called insulin

Member of the Legionary Senate
- In office 1929–1931

Personal details
- Party: Iron Guard
- Other political affiliations: National-Christian Defense League
- Scientific career
- Fields: Medicine
- Workplaces: Carol Davila University of Medicine and Pharmacy

Nicolae Constantin Paulescu (Romanian pronunciation: [nikoˈla.e pa.uˈlesku]; 30 October 1869 (O.S.) – 17 July 1931) was a Romanian physiologist, professor of medicine, and politician, most famous for his work on diabetes, including patenting pancreine (a pancreatic extract containing insulin). The "pancreine" was an extract of bovine pancreas in salted water, after which some impurites were removed with hydrochloric acid and sodium hydroxide. Paulescu was also, with A. C. Cuza, co-founder of the National Christian Union and later, of the National-Christian Defense League, an early ultranationalist and antisemitic Romanian party. He was also a leading member of the militant religious fascist Iron Guard.

== Early life and education ==
Born in Bucharest, he was the first of four children of Costache and Maria Paulescu. He displayed remarkable abilities as early as his first school years. He learned French, Latin and Ancient Greek at an early age, so that a few years later he became fluent in all these languages and was able to read classical works of Latin and Greek literature in the original. He also had a particular gift for drawing and music and special inclinations towards natural sciences, such as physics and chemistry. He graduated from the Mihai Viteazul High School in Bucharest in 1888.

In the autumn of 1888, Paulescu left for Paris, where he enrolled in medical school, where he studied with, among others, Étienne Lancereaux. In 1897 he graduated with a Doctor of Medicine degree, with a research thesis on the structure of the spleen. At the same time he studied chemistry and physiology at the Faculty of Science of the University of Paris, and also obtained a doctorate in science.

== Career ==
Upon receiving his M.D., Paulescu was immediately appointed as assistant surgeon at the Notre-Dame du Perpétuel-Secours Hospital in Paris. In 1900, Paulescu returned to Romania, where he remained until his death (1931) as Head of the Physiology Department of the University of Bucharest Medical School, as well as a Professor of Clinical Medicine at the St. Vincent de Paul Hospital in Bucharest.

=== Work on insulin ===
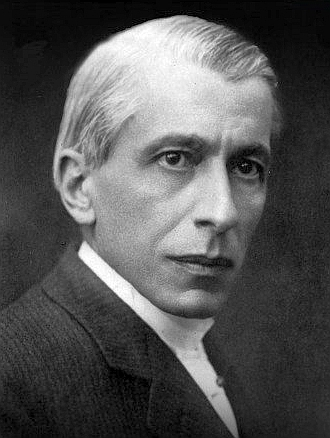
Nicolae Paulescu later in life

In 1916, he succeeded in developing an aqueous pancreatic extract which, when injected into a diabetic dog, proved to have a normalizing effect on blood sugar levels. Shortly after completing the experiments, he was called to service in the Romanian army. After World War I, he resumed his research.

From 24 April to 23 June 1921, Paulescu published four papers at the Romanian Section of the Society of Biology in Paris:

- The effect of the pancreatic extract injected into a diabetic animal by way of the blood.
- The influence of the time elapsed from the intravenous pancreatic injection into a diabetic animal.
- The effect of the pancreatic extract injected into a normal animal by way of the blood.

An extensive paper on this subject – "Research on the Role of the Pancreas in Food Assimilation" – was submitted by Paulescu on 22 June to the Archives Internationales de Physiologie in Liège, Belgium, and was published in the August 1921 issue of this journal.

The method used by Paulescu to prepare his pancreatic extract was similar to a procedure described by the American researcher Israel Kleiner in an article published two years earlier, in 1919, in the Journal of Biological Chemistry. Using his procedure, Kleiner had been able to demonstrate significant reductions in the concentration of blood and urinary glucose after intravenous injections of his extract.

Paulescu secured the patent rights for his method of manufacturing pancreine on 10 April 1922 (patent no. 6254) from the Romanian Ministry of Industry and Trade.

== Nobel Prize controversy ==
In February 1922, doctor Frederick Banting and biochemist John Macleod from the University of Toronto, Canada, published their paper on the successful use of a different, alcohol-based pancreatic extract for normalizing blood sugar (glucose) levels (glycemia) in a human patient. An unsuccessful attempt had been made on 11 January 1922, and a successful administration followed on 25 January 1922. The Toronto team felt confident in the purity of their insulin and injected it intravenously into the patient, clearing up his glycosuria and ketonuria and restoring normal blood sugar.

Paulescu's 1921 papers mentioned that the extract caused toxic side effects on dogs, which made it unusable in humans ("qui la rendent inapplicable dans la pratique médicale", 'which make it inapplicable in medical practice'). Therefore, when he tested his pancreatic extract on humans on 25 February 1922, he administered the extract rectally. The patients seemed to show some reduction in glycosuria. This apparent success emboldened him to inject his extract intravenously into a diabetic patient on 24 March, after which the patient's blood sugar apparently fell to zero (".000", "véritable AGLYCÉMIE"). A blood sugar level of zero should have placed the patient into a hypoglycemic coma, but he made no mention of this effect in any of his papers. In contrast, the Toronto team had known for several months that dogs could be placed into a diabetic coma by an overdose of insulin, so they prepared orange juice and candy for the clinical trials.

After Banting and Macleod were awarded the 1923 Nobel Prize in Physiology or Medicine, Nicolae Paulescu wrote to the Nobel Prize committee claiming that he had discovered insulin first. Paulescu prepared pancreatic extract in 1916 and tested it in dogs, but Israel Kleiner tested pancreatic extract in dogs in 1915, as did George Ludwig Zuelzer in 1906. Zuelzer also wrote to the Nobel Prize committee asserting priority. All of these earlier attempts had produced pancreatic extracts that caused side effects in dogs or humans. The Toronto team had noticed the same side effects with their earlier extracts, but they continued working on the problem until they had purified insulin.

Professor Ian Murray was particularly active in working to correct "the historical wrong" against Paulescu. Murray was a professor of physiology at the Anderson College of Medicine in Glasgow, Scotland, the head of the department of Metabolic Diseases at a leading Glasgow hospital, vice-president of the British Association of Diabetes, and a founding member of the International Diabetes Federation. In an article for a 1971 issue of the Journal of the History of Medicine and Allied Sciences, Murray wrote:

"Insufficient recognition has been given to Paulesco, the distinguished Roumanian scientist, who at the time when the Toronto team were commencing their research had already succeeded in extracting the antidiabetic hormone of the pancreas and proving its efficacy in reducing the hyperglycaemia in diabetic dogs."

"In a recent private communication Professor Tiselius, head of the Nobel Institute, has expressed his personal opinion that Paulesco was equally worthy of the award in 1923."

== Antisemitism ==
Paulescu has been criticized for his political activity centered on antisemitic views and eugenism, which found their expression also in articles such as The Judeo-Masonic plot against the Romanian nation (expressed in his book, Philosophic Physiology: The Hospital, the Koran, the Talmud, the Kahal and Freemasonry):

We Romanians are faced with a capital question: What shall we do with these uninvited guests who suddenly installed themselves in this country, or rather, with these evil parasites who are both thieves and assassins? Can we exterminate them just as, for instance, bedbugs are killed? This would be the simplest and handliest way of getting rid of them; if we were to act according to the laws of the Talmud, it would even be legitimate.

He then continued:

But no!—we must not even think of such a thing ... because we are Christians—Christians, so hated by the Jews! We must even forget revenge—sine qua non passion of a good shochet—for the plunders and the killings done or caused by the Jews. More than that! We must love the Jews and do them good—because we have Christ as our teacher—the spring of eternal love—who in His divine wisdom said: Love your enemies ... do good to them that hate you.

Nichifor Crainic, the principal ideologist of Orthodoxism, paid homage to Paulescu, by calling him "the founder of Christian nationalism" and "the most complete and most normative eminent doctrinaire of our nationalism."

The flag of Paulescu's "National Christian Party", described as "(Romanian) tricolour with a swastika"

He was an associate of ultranationalist Professor A. C. Cuza, and wrote extensively for the latter's newspaper, Apărarea Națională ('The National Defense'). Paulescu influenced Cuza to incorporate religion into his doctrine. He also heavily influenced the leader of the Iron Guard organisation, Corneliu Zelea Codreanu. Codreanu extensively quoted Paulescu, and acknowledged the powerful impact that Paulescu's ideas had on his own development. Paulescu was the first to link together Romanian antisemitism, Christianity and ultranationalism. In 1922, Paulescu co-founded the "National Christian Union", which evolved into the National-Christian Defense League (LANC) in 1923, together with A. C. Cuza. That same year, the NCU adopted the swastika as its official symbol.

In "Degenerarea rasei jidănești" (1928) (transl. 'Degeneration of the Jewish Race', using a racist slur), Paulescu states that Jews are degenerate because their brains weigh much less than "Aryan" brains. He singles out for their low brain weight the Nobel Prize laureates Anatole France (non-Jewish), Albert Einstein and Henri Bergson.

His starting point was a theory of passions and of social conflicts examined from the angle of a discipline he called "philosophical physiology". It was illustrated, in the main, by the behavior of Jews, who represented the extreme case of a race ruled by two essential passions: the instincts of domination and ownership.

Following protests from several Jewish organizations, the inauguration of Professor Paulescu's bust at the Hôtel-Dieu State Hospital in Paris, scheduled for 27 August 2003, had to be cancelled.

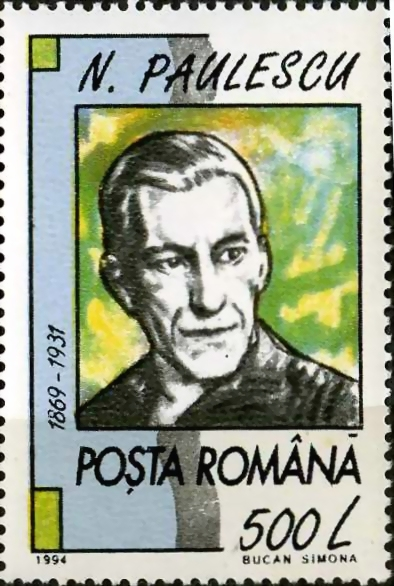
A Romanian 1994 stamp in honour of Paulescu

"If the Nobel Committee in 1923 judged the entire persona of its laureate, then Hôtel Dieu in 2003 must do no less and conclude that Paulescu's brutal inhumanity nullifies any scientific merit" (Simon Wiesenthal Center letter to the French Minister of Health, Jean-François Mattéi, and the Romanian Ambassador in Paris).

Nicolae Cajal, a Romanian Jewish member of the Romanian Academy of Sciences and the President of the Jewish Communities' Federation of Romania from 1994 to 2004, defended recognition of Paulescu's scientific work, saying there is a need to distinguish between individuals' private views and their scientific merit and that his father, Dr. Marcu Cajal, a student of Paulescu, had admired Paulescu for his scientific skills though he disagreed (as a Jew) with Paulescu's antisemitic views.

== Honours ==
Paulescu died in Bucharest in 1931. He is buried in Bellu Cemetery.

In 1990, he was elected posthumously as member of the Romanian Academy.

In 1993, the Institute of Diabetes, Nutrition and Metabolic Diseases in Bucharest was named in his honour (Institutul de Diabet, Nutriţie şi Boli Metabolice "N. C. Paulescu"). The institute was renamed on 3 March 1993, by the Ministry of Health Decree no. 273, at the initiative of Prof. Dr. Iulian Mincu.

On 27 June 1993, in Cluj-Napoca, a postmark was dedicated in Paulescu's honour as part of celebrating the World Day Against Diabetes. Paulescu was also honoured on a postage stamp issued by Romania in 1994. The stamp is one in a set of seven stamps honouring famous Romanians.
