= List of political parties in Romania =

Political Parties in Romania

This article lists political parties in Romania. Romania has a democratic multi-party system with numerous political parties, in which a political party does not often have the chance of gaining parliamentary majority alone, and, thus, parties must work with each other to form coalition governments. The current system was established following the Romanian Revolution of 1989 and the adoption of a new constitution in 1991; prior to these events, Romania was a single-party state under the rulership of the Romanian Communist Party (PCR).

Since the early 1990s, Romanian politics saw a gradual decrease in the number of political parties entering the Parliament and a relative consolidation of existing ones along ideological lines. Major political parties can be roughly grouped into three main "families", more specifically liberal, social democratic, or conservative. Extremist groups have a relatively low political profile in Romania, despite a surge in popularity of far-right and Eurosceptic political parties across many European Union (EU) countries during the 2010s.

Party switching (Romanian: traseism politic) remains a very concerning and significant issue, however, as does widespread corruption, leading to an overall low level of public trust in political parties. In December 2014 the level of trust stood at 12%. To counter this perception, the two largest parties as of 2015 (namely the Social Democrats and the National Liberals) have allegedly initiated a series of internal reforms to strengthen their integrity criteria and impose disciplinary sanctions on party members investigated or convicted on corruption charges.

== Legal framework ==
Article 40 of the Constitution of Romania states that citizens can freely associate into political parties, with the exception of judges, military, and police personnel as well as other civil servants which are apolitical by law. The same article bans political parties which campaign against political pluralism, the rule of law, and Romania's sovereignty and territorial integrity. Romania's party system is regulated by Law no. 14/2003 on political parties; the law initially mandated a list of 25,000 supporters, residing in at least 18 counties and the Municipality of Bucharest, for a political party to be formally registered.

Nevertheless, in February 2015, the unregistered Pirate Party of Romania (Romanian: Partidul Pirat din România) filed a complaint to the Constitutional Court, arguing that the list requirement is a violation of the constitutional provisions on freedom of association. The Court subsequently struck down the requirement as unconstitutional, and on 6 May 2015, the Romanian Parliament approved a modified version of the law, which allows the formation of a political party with 3 signatures.

== Parties represented in Parliament ==
The current political parties with parliamentary representation, in the order of the total number of representatives they hold as of July 2024 in the Chamber of Deputies and the Senate, are the following ones:

Logo	Name	Abbr.	Founded	Leader	Ideology	Position	Deputies	Senators	MEPs	European affiliation	Status
	Social Democratic Party; Partidul Social Democrat	PSD	1989; 2001	Sorin Grindeanu	Social democracy; Social conservatism; Left-wing nationalism; Left-wing populism	Centre-left or big tent	92 / 330	43 / 135	11 / 33	PES	Government
	Alliance for the Union of Romanians; Alianța pentru Unirea Românilor	AUR	2019	George Simion	Revolutionary nationalism; Christian right; Conservatism; Right-wing populism	Far-right	62 / 330	30 / 135	3 / 33	ECR	Opposition
	National Liberal Party; Partidul Național Liberal	PNL	1875; 1990	Ilie Bolojan	Christian democracy; Conservatism	Centre-right	55 / 330	27 / 135	8 / 33	EPP	Support (Note: PNL does not participate in the government, however almost all PNL MPs vote in favor of Niculescu cabinet on october confidence vote..)
	Save Romania Union; Uniunea Salvați România	USR	2016	Dominic Fritz	Liberalism; Pro-Europeanism	Centre to centre-right	40 / 330	18 / 135	2 / 33	ALDE	Opposition
	Democratic Union of Hungarians in Romania; Uniunea Democrată Maghiară din România; Romániai Magyar Demokrata Szövetség	UDMR; RMDSZ	1989	Hunor Kelemen	Hungarian interests; Social conservatism; Regionalism; Pro-Europeanism	Centre-right	21 / 330	10 / 135	2 / 33	EPP	Support (Note: UDMR does not participate in the government, however all UDMR MPs and vote in favor of Niculescu cabinet on october confidence vote..)
	S.O.S. Romania; S.O.S. România	SOS RO	2021	Diana Șoșoacă	Romanian nationalism; Right-wing populism; Hard Euroscepticism; Russophilia	Far-right	13 / 330	0 / 135	1 / 33	NI	Opposition
	Party of Young People; Partidul Oamenilor Tineri	POT	2023	Anamaria Gavrilă	Romanian nationalism; Right-wing populism; National conservatism; Christian right	Right-wing to far-right	13 / 330	0 / 135	0 / 33	NI	Support (Note: POT does not participate in the government, however a part of POT MPs and also UPR paralmentary group vote in favor of Niculescu cabinet on october confidence vote..)
	National Union for Innovation and Tradition; Partidul Uniunea Națională pentru Inovație și Tradiție	UNIT	2025	Aurora Tasica Simu		Right-wing	4 / 330	0 / 134	0 / 33	NI	Opposition
	Peace – Romania First; Pace – Întâi România	PACE	2025	TBD	Sovereigntism; Pro-Europeanism (alleged)	Right-wing (alleged)	1 / 330	2 / 135	0 / 33	None	Support (Note: PACE does not participate in the government, however all PACE MPs vote in favor of Niculescu cabinet on october confidence vote..)
	Conservative Liberal Humanist Party Partidul Umanist Conservator Liberal	PUCL	2015	Toni Greblă	Humanism; Social conservatism	Centrist or syncretic	0 / 330	0 / 135	1 / 33	S&D	Support (Note: PUSL does not participate in the government, however all PUSL MPs are part of the PSD group, which supports the government.)

In addition, ethnic minority organizations are granted each seat in the Chamber of Deputies if: (1) are the sole official representative organization of the minority; (2) they participate in the legislative election and do not pass the 5% threshold but obtain at least 10% of the number of votes calculated to correspond to electing one deputy. These seats are added to the number of seats put up for election. As of 2021, there are eighteen such seats. The Hungarian minority organization, the Democratic Alliance of Hungarians in Romania (UDMR/RMDSZ) has always passed the 5% threshold for both houses of the Romanian Parliament, and has been treated as a regular political party (and acting like one as well).

== Parties only represented in the European Parliament ==
Aside from the political parties represented in the Romanian Parliament, the following political parties only have representation in the European Parliament:

Logo	Name	Abbr.	Founded	Leader	Ideology	Position	MEPs	European affiliation
	People's Movement Party; Partidul Mișcarea Populară	PMP	2014	Elena Udrea	Christian democracy; Moldovan–Romanian unionism; Social conservatism; National conservatism	Centre-right to right-wing	1 / 33	European People's Party
	Romanian National Conservative Party; Partidul Național Conservator Român	PNCR	2023	Cristian Terheș	National conservatism; Right-wing populism; Soft Euroscepticism	Right-wing	1 / 33	European Christian Political Party

== Minor parties ==
=== Ethnic minority organizations ===
Association of Italians of Romania	Asociația Italienilor din România - RO.AS.IT., Associazione degli Italiani di Romania - RO.AS.IT.
Association of Macedonians of Romania	Asociația Macedonenilor din România, Друштвото на Македонците од Романија
Bulgarian Union of the Banat - Romania	Uniunea Bulgară din Banat - România, Български съюз на Банат - Румъния
Community of the Lipovan Russians in Romania	Comunitatea Rușilor Lipoveni din România, Община русских-липован Румынии
Cultural Union of Ruthenians of Romania	Uniunea Culturală a Rutenilor din România, Културне Товариство Русинів Романії
Democratic Forum of Germans in Romania	Forumul Democrat al Germanilor din România, Demokratisches Forum der Deutschen in Rumänien
Democratic Union of Slovaks and Czechs in Romania	Uniunea Democratică a Slovacilor și Cehilor din România, Demokratický svaz Slováků a Čechů v Rumunsku, Demokratický zväz Slovákov a Čechov v Rumunsku
Democratic Union of Turkish-Muslim Tatars of Romania	Uniunea Democrată a Tătarilor Turco-Musulmani din România, Romanya Müslüman Tatar Türklerĭ Demokrat Bĭrlĭgĭ
Federation of Jewish Communities of Romania	Federația Comunităților Evreiești din România
Forum of Czechs in Romania	Forumul Cehilor din România, Fórum Čechů v Rumunsku
Hellenic Union of Romania	Uniunea Elenă din România, Ένωση Ελλήνων της Ρουμανίας
League of Albanians of Romania	Liga Albanezilor din România, Liga e shqiptarëve në Rumani
Party of the Roma	Partida Romilor, Partida le Romenge
Turkish Democratic Union of Romania	Uniunea Democrată Turcă din România, Romanya Türk Demokrat Birliği
Union of Armenians of Romania	Uniunea Armenilor din România, Ռումինիայի հայերի միություն
Union of Croatians of Romania	Uniunea Croaților din România, Zajedništvo Hrvata u Rumunjskoj
Union of Poles of Romania	Uniunea Polonezilor din România "Dom Polski", Związek Polaków w Rumunii "Dom Polski"
Union of Serbs of Romania	Uniunea Sârbilor din România, Савез Срба у Румунији
Union of Ukrainians of Romania	Uniunea Ucrainienilor din România, Союз українців Румунії

=== Other parties ===
Party	Native name (Abbr.)	Ideology	Since	Alliance	European Party
Christian Democratic National Peasants' Party	Partidul Național Țărănesc Creștin Democrat (PNȚCD)	Agrarianism	1989	None	European Christian Political Party
Romanian Ecologist Party	Partidul Ecologist Român (PER)	Green conservatism	1990	Romania First Political Platform	None
Greater Romania Party	Partidul România Mare (PRM)	Romanian nationalism	1991	Romania First Political Platform	None
Communists' Party (Nepeceriști)	Partidul Comuniștilor (Nepecerişti) (PCN)	Communism; Anti-PCR	1996 (founded); 2006 (registered); 2016 (reformed)	None	None
Romanian Socialist Party	Partidul Socialist Român (PSR)	Communism	2003	Socialist Romania	Party of the European Left
Green Party	Partidul Verde (PV)	Green politics	2005 (originally); 2022 (re-founded)	AER for Romania (formerly)	European Green Party
Pirate Party Romania	Partidul Pirat România (PPR)	Pirate politics	2009	None	European Pirate Party (formerly)
Party for the Homeland, Military and Police (Formerly National Union for the Progress of Romania)	Partidul pentru Patrie, Militari și Polițiști (PPMP) (Formerly Uniunea Națională pentru Progresul României (UNPR))	Militarism (Formerly Progressivism)	2010 (as UNPR); 2025 (as PPMP)	PSD–UNPR–ALDE Alliance (formerly)	None
The New Right	Noua Dreaptă (ND)	Neo-Legionarism	2015 (as a party)	National Identity Bloc in Europe	Alliance for Peace and Freedom
Party of Free People	Partidul Oamenilor Liberi (POL)	Participatory democracy	2015	None	None
PRO Romania	PRO România (PRO)	Social liberalism	2017 (founded); 2018 (registered)	Romania First Political Platform	Party of European Socialists (observer)
Democracy and Solidarity Party	Partidul Democrației și Solidarității (Demos)	Democratic socialism	2018	Platform for Democracy, Prosperity, and Progress	Central-Eastern European Green Left Alliance
National Peasant Alliance	Alianța Național Țărănistă (ANȚ)	Agrarianism	2019	None	None
Romanian Nationhood Party	Partidul Neamul Românesc (NR)	Romanian ultranationalism	2019	Romanian Sovereignist Bloc	None
The Right Alternative	Alternativa Dreaptă (AD)	National conservatism	2019	Alliance of Liberal-Conservative Right Forces	European Conservatives and Reformists Party
Romania in Action Party	Partidul România în Acțiune (România în Acțiune)	Localism	2020	România Renaște	None
NOW Party	Partidul ACUM (ACUM)	Green politics	2021	Platform for Democracy, Prosperity, and Progress	European Green Party (intention to join)
Volt Romania	Volt România (Volt)	European federalism	2021	Platform for Democracy, Prosperity, and Progress	Volt Europa
Force of the Right	Forța Dreptei (FD)	Liberal conservatism	2021	Alliance of Liberal-Conservative Right Forces	None
Hungarian Alliance of Transylvania	Alianța Maghiară din Transilvania (AMT)	Hungarian minority interests	2022	None	European Free Alliance
Nation People Together	Națiune Oameni Împreună (NOI)	Social conservatism	2022	None	None
Patriots of the Romanian People	Patrioții Poporului Român (PPR)	Right-wing Populism	2022	None	None
Renewing Romania's European Project	Reînnoim Proiectul European al României (REPER)	Liberalism	2022	Platform for Democracy, Prosperity, and Progress	Renew Europe
Health Education Nature Sustainability Party	Partidul Sănătate, Educație, Natură, Sustenabilitate (SENS)	Progressivism; Green politics	2023	None	None
Justice and Respect in Europe for All Party	Partidul Dreptate și Respect în Europa pentru Toți (DREPT)	Centrism	2023	None	None
United Social Democratic Party	Partidul Social Democrat Unit (PSD Unit)	Social democracy	2023	None	None
National Action League Party	Partidul Liga Acțiunii Naționale (PLAN)	Social liberalism	2024	None	None
Social Justice Party	Partidul Justiției Sociale (PJS)	Social democracy Anti-austerity	2025	None	None
Romania's Reformation Nationalist Party	Partidul Naționalist Reformarea României (PNRR)	Civic nationalism	2025	None	None

== Defunct parties ==
=== Parties active 1859–1918 ===
Conservative Party	Partidul Conservator	Active 1880–1918
Conservative-Democratic Party	Partidul Conservator-Democrat	An offshoot of the Conservative Party, led by Take Ionescu; merged into the Conservative Nationalist Party; active 1908–1922
Conservative Nationalist Party	Partidul Conservator Naționalist	An offshoot of the Conservative Party, active 1916–c.1935
Constitutional Party	Partidul Constituțional	Active 1891–1907
Democratic Nationalist Party	Partidul Naționalist-Democrat (PND)	Right-wing nationalist party; active 1910–1938
Free and Independent Faction	Fracțiunea liberă și independentă	Active 1866–1875; merged into the National Liberal Party
National Liberal Party	Partidul Național-Liberal	Active 1875–1947
National Party	Partida Națională	Active 1856–1859
Peasants' Party	Partida Țărănească	Active 1895
Radical Party / Radical Democratic Party	Partidul Radical / Partidul Democrat Radical	An offshoot of the National Liberal Party, led by George Panu; active c. 1884–1895; merged into the Conservative Party
Social Democratic Party of Romania	Partidul Social Democrat din România (PSDR)	Active 1910–1916, groups active illegally 1916–1918; Transformed into the Socialist Party of Romania
Social Democratic Workers' Party of Romania	Partidul Social-Democrat al Muncitorilor din România (PSDMR)	Active 1893–1899; most of its leadership joined the National Liberal Party, with others members eventually joining the Social Democratic Party of Romania

=== Parties active 1918−1947 ===
The following parties were all active in Romania in the interwar period and, in some cases, through and after World War II. Dates of founding and dissolution are given, where known. Failing that, the earliest and latest dates known for activities are given.

This period saw the proliferation of numerous extremist parties inspired by fascism, socialism and Communism. The latter were effectively banned in 1924 by the so-called Mârzescu law. A succession of coups drastically altered the political landscape as Romania went through a single-party dictatorship under the National Renaissance Front (1938–1940), then a military dictatorship without political parties (1940–1944), then briefly returning to multiparty democracy before finally becoming a people's republic (1944–1947).

Agrarian League	Liga Agrară	Offshoot of the People's Party; active 1929–1938
Agrarian Union Party	Partidul Uniunea Agrară	Led by Constantin Argetoianu; active 1932–1938
Bessarabian Peasants' Party	Partidul Țărănesc din Basarabia (PȚ)	Founded in the Moldavian Democratic Republic; most of it merged into the Peasants' Party in 1921, a wing led by Ion Inculeț kept the name and later joined the National Liberal Party; active 1918–1923
Bolshevik Leninist Group of Romania	Grupul Bolșevic Leninist din România	A Trotskyist grouping led by David Korner; active 1935.
Citizen Bloc	Blocul Cetățenesc	A nationalist party led by Grigore Forțu; active 1934
Citizen Committees-Dem. I. Dobrescu	Comitetele Cetățenești Dem. I. Dobrescu	A dissident wing of the National Peasants' Party; active 1935–1938
Communist Party of Romania	Partidul Comunist din România (PCdR)	Founded in 1921 as the Socialist-Communist Party (Partidul Socialist-Comunist), a group that emerged from the Socialist Party of Romania; after 1944 Romanian Communist Party (Partidul Comunist Român (PCR)); active 1921–1948. Absorbed the Social Democratic Party and renamed itself the Romanian Workers' Party
Conservative-Democratic Party	Partidul Conservator-Democrat	An offshoot of the Conservative Party, led by Take Ionescu; merged into the Conservative Nationalist Party; active 1908–1922
Conservative Nationalist Party	Partidul Conservator Naționalist	An offshoot of the Conservative Party, active 1916 – c.1935
Crusade of Romanianism	Cruciada Românismului	Fascist party; active 1935–1936.
Democratic Bloc / Democratic Union	Blocul democratic / Uniunea democratică	Anti-fascist political organizations under the influence of the Romanian Communist Party, active 1935–1936, 1937–1939
Democratic Nationalist Party	Partidul Naționalist-Democrat (PND)	Right-wing nationalist party, active 1910–1938
Democratic Peasants' Party–Stere	Partidul Țărănesc-Democrat Constantin Stere (PȚD)	A dissident wing of the National Peasants' Party, merged with the Radical Peasants' Party; active 1930–1933
Democratic Peasants' Party–Lupu	Partidul Țărănesc-Democrat Nicolae L. Lupu (PȚD)	A dissident wing of the National Peasants' Party; active 1946–1948
Democratic Union Party	Partidul Democrat al Unirii	Nationalist offshoot of National Liberal Party active 1919-1923
Swastika of Fire	Svastica de Foc	Fascist party, an offshoot of the National-Christian Defense League; active 1935–1938
German Party	Partidul German din România (PGR) / Deutsche Partei in Rumänien	Generally backing the party in government, it became strongly influenced by Nazism after 1936; active 1919–1944
German People's Party	Partidul Poporului German din România (PPGR) / Deutsche Volkspartei in Rumänien (DVPR)	An offshoot of the German Party, active 1935–1938
Hungarian People's Union	Uniunea Populară Maghiară (UPM) / Magyar Népi Szövetség (MNSZ)	An offshoot of the Magyar Party, created as Union of Hungarian Workers of Romania' (Magyar Dolgozók Országos Szövetsége (MADOSZ)), in close alliance with the Communist Party of Romania; active 1934–1953
Independent Social Democratic Party	Partidul Social Democrat Independent (PSDI)	A dissident wing of the Social Democratic Party, led by Constantin Titel Petrescu; active 1946–1947
Iron Guard	Garda de Fier	The usual name of the group founded as the Legion of the Archangel Michael (Legiunea Arhanghelul Mihail or Legiunea Arhanghelului Mihail), running in election first as the "Corneliu Codreanu" Grouping (Gruparea "Corneliu Codreanu") and then as the Everything For the Country Party (Partidul Totul pentru Țară (TPȚ)) - fascist party active between 1927 and c. 1944–1945 (with minor groups claiming heritage to this day)
Jewish Democratic Committee	Comitetul Democratic Evreiesc	In close alliance with the Communist Party of Romania; active 1946–1948
Jewish Party	Partidul Evreiesc	Active 1923–1938
Labour Party	Partidul Muncei	Active 1918; merged into the Peasants' Party
League Against Usury	Liga Contra Cametei	Active 1929 – c.1931
Liberal Democratic Party	Partidul Liberal-Democrat (PLD)	Founded as "Free Man" Grouping (Gruparea "Omul Liber") - a dissident wing of the National Liberal Party, led by Jean Th. Florescu; active 1931–1935.
Magyar Party	Partidul Maghiar	Active 1922–1938
National-Agrarian Action	Acțiunea Național-Agrară (ANA)	An offshoot of the National Peasants' Party, merged into the National Union for Work and Reconstruction; active 1946–1947
National Agrarian Party	Partidul Național Agrar (PNA)	An offshoot of the People's Party, merged into the National Christian Party; active c.1931–1935
Guard of the National Conscience	Garda Conștiinței Naționale (GCN)	Proto-fascist government-backed Romanian workers' organization; active 1919-1920. The organization was important in Corneliu Zelea Codreanu's development and political worldview.
National Christian Union	Uniunea Națională Creștină (UNC)	A short-lived proto-fascist party founded by A.C. Cuza and Nicolae Paulescu after Cuza parted ways with Nicolae Iorga and the Democratic Nationalist Party split. Active 1922; predecessor of the National-Christian Defense League
National-Christian Defense League	Liga Apărării Național-Creștine (LANC)	A far right proto-fascist party, merged into National Christian Party; active 1923–1935
National Christian Party	Partidul Național-Creștin (PNC)	Fascist party, active 1935–1938
National-Corporatist League	Liga Național-Corporatistă	A fascist party, led by Mihail Manoilescu; active 1932–1938
National Fascist Movement	Mișcarea Națională Fascistă (MNF)	Active cca. 1923
National Italo-Romanian Cultural and Economic Movement	Mișcarea Națională Culturală și Economică Italo-Română	Fascist party, merged into the National Fascist Movement; active 1921–1923
National Liberal Party	Partidul Național-Liberal (PNL)	Active 1875–1947; the present-day PNL claims to be the successor of this party.
National Liberal Party-Brătianu	Partidul Național Liberal-Brătianu (PNL)	A dissident wing of the National Liberal Party; active 1931–1935
National Liberal Party-Tătărescu/National Liberal Party-Bejan	Partidul Național-Liberal-Tătărescu (PNL) / Partidul Național-Liberal-Bejan (PNL)	A dissident wing of the National Liberal Party; active 1944–1948
National Peasants' Party	Partidul Național Țărănesc (PNȚ)	Merger of the Romanian National Party and the Peasants' Party; active 1926–1947
National Peasants' Party–Alexandrescu	Partidul Național Țărănesc-Anton Alexandrescu (PNȚ)	An offshoot of the National Peasants' Party, in close alliance with the Romanian Communist Party, merged into the Ploughmen's Front; active 1945–1948
National Renaissance Front	Frontul Renașterii Naționale (FRN)	Renamed Party of the Nation (Partidul Națiunii) in 1940, created as the fascist-inspired single official corporatist party by King Carol II; active 1938–1940
National Romanian Fascio	Fascia Națională Română	Merged into the National Fascist Movement; active c.1920–1923
National Socialist Party of Romania	Partidul Național-Socialist din România	Fascist party; active 1933
National Socialist German Workers' Party of the German ethnic group in Romania	Nationalsozialistische Deutsche Arbeiterpartei der deutschen Volksgruppe in Rumänien (NSDAP-DVGiR) / Partidul Național-Socialist Muncitoresc German al Grupului Etnic German din România	Local branch of the Nazi Party, membership limited to the German minority; active 1940–1944
National Union for Work and Reconstruction	Uniunea Națională Muncă și Refacere (UNMR)	Led by Constantin Argetoianu, partly merged into the Union of Patriots and the Ploughmen's Front; active 1947
Peasant Workers' Bloc	Blocul Muncitoresc-Țărănesc (BMȚ)	An umbrella group for the banned Communist Party of Romania; active 1925–1933
Peasants' Party	Partidul Țărănesc (PȚ)	Founded 1918, merged with the Romanian National Party into the National Peasants' Party in 1927
Peasants' Party–Lupu	Partidul Țărănesc Nicolae L. Lupu (PȚD)	A dissident wing of the National Peasants' Party; active 1927–1934
People's Party	Partidul Poporului (PP)	Founded under the name People's League (Liga Poporului); active 1918–1929
Ploughmen's Front	Frontul Plugarilor	Closely associated with the Romanian Communist Party; active 1933–1953
Progressive Conservative Party	Partidul Conservator-Progresist	An offshoot of the Conservative Party, led by Alexandru Marghiloman; active in 1918
Radical Peasants' Party	Partidul Țărănesc-Radical (PȚR)	A dissident wing of the National Peasants' Party; active 1933–1938
Romanian Front	Frontul Român (FR)	Far right offshoot of National Peasants' Party; active 1935 – c.1944
Romanian National Party	Partidul Național Român (PNR)	Founded inside Austria-Hungary in 1881, merged with the Peasants' Party to form the National Peasants' Party in 1927
Social Democratic Party	Partidul Social Democrat (PSD or PSDR)	Created from the merger of the parties forming the Federation of Romanian Socialist Parties, merged into the Romanian Communist Party; active 1927–1948
Social Democratic Party of Bukovina	Partidul Social Democrat din Bucovina	Founded inside Austria-Hungary, briefly joined into the Socialist Party of Romania, before separating again and becoming an autonomous section of the Federation of Romanian Socialist Parties, which evolved into the Social Democratic Party; active 1896–1920, 1921–1927
Socialist Party (Popovici)	Partidul Socialist (PS)	An offshoot of the Social Democratic Party, led by Constantin Popovici, merged with the Independent Socialist Party to create the Unitary Socialist Party, only to break from the latter and ultimately join the Union of Patriots; active 1933, 1935–1944
Social Democratic Party of Transylvania and Banat / Socialist Party of Transylvania and Banat	Partidul Social Democrat din Transilvania și Banat / Partidul Socialist din Transilvania și Banat	Founded inside Austria-Hungary, it emerged from the Hungarian Social Democratic Party, and briefly joined into the Socialist Party of Romania, before separating again and becoming an autonomous section of the Federation of Romanian Socialist Parties, which evolved into the Social Democratic Party; active 1906–1920, 1921–1927
Socialist Democratic Party	Partidul Socialist Democrat (PSD)	Created by Ioan Flueraș and George Grigorovici, expelled from the Social Democratic Party for collaboration with totalitarian regimes; active 1945–1946
Socialist Party of Romania	Partidul Socialist din România (PS)	Formed by members of the Social Democratic Party, it absorbed the Social Democratic Party of Transylvania and Banat and the Romanian Social Democratic Party of Bukovina; active 1918–1921
Socialist Peasants' Party	Partidul Socialist-Țărăneasc (PSȚ)	A dissident wing of the National Peasants' Party, merged into the Ploughmen's Front; active 1943–1944
Socialist Workers Party / Independent Socialist Party	Partidul Socialist al Muncitorilor (PSM) / Partidul Socialist Independent (PSI)	An offshoot of the Social Democratic Party, led by Leon Ghelerter, merged with the Socialist Party (Popovici) to create the Unitary Socialist Party; active 1928–1933
Union of Patriots/National Popular Party	Uniunea Patrioților / Partidul Național-Popular (PNP)	In close alliance with the Communist Party of Romania; active 1942–1948
Ukrainian Workers' Party of Romania	Партія українських працюючих Румунії "Визволення"/Vîzvolenia	An offshoot of the Social Democratic Party of Bukovina, it closely collaborated with the Worker-Peasant Bloc; active primarily in northern Bukovina, in 1929–1934.
Unitary Socialist Party	Partidul Socialist Unitar (PSU)	Merger of the Independent Socialist Party and the Socialist Party (Popovici), merged into the Social Democratic Party; active 1933–1938, 1944
Vlad Țepeș League	Liga "Vlad Țepeș"	Offshoot of the People's Party, led by Grigore Filipescu; active 1929–1938

=== Communist-era parties (1947–1989) ===
Although distinct parties in the communist era were not politically relevant, the following were the officially recognized political forces:

Romanian Communist Party	Partidul Comunist Român (PCR)	Known as Romanian Workers' Party (Partidul Muncitoresc Român (PMR)) between 1948 and 1965; disestablished in 1989
Front of Socialist Unity and Democracy	Frontul Democrației și Unității Socialiste (FDUS)	An organization created as an outlet of the PCR; active 1968–1989
Hungarian People's Union	Uniunea Populară Maghiară (UPM) / Magyar Népi Szövetség (MNSZ)	Created as Union of Hungarian Workers of Romania (Magyar Dolgozók Országos Szövetsége (MADOSZ)), in close alliance with the Romanian Communist Party; active 1934–1953
Jewish Democratic Committee	Comitetul Democratic Evreiesc	In close alliance with the Romanian Communist Party; active 1946–1953
Ploughmen's Front	Frontul Plugarilor	Closely associated with the Romanian Communist Party; active 1933–1953

Other parties were allowed to exist, with unclear status, until mid 1948.

=== Post−1989 parties ===
Alliance for Romania	Alianța pentru România (ApR)	Splinter of the Party of Social Democracy in Romania (PDSR); absorbed into National Liberal Party; active June, 1997–August, 2001
Civic Alliance Party	Partidul Alianța Civică (PAC)	Absorbed into National Liberal Party; active 1991–1998
Civic Force	Forța Civică (FC)	Absorbed into Democratic Liberal Party; active 2004–2014
Conservative Party	Partidul Conservator (PC)	Founded as the Romanian Humanist Party; merged into the Alliance of Liberals and Democrats; active 1991–2015
Democratic Agrarian Party of Romania	Partidul Democrat Agrar din România (PDAR)	Merged into the Romanian National Party; active 1990–1998
Democratic Force	Forţa Democrată (FD)	Created by former members of the Democratic Party; active 2004–2013
Democratic Liberal Party	Partidul Democrat Liberal (PDL)	Absorbed into National Liberal Party; active 2007–2014
Democratic Front of National Salvation	Frontul Democrat al Salvării Naționale (FDSN)	Splinter of the National Salvation Front, merged into the Party of Social Democracy in Romania; active 1992–1993
Democratic Party	Partidul Democrat (PD)	Created as the National Salvation Front, merged into the Democratic Liberal Party; active 1990–2007
Democratic Party of Labour	Partidul Democrat al Muncii (PDM)	Merged into the Democratic Party; active 1990–1994
Democratic Union of the Roma of Romania	Uniunea Democratică a Romilor din România (UDRR)	Active 1990–1992
Ecological Federation of Romania	Federația Ecologistă din România (FER)	Splinter of Ecological Federation of Romania, absorbed into People's Action; active 1990–2004
Ecological Movement of Romania	Mișcarea Ecologistă din România (MER)	Absorbed into Ecological Federation of Romania; active 1990–1998
Ecologist Union of Romania Party	Partidul Uniunea Ecologistă din România (PUER)	Absorbed into Ecologist Party of Romania; active March–August 2012
Everything For the Country Party	Partidul "Totul Pentru Țară (PTT)	Dissolved; active 1993–2015
Freedom, Unity and Solidarity Party	Partidul Libertate, Unitate și Solidaritate (PLUS)	Merged into Save Romania Union; active 2018–2020
Liberal Democratic Party	Partidul Liberal Democrat (PLD)	Splinter of the Democratic Party, merged into the Democratic Liberal Party; active 2006–2007
Liberal Party	Partidul Liberal (PL)	Absorbed into the National Liberal Party; active 1997–1998
Liberal Party 1993	Partidul Liberal 1993 (PL '93)	Merged into the Liberal Party; active 1993–1997
Liberal Reformist Party	Partidul Liberal Reformator (PLR)	Splinter of the National Liberal Party, merged into the Alliance of Liberals and Democrats; active 2014–2015
Liberal Union–Bratiănu	Liberal Union–Brătianu (UL-B)	Splinter of the National Liberal Party; active 1990–2003
M10	M10	Merged into The Right Alternative; active 2015–2019
National Alliance Party	Partidul Alianța Națională (PAN)	Merged into Democratic Party; active 2000–2001
National Christian Democratic Alliance	Alianța Natională Creștin Democrată (ANCD)	Splinter of the Christian Democratic National Peasants' Party, rejoined the main party; active 1999–2001
National Democratic Christian Party	Partidul Național Democrat Creștin (PNDC)	Active 1990–2014
National Democratic Party	Partidul Național Democrat (PND)	Merged into the Party of the Social-Democratic Unity; active 1990–1992
National Initiative Party	Partidul Inițiativa Națională (PIN)	Create by former members of the Democratic Party, absorbed into the National Union for the Progress of Romania; active 2005–2011
National Liberal Party-Câmpeanu	Partidul Național-Liberal-Câmpeanu (PNL-C)	Splinter of the National Liberal Party, rejoined the main party; active 1995–2003
National Liberal Party-Democratic Convention	Partidul Național Liberal - Convenţia Democrată (PNL-CD)	Splinter of the National Liberal Party, merged into the Liberal Party; active 1991–1997
National Liberal Party Youth Wing	Partidul Național-Liberal Aripa Tînără (PNL-AT)	Splinter of the National Liberal Party, merged into the Liberal Party 1993; active 1990–1992
National Reconstruction Party of Romania	Partidul Reconstrucției Naționale a României (PRNR)	Merged into Democratic Agrarian Party of Romania; active 1990–1992
National Salvation Front–Social Democratic	Frontul Salvării Naţionale–Social Democrat (FSN–SD)	Splinter of the National Salvation Front, merged into the Party of the Social-Democratic Unity; active 1991–1992
New Romania Party	Partidul Noua Românie (PNR)	Merged into the Romanian National Party; active 1994–1998
Party of Free Change	Partidul Liber-Schimbist (PL-S)	Active 1990–1996
Party of Young Free Democrats of Romania	Partidul Tineretului Liber Democrat din Romania (PTLD)	Merged into the Republican Party (1990); active 1990–1992
Party of Social Democracy in Romania	Partidul Democrației Sociale din România (PSDR)	Merged into the Social Democratic Party; active 1993–2001
Party of Romanian Life	Partidul Vieții Românești (PVR)	Active 2000–2002
Party of the Social Democratic Unity	Partidul Unității Social Democrate (PUSD)	Merged into the Democratic Party; active 1992–1995
People's Action	Acțiunea Populară (AP)	Splinter of the Christian Democratic National Peasants' Party, merged into the National Liberal Party; active 2003–2008
People's Party	Partidul Popular (PP)	Merged into the National Liberal Party; active 2003–2014
People's Party – Dan Diaconescu	Partidul Poporului – Dan Diaconescu (PP-DD)	Absorbed into the National Union for the Progress of Romania; active 2011–2015
Republican Party (1990)	Partidul Republican (PR)	Merged into the Party of Social Democracy in Romania (PDSR); active 1990–1993
Republican Party (1993)	Partidul Republican (PR)	Created by former members of the Republican Party (1990); active 1993–2003
Republican Party (2004)	Partidul Republican (PR)	Created as the Party of the Third Millennium, renamed in 2005; active 2004–2007
Romanian Democratic Front	Frontul Democrat Român (FDR)	Merged into the Democratic Party; active 1990–1997
Romanian Liberal Democratic Party	Partidul Liberal Democrat Român (PLDR)	Created by former members of the Liberal Party, merged into the Greater Romania Party; active 1999–2002
Romanian National Party	Partidul Național Român (PNR)	Merged into the National Alliance Party; active 1998–2000
Romanian National Unity Party	Partidul Unității Naționale a Românilor / Partidul Unității Națiunii Române (PUNR)	Merged into the National Alliance Party in 2000; re-emerged as a distinct party in 2001; merged into the Conservative Party in 2006; active 1990–2000, 2001–2006
Romanian Rebirth Party	Partidul Renașterea Românească (PRR)	Active 2004–2013
Romanian Social Democratic Party	Partidul Social Democrat Român (PSDR)	Merged into the Social Democratic Party; active 1990–2001
Romanian Social Party	Partidul Social Românesc (PSRO)	Created as Romanian Democratic Union, name changed in 2015; active 2013–2018
Romanian Socialist Democratic Party	Partidul Socialist Democratic Român (PSDR)	Merged into the Party of Social Democracy in Romania (PDSR); active 1990–1993
Romanian Socialist Party (1992)	Partidul Socialist Român (PSR)	Active 1992–2013
Social Protection People's Party	Partidul Popular și al Protecției Sociale (PPPS)	Absorbed into National Union for the Progress of Romania; active 1994–2011
Save Bucharest Union	Uniunea Salvaţi Bucureştiul (USB)	Absorbed into the Save Romania Union; active 2015–2016
Socialist Alliance Party	Partidul Alianța Socialistă (PAS)	Created by former members of the Socialist Party of Labour, merged into the Socialist Alternative Party; active 2004–2013
Socialist Party of Labour	Partidul Socialist al Muncii (PSM)	Absorbed into the Social Democratic Party; active 1990–2003
Socialist Liberal Party	Partidul Socialist Liberal	Created by Niculae Cerveni. It was shortly after absorbed into the National Liberal Party; active 1989–1991
Union for Romanian Reconstruction	Uniunea pentru Reconstrucția României (URR)	Absorbed into Christian Democratic National Peasants' Party; active 2002–2005
Union of Right-Wing Forces	Uniunea Forțelor de Dreapta (UFD)	Founded as Alternative for Romania Party (Partidul Alternativa României, PAR), changed its name to UFD in 2000, absorbed into National Liberal Party in April 2003; active 1996–2003
Workers' Social Democratic Party	Partidul Social Democrat al Muncitorilor (PSDM)	Created by former members of the Romanian Social Democratic Party as the Social Democratic Party "Constantin Titel Petrescu", renamed in 2011; active 2003–2013
Alliance of Liberals and Democrats	Alianța Liberalilor și Democraților (ALDE)	Absorbed into the National Liberal Party (PNL); active 2015–2022
United Romania Party	Partidul România Unită (PRU)	Active 2015–2019
Party of the Revolution	Partidul Revoluției (PR)	Active 2016
United Left Party	Partidul Stângii Unite (PSU)	Active 2005
Social Democratic Workers' Party	Partidul Social Democrat al Muncitorilor (PSDM)	Active 2015
New Generation Party-Christian Democratic	Partidul Noua Generație-Creștin Democrat (PNG-CD)	Active 2000–2022
Social Christian People's Union	Uniunea Populară Social Creștină (UPSC)	Active 2006–2021
Hungarian Civic Party	Partidul Civic Maghiar	Merged into the Hungarian Alliance of Transylvania; active 2008–2022
Hungarian People's Party of Transylvania	Partidul Popular Maghiar din Transilvania (PPMT)	Merged into the Hungarian Alliance of Transylvania; active 2011–2022
Alternative for National Dignity	Alternativa pentru Demnitate Națională (ADN)	Active 2018–2022
National Rebirth Alliance	Alianța Renașterea Națională (ARN)	Active 2019–2024, merged into the Romanian National Conservative Party
Communitarian Party of Romania	Partidul Comunitar din România (PCDR)	Active 2015–2022
"Prahova in Action" Party	Partidul Prahova în Acțiune	Active 2020–2022
Party of Ialomițans	Partidul Ialomițenilor (PI)	Active 2021–2022
Party of the Romanian Nation	Partidul Neamul Românesc (NR)	Active 2021–2022
RE:Start Romania Party	Partidul RE:Start Romania	Active 2020–2022
Republican Party of Romania	Partidul Republican din România	Active 2020–2022
Național Peasants' Party Maniu-Mihalache	Partidul Național Țărănesc Maniu-Mihalache (PNȚMM)	Active 2020–2022
ADER Party for Democracy, Education and Reconstruction	Partidul Ader la Democrație, Educație și Reconstrucție (ADER)	Active 2019–2022
Independent Union for Sighișoara	Uniunea Independentă pentru Sighișoara (UIPS)	Active 2020–2022
Phralipe Party of the Romania	Partidul Phralipe al Romilor (PPR)	Active 2020–2022
"Together for Moldova" Party	Partidul Impreuna pentru Moldova (IPM)	Active 2019–2022
Pătârlagele Initiative	Inițiativa Pătârlagele (iPTG)	Active 2020–2022
Bloc for National Unity	Blocul Unității Naționale (BUN)	Active 2020–2022
Liberal Right	Dreapta Liberală (DL)	Active 2019–2022
Christian Democratic Union of Romania	Uniunea Creștin-Democrată din România (UCDR)	Active 2021–2022
European Romania Party	Partidul România Europeană (PRE)	Active 2020–2022
PACT for Galați	PACT pentru Galați	Active 2021–2022
Banat Party	Partidul Banatului (PB)	Active 2018–2022
Union for Bucovina	Uniunea pentru Bucovina (UB)	Active 2019–2022
Our Otopeni Initiative	Inițiativa Otopeniul Nostru (ION)	Active 2020–2022
National Alliance for Farmers	Alianța Națională an Agricultorilor (ANA)	Active 2020–2022
Alliance for the Unity for Rroma	Alianța pentru Unitatea Rromilor (AURr)	Active 2021–2022
Romanian National Party	Partidul Național Român (PNR)	Active 2020–2022
"National Force" Party	Partidul Forța Națională (PFN)	Active 2020–2022
Bucureşti 2020 Party	Partidul Bucureşti 2020 (PB2020)	Active 2020–2024

== See also ==
- Politics of Romania
- List of political parties by country
