= Guard of the National Conscience =

Romanian workers' organization, 1919–1920

Guard of the National Conscience Garda Conștiinței Naționale
- Abbreviation: GCN
- Founder: Constantin Pancu
- Founded: 1919
- Dissolved: 1920
- Merged into: Brotherhood of the Cross
- Headquarters: Strada V. Alecsandri Nr. 3
- Newspaper: Conștiința (1919-1920)
- Membership: 40-100
- Ideology: Syncretic politics: National-Christian Socialism; Christian Nationalism; Nationalist Socialism; Anti-communism; Antisemitism; Monarchism; Irredentism
- Political position: Centre-right to far-right
- Religion: Romanian Orthodoxy
- Colors: Yellow
- Slogan: Muncitori de același sânge, uniți-vă în sindicate naționale profesionale! (Workers of the same blood, unite in national trade unions!) (Note: As opposed to the marxist slogan "Workers of the world, unite!")

Party flag

The Guard of the National Conscience (Romanian: Garda Conștiinței Naționale, GCN), also known as the Guard of the National Conscience of Romania (Romanian: Garda Conștiinței Naționale din România), was a government-backed, strikebreaking, nationalist, and anti-communist workers’ organization in the Kingdom of Romania, established in 1919. It was established to break socialist labor strikes, limit the spread of Bolshevism, and provide the working class with a nationalist alternative to socialist trade unions.

By definition, the GCN can be considered proto-fascist. Historian Oliver Schmitt argues that historical research has underestimated the importance of the GCN and its political platform in the development of Romanian fascism. Furthermore, the notorious Romanian antisemite and founder of the Legionary Movement, Corneliu Zelea Codreanu, was a member of the organization during his 20s, where he developed his leadership skills and ideological worldview. Schmitt describes the GCN as Codreanu’s "political school".

== History ==
=== Government backing and fear of a Bolshevik revolution ===
The Guard was generally active in Moldova and the recently annexed Bessarabia, supported by local branches of state-owned companies—such as the Căile Ferate Române (CFR)—which sought to diminish Bolshevik influence among Romanian workers and break socialist labor strikes. Initially supported by Ion I.C. Brătianu's liberal cabinets, in March 1920, like other reactionary groups, it won the tacit support of General Alexandru Averescu's second cabinet and his increasingly popular People's Party, of which A. C. Cuza, mentor of the Guard, became an affiliate. It also drew support from trade associations of the petite bourgeoisie and the Romanian Orthodox Church, sharing the same socio-ideological basis in conservatism, nationalism, and fear of a Bolshevik revolution.

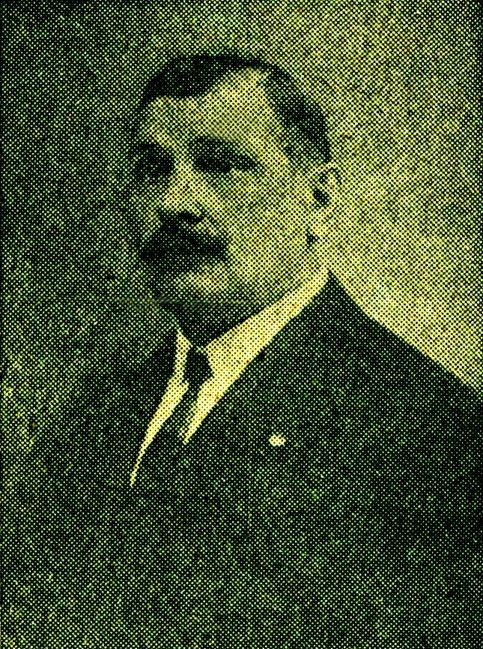
The only known photograph of Constantin Pancu, the leader of the organization.

The fear of a Bolshevik revolution began to take root in the Romanian society shortly after the Great War, especially among university students who came into contact with culturally Russified Bessarabians and Jews. Their open use of the Russian language and adoption of Russian fashion elements were equated by Romanian nationalists with symbols of a Bolshevik revolution.

In March 1919, the Hungarian Soviet Republic was established, placing Romania at risk of being outflanked by two Soviet states. Romanian troops subsequently occupied Budapest to dismantle Béla Kun's regime, while in the east the Russian Civil War continued until 1922. Soviet Russia refused to recognize Bessarabia's union with Romania, and Christian Rakovsky together with Georgy Chicherin sent ultimatums to the Romanian government demanding the evacuation of Romanian troops in Bessarabia and Bukovina. Later, Soviet Russia attempted to foment unrest in the region, the most notable event being the Tatarbunary uprising of 1924.

Massive worker demonstrations and strikes erupted between 1918 and 1920—some in solidarity with their counterparts in the Hungarian Soviet Republic and Soviet Russia—and the communist wing of the Socialist Party of Romania joined the Third International. The fear of the nationalists of Bolshevik subversion grew stronger with the arrival of Jewish refugees from Soviet Russia, while by January 1919, the Ministry of Interior encouraged right-wing radicalism as counter-revolutionary measure.

=== Membership ===
According to historian Francisco Veiga, Pancu's organization never exceeded 100 members (although its newspaper, Conștiința, claimed to have rallied over 2,000 supporters at its manifestations), yet it still carried out a frenetic level of activity. Veiga continued that it is difficult to determine the social composition of the movement, but according to Codreanu's memoirs, it was composed mainly of workers and student collaborators. On 27 October 1919, supporters of the Guard marched from the Cathederal to the University in Iași. Historian Oliver Schmitt argues that the meeting of these two critical points—the workers and the students—was of high symbolic significance for the nationalists’ self-perception.

=== Counter-revolutionary activity ===
In late 1919 and continuing throughout 1920, the Guard began engaging in strike-breaking and counter-revolutionary action in Iași, and supported the creation of "yellow" or "white" trade unions—essentially nationalist, anti-communist trade unions—which would replace the socialist ones. "The Guard of the National Conscience (thus is entitled the gang of parasites of the so-called ‘liberal’ kind) has begun to indulge in acts of direct provocation against the socialist organizations of Iași", wrote the left-leaning newspaper Socialismul (English: Socialism), in September 1919. Later in November that year, the Guard began indoctrinating the soldiers who had returned home at the end of the campaign against the Hungarian Soviet Republic, considering that they had to be protected from Bolshevik influence.

In the spring of 1920, work conflicts in Iași began intensifying, particularly because the strikers were supported by Nicolae Lupu, Minister of Interior in Alexandru Vaida Voevod's first cabinet and a left-leaning politician of the Peasants' Party. Beginning in February 1920, the Guard became significantly more active.

On 11 February 1920, the workers at the State Royal Monopolies tobacco factory went on strike. Nationalist workers clashed with socialist workers, and the portrait of King Ferdinand I had been replaced with portraits of Karl Marx, Leon Trotsky, and Christian Rakovsky (prominent leader of the Romanian communists). Before the Guard intervened to break the strike, a "yellow" trade union of nationalist workers was established at the factory, with its constitutive act signed by 184 of the 1,000 workers. Thus, the Guard’s strikebreakers, led by Codreanu, marched to the factory while singing patriotic songs. Codreanu climbed onto the factory and raised the Romanian flag, and the building was shortly thereafter occupied by the army.

On 10 March 1920, three days before the formation of Alexandru Averescu's second cabinet, the workers of the CFR in Nicolina town went on strike. On 27 April, the Guard, with massive support from the army, occupied the CFR warehouse in Nicolina, and Codreanu once again raised the Romanian flag over the building.

=== Merger ===
In March 1920, the Guard merged with the nationalist organization Frăția de Cruce (English: Brotherhood of the Cross)—not to be confused with the later Iron Guard youth units—led by Amos Frâncu and Liviu Ghilezan. The organization upheld and promoted similar ideological views as Pancu's, such as monarchism, and nationalism.

== Ideology ==
=== Origins of the GCN's "National-Christian Socialism" ===
National-Christian Socialism (Romanian: Socialism Național-Creștin) was the name under which the GCN presented its political platform.The idea of National-Christian Socialism was, however, not entirely indigenous; it borrowed heavily from other political currents in Western Europe. Among the main models from which the GCN’s ideology borrowed doctrinal elements were Karl Lueger, Mayor of Vienna, and his Christian Social Party; the Austrian social-democratic theoretician Otto Bauer; and the French Christian Socialists. Historian Francisco Veiga suggests that the GCN also drew inspiration from the German National Socialists. However, Codreanu notes in his memoirs that in 1919 he had not yet heard of them, a claim which historian Oliver Jens Schmitt considers entirely plausible.

=== Platform ===
The provisions of the GCN's National-Christian Socialist platform were published across various issues of its newspaper Conștiința (English: The Conscience). The most notable doctrinal work of the GCN was "The Creed of National-Christian Socialism" (Romanian: "Crezul Socialismului Național-Creștin"), published repeatedly in issues of the newspaper, beginning in 1919.

Economically, the GCN called for collective ownership of factories by the workers; a progressive tax system; distribution of benefits between the employer (state or private) and the workers; remuneration based on the number of children and the labor performed; land redistribution for the peasantry; development of peasant cottage industries; and, for private employers, in addition to the remuneration of their labor, a percentage decreasing in proportion to the size of the capital.

Socially and organizationally, the GCN advocated for a strong social welfare state for workers through a risk fund, warehouses for food and clothing, and asylums for the handicapped and the elderly; trade schools in rural areas; equal civil rights for men and women; the replacement of "internationalist" feminism with a "national" feminism; the replacement of socialist trade unions with national trade unions; the suspension of the Senate; and the election of ministers by the Chamber of Deputies.

== See also ==
- List of heads of government of Romania
- Bessarabian Soviet Socialist Republic
- 1920 Romanian general strike
- Kingdom of Romania under Fascism
- Iron Guard
