= Claudio Mutti =

Italian neofascist writer (born 1946)

Claudio Amin Mutti (born May 24, 1946) is an Italian far-right essayist. In the 1960s, he was a member of Young Italy (the juvenile wing of the Italian Social Movement, which expelled him for extremism) and the euro-nationalist Jeune Europe movement. In 1980 he was arrested in connection with the Bologna massacre, alongside fellow neofascist ideologues Paolo Signorelli and Aldo Semerari. He converted to Shia Islam in the 1980s, having become influenced by Julius Evola, René Guénon, Henry Corbin and Ruhollah Khomeini. He met with Aleksandr Dugin in 1990. Mark Sedgwick describes him as an important figure in late twentieth-century Traditionalist networks in Europe.

== Biography ==
Already as a very young man he joined the Italian Social Movement; being later expelled, he later joined Jean-François Thiriart's Jeune Europe, a Europeanist-nationalist movement in which Franco Cardini had also joined.

After the movement's crisis in 1969 he joined the Nazi-Maoist group Lotta di Popolo and in 1973 became president of the Italy-Libya Association. During those years he authored articles aimed at celebrating Muammar Gaddafi's Libyan socialism. In 1979 he authored another initiative: the Europe-Islam Association based in Venice.

He devoted himself to Finno-Ugric languages philology for many years, working as an assistant at the University of Bologna, becoming the author of some 30 articles and essays on Magyar folklore and Hungarian literature. He was also interested in the "political" use of language as an instrument of cultural hegemony, defining the English language as a superstructure of the hegemonic projection of the U.S. at the turn of the 20th and 21st century.

A connoisseur of Romanian language and culture, in 1979 he became the holder of a professorship at the Italian Cultural Institute in Bucharest, which was revoked following a parliamentary question by Hon. Antonello Trombadori, who asked the government "whether it was necessary to entrust a Nazi with the representation of Italian culture abroad." He translated and presented numerous documents of the Iron Guard and Corneliu Zelea Codreanu for Franco Freda's Edizioni di Ar. For the same publishing house he also published an annotated edition of The Protocols of the Elders of Zion, edits of works by Ferenc Szálasi and Ion Moța and anthologies of speeches by Muammar Gaddafi and Adolf Hitler.

Also interested in Muslim affairs, he directed, in the mid-1980s, the magazine Jihad, published in Italy and supported by the Iran embassy in Rome.

He founded the publishing house Edizioni all'Insegna del Veltro, in which he published studies on traditional symbolism, annotated translations of Greek philosophers, and studies of medieval and contemporary history. The publishing house's catalog includes authors such as Julius Evola, Corneliu Zelea Codreanu, Johann von Leers, René Guénon, Frithjof Schuon, Henry Corbin, Béla Hamvas, Werner Sombart, Drieu La Rochelle, Robert Brasillach, Karl Haushofer and Savitri Devi, as well as works by revisionist historian Robert Faurisson, and texts by "heretical" Marxist authors such as Constanzo Preve and Gennady Zyuganov.

Since 2004, he has been on the editorial staff of the Geopolitics journal Eurasia, of which he became the editor in December 2011. He taught Italian, History, Geography, Latin and Greek at the Liceo ginnasio statale Gian Domenico Romagnosi high school in Parma until 2010–2011.
