= Neo-Legionarism =

Neo-fascist movement in post-communist Romania

Neo-Legionarism (Romanian: Neolegionarism) is a neo-fascist movement in Romania that emerged in the 1990s following the fall of communism in the country. It is endorsed by a series of organizations that claim to be the successors of the Iron Guard (whose followers were known as "Legionaries") founded by Corneliu Zelea Codreanu in 1927. Its main characteristics include antisemitism, Eastern Orthodoxy, ethnic nationalism and mysticism.

In Romania, at present, the ideology of the movement seems to have moved away, to some extent, from the themes of the interwar period and seems to have focused on some neo-fascist themes, and the movement itself seems to have become more closely aligned with other forms of European and North American neo-fascism. Also, organized political movements with neo-legionary sympathies have already emerged at a national level. Moreover, there is a favorable ground for the emergence and development of such a movement at the local level, due to both objective historical factors and current socio-economic and political conditions.

Links between neo-Legionary organizations and priests of the Romanian Orthodox Church are a documented phenomenon in Romania. Neo-Legionarism has kept the "prison saints" movement active. Although officially neutral, as an influential political actor with a clear nationalist orientation, it shares significant overlap with concepts associated with neo-Legionarism and has personal, ideological and practical links with the neo-legionary movement, without these being official or systematic. In 2014, a monk at Petru Vodă Monastery in Neamț County delivered a pro-Iron Guard sermon, prompting the church hierarchy to condemn him. Earlier, a group of nuns had sung the Legionary tune Sfânta tinerețe legionară ("Holy Legionary Youth") for the birthday of prominent monk Iustin Pârvu.

Although those associated with the phenomenon are currently most active online, the phenomenon is likely to gain momentum over the medium term, particularly because it has historical precedents and an established tradition, neo-Legionary ideology is discussed in Romanian public life, neo-Legionarism overlaps considerably with other nationalist and religious discourses in the country, a pro-Legionary Orthodoxist orientation persists within the Romanian Orthodox Church, and there are foreign countries interested in fostering this type of phenomenon. The risk of Romania shifting toward extreme political manifestations of a neo-Legionary nature is by no means negligible, as neo-Legionary propaganda has already found a channel of communication into the Romanian Parliament.

Romania has the legal framework necessary to combat the phenomenon, embodied in Government Emergency Ordinance No. 31/2002. However, its inadequate implementation is attributed to a lack of prosecutors prepared to deal with all the complexities of the neo-Nazi phenomenon. As for combating the phenomenon itself, this requires broad cooperation, for which both the necessary theoretical foundations and mechanisms for inter-institutional cooperation must first be established, between public institutions and civil society, as well as among researchers, the mass media, social media, and the public.

Noua Dreaptă ("New Right") and the Everything For the Country Party have been described as neo-Legionary. The latter was founded in 1993 and drew support from members of the original Iron Guard. The Alliance for the Union of Romanians has also been associated with this current, although its leaders have denied any such connection, and so has been the United Romania Party by Vice.

== Background ==
In Romania, the Legionary movement experienced an aggressive resurgence after the 1989 Romanian Revolution. This occurred in a context in which a sober assessment of Legionaryism had, up to the present (2019), remained an ill-defined undertaking pursued by only a handful of historians. Over time, Legionary memoirs and the published pro-Legionary nostalgic and laudatory literature came to far outnumber works offering an objective analysis of the Legionary utopia. This contributed to the whitewashing of Legionaryism, as well as to the emergence of a growing pro-Legionary current that drew upon it. Efforts to rehabilitate the interwar Iron Guard were made through publications, books and public appearances not only by neo-legionaries, but also by post-communist nationalist leaders.

== Evolution ==
=== Revival ===
They are generally regarded as neo-Legionary groups, nationalist organizations that emerged after 1989 and took the interwar Legionary Movement as their model. Some of these groups even declared themselves successors to the Legion of the Archangel Michael and promoted the principles advocated by Corneliu Zelea Codreanu. Followers of the Movement who were either abroad or had business interests in Romania supported such groups.

It is worth noting that the continued existence of the interwar Legionary Movement in exile during the Cold War was an important factor both in its revival in its country of origin and in its subsequent development. Veteran Legionaries from the interwar period played a significant role in the revival of the movement after 1989. Some groups and nests were named after these veterans, while their eventful biographies inspired young neo-Legionaries during the 1990s.

The former Legionaries living in exile also provided, in addition to financial support, an ideological and historical platform, as well as an organizational apparatus directly connected to the movement's original structure. Former Legionaries who had survived in Romania likewise contributed to the revival of the movement.

=== The first post-communist decade ===
In the first post-communist decade, the neo-Legionaries organized themselves into a network of loosely interconnected groups and individuals. The neo-Legionaries actively used symbols from the interwar period, when the Legionary Movement was a mass movement. In the struggle over authenticity, continuity, and definitions, the term “Legionary” continued to be used, although, according to Cecilie Endersen, the term and its derivatives are now somewhat imprecise.

In the 1990s, although the neo-Legionary phenomenon was distinctive, it remained marginal and lacked systematic interconnections. Among the obstacles were the absence of a power base within the communist system, from which the individuals who dominated Romanian politics during that decade had emerged, the partially illegal character of the movement, and the inability of its members to unite or cooperate. These were compounded by mutual suspicions that the authorities had infiltrated the movement, as well as by the lack of a vigorous and charismatic leader. In this context, the prospect of financial support may have encouraged cooperation.

As a result of the conditions under which the neo-Legionary movement emerged, its demographic profile at the end of the second millennium was characterized by a majority of members being either 20 or 80 years old. The middle generations were absent, having been rejected by the neo-Legionaries as spiritually corrupt because of their ties to communism.
The absence of the middle generation, however, tended to diminish during the 2000s.

=== 2000s ===
A large part of the neo-Legionary groups consider each other to be subversive and challenge each other's legitimacy and authenticity. Nevertheless, their allegedly irreconcilable ideological differences are in fact minimal, compared to the broader body of ideas associated with Legionaryism.

According to Cecilie Endersen, although the network of neo-Legionary groups and figures in Romania is weakly interconnected, its members nevertheless adhere to a common set of symbols and objectives, which is why it could be said since 2010 that a neo-Legionary movement already existed. The activism of its members had become evident since the early 2000s. In the early 2010s, however, many Romanians believed that the revived Legionary movement was being directed by the Romanian Intelligence Service. Although the neo-Legionary presence found legal ways through which to operate, its political activity was largely confined to activities of the kind normally associated with civil society organizations. Thus, the neo-Legionary movement made use of its own publications, including books, periodicals, other written works, brochures, posters, and websites. Legionary texts were republished, including interwar writings, biographies, and historical works by expatriate Legionaries.

Among the interwar Legionary texts, some acquired canonical status, including The Book of the Nest Chief (Cărticica Șefului de Cuib) and For the Legionnaires (Pentru legionari), both written by Corneliu Zelea Codreanu, as well as The Testament (Testamentul) by Ion I. Moța.

By publishing regularly in nationalist magazines, some members of the groups enjoyed gained considerable visibility in the public space. There were also neo-Legionary groups that gained popularity, particularly among young people, and put forward political projects based on nationalist or even anti-Semitic ideas.

Already since the 2000s, the movement's ideology appears to have become focused on neo-fascist themes, such as the expulsion of immigrants and anti-homosexual and anti-abortion propaganda. Violent demonstrations were organized, associated with the promotion of a certain type of public profile linked to gay parades, and stories began to emerge of neo-Legionaries attacking human rights activists. In turn, the Internet revolution brought about a radical change in the way neo-Legionary information was disseminated, making it much more readily accessible. The Internet also facilitated collaboration with extremists abroad and, likewise, encouraged their influence on Romanian neo-Legionaryism. Moreover, according to Cecilie Endresen, the Internet may have contributed to changing the social structure of the movement by strengthening its internal networks. Although some nostalgic veterans and those belonging to its mystical, occult, and folkloric fringes became alienated from the movement, it attracted new sympathizers and became more unified, drawing closer to other forms of European and North American neo-fascism. The emergence, at the national level, of organized political movements sympathetic to neo-Legionaryism represented a sign of a transition to a higher level of organization among sympathizers of neo-Legionary ideas, as well as an enlargement of the membership base and affiliations with such ideas.

It is worth noting that, from the 1990s until the emergence of the Prison Saints movement, the Legionary current existing in contemporary Romanian society was perceived as a nostalgic form of protest, without political meaning and without any prospects. However, the gradual “normalization” of the presence of fascist symbols in society developed insidiously, against a backdrop of post-communist mass culture conducive to far-right ideologies, anti-Semitism, and xenophobia, together with a weak state response. Moreover, the Legionaries appropriated, through the support of their own memory entrepreneurs, civil society discourses concerning communist crimes, the anti-communist resistance, and dissidence, which sought to provide a coherent account of this neglected chapter of Romanian history. Thus, contrary to the official evidence, which identified them as having played a minor role, the Legionaries claimed, and continue to claim, that their movement represented the principal anti-communist force and that their comrades were the main victims of communism.

=== 2010s ===
In the mid-2010s, the movement to glorify the Prison Saints gained considerable momentum, beginning to receive support from state institutions. In this context, entrepreneurs of Legionary memory sought, drawing on the fact that some of the victims had been Legionaries, to promote the idea that the Legion was a movement of national martyrs. The support extended to the Prison Saints movement thus became, for Romania’s far right at the time, a means of normalizing within society the messages of intolerance espoused by this political movement.

This effort had the potential to ensure the future of organized intolerance in Romania.

=== 2020s ===
At the beginning of the 2020s, it became apparent that Romania was experiencing a clear trend toward normalizing the presence of groups associated with the organized intolerance characteristic of the far right. The distortion of the discourse surrounding the communist past, together with efforts to reclaim Romanian historical memory, serves both to create an image in which the Legion of the Archangel Michael appears to be the victim of malevolent forces and to manipulate the state’s policy of restoring historical memory, as well as to promote the idea that the Legion was a movement of martyrs. Historical contextualization thus tends to be undertaken in a way that omits the Legionary Movement’s own criminal past from the formation of cultural memory.

Violence as a political strategy within Romania’s far-right movements appears to be approached in a mixed manner, with some members of the far right (such as Diana Șoșoacă, Sorin Lavric or George Simion) seemingly opting for electoral politics, in contrast to the strategy employed by representatives of these movements in the 2000s. According to Mihai Rapcea (member of the The New Right), one argument for the desirability of this change in approach is that Romanian society does not take kindly to violence and, consequently, other means of bringing extremist ideas into the political mainstream and society need to be tried.

However, against the backdrop of the radicalization of Romanian society, which has entered a legal political trajectory with the far-right Alliance for the Union of Romanians entering the Romanian Parliament, as well as the election of several MPs holding similar views, there has nevertheless been an increase in the appetite for violence and physical confrontation, particularly among young people aged between 17 and 25. Ideologically influenced by Legionary or Nazi ideas, either by neo-Legionary foundations or through influences from abroad, these young people become promoters of extremism, particularly through social media platforms such as Telegram or Instagram. In this context, their participation in neo-Legionary events is legitimized both through the issuance of protest permits and through the presence at such events of senators from the Alliance for the Union of Romanians and others who hold similar beliefs.

Political science professor Liliana Popescu assessed in 2021 that there was a visible trend in Romania towards promoting an aggressive form of discourse, associated with the risk of shifting towards extreme political manifestations of a neo-Legionary nature, although many considered extremist manifestations in Romania to be marginal. According to researcher Mădălin Hodor, however, the current period has nevertheless become one in which neo-Legionary propaganda has found a channel of communication into Parliament.

The first round of the 2024 presidential elections was won, with 22,94%, by independent sovereigntist Călin Georgescu. He had previously made several favourable statements about Legionary figures, including Corneliu Zelea Codreanu, but subsequently rejected accusations that he was neo-Legionary or politically extremist.

== Classification ==
According to Cecilie Endersen, the neo-Legionary movement is a political movement with a religious ideological structure that integrates conceptions of nationalism and mysticism into a coherent mythology, characterized by particular symbolism and a set of rituals. Neo-Legionarism can be viewed as a form of religious nationalism and, at the same time, as an Orthodox lay movement with a strong political bias. The religious tradition is thus reinterpreted and comes to include dogmas, rituals, texts, and new martyrs, alongside charismatic leaders, while neo-Legionaries tend to claim that part of the religious establishment has abandoned the right path.

Neo-Legionarism represents a form of fascism, although many neo-Legionaries reject this label as a result of the Communists’ categorization of the Legionary Movement as fascist. Neo-Legionarism has notable points of convergence with religious fundamentalism, a similarity that neo-Legionaries accept. They express social and political grievances in religious terms and view the world as a spiritual battlefield. From their point of view, the society that ought to be created is one in which God’s plan is to be implemented. Fundamentalists reject the ideological implications of modernity, feeling themselves to be under attack by liberal-secular humanism. An idealized past is used to identify their own community as pure.

The religious fanaticism of neo-Legionaries is rooted in the religious fanaticism of the Legionaries and is based, in its development, on the principles and ideology of the Romanian Legion of the Archangel Michael. It is characterized by an exacerbated religiosity of Orthodox origin, which extrapolates fundamental ideas, such as family, community, faith, nation, and the people. It thus belongs to the sphere of Christian Orthodox nationalism. This Romanian neo-Legionary fanaticism manifests itself today in an apparently atypical manner, not in Romania but in the United States, where exponents of the far right have adopted it.

== Ideological perceptions ==
New legionaries are convinced that the Romanian nation was set on the right path during the interwar era, by Corneliu Zelea Codreanu, and that this era, regarded as the movement's "golden age", was interrupted because "the Antichrist was transformed into communism, the mortal enemy of the Church". In accordance with the statement of Codreanu, that "as long as there is at least one Legionary, the Legion exists", new legionaries maintain that the Legionary spirit has not yet died. The cult of Codreanu, who was said to have experienced a revelation of the Archangel Michael, the strategist of God's armies against the forces of Lucifer, is a central element of neo-Legionary groups. In this context, the figure of the archangel functions as a political agent, reflecting the belief held by many neo-Legionaries that the battle described in the Apocalypse is already taking place on Earth. Thus, portraits of Codreanu appear in neo-Legionary publications and at their events, while the dates of his birth and death are observed as days of commemoration. Neo-Legionary interpretations on him vary, being categorized as either as a hero, a national leader, or an embodiment of the divine will in the struggle between Good and Evil, remaining present despite his physical death.

The worldview of the neo-Legionary movement is characterized by a mixture of mysticism, Orthodox Christianity, Romanian folklore, fascism, ethnic nationalism and antisemitism, while its religious-political discourse is based largely on a pre-communist ideology, which distinguishes it from other forms of fascism. The neo-Legionary system of political and religious ideas is underpinned by conspiracy theories, the neo-Legionary mission consisting of cleansing Romania of the malevolent forces of a powerful conspiracy, a source of an existential crisis, morally and spiritual, which is portrayed as the source of an existential, spiritual, and moral crisis that gives rise to political, economic, and social problems. According to neo-Legionaries, the means of regenerating the community and the nation are found in the esoteric knowledge inherited from Corneliu Zelea Codreanu and subsequently transmitted by the interwar Legionary elite. This total mythical regeneration from the ashes of a degenerate society cannot take place without sacrifices.

The cleansing of the country and the restoration of order must be accompanied by the creation of a new Romania, corresponding to interwar Greater Romania. This, an outright divine entity, will be "beautiful, strong and obedient to God", the natural home of an organic Romanian nation. Once the nation has been purified and reborn, a spiritual revolution is necessary, through which the "new man" must live his life according to the "mysticism of the Romanian nation", so that they may serve God and the nation. The moral soldiers, as the ruling elite, will bring about the disappearance of misery and corruption.

Neo-Legionaries consider the Romanian nation to be continuously under attack by malicious forces and their allies from other groups, who constantly plot to “kill the best among Christians.” The usual suspects are Jews, Freemasons, and communists, joined by global anti-Christian circles. This existential struggle, in which neo-Legionaries thus become soldiers of Christ and representatives of the fundamental (and at the same time divine) interests of the nation, entails “exposing” various enemies. This list is updated in comparison with that of the interwar Legion. Thus, human rights, the “genocide” allegedly caused by democracy, and “internationalism” are added to the list of enemies. Internationalism, they claim, “globalizes the nation and destroys the Romanian borders”. In practice, the list of various threats is far from exhaustive, including the United Nations, NATO, the European Union, global telecommunications, international companies, African immigrants, Body Shop, homosexuals, abortion, drugs, crime, Muslims, ethnic minorities, anarchy, corruption, communist historiography, and urban planning. With the exception of traditional Orthodox Christianity, all religious phenomena are supposedly manifestations of “religious obscurantism” that leads to a “spiritual Armageddon”. Likewise, Protestantism, neo-Protestant denominations, the New Age movement, magic and occultism, as well as Yoga, humanism, atheism, secularism, ecumenism, syncretism, and individualism, are financed and controlled by global anti-Christian, Freemason, and Jewish circles.

== See also ==
- Neo-Nazism
