= Union for Romanian Reconstruction =

Union for Romanian Reconstruction Uniunea pentru Reconstrucția României
- Abbreviation: URR
- President: Cosmin Alexandru
- Secretary-General: Diana Calfa
- Founded: 27 February 2002
- Dissolved: 10 March 2006
- Merged into: Christian Democratic National Peasants' Party
- Ideology: Christian democracy Liberalism
- Political position: Centre-right

Uniunea pentru Reconstrucția României (URR; Union for Romanian Reconstruction) was a Romanian centre-right political party active during the early 2000s. The party described itself as combining Christian democracy and liberalism, while emphasizing pragmatism, political participation, individual responsibility and institutional reform.

== History ==
The origins of the URR dated to the period following the 2000 Romanian presidential election. According to a party history document, the group's political activity developed from a consulting group established in 1999. The group subsequently decided to participate directly in politics and established the URR. The party was officially registered on 27 February 2002. Cosmin Alexandru became its president, while Diana Calfa served as general secretary. Other members of the early leadership included Adrian Pop and Mihaela Vincze. By August 2003, the URR reported that it had established 18 local organizations and initiative groups. The party also stated that it had collected more than 32,000 signatures in connection with its registration, with approximately 75% of the signatories being between 18 and 35 years old. In December 2003, the party held its First National Convention, where it adopted a political programme covering 18 policy areas and discussed its strategy for the 2004 Romanian local elections. The URR participated in the 2004 Romanian elections. On 10 March 2006, the URR was merged by absorption into the Christian Democratic National Peasants' Party (PNȚCD). The merger was recorded in the official register of political parties maintained by the Bucharest Tribunal.

== Ideology and political position ==
The URR characterized itself as a centre-right party combining Christian democracy and liberalism. Rather than presenting itself around a rigid ideological doctrine, the party placed particular emphasis on pragmatism as a guiding principle of political activity. The party's stated objective was the restoration of what it described as "normality" in Romanian public life. It advocated policies based on clearly defined objectives and practical measures rather than what it regarded as ideological or improvised reforms. The principles emphasized by the party included: * individual freedom and responsibility; * political participation; * economic initiative; * institutional efficiency; * combating corruption; * equality before public institutions; * civic involvement; and * pragmatism in public policy. The party used the slogan "Fiecare contează" ("Everyone counts").

== Institutional reform and anti-corruption policies ==
The URR proposed reforms to Romania's political institutions. Among its proposals were reducing the number of parliamentarians, introducing a form of compensated single-member voting, increasing transparency in parliamentary voting and limiting parliamentary immunity to political statements. The party also proposed measures intended to prevent conflicts of interest among public officials. These included public declarations of the assets of officials and their first-degree relatives at several stages of their public careers, restrictions on certain business relationships involving officials and the state, and greater transparency concerning political parties' finances.

== Organisation ==
The URR presented itself as an organization based on competence and active participation rather than mass membership. Its 2003 materials stated that membership required active involvement in party activities. The party's internal code of conduct contained ten principles, including freedom to express one's own opinions, responsibility for one's actions, respect among members, prioritization of common interests, refusal of improper material benefits, personal initiative, acceptance of acknowledged mistakes, focusing criticism on solutions, pragmatism and sharing power with capable colleagues. The party also emphasized ethnic inclusiveness. Its 2003 presentation noted that the presidents of its Constanța and Cluj organizations were respectively of Tatar and Hungarian minority backgrounds.

== Leadership ==
Position	Name
President	Cosmin Alexandru
General Secretary	Diana Calfa
Vice-presidents	Adrian Pop; Mihaela Vincze

The composition of the party leadership changed during its existence.

== See also ==
- Politics of Romania
- List of political parties in Romania
- Christian Democratic National Peasants' Party
