= Social Justice Party (Romania) =

Social Justice Party Partidul Justiției Sociale
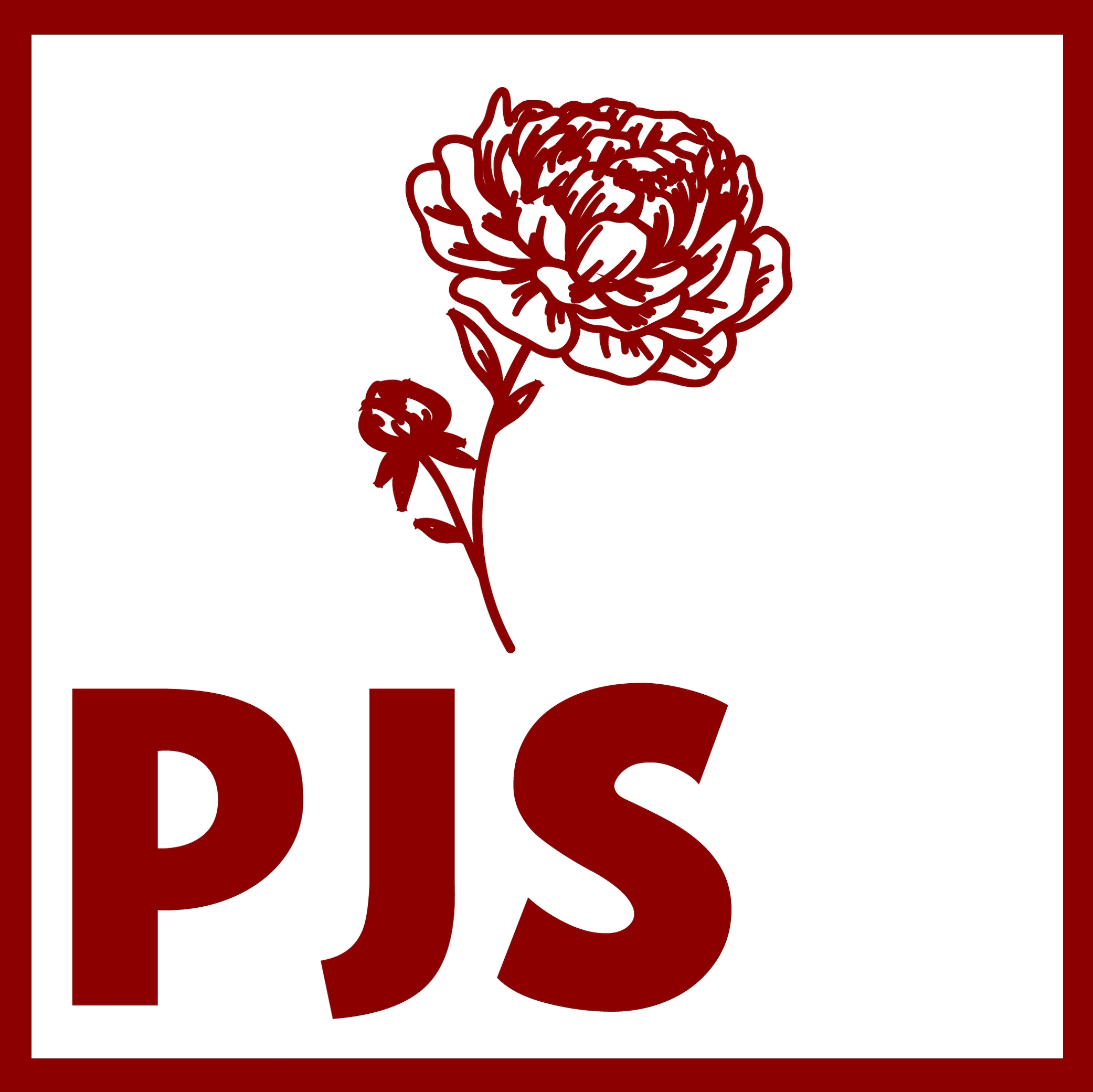
- Abbreviation: PJS
- Founder: Bogdan Frîncu
- Founded: 7 May 2025
- Ideology: Social democracy Anti-austerity; Populism
- Political position: Centre-left to left-wing
- European Parliament group: Progressive Alliance of Socialists and Democrats (intention to join)
- Slogan: Gândește liber (lit. 'Think freely')

Website
- https://www.pjs.ro/

The Social Justice Party (Romanian: Partidul Justiției Sociale, PJS) is a left-wing political party in Romania founded in 2025 by Senate employee and anti-austerity activist Bogdan Cătălin Frîncu.
