= For My Legionaries =

1936 book by Corneliu Zelea Codreanu

For My Legionaries (Romanian: Pentru legionarii mei) is an autobiographical book by Iron Guard leader Corneliu Zelea Codreanu first published in 1936. The book has been described by historian Irina Livezeanu as being to Codreanu what Mein Kampf was to Adolf Hitler. It was first published in Sibiu, as it was not allowed to pass censorship in Bucharest.

The book is a first-person narrative describing Codreanu's leadership role in a series of political movements, "The Guard of the National Conscience", "League of National Christian Defence", "the Legion of the Archangel Michael", and finally, the Iron Guard. His goal within these movements was to defend the newly established Greater Romania against a set of enemies, particularly, the Soviet Union. The narratives are interspersed with quotations from Romanian intellectuals, as well as clippings from contemporary newspapers.

Codreanu makes clear in his book that his ideology is not compatible with the liberal democratic institutions. He loathed the elections and the parliamentary system and he considered his movement to be part of a greater family of ultra-nationalist ideologies, which included Italian Fascism and German Nazism.
