= Everything For the Country Party =

Everything For the Country Party Partidul Totul Pentru Țară
- President: Virgil Totoescu
- General Secretary: Florin Dobrescu
- Executive President: Cătălin Maghiar
- Founded: 30 January 1993 (As the "For the Fatherland" Party)
- Banned: 2015
- Headquarters: Str. Veseliei Nr.21; Sector 5 Bucharest
- Membership (2014): 5,000
- Ideology: Romanian ultranationalism Neo-Legionarism
- Political position: Far-right
- Religion: Romanian Orthodox Christianity
- Slogan: Unitate! Credință! Acțiune! (Unity! Faith! Action!)

Party flag

Website
- Partidul Totul Pentru Țară

The Everything for the Country Party (Romanian: Partidul Totul Pentru Țară, TPT) was a far-right political party founded in Romania in 1993. It was founded by former members of the fascist Iron Guard from the interwar period, which also referred to itself as Everything for the Country (Romanian: Totul Pentru Țară) from 1935 onwards. It existed until it was banned in 2015. The party claimed to adhere to a "national-Christian" doctrine and styled itself as the successor to the party of the same name.

As it claimed the legacy of Corneliu Zelea Codreanu and other fascist figureheads from the interwar era, the TPT has been described as "Neo-Legionary". The Noua Dreaptă, another far-right and Neo-Legionary organisation, has its roots in a faction that split ways with the TPT leadership around 2000.

In May 2015, the party was banned, both because of its neofascist character and because it failed repeatedly to obtain the legally required minimum of 50.000 votes.

== Leadership ==
- President: Virgil Totoescu (Suceava) - teacher, member of an armed militia connected to the Romanian anti-communist resistance movement, for which he served a prison sentence from 1948 to 1964. Responsible for the Moldova region.
- Executive President: Cătălin Maghiar (Galați) - PhD Professor, degree in History.
- Vice President (Bucharest Metropolitan Area): Corneliu Suliman (Bucharest) - constructor, entrepreneur, formerly also imprisoned because of armed anti-communist militancy.
- Vice-president (Transylvania-Banat area): C. Baciu - lawyer, economist, PhD in law.
- Vice-president (South area): Răzvan A. (Bucharest) - engineer.
- Secretary-General: Florin Dobrescu (Bucharest) - professor, degree in geography.

== Prominent members ==
The party counted a number of well-known Romanian personalities among its members, including Iron Youth leader Ion Gavrilă Ogoranu who went on to lead an anti-communist paramilitary insurgency in the Făgăraș Mountains after World War II; actor Ernest Maftei who was convicted in his youth for his militant activities in the Iron Guard; former dissident Mircea Nicolau; wood sculptor Nicolae Purcarea; biochemist Ion Brad; priest and former dissident Constantin Voicescu; priest and historian Dumitru Balaşa, etc.
