= Ecologist Union of Romania Party =

Ecologist Union of Romania Party Partidul Uniunea Ecologistă din România
- Founded: March 31, 2012
- Dissolved: August 23, 2012
- Merged into: Ecologist Party of Romania
- Headquarters: Calea Dudeşti nr. 182; Sector 3 Bucharest
- Ideology: Green politics
- Colors: Green

The Ecologist Union of Romania Party (Partidul Uniunea Ecologistă din România) was a short-lived political party in Romania, active between March and August 2012. It claimed to be a "civic-political structure striving to find the best solutions for the economic, social, and ecological problems" in Romania. In the run-up to the December 2012 parliamentary elections, it merged into the Ecologist Party of Romania.
