= Social Christian People's Union =

Social Christian People's Union Uniunea Populară Social Creștină
- President: Stelian Sima
- Secretary-General: Gheorghe Iancu
- Founder: Ioan Talpeș
- Founded: October 22, 2006
- Headquarters: Str. Verii nr. 8 Sector 2 Bucharest
- Ideology: Christian democracy
- Political position: Centre-right

Website
- http://uniuneapopulara.blogspot.ro/

The Social Christian People's Union (Romanian: Uniunea Populară Social Creștină) was a political party in Romania.
