= Francisco Veiga =

Spanish historian, journalist and writer

- Francisco José Veiga Rodríguez
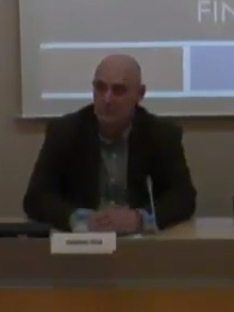
- Born: 1958 (age 67–68); Madrid, Spain
- Occupations: Historian, writer
- Board member of: Professor at the Department of Contemporary History at the Autonomous University of Barcelona (UAB)

Academic work
- Era: Interwar period, Cold War, Post-Cold War, Arab Spring, Russian Revolution, Balkans, Turkey
- Main interests: Middle East, Oriental studies, Eurasia, Yugoslav Wars, History of Turkey
- Notable works

Francisco José Veiga Rodríguez (born 1958 in Madrid) is a Spanish historian, journalist and writer. He is a doctor and professor in the Department of Contemporary History at the Autonomous University of Barcelona (UAB), where he has been a professor since 1983, with a focus on Eastern Europe, the countries of the former Soviet Union, the countries of the Balkan Peninsula and Turkey. He is an author of newspaper articles for El Periódico de Catalunya and El País.

== Biography ==
His historiographical production has dealt with subjects such as the Interwar period (1918–1939), the Cold War (1948–1991), the "Post-Cold War" (1991–2008), the theory of the crises arose after the fall of the Ottoman Empire and the resurgence of nationalism and the extreme right. He has written articles for the newspaper Avui (1987–1989), El Observador de la Actualidad (1990–1993) and above all for the El Periódico and El País, where he has been publishing various chronicles on the Romanian revolution of 1989, the Yugoslav Wars (1991–2001), the political transition in the Balkan Peninsula and in Turkey, discussing latter's candidacy as a candidate for the enlargement of the European Union. He is also co-author of a study on the Arab Spring through his experience in Yemen, of a history of the Russian Revolution and has coordinated a collective work on the new role of Eurasia in world geostrategy.

== Work ==
=== Essays and studies ===
- Veiga, F. (1982). El fascismo en Rumanía y la Guardia de Hierro. Ateneu Barcelonès. Secció d'Història i Geografia.
- Veiga, F. (1989). La Mística del ultranacionalismo: (historia de la Guardia de Hierro), Rumania, 1919-1941. ISBN 978-84-7488-497-5.
- Veiga, F. (1993). Els Balcans: la desfeta d'un somni, 1945-1991. Eumo. ISBN 978-84-7602-808-7.
- Veiga, F. (1995). La trampa balcánica: una crisis europea de fin de siglo. Grijalbo. ISBN 978-84-253-2793-3.
- Ucelay da Cal, Enric; Veiga, Francisco (1994). El fin del segundo milenio: (un siglo de miedos apocalípticos, 1814-1989) (in Spanish). Planeta. ISBN 978-84-320-9492-7.
- Veiga, F.; Duarte, Angel; Ucelay da Cal, Enric (1996). La Paz Simulada: una historia de la guerra fría 1941-1991. Alianza Editorial. ISBN 978-84-206-4827-9.
- Veiga, F. (2004). Slobo: una biografía no autorizada de Milošević (in Spanish). Random House Mondadori. ISBN 978-84-8306-567-9.
- Veiga, F. (2019). El turco. Debate. ISBN 978-84-8306-670-6.
- Veiga, F. (2015). El desequilibrio como orden. Una historia de la Posguerra Fría, 1990-2008. Alianza Editorial. ISBN 978-84-206-9928-8.
- Veiga, F. (2011). La Fábrica de las Fronteras, Guerras de Secesión Yugoslavas 1991-2001. Alianza Editorial. ISBN 978-84-206-6407-1.
- Veiga, F.; Hamad Zahonero, Leyla; Ignacio, Gutiérrez de Terán (2014). Yemen. La clave olvidada del mundo árabe. Alianza Editorial. ISBN 978-84-206-8589-2.
- Veiga, F.; Martín, Pablo (2014). Las guerras de la Gran Guerra (1914-1923). Catarata. ISBN 978-84-8319-888-9.
- Veiga, F.; Juan, Sánchez Monroe; Martín, Pablo (2017). Entre dos octubres. Alianza Editorial. ISBN 978-84-9104-674-5.
- Veiga, F.; Forti, Steven; Moles, Jelena; González-Villa, Carlos (2019). Patriotas indignados. Alianza Editorial. ISBN 978-84-9181-722-2.

== Bibliography ==
- Pérez Ayala, Andoni (2013). "Francisco Veiga: La fábrica de las fronteras. Guerras de secesión yugoslavas 1991-2001; Alianza Editorial, Madrid, 2011 págs". La Alternativa al Funcionalismo y al Marxismo: La Sociología del Estado de Birnbaum (160). Madrid: Revista de Estudios Político, Centro de Estudios Políticos y Constitucionales: 241–254. ISSN 0048-7694.
- Sahagún, Felipe [in Spanish] (10 February 2012). "La fábrica de las fronteras". El Cultural.
- Soto, Antoni (1995–1996). "Francisco Veiga. La trampa balcánica. Una crisis europea de fin de siglo. (Barcelona, 1995)". Boletín de la Real Academia de Buenas Letras de Barcelona. 45. Barcelona: Real Academia de Buenas Letras de Barcelona: 548–550. ISSN 2340-3233.
- Carmona Pascual, Pablo (November–December 2020). "Patriotas indignados, Europa como fantasma". Nueva Sociedad. Democracia y Política en América Latina.
- Boix, Eduardo (2 December 2020). "Reflejo de nuestros días=". Información.
