= Corneliu Zelea Codreanu =

Romanian fascist politician (1899–1938)

Căpitanul Corneliu Zelea Codreanu
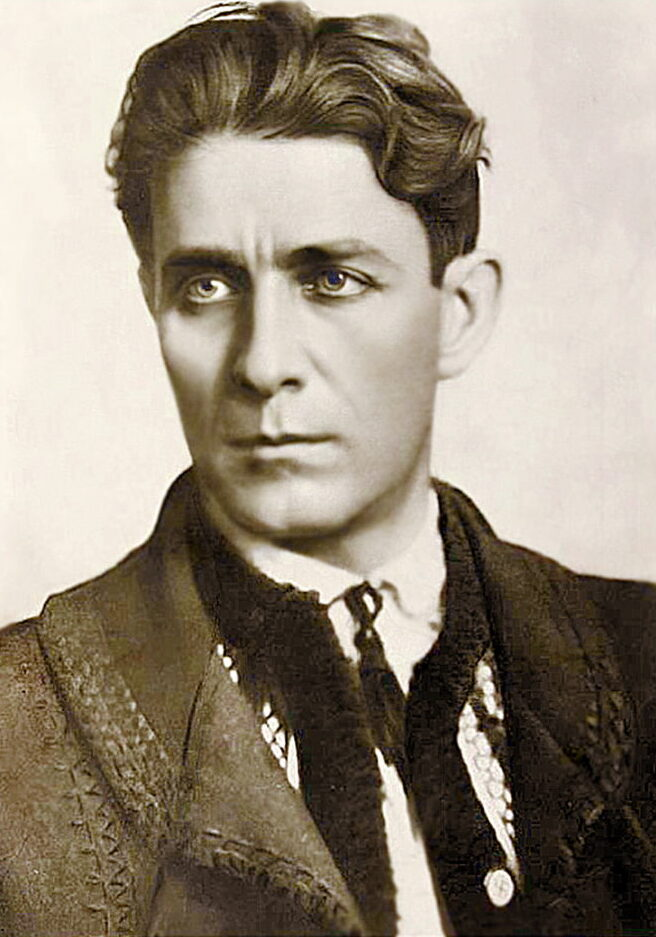
- A photo of Codreanu (year unknown).

Captain of the Iron Guard
- In office 24 June 1927 – May 1938
- Succeeded by: Horia Sima (as "Commander")

Member of the Assembly of Deputies
- In office August 1932 – November 1933

Personal details
- Born: Corneliu Zelinski; 13 September 1899 Huși, Kingdom of Romania
- Died: 30 November 1938 (aged 39) Tâncăbești, Snagov, Ilfov County, Kingdom of Romania
- Cause of death: Extrajudicial execution
- Resting place: Jilava, Ilfov County, Romania (1938–1940); Green House, Bucharest, Romania (1940–?); Unknown (present)
- Party: National-Christian Defense League (1923–1927); Iron Guard (1927–1938)
- Spouse: Elena Ilinoiu (m. 1925–1938)
- Education: Alexandru Ioan Cuza University; University of Grenoble
- Occupation: Politician
- Profession: Lawyer
- Known for: Founder and Leader of the Legionary Movement
- Books: For My Legionaries
- Religion: Romanian Orthodox

Corneliu Zelea Codreanu (Note: Although "Zelea" is in fact a surname, not a middle name, dictionary entries generally refer to Codreanu as "Codreanu, Corneliu Zelea".) (Romanian: [korˈnelju ˈzele̯a koˈdre̯anu]; 13 September 1899 – 30 November 1938), born Corneliu Zelinski and commonly known as Corneliu Codreanu, was a fascist Romanian politician, the founder and charismatic leader of the Iron Guard or The Legion of the Archangel Michael (also known as the Legionary Movement), an ultranationalist and violently antisemitic organization active throughout most of the interwar period. Generally seen as the main variety of local fascism, and noted for its mystical and Romanian Orthodox–inspired revolutionary message, the Iron Guard gained prominence on the Romanian political stage, coming into conflict with the political establishment and the democratic forces, and often resorting to terrorism. The Legionnaires traditionally referred to Codreanu as Căpitanul ("The Captain"), and he held absolute authority over the organization until his death.

Codreanu, who began his career in the wake of World War I as an anticommunist and antisemitic agitator associated with A. C. Cuza and Constantin Pancu, was a co-founder of the National-Christian Defense League and assassin of the Iași Police prefect Constantin Manciu. Codreanu left Cuza to found a succession of movements on the far right, rallying around him a growing segment of the country's intelligentsia and peasant population, and inciting pogroms in various parts of Greater Romania. Several times outlawed by successive Romanian cabinets, his Legion assumed different names and survived in the underground, during which time Codreanu formally delegated leadership to Gheorghe Cantacuzino-Grănicerul. Following Codreanu's instructions, the Legion carried out assassinations of politicians it viewed as corrupt, including Premier Ion G. Duca and his former associate Mihai Stelescu. Simultaneously, Corneliu Zelea Codreanu advocated Romania's adherence to a military and political alliance with Nazi Germany.

During the 1937 election, his party registered its strongest showing, placing third and winning 15.8% of the vote. It was kept from power by King Carol II, who invited the rival fascists and fourth-place finishers of the National Christian Party to form a short-lived government, succeeded by the National Renaissance Front royal dictatorship. The rivalry between Codreanu and, on the other side, Carol and moderate politicians like Nicolae Iorga ended with Codreanu's incarceration at Jilava Prison and eventual execution at the hands of the Gendarmerie. He was succeeded as leader by Horia Sima. In 1940, under the National Legionary State proclaimed by the Iron Guard, his killing served as the basis for violent retribution.

Corneliu Zelea Codreanu's views influenced the modern far right. Groups claiming him as a forerunner include Noua Dreaptă and other Romanian successors of the Iron Guard, the International Third Position, and various neofascist organizations in Italy and other parts of Europe.

== Biography ==
=== Early life ===
Corneliu Codreanu was born in Huși to Ion Zelea Codreanu and Elizabeth (née Brunner) on 13 September 1899. His father, a teacher and himself a Romanian nationalist, would later become a political figure within his son's movement. A native of Bukovina in Austria-Hungary, Ion had originally been known as Zelinski; his wife was ethnically German. Statements according to which Ion Zelea Codreanu was originally of Ukrainian or Polish origin contrast with the Romanian chauvinism he embraced for the rest of his life. Codreanu the elder associated with antisemitic figures such as University of Iași professor A. C. Cuza. Just prior to Corneliu Zelea Codreanu's 1938 trial, his ethnic origins were the subject of an anti-Legionary propagandistic campaign organized by the authorities, who distributed copies of a variant of his genealogy which alleged that he was of mixed ancestry, being the descendant of not just Ukrainians, Germans, and Romanians, but also Czechs and Russians, and that several of their ancestors were delinquents. Historian Ilarion Țiu describes this as an attempt to offend and libel Codreanu. Codreanu's mother came from a Bukovina German family, which had originally emigrated from Bavaria. Historian Dragoș Zamfirescu claims that only Elizabeth's father was German, while her mother was an ethnic Hungarian.

Too young for conscription in 1916, when Romania entered World War I on the Entente side, Codreanu nonetheless attempted to enlist and fight in the subsequent campaign. His education at the military school in Bacău (where he was a colleague of Petre Pandrea, the future left-wing activist) ended in the same year as Romania's direct entry into the war. In 1919, after moving to Iași, Codreanu found communism as his new enemy, after he had witnessed the effects of Bolshevik activity in Moldavia, and especially after Romania lost her main ally in the October Revolution, forcing her to sign the 1918 Treaty of Bucharest; also, the newly founded Comintern was violently opposed to Romania's interwar borders (see Greater Romania).

While the Bolshevik presence decreased overall following the repression of Socialist Party riots in Bucharest (December 1918), it remained or was perceived as relatively strong in Iași and other Moldavian cities and towns. In this context, the easternmost region of Bessarabia, which united with Romania in 1918, was believed by Codreanu and others to be especially prone to Bolshevik influence. Codreanu learned antisemitism from his father, but connected it with anticommunism, in the belief that Jews were, among other things, the primordial agents of the Soviet Union (see Jewish Bolshevism).

=== GCN and National-Christian Defense League ===
Codreanu studied law in Iași, where he began his political career. Like his father, he became close to A. C. Cuza. Codreanu's fear of Bolshevik insurrection led to his efforts to address industrial workers himself. At the time, Cuza was preaching that the Jewish population was a manifest threat to Romanians, claimed that Jews were threatening the purity of Romanian young women, and began campaigning in favour of racial segregation.

According to Romanian historian Adrian Cioroianu, he defined the early Codreanu as a "quasi-demagogue agitator". According to Cioroianu, Codreanu loved Romania with "fanaticism", which implied that he saw the country as "idyllicized [and] different from the real one of his times". British scholar Christopher Catherwood also referred to Codreanu as "an obsessive anti-Semite and religious fanatic". Historian Zeev Barbu proposed that "Cuza was Codreanu's mentor [...], but nothing that Codreanu learned from him was strikingly new. Cuza served mainly as a catalyst for his nationalism and antisemitism." As he himself later acknowledged, the young activist was also deeply influenced by the physiologist and antisemitic ideologue Nicolae Paulescu, who was involved with Cuza's movement.

In late 1919, Codreanu joined the short-lived Garda Conștiinței Naționale (GCN, "Guard of National Conscience"), a group formed by the electrician Constantin Pancu. Pancu had an enormous influence on Codreanu.

Pancu's movement, whose original membership did not exceed 40, attempted to revive loyalism within the proletariat (while offering an alternative to communism by advocating increased labor rights). Like other reactionary groups, it won the tacit support of General Alexandru Averescu and his increasingly popular People's Party (of which Cuza became an affiliate); Averescu's ascension to power in 1920 engendered a new period of social troubles in the larger urban areas (see Labor movement in Romania).

The GCN, in which Codreanu thought he could see the nucleus of nationalist trade unions, became active in crushing strike actions. Their activities did not fail in attracting attention, especially after students who obeyed Codreanu, grouped in the Association of Christian Students, started demanding a Numerus clausus (Jewish quota) for higher education – this gathered popularity for the GCN, and it led to a drastic increase in the frequency and intensity of assaults on all its opponents. In response, Codreanu was expelled from the University of Iași. Although allowed to return when Cuza and others intervened for him (refusing to respect the decision of the University Senate), he was never presented with a diploma after his graduation.

While studying in Berlin and Jena in 1922, Codreanu took a critical attitude towards the Weimar Republic, and began praising the March on Rome and Italian fascism as major achievements against the advancement of communism; he decided to cut his stay short after learning of the large Romanian student protests in December, prompted by the intention of the government to grant the complete emancipation of Jews (see History of the Jews in Romania).

When protests organized by Codreanu were met with lack of interest from the new National Liberal government, he and Cuza founded (4 March 1923) a Christian nationalist organization called the National-Christian Defense League. They were joined in 1925 by Ion Moța, translator of the antisemitic hoax known as The Protocols of the Elders of Zion and future ideologue of the Legion. Codreanu was subsequently tasked with organizing the League at a national level, and became especially preoccupied with its youth ventures.

With the granting of full rights of citizenship to persons of Jewish descent under the Constitution of 1923, the League raided the Iași ghetto, led a group which petitioned the government in Bucharest (being received with indifference), and ultimately decided to assassinate Premier Ion I. C. Brătianu and other members of government. Codreanu also drafted the first of his several death lists, which contained the names of politicians who, he believed, had betrayed Romania. It included Gheorghe Gh. Mârzescu, who held several offices in Brătianu's executive, and who promoted the emancipation of Jews. In October 1923, Codreanu was betrayed by one of his associates, arrested, and put on trial. He and the other plotters were soon acquitted, as Romanian legislation did not allow for prosecution of conspiracies that had not been assigned a definite date. Before the jury ended deliberation, Ion Moța shot the traitor and was given a prison sentence himself.

=== Manciu's killing ===
Codreanu clashed with Cuza over the League's structure: he demanded that it develop a paramilitary and revolutionary character, while Cuza was hostile to the idea. In November, while in Văcărești Prison in Bucharest, Codreanu had planned for the creation of a youth organization within the League, which he aimed to call The Legion of the Archangel Michael. This was said to be in honour of an Orthodox icon that adorned the walls of the prison church, or, more specifically, linked to Codreanu's reported claim of having been visited by the Archangel himself. A more personal problem also divided Codreanu and Cuza, namely that Cuza's son had an affair with Codreanu's sister that left her pregnant. The couple had broken up when the younger Cuza refused his girlfriend's demand that he marry her now that she was bearing his child. Though the scandal was hushed up, the fact that his sister was having an illegitimate child was deeply humiliating for Codreanu as he liked to present his family as model members of the Orthodox church and he sought unsuccessfully to have Cuza pressure his son to marry his sister.

Back in Iași, Codreanu created his own system of allegiance within the League, starting with the Frăția de Cruce ("Brotherhood of the Cross", named after a variant of blood brotherhood which requires sermon with a cross). It gathered on 6 May 1924, in the countryside around Iași, starting work on the building of a student centre. This meeting was violently broken up by the authorities on orders from Romanian Police prefect Constantin Manciu. Codreanu and several others were allegedly beaten and tormented for several days, until Cuza's intervention on their behalf proved effective.

After an interval of retreating from any political activity, Codreanu took revenge on Manciu, assassinating him and severely wounding some other policemen on 24 October 1924, in the Iași Tribunal building (where Manciu had been called to answer accusations, after one of Codreanu's comrades had filed a complaint). Forensics showed that Manciu was not facing his killer at the moment of his death, which prompted Codreanu to indicate that he was acting in self-defence based solely on Manciu's earlier actions. Codreanu gave himself up immediately after firing his gun, and awaited trial in custody. The police force of Iași was unpopular with the public due to widespread corruption, and many locals saw the murder of Manciu as a heroic act by Codreanu. In the meantime, the issue was brought up in the Parliament of Romania by the Peasant Party's Paul Bujor, who first made a proposal to review legislation dealing with political violence and sedition; it won the approval of the governing National Liberal Party, which, on 19 December, passed the Mârzescu Law (named after its proponent, Mârzescu, who had been appointed Minister of Justice). Its most notable, if indirect, effect was the banning of the Communist Party. In October and November, debates between members of Parliament became heated, and Cuza's group was singled out as morally responsible for the murder: Petre Andrei stated that "Mr. Cuza aimed and Codreanu fired", to which Cuza replied by claiming his innocence, while theorizing that Manciu's brutality was a justifiable cause for violent retaliation.

Although Codreanu was purposely tried far away from Iași at Turnu Severin, the authorities were unable to find a neutral jury. On the day he was acquitted, members of the jury, who deliberated for five minutes in all, showed up wearing badges with League symbols and swastikas (the symbol in use by Cuza's League). After a triumphal return and an ostentatious wedding to Elena Ilinoiu, Codreanu clashed with Cuza for a second time and decided to defuse tensions by taking leave in France.

Codreanu's wedding to Elena Ilinoiu in June 1925 in Focșani was the major social event in Romania that year; it was celebrated in lavish, pseudo-royal style and attended by thousands, attracting enormous media attention. After the wedding, Codreanu and his bride were followed by 3,000 ox-carts in a four-mile long procession of "ecstatically happy" peasants. One of Codreanu's followers wrote at the time that Romanians loved royal spectacles, especially royal weddings, but since Crown Prince Carol had eloped first to marry a commoner in 1918 in a private wedding followed by a royal wedding in Greece, Codreanu's wedding was the best substitute for the royal wedding that the Romanian people wanted to see. Codreanu's wedding was meant to change his image from the romantic, restless, Byronic hero image he had held until then to a more "settled" image of a married man, and thus allay concerns held by more conservative Romanians about his social radicalism.

=== Creation of the Legion of the Archangel Michael ===
Codreanu returned from Grenoble to take part in the 1926 elections, and ran as a candidate for the town of Focșani. He lost, and, although it had had a considerable success, the League disbanded in the same year. Codreanu gathered former members of the League who had spent time in prison, and put into practice his dream of forming the Legion (November 1927, just days after the fall of a new Averescu cabinet, which had continued to support now-rival Cuza). Codreanu claimed to have had a vision of the Archangel Michael who told him he had been chosen by God to be Romania's saviour. From the beginning, the Legion claimed that a commitment to the values of the Eastern Orthodox Church was central to its message, and Codreanu's alleged vision was a centrepiece of his message.

Based on the Frăția de Cruce, Codreanu designed the Legion as a selective and autarkic group, paying allegiance to him exclusively, and soon expanded it into a replicating network of political cells called "nests" (cuiburi). Frăția endured as the Legion's most secretive and highest body, which requested from its members that they undergo a rite of passage and swear allegiance to the "Captain", as Codreanu was now known.

According to American historian Barbara Jelavich, the movement "at first supported no set ideology, but instead emphasized the moral regeneration of the individual", while expressing a commitment to the Romanian Orthodox Church. The Legion introduced Orthodox rituals as part of its political rallies, while Codreanu made his public appearances dressed in folk costume — a traditionalist pose adopted at the time only by him and the National Peasant Party's Ion Mihalache. Throughout its existence, the Legion maintained strong links with members of the Romanian Orthodox clergy, and its members fused politics with an original interpretation of Romanian Orthodox messages — including claims that the Romanian kin was expecting its national salvation, in a religious sense.

Such a mystical focus, Jelavich noted, was in tandem with a marked preoccupation for violence and self-sacrifice, "but only if the [acts of terror] were committed for the good of the cause and subsequently expiated." Legionnaires engaged in violent or murderous acts often turned themselves in to be arrested, and it became common that violence was seen as a necessary step in a world that expected a Second Coming of Christ. With time, the Legion developed a doctrine around a cult of the fallen, going so far as to imply that the dead continued to form an integral part of a perpetual national community. As a consequence of its mysticism, the movement made a point of not adopting or advertising any particular platform, and Codreanu explained early on: "The country is dying for lack of men and not for lack of political programs." Elsewhere, he pointed out that the Legion was interested in the creation of a "new man" (omul nou).

Despite its apparent lack of political messages, the movement was immediately noted for its antisemitism, for arguing that Romania was faced with a "Jewish Question" and for proclaiming that a Jewish presence thrived on uncouthness and pornography. The Legionary leader wrote: "The historical mission of our generation is the resolution of the 'kike' problem. All of our battles of the past 15 years have had this purpose, all of our life's efforts from now on will have this purpose." He accused the Jews in general of attempting to destroy what he claimed was a direct link between Romania and God, and the Legion campaigned in favour of the notion that there was no actual connection between the Old Testament Hebrews and the modern Jews. In one instance, making a reference to the origin of the Romanians, Codreanu stated that Jews were corrupting the "Roman-Dacian structure of our people." The Israeli historian Jean Ancel wrote that, from the mid-19th century onward, the Romanian intelligentsia had a "schizophrenic attitude towards the West and its values". Romania had been a strongly Francophile country starting in the 19th century, and most of the Romanian intelligentsia professed themselves believers in French ideas about the universal appeal of democracy, freedom, and human rights while at the same time holding antisemitic views about Romania's Jewish minority. Ancel wrote that Codreanu was the first significant Romanian to reject not only the prevailing Francophilia of the intelligentsia, but also the entire framework of universal democratic values, which Codreanu claimed were "Jewish inventions" designed to destroy Romania.

He began openly calling for the destruction of Jews, and, as early as 1927, the new movement organized the sacking and burning of a synagogue in the city of Oradea. It thus profited from an exceptional popularity of antisemitism in Romanian society: according to one analysis, Romania was, with the exception of Poland, the most antisemitic country in Eastern Europe.

Codreanu's message was among the most radical forms of Romanian antisemitism, and contrasted with the generally more moderate antisemitic views of Cuza's former associate, the prominent historian Nicolae Iorga. The model favoured by the Legion was a form of racial antisemitism, and formed part of Codreanu's theory that the Romanians were biologically distinct and superior to neighbouring or co-inhabiting ethnicities (including the Hungarian community). Codreanu also voiced his thoughts on the issue of Romanian expansionism, which show that he was pondering the incorporation of Soviet lands over the Dniester (in the region later annexed under the name of Transnistria) and planning a Romanian-led transnational federation centred on the Carpathians and the Danube.

In 1936, Codreanu published an essay entitled "The Resurrection of the Race", where he wrote

I will under underline this once again: we are not up against a few pathetic individuals who have landed here by chance and who now seek protection and shelter. We are up against a fully-fledged Jewish state, an entire army which has come here with its sights set on conquest. The movement of the Jewish population and its penetration into Romania are being carried out in accordance with precise plans. In all probability, the 'Great Jewish Council' is planning the creation of a new Palestine on a strip of land, starting out on the Baltic Sea, embracing a part of Poland and Czechoslovakia and half of Romania right across to the Black Sea...

The worse thing that Jews and politicians have done to us, the greatest danger that they have exposed our people to, is not the way they are seizing the riches and possessions of our country, destroying the Romanian middle class, the way they swamp our schools and liberal professions, or the pernicious influence they are having on our whole political life, although these already constitute mortal dangers for a people. The greatest danger they pose to the people is rather that they are undermining us racially, that they are destroying the racial, Romano-Dacian structure of our people and call into being a type of human being that is nothing, but a racial wreck."

From early on, the movement registered significant gains among the middle-class and educated youth. However, according to various commentators, Codreanu won his most significant following in the rural environment, which in part reflected the fact that he and most other Legionary leaders were first-generation urban dwellers. American historian of fascism Stanley G. Payne, who noted that the Legion benefited from the 400% increase in university enrolment ("proportionately more than anywhere else in Europe"), has described the Captain and his network of disciples as "a revolutionary alliance of students and poor peasants", which centred on the "new underemployed intelligentsia prone to radical nationalism". Thus, a characteristic trait of the newly-founded movement was the young age of its leaders; later records show that the average age of the Legionary elite was 27.4.

By then also an anticapitalist, Codreanu identified in Jewry the common source of economic liberalism and communism, both seen as internationalist forces manipulated by a Judaic conspiracy. As an opponent of modernization and materialism, he only vaguely indicated that his movement's economic goals implied a non-Marxian form of Collectivist anarchism, and presided over his followers' initiatives to set up various cooperatives.

=== First outlawing and parliamentary mandate ===
After more than two years of stagnation, Codreanu felt it necessary to amend the purpose of the movement: he and the leadership of the movement started touring rural regions, addressing the churchgoing illiterate population with the rhetoric of sermons, dressing up in long white mantles and instigating Christian prejudice against Judaism (this intense campaign was also prompted by the fact that the Legion was immediately sidelined by Cuza's League in the traditionally-receptive Moldavian and Bukovinian centers). Between 1928 and 1930, the Alexandru Vaida-Voevod National Peasants' Party cabinet gave tacit assistance to the Guard, but Iuliu Maniu (representing the same party) clamped down on the Legion after July 1930. This came after the latter had tried to provoke a wave of pogroms in Maramureș and Bessarabia. In one notable incident of 1930, Legionnaires encouraged the peasant population of Borșa to attack the town's 4,000 Jews.

The Legion also attempted to assassinate government officials and journalists, including Constantin Angelescu, undersecretary of Internal Affairs. Codreanu was briefly arrested together with the would-be assassin Gheorghe Beza: both were tried and acquitted. Nevertheless, the wave of violence and a planned march into Bessarabia signalled the outlawing of the party by Premier Gheorghe Mironescu and Minister of the Interior Ion Mihalache (January 1931); again arrested, Codreanu was acquitted in late February.

Having been boosted by the Great Depression in Romania and the discontent it engendered, in 1931, the Legion also profited from the disagreement between King Carol II and the National Peasants' Party, which brought a cabinet formed around Nicolae Iorga. Codreanu was consequently elected to the Chamber of Deputies on the lists of the "Corneliu Zelea Codreanu Grouping" (the provisional name for the Guard), together with other prominent members of his original movement — including Ion Zelea, his father, and Mihai Stelescu, a young activist who ultimately came into conflict with the Legion; it is likely that the new Vaida-Voevod cabinet gave tacit support to the Grouping in subsequent partial elections. The Legion had won five seats in all, signalling its first important electoral gain.

Codreanu quickly became noted for exposing the corruption of ministers and other politicians on a case-by-case basis (although several of his political adversaries at the time described him as "bland and incompetent").

=== Clash with Duca and truce with Tătărescu ===
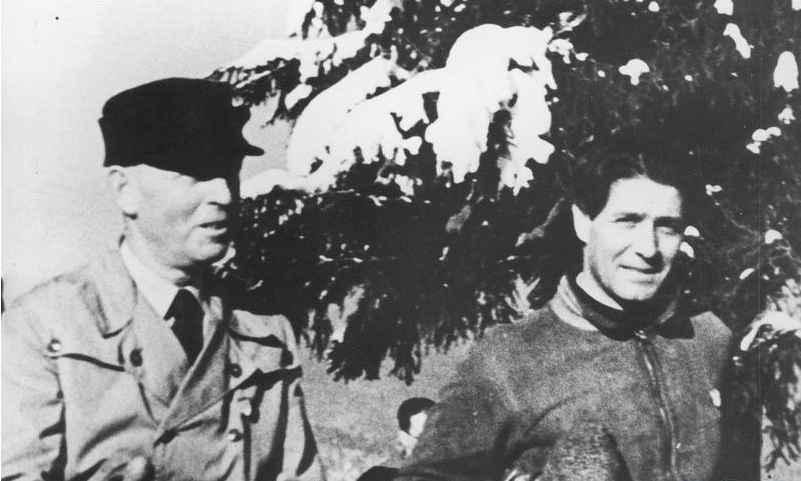
Ion Antonescu and Codreanu at a skiing event in 1935

The authorities became increasingly concerned with the revolutionary potential of the Legion, and minor clashes in 1932 between the two introduced what became, from 1933, almost a decade of major political violence. The situation degenerated after Codreanu expressed his full support for Adolf Hitler and Nazism (even to the detriment of Italian fascism, and probably an added source for the conflict between the Captain and Stelescu). Romania was traditionally one of the most Francophile countries in Europe and had been allied to its "Latin sister" France since 1926, so Codreanu's call for an alliance with Germany was very novel for the time. A new National Liberal cabinet, formed by Ion G. Duca, moved against such initiatives, stating that the Legion was acting as a puppet of the German Nazi Party, and ordering that a huge number of Legionnaires be arrested just prior to the new elections in 1933 (which the Liberals won). Several of the Legionnaires held in custody were killed by authorities. In retaliation, Duca was assassinated by the Iron Guard's Nicadori death squad on 30 December 1933. Another result was the very first crackdown on non-affiliated sympathizers of the Iron Guard, after Nae Ionescu and allies protested against its repression.

Due to Duca's killing, Codreanu was forced into hiding, awaiting calm and delegating leadership to General Gheorghe Cantacuzino-Grănicerul, who later assumed partial guilt for the assassination. Legionnaire Mihai Stelescu, who would become Codreanu's adversary as head of the splinter group Crusade of Romanianism, alleged that Codreanu had been given refuge by a cousin of Magda Lupescu, Carol's mistress, implying that the Guard was becoming corrupt. Despite Codreanu's attacks on the elite, at his trial in 1934 a number of respected politicians like Gheorghe I. Brătianu, Alexandru Vaida-Voevod and Constantin Argetoianu testified for Codreanu as character witnesses. Codreanu was again acquitted.

As Prime Minister I.G. Duca had alleged, the Iron Guard did have some links to the Nazi Party's foreign office under Alfred Rosenberg, but in 1933–34 the main local beneficiary of financial support from Rosenberg was Codreanu's rival Octavian Goga, who lacked Codreanu's mass following and thus was more biddable. A further issue for the Nazis was concern over Codreanu's statements that Romania had too many minorities for its own good, which led to fears that Codreanu might persecute the volksdeutsch minority if he came to power. Though limited, the connections between the NSDAP and the Iron Guard added to the Legion's appeal as the Iron Guard was associated in the public mind with the apparently dynamic and successful society of Nazi Germany.

Some time after the start of Gheorghe Tătărescu's premiership and Ion Inculeț's leadership of the Internal Affairs Ministry, repression of the Legion ceased, a measure which reflected Carol's hope to ensure a new period of stability. In 1936, during a youth congress in Târgu Mureș, Codreanu agreed to the formation of a permanent Death Squad, which immediately showed its goals with the killing of dissident Mihai Stelescu by a group called the Decemviri (led by Ion Caratănase), neutralizing the Crusade of Romanianism's anti-Legion campaign, and silencing Stelescu's claims that Codreanu was politically corrupt, uncultured, a plagiarist, and hypocritical in his public display of asceticism.

1937 was marked by the deaths and ostentatious funerals of Ion Moța (by then, the movement's vice president) and Vasile Marin, who had volunteered on Francisco Franco's side in the Spanish Civil War and had been killed in the battle at Majadahonda. Codreanu also published his autobiographical and ideological essay Pentru legionari ("For the Legionnaires" or "For My Legionnaires").

It was during this period that the Guard came to be financed by Nicolae Malaxa (otherwise known as a prominent collaborator of Carol), and became interested in reforming itself to reach an even wider audience: Codreanu created a meritocratic inner structure of ranks, established a wide range of philanthropic ventures, again voiced themes which appealed to the industrial workers, and created Corpul Muncitoresc Legionar, a Legion branch which grouped members of the working class. King Carol struggled to preserve his rule after being faced with a decline in the appeal of the more traditional parties, and, as Tătărescu's term approached its end, Carol made an offer to Codreanu, demanding leadership of the Legion in exchange for a Legionary cabinet; this offer was promptly refused.

=== "Everything for the Country" Party ===
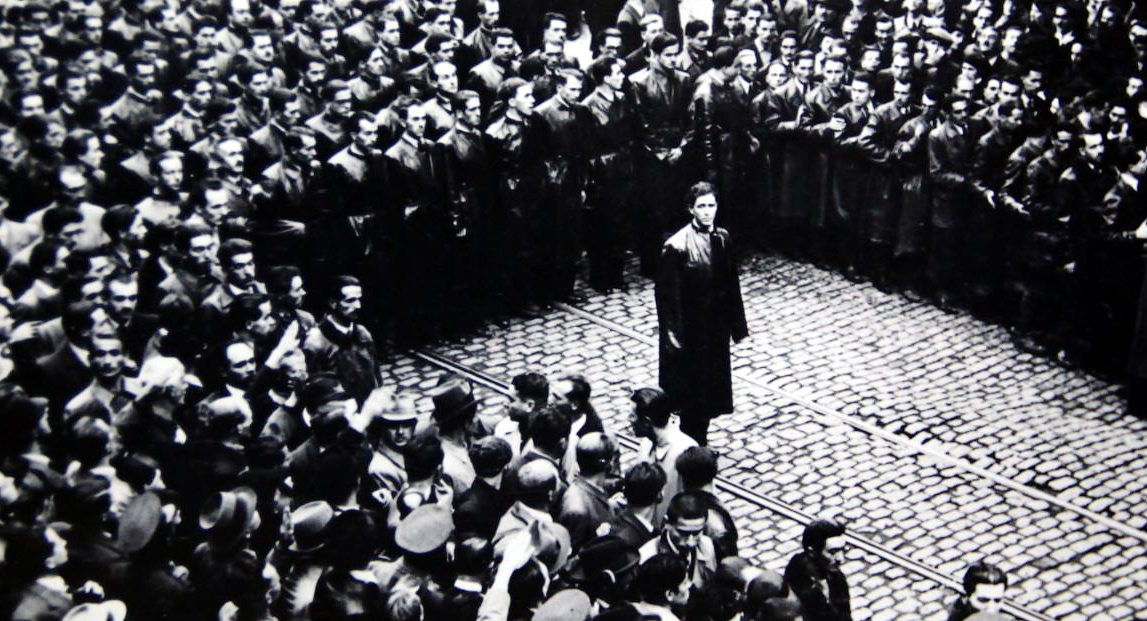
Corneliu Zelea Codreanu and Iron Guard members in 1937

After the consequent ban on paramilitary groups, the Legion was restyled into a political party, running in elections as Totul Pentru Țară ("Everything for the Country", acronym TPȚ). Shortly afterwards, Codreanu went on record stating his contempt for Romania's alliances in Eastern Europe, in particular the Little Entente and the Balkan Pact, and indicating that, 48 hours after his movement came into power, the country would be aligned with Nazi Germany and Fascist Italy. Reportedly, such trust and confidence were reciprocated by both German officials and Italian Foreign Minister Galeazzo Ciano, the latter of whom viewed Goga's cabinet as a transition to the Iron Guard's rule.

In the elections of 1937, when it signed an electoral pact with the National Peasants' Party with the goal of preventing the government from making use of electoral fraud, TPȚ received 15.8% of the vote (occasionally rounded up to 16%). Despite failure to win the majority bonus, Codreanu's movement was, at the time, the third most popular party in Romania, the only one whose popularity grew in 1937–1938, and by far the most popular fascist group.

The Legion was excluded from political coalitions by nominally fascist King Carol, who preferred newly-formed subservient movements and the revived National-Christian Defense League. Cuza created his antisemitic government together with poet Octavian Goga and his National Agrarian Party. Codreanu and the two leaders did not get along, and the Legion started competing with the authorities by adopting corporatism. In parallel, he urged his followers to set up private businesses, claiming to follow the advice of Nicolae Iorga, after the latter claimed that a Romanian-run commerce could prove a solution to what he deemed the "Jewish Question".

The new government alliance, unified as the National Christian Party, gave itself a blue-shirted paramilitary corps that borrowed heavily from the Legion — the Lăncieri — and initiated an official campaign of persecution of Jews, attempting to win back the interest public interest in the Iron Guard. After much violence, Codreanu was approached by Goga and agreed to have his party withdraw from campaigning in the scheduled elections of 1938, believing that, in any event, the regime had no viable solution and would wear itself out — while attempting to profit from the king's authoritarianism by showing his willingness to integrate any possible one-party system.

=== Clash with King Carol and 1938 trials ===
Codreanu's designs were overturned by Carol, who deposed Goga, introducing his own dictatorship after his attempts to form a national government. The system relied instead on the new Constitution of 1938, the financial backing received from large business, and the winning over of several more or less traditional politicians, such as Nicolae Iorga and the Internal Affairs Minister Armand Călinescu (see National Renaissance Front). The ban on the Guard was again tightly enforced, with Călinescu ordering all public places known to have harboured Legion meetings to be closed down (including several restaurants in Bucharest). Members of the movement were placed under close surveillance or arrested in cases where they did not abide by the new legislation, while civil servants risked arrest if they were caught spreading Iron Guard propaganda.

The official and semi-official press began attacking Codreanu. He was thus virulently criticized by the magazine Neamul Românesc, which was edited by Iorga. When Carol felt he had sufficient control of the situation, he ordered a brutal suppression of the Iron Guard and had Codreanu arrested on the charge of slander, based on a letter Codreanu sent to Iorga on 26 March 1938, in which he had attacked him for collaborating with Carol, calling Iorga "morally dishonest". Codreanu referred to the historian's charge that Legionary commerce was financing rebellion, and argued that this strategy had originated from Iorga's own arguments. Nicolae Iorga replied by filing a complaint with the Military Tribunal and by writing Codreanu a letter which advised him to "descend in [his] conscience to find remorse" for "the amount of blood spilled over him".

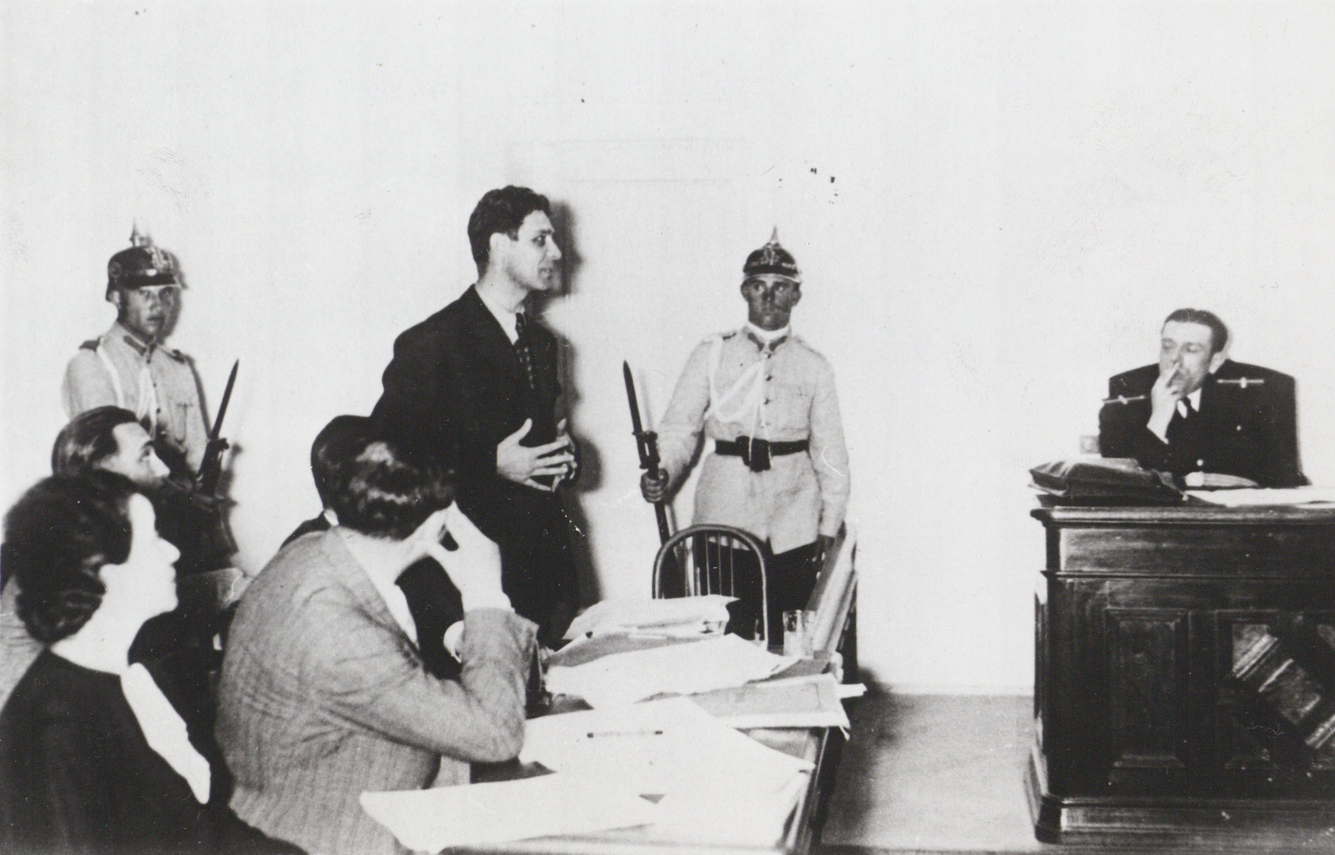
1938 trial of Codreanu for high treason

Upon being informed of the indictment, Codreanu urged his followers not to take any action if he was going to be sentenced to less than six months in prison, stressing that he wanted to give an example of dignity; however, he also ordered a group of Legionnaires to defend him in case of an attack by the authorities. In April 1938, he was arrested together with 44 other prominent members of the movement, including Ion Zelea Codreanu, Gheorghe Clime, Alexandru Cristian Tell, Radu Gyr, Nae Ionescu, Șerban Milcoveanu and Mihail Polihroniade, on the evening of 16 April. The crackdown coincided with the Orthodox celebration of Palm Sunday (when those targeted were known to be in their homes). After a short stay in the Romanian Police Prefecture, Codreanu was dispatched to Jilava Prison, while the other prisoners were sent to Tismana Monastery (and later to concentration camps such as the one in Miercurea Ciuc).

Codreanu was tried for slander and sentenced to six months in jail, before the authorities indicted him for treason, sedition, and for the crimes of politically organizing underage students, issuing orders inciting to violence, maintaining links with foreign organizations, and organizing fire practices. Witnesses testifying in his defense included General Ion Antonescu, who would later become Conducător and Premier of Romania.

The two trials were marked by irregularities, and Codreanu accused the judges and prosecutors of conducting them in a "Bolshevik" manner, because he had not been allowed to speak in his own defence. He sought the counsel of the prominent lawyers Istrate Micescu and Grigore Iunian, but was refused by both, and, as a consequence, his defence team comprised Legionary activists with little experience. They were several times prevented by the authorities from preparing their pleas. The conditions of his imprisonment were initially harsh: his cell was damp and cold, which caused him health problems.

==== Prison sentence ====
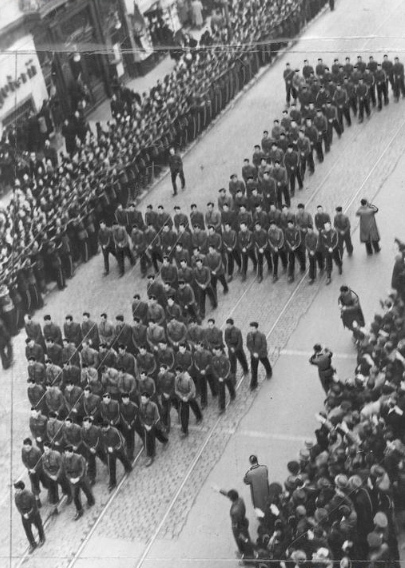
Codreanu's funeral, November 1940

Codreanu was eventually sentenced to ten years of hard labour in the salt mines. According to historian Ilarion Țiu, the trial and verdict were received with general apathy, and the only political faction believed to have organized a public rally in connection with it was the outlawed Romanian Communist Party, some of whose members gathered in front of the tribunal to express support for the conviction. The Legionary Movement itself grew disorganized, and provincial bodies of the Legion came to exercise control over the centre, which had been weakened by the arrests. As the political establishment's main branches welcomed the news of Codreanu's sentencing, the Iron Guard organized a retaliation attack targeting the National Peasant Party's Virgil Madgearu, who had become known for expressing his opposition to the movement's extremism (Madgearu managed to escape the violence unharmed).

Codreanu was moved from Jilava to Doftana Prison, where, despite the sentence, he was not required to perform any form of physical work. The conditions of his detention improved, and he was allowed to regularly communicate with his family and subordinates. At the time, he rejected all possibility of an escape, and ordered the Legion to refrain from violent acts. A provisional leadership team was also organized, consisting of Ion Antoniu, Ion Belgae, Radu Mironovici, Iordache Nicoară, and Horia Sima. However, the provisional leadership, against Codreanu's wishes, announced that he was faring badly in prison and threatened further retaliation, to the point where the prison staff increased security as a means to prevent a potential break-in.

In the autumn, following the successful Nazi German expansion into Central Europe which seemed to provide momentum for the Guard, and even more so the international context provided by the Munich Agreement and the First Vienna Award, its clandestine leadership grew confident and published manifestos threatening King Carol. Those members of the Iron Guard who escaped persecution or were omitted in the first place started a violent campaign throughout Romania, meant to coincide with Carol's visit to Hitler at the Berghof, as a way to prevent the tentative approach between Romania and Nazi Germany. Confident that Hitler was not determined on supporting the Legion, and irritated by the incidents, Carol ordered the decapitation of the movement.

=== Death ===
On 30 November, it was announced that Codreanu, the Nicadori and the Decemviri had been shot after trying to flee custody the previous night. The actual details were revealed much later: the fourteen persons had been transported from their prison and executed (strangled or garroted and shot) by the Gendarmerie around Tâncăbești (near Bucharest), and their bodies had been buried in the courtyard of the Jilava Prison. Their bodies were dissolved in acid, and placed under seven tons of concrete.

== Legacy ==
=== Lifetime influence and Legionary power ===
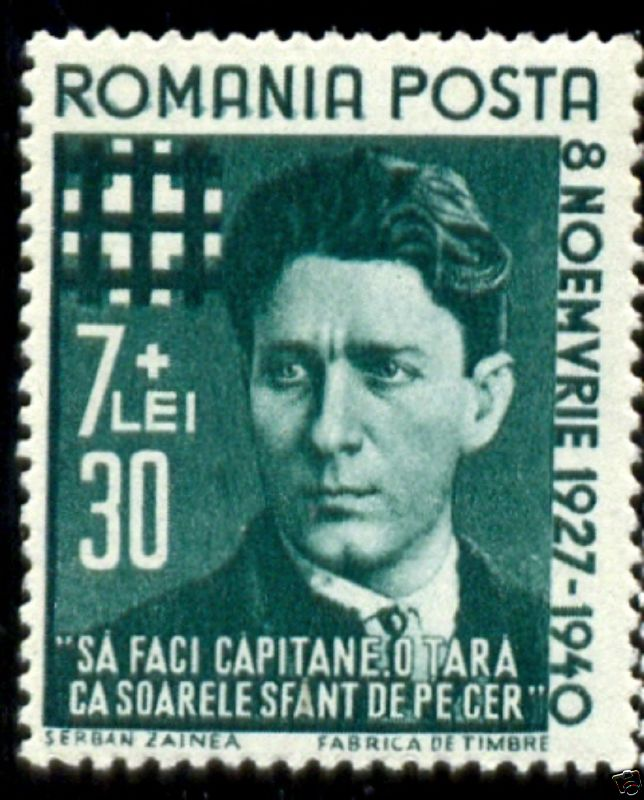
1940 stamp issued by the National Legionary State and showing Codreanu. The caption reads: "Captain, may you give the country the likeness of the Holy Sun [that shines] up in the sky"

According to Adrian Cioroianu, Codreanu was "the most successful political and at the same time anti-political model of interwar Romania". The Legion was described by British researcher Norman Davies as "one of Europe's more violent fascist movements." Stanley G. Payne argued that the Iron Guard was "probably the most unusual mass movement of interwar Europe", and noted that part of this was owed to Codreanu being "a sort of religious mystic"; British historian James Mayall saw the Legion as "the most singular of the lesser fascist movements".

The charismatic leadership represented by Codreanu has drawn comparisons with models favoured by other leaders of far-right and fascist movements, including Hitler and Benito Mussolini. Payne and German historian Ernst Nolte proposed that, among European far-rightists, Codreanu was most like Hitler regarding fanaticism. In Payne's view, however, he was virtually unparalleled in demanding "self-destructiveness" from his followers. Mayall, who states the Legion "was inspired in large measure by National Socialism and fascism", argues that Corneliu Zelea Codreanu's vision of "omul nou", although akin to the "new man" of Nazi and Italian doctrines, is characterized by an unparalleled focus on mysticism. Historian Renzo De Felice, who dismisses the notion that Nazism and fascism are connected, also argues that, due the Legionary attack on "bourgeois values and institutions", which the fascist ideology wanted instead to "purify and perfect", Codreanu "was not, strictly speaking, a fascist." Spanish historian Francisco Veiga argued that "fascization" was a process experienced by the Guard, accumulating traits over a more generic nationalist fibre.

According to American journalist R. G. Waldeck, who was present in Romania in 1940–1941, the violent killing of Codreanu only served to cement his popularity and arouse interest in his cause. She wrote: "To the Rumanian people the Capitano [sic, Căpitanul] remained a saint and a martyr and the apostle of a better Rumania. Even skeptical ones who did not agree with him in political matters still grew dreamy-eyed remembering Codreanu." Historiographer Lucian Boia notes that Codreanu, his rival Carol II, and military leader Ion Antonescu were each in turn perceived as "savior" figures by the Romanian public, and that, unlike other such examples of popular men, they all preached authoritarianism. Cioroianu also writes that Codreanu's death "whether or not paradoxically, would increase the personage's charisma and would turn him straight into a legend." Attitudes similar to those described by Waldeck were relatively widespread among Romanian youths, many of whom came to join the Iron Guard out of admiration for the deceased Codreanu while still in middle or high school.

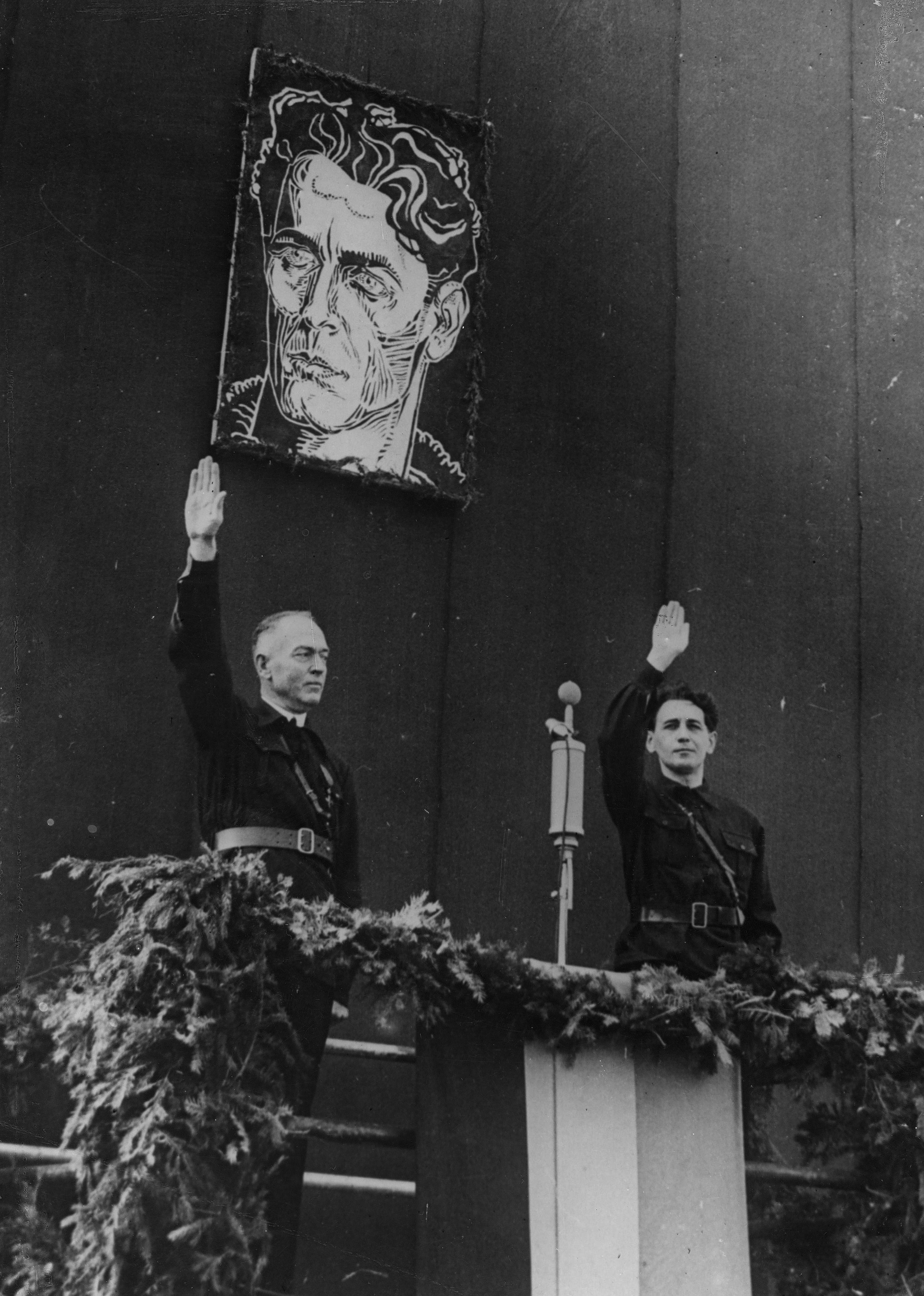
Conducător of Romania Marshal Ion Antonescu and Iron Guard leader Horia Sima salute underneath a portrait of Iron Guard founder Codreanu, October 1940

Under the leadership of Horia Sima, the Iron Guard eventually came to power for a five-month period in 1940–1941, proclaiming the fascist National Legionary State and forming an uneasy partnership with Conducător Ion Antonescu. This was a result of Carol's downfall, effected by the Second Vienna Award, through which Romania had lost Northern Transylvania to Hungary. On 25 November 1940, an investigation was carried out on the Jilava Prison premises. The discovery of Codreanu and his associates' remains caused the Legionnaires to engage in a reprisal against the new regime's political prisoners, who were then detained in the same prison. On the next night, sixty-four inmates were shot, while on 27 and 28 November there were fresh arrests and swift executions, with prominent victims such as Iorga and Virgil Madgearu (see: Jilava Massacre). The resulting widespread disorder brought the first open clash between Antonescu and the Legion. During the events, Codreanu was posthumously exonerated of all charges by a Legionary tribunal. His exhumation was a grandiose ceremony, marked by the participation of Romania's new ally, Nazi Germany: Luftwaffe planes dropped wreaths on Codreanu's open tomb.

Codreanu's wife Elena withdrew from the public eye after her husband's killing, but, after the communist regime took hold, was arrested and deported to the Bărăgan, where she grew close to women aviators of the White Squadron. She also met and married Barbu Praporgescu (son of General David Praporgescu), moving in with him in Bucharest after their liberation. Widowed for a second time, she spent her final years with her relatives in Moldavia.

=== Codreanu and modern-day political discourse ===
The movement was eventually toppled from power by Antonescu as a consequence of the Legionnaires' Rebellion. The events associated with Sima's term in office resulted in conflicts and infighting within the Legion and its contemporary successors: many "Codrenist" Legionnaires claim to obey Codreanu and his father Ion Zelea, but not Sima, while, at the same time, the "Simist" faction claims to have followed Codreanu's guidance and inspiration in carrying out violent acts.

Codreanu had an enduring influence in Italy. His views and style were attested to have influenced the controversial Traditionalist philosopher and racial theorist Julius Evola. Evola himself met with Codreanu on one occasion, and, in the words of his friend, the writer and historian Mircea Eliade, was "dazzled". Reportedly, the visit had been arranged by Eliade and philosopher Vasile Lovinescu, both of whom sympathized with the Iron Guard. Their guest later wrote that the Iron Guard founder was: "one of the worthiest and spiritually best oriented figures that I ever met in the nationalist movements of the time." According to De Felice, Codreanu has also become a main reference point for the Italian neofascist groups, alongside Evola and the ideologues of Nazism. He argues that this phenomenon, which tends to shadow references to Italian Fascism itself, is owed to Mussolini's failures in setting up "a true fascist state", and to the subsequent need of finding other role models. Evola's disciple and prominent neofascist activist Franco Freda published several of Codreanu's essays at his Edizioni di Ar, while their follower Claudio Mutti was noted for his pro-Legionary rhetoric.

In parallel, Codreanu is seen as a hero by representatives of the maverick Neo-Nazi movement known as Strasserism, and in particular by the British-based Strasserist International Third Position (ITP), which uses one of Codreanu's statements as its motto. Codreanu's activities and mystical interpretation of politics were probably an inspiration on Russian politician Alexander Barkashov, founder of the far right Russian National Unity.

After the Romanian Revolution toppled the communist regime, various extremist groups began claiming to represent Codreanu's legacy. Reportedly, one of the first was the short-lived Mișcarea pentru România ("Movement for Romania"), founded by the student leader Marian Munteanu. It was soon followed by the Romanian branch of the ITP and its Timișoara-based mouthpiece, the journal Gazeta de Vest, as well as by other groups claiming to represent the Legionary legacy. Among the latter is Noua Dreaptă, which depicts Codreanu as a spiritual figure, often with attributes equivalent to those of a Romanian Orthodox saint. Each year around 30 November, these diverse groups reunite in Tâncăbești, where they organize festivities to commemorate Codreanu's death.

In the early 2000s, Gigi Becali, a Romanian businessman, owner of the Steaua București football club, and leader of the right-wing New Generation Party, stated that he admired Codreanu and made attempts to capitalize on Legionary symbols and rhetoric, such as adopting a slogan originally coined by the Iron Guard: "I vow to God that I shall make Romania in the likeness of the holy sun in the sky". The statement, used by Becali during the 2004 presidential campaign, owed its inspiration to Legionary songs and was found in a much-publicized homage sent by Ion Moța to his Captain in 1937; it is also said to have been used by Codreanu himself. As a result of it, Becali was argued to have broken the 2002 government ordinance banning the use of fascist discourse. However, the Central Electoral Bureau rejected complaints against Becali, ruling that the slogan was not "identical" to the Legionary one. During the same period, Becali, speaking live in front of Oglinda Television cameras, called for Codreanu to be canonized. The station was fined 50 million lei by the National Audiovisual Council (around $1,223 USD in 2004).

In a poll of the Romanian public conducted by Romanian Television in 2006, Codreanu was voted 22nd among the 100 Greatest Romanians, coming in between Steaua footballer Mirel Rădoi at 21 and the interwar democratic politician Nicolae Titulescu at 23.

In modern Romanian politics, Codreanu's legacy has drawn praise from members of the nationalist Alliance for the Union of Romanians party.

=== Cultural references ===
Late in the 1930s, Codreanu's supporters began publishing books praising his virtues, among which are Vasile Marin's Crez de Generație ("Generation Credo") and Nicolae Roșu's Orientări în Veac ("Orientations in the Century"), both published in 1937. After the National Legionary State officially hailed Corneliu Zelea Codreanu as a martyr to the cause, his image came to be used as a propaganda tool in cultural contexts. Codreanu was integrated into the Legionary cult of death: usually at Iron Guard rallies, Codreanu and other fallen members were mentioned and greeted with the shout Prezent! ("Present!"). His personality cult was reflected in Legionary art, and a stylized image of him was displayed at major rallies, including the notorious and large-scale Bucharest ceremony of 6 October 1940. Although Codreanu was officially condemned by the communist regime a generation later, it is possible that, in its final stage under Nicolae Ceaușescu, it came to use the Captain's personality cult as a source of inspiration. The post-communist Noua Dreaptă, which publicizes portraits of Codreanu in the form of Orthodox icons, often makes use of such representation in its public rallies, usually associating it with its own symbol, the Celtic cross.

In November 1940, the Legionary journalist Ovid Țopa, publishing in the Guard's newspaper Buna Vestire, claimed that Codreanu stood alongside the mythical Dacian prophet and "precursor of Christ" Zalmoxis, the 15th-century Moldavian Prince Stephen the Great, and Romania's national poet Mihai Eminescu, as an essential figure of Romanian history and Romanian spirituality. Other Legionary texts of the time drew a similar parallel between Codreanu, Eminescu, and the 18th-century Transylvanian Romanian peasant leader Horea. Thus, in 1937, sociologist Ernest Bernea had authored Cartea căpitanilor ("The Book of Captains"), where the preferred comparison was between Codreanu, Horea, and Horea's 19th-century counterparts Tudor Vladimirescu and Avram Iancu. Also in November 1940, Codreanu was the subject of a conference given by the young philosopher Emil Cioran and aired by the state-owned Romanian Radio, in which Cioran notably praised the Guard's leader for "having given Romania a purpose". Other tribute pieces in various media came from other radical intellectuals of the period: Eliade, brothers Arșavir and Haig Acterian, Traian Brăileanu, Nichifor Crainic, N. Crevedia, Radu Gyr, Traian Herseni, Nae Ionescu, Constantin Noica, Petre P. Panaitescu, and Marietta Sadova.

The Legionary leader was portrayed in a poem by his follower Radu Gyr, who notably spoke of Codreanu's death as a prelude to his resurrection. In contrast, Codreanu's schoolmate Petre Pandrea, who spent part of his life as a Romanian Communist Party affiliate, left an unflattering memoir of their encounters, used as a preferential source in texts on Codreanu published during the communist period. Despite his earlier confrontation with the Iron Guard, the leftist poet Tudor Arghezi is thought by some to have deplored Codreanu's killing, and to have alluded to it in his poem version of the Făt-Frumos stories. Mircea Eliade, whose early Legionary sympathies became a notorious topic of outrage, was indicated by his disciple Ioan Petru Culianu to have based Eugen Cucoanes, the main character in his novella Un om mare ("A Big Man"), on Codreanu. This hypothesis was commented upon by literary critics Matei Călinescu and Mircea Iorgulescu, the latter of whom argued that there was too-little evidence to support it. The neofascist Claudio Mutti claimed that Codreanu inspired the character Ieronim Thanase in Eliade's Nouăsprăzece trandafiri ("Nineteen Roses") story, a view rejected by Călinescu.
