= Sergeyevka =

Sergeyevka or Sergeevka may refer to:

== Kazakhstan ==
- Sergeyev (Kazakhstan), officially Sergeyevka at the time of the USSR
  - Sergeyev Dam

== Russian Federation ==
- Sergeyevka, Altai Krai
- Sergeyevka, Amur Oblast
- Sergeyevka, Belgorod Oblast
- Sergeyevka, Fatezhsky District, Kursk Oblast
- Sergeyevka, Lgovsky District, Kursk Oblast
- Sergeyevka, Partizansky District, within the coal-bearing basin of Primorsky Krai of the Far Eastern Federal District

=== Bashkortostan ===
- Sergeyevka, Blagoveshchensky District, Republic of Bashkortostan
- Sergeyevka, Buzdyaksky District, Republic of Bashkortostan
- Sergeyevka, Dyurtyulinsky District, Republic of Bashkortostan
- Sergeyevka, Fyodorovsky District, Republic of Bashkortostan
- Sergeyevka, Meleuzovsky District, Republic of Bashkortostan
- Sergeyevka, Miyakinsky District, Republic of Bashkortostan
- Sergeyevka, Sterlibashevsky District, Republic of Bashkortostan
- Sergeyevka, Ufimsky District, Republic of Bashkortostan

=== Voronezh Oblast ===
- Sergeyevka, Anninsky District, Voronezh Oblast
- Sergeyevka, Ertilsky District, Voronezh Oblast
- Sergeyevka, Paninsky District, Voronezh Oblast
- Sergeyevka, Podgorensky District, Voronezh Oblast
- Sergeyevka, Ternovsky District, Voronezh Oblast

== See also ==
- Sergeyev
