= Maria Sergeeva =

Maria Sergeeva may refer to:

- Maria Sergejeva (born 1992), Russian-Estonian figure skater
- Maria Sergeyeva (born 1985), Russian political activist and celebrity
- Maria Sergeeva (gymnast) (born 2001), Russian rhythmic gymnast

== See also ==
- Sergeeva
