= Sergheevca =

Sergheevca may refer to:

- Serhiivka, Kulevcha rural hromada, Bilhorod-Dnistrovskyi Raion, Odesa Oblast, known as Sergheevca in Romanian
- Serhiivka, Serhiivka settlement hromada, Bilhorod-Dnistrovskyi Raion, Odesa Oblast, known as Sergheevca in Romanian

== See also ==
- Serhiivka
- Sergeyevka (disambiguation)
