= Sergeyev =

Sergeyev (Russian: Сергеев) is a common Russian last name that is derived from the male given name Sergey and literally means Sergey's. It may refer to:

== People ==
- Aleksandr Sergeyev (disambiguation), several people
- Andrey Sergeyev (1893–1933), Soviet air pilot
- Alexei T. Sergeev (1919–1998), Soviet soloist with the Alexandrov Ensemble, and People's Artist of the USSR
- Anatoly Sergeyev (1940–2025), Soviet army officer and Hero of the Soviet Union
- Dmitri Sergeyev (judo) (born 1968), Russian judoka
- Dmitri Sergeyev (officer) (1922–2003), Russian officer and Hero of the Soviet Union
- Dmitri Sergeyev (politician), Russian politician
- Fyodor Sergeyev, real name of a Soviet statesman and party member Fyodor Artyom
- Gennady Sergeyev (1964–1993), FSB officer and Hero of Russia
- Igor Sergeev (born 1993), Uzbek football player
- Igor Sergeyev (1938–2006), Russian Defense Minister (1997–2001) and the only Marshal of the Russian Federation
- Ivan Sergeyev (1941–2024), Russian diplomat
- Ivan Sergeyev (Soviet politician) (1897–1942), member of the Soviet Central Committee
- Ivan Sergeyev (footballer) (born 1995), Russian football player
- Konstantin Sergeyev (1910–1992), Russian ballet danseur, artistic director and choreographer
- Nikolai Sergeyev (actor) (1894–1988), Soviet actor (Andrei Rublev (film))
- Nikolai Sergeyev (admiral) (1909–1999), Soviet military leader and admiral
- Nikolai Sergeyev (painter) (1908–1989), Russian painter
- Nikolay Sergeyev (1855–1919), Russian painter
- Nicholas Sergeyev (1876–1951), a Russian dancer and choreographer
- Oleg Sergeyev (born 1968), Soviet and Russian international soccer player
- Pyotr Sergeyev (1923–1945), Soviet army officer and Hero of the Soviet Union
- Sergey Sergeyev (footballer) (born 1965), Soviet and Russian footballer
- Sergei Sergeyev (canoeist), Kazakhstani canoeist
- Sergei Sergeyev (officer) (1919–1944), Soviet army officer and Hero of the Soviet Union
- Sergei Sergeyev (rugby), Russian rugby player
- Sergei Sergeyev (swimmer) (born 1970), Ukrainian and Turkish swimmer
- Sergei Sergeyev-Tsensky (1875–1958), Russian/Soviet writer and academic
- Vladimir Sergeyev (1883–1941), Soviet historian
- Vsevolod Sergeyev (1917–1984), Soviet aircraft pilot and Hero of the Soviet Union
- Yevgeni Sergeyev (1914–1999), Soviet geologist

== See also ==
- Sergeyeva, female variant of Sergeyev
- Sergeyev (horse), a racehorse
- Sergeyev (Kazakhstan), a town in the North Kazakhstan Region
- Sergeyevka (disambiguation)
