= National Christian Union (Romania) =

Romanian interwar proto-fascist party (1922-1923)

National Christian Union Uniunea Națională Creștină
- President: A. C. Cuza
- Vice president: Nicolae Paulescu
- Founded: 24 January 1922; 104 years ago
- Dissolved: 4 March 1923; 103 years ago
- Split from: Democratic Nationalist Party
- Succeeded by: National-Christian Defense League
- Newspaper: Apărarea Națională (1922-1938)
- Ideology: Christian nationalism Antisemitism; Aryanism
- Political position: Far-right
- Religion: Romanian Orthodoxy

The National Christian Union (Romanian: Uniunea Națională Creștină, UNC) was a proto-fascist, nationalist and antisemitic political party in the Kingdom of Romania, founded on 24 January 1922, by A. C. Cuza along other intellectuals such as Nicolae Paulescu, Corneliu Șumuleanu and Ion Zelea Codreanu (father of Corneliu Zelea Codreanu, the founder of the Legionary Movement).

== History ==
=== Emergence ===
The UNC emerged after A. C. Cuza parted ways with Nicolae Iorga due to ideological differences; after the Great War, Iorga had given up his antisemitic beliefs for a short period of time, only to return to them later in life, leading to a split within the Democratic Nationalist Party (Romanian: Partidul Naționalist-Democrat, PND), the party they had founded in 1910. Following the split, the two parties continued to coexist. Since Cuza had been left without an organization to promote his antisemitic platform at the height of antisemitic violence in 1922, he was compelled to establish this new organization, as the majority of Nationalist-Democrats had chosen to follow Nicolae Iorga.

Other founders of the UNC, besides A. C. Cuza and Nicolae Paulescu, included Corneliu Șumuleanu, Ion Zelea Codreanu, Teodor Naum and Alexandru Naum (sons of Anton Naum), I. D. Protopopescu, Constantin Dragu, and L. M. Sadoveanu. A particularly notable figure of the UNC was Constanța Câmpineanu (1870-1944), a member of the Moldavian branch of the Ghica noble family and wife of cavalry officer Grigore Ghica (1856-1912). The leaders of the UNC were all respected members of Moldavian society.

=== Activity ===
Throughout 1922 and early 1923, the UNC primarily engaged in agitation and propaganda activities. Most notably, in December 1922 in Cluj and Bucharest, the UNC printed manifestos supporting the Numerus Clausus policy and incited student violence. Students marched through the streets, shouting slogans such as "We want Numerus Clausus at the university for the Jews!" and assaulting Jews they encountered. The press at the time reported that the students clashed with the army sent to maintain order, leaving both students and soldiers wounded. Investigations by the prosecutor’s office in Bucharest indicated that the Numerus Clausus manifestos had been ordered to be printed by "professor Naum", it is, however, unclear which one of the Naum brothers the press referred to, as both were professors.

=== Reception ===
In an interpellation in the Chamber of Deputies in December 1922, Romanian-Jewish deputy Adolphe Stern, who was primarily preoccupied with the "Jewish question" and the surge of antisemitism, raised concerns about the violent means and agitation propaganda of the UNC, denying its national character on the grounds of its affiliation with international antisemitic organizations, and further accused it of morally corrupting the scholarly youth. Stern urged the government to take measures against the UNC, warning that it could damage Romania’s reputation, and declared that "Greater Romania must, and is obliged to, enrich the cultural treasury of the world and to take its place alongside the peoples who bear the torch of civilization".

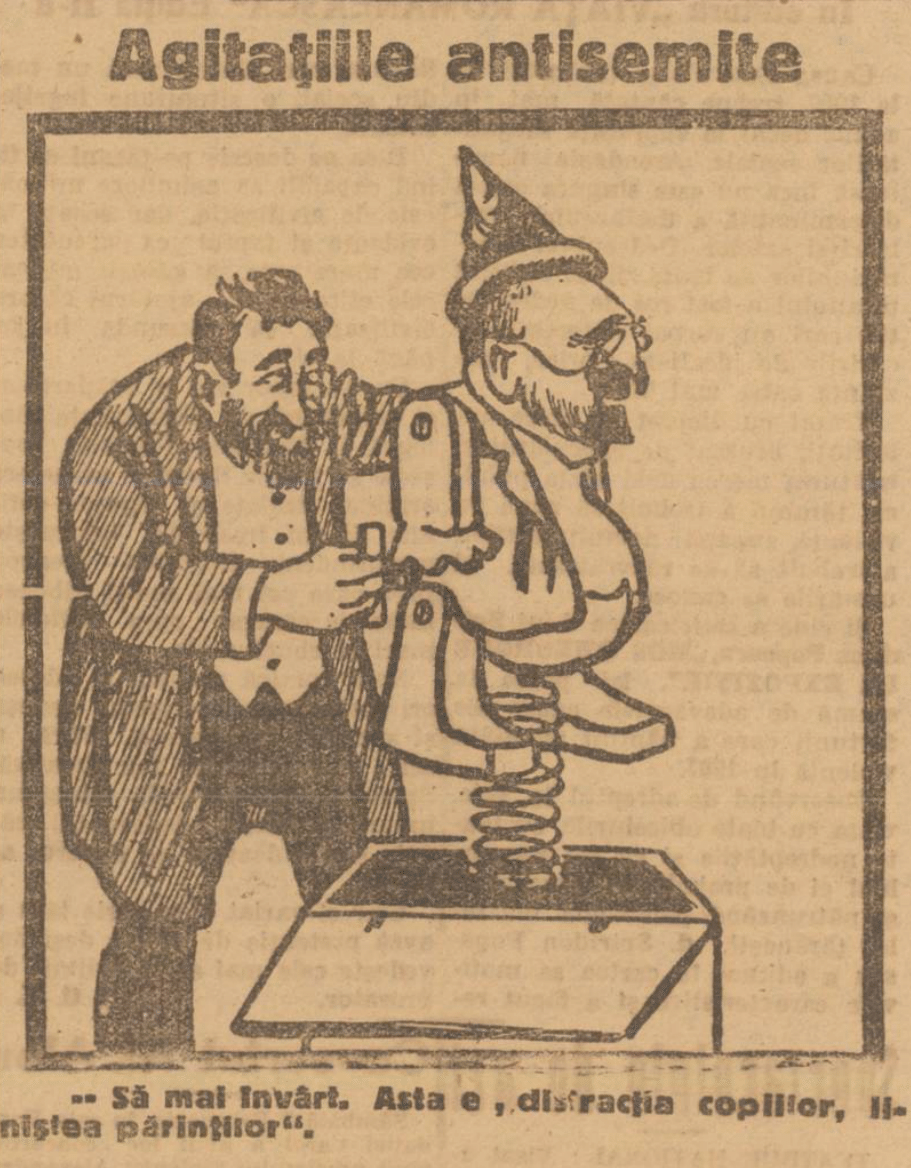
Cartoon depicting Ion I. C. Brătianu using A. C. Cuza as a spinning toy. The cartoon refers to the accusation that the Brătianu cabinet encouraged antisemitic violence as a diversion while the 1923 Constitution was being passed.

The Ion I. C. Brătianu cabinet responded by recognizing the antisemitic disturbances but tried to present the government as active and responsible. Minister of Public Instruction Constantin Angelescu acknowledged the situation and argued that he had taken steps to punish those involved, though his actions were criticized as slow and inconsistent, sometimes seen as favoring Cuza. Interior Minister Artur Văitoianu condemned the student violence as harmful to Romania’s reputation, but also pointed to what he called provocations from the Jewish side. Prime Minister Ion I. C. Brătianu emphasized the need for national harmony, warning that divisive actions threatened the country’s interests and stating that the government was prepared to apply firm measures to maintain order.

On 25 December, the left-leaning newspapers Adevărul (English: The Truth) and Dimineața (English: The Morning) reported that Cuza’s antisemitic publications featured the swastika and pointed out its antisemitic Pan-Germanic origins and usage. At the same time, they described the UNC as a branch of an "international antisemitic organization", a tool with which the "Pan-Germans thought they could overthrow the order of Europe". It is true, however, that Cuza had connections with German Völkisch, antisemitic, and nationalist groups, whose members he had come into contact with through the periodical Der Hammer (English: The Hammer). Beginning in 1911, he maintained an active correspondence with the German antisemite Heinrich Kraeger, a member of the Deutsch-Völkischer Schriftstellerverband (English: Völkisch-German Authors’ Association), with whom he frequently exchanged ideological viewpoints. In October 1920, Kraeger invited Cuza to an "international Aryan meeting" in Hungary, and in June 1921, he sent him another invitation to an antisemitic meeting in Germany, scheduled for August.

Later that month, on 29 December, Ostjüdische Zeitung (English: Eastern Jewish Newspaper), the newspapers of the National Jewish Party in Bukovina chaired by Mayer Ebner, criticized a UNC pamphlet, noting that although the UNC's by-law claimed to protect Romanians from being "submerged everywhere by the Jews", this did not justify Cuza's use of the Pan-Germanic swastika as a symbol of his own. It was further argued that Cuza’s antisemitism largely copied German models and that antisemitism in Romania was an imported ideology rather than a native one.

In February 1923, an article in the Aurora newspaper, directed by Nicolae L. Lupu, a left-wing politician of the Peasants' Party, criticized the lack of concrete measures to halt antisemitic violence, pointing out that students were frequently punished whereas the agitators were not. Newspapers and publications of various student associations were confiscated or suspended, but antisemitic publications such as Apărarea Națională (English: National Defence) or Naționalistul (English: The Nationalist), Cuza's own newspapers, continued to appear. The Ion I. C. Brătianu cabinet was subsequently accused of having ties to A. C. Cuza and his associates, which explained the inconsistency in intervening in the issue and the tolerance of the antisemitic violence, seen as a diversion meant to draw public attention elsewhere while the Parliament passed the 1923 Constitution, deemed despotic by the author.

=== Merger ===
The UNC was considered too weak to represent Christian nationalism, and it was necessary for the antisemitic student movement to become organized. Thus, on 4 March 1923, capitalizing on the momentum of the antisemitic student movement, Cuza went on to found the National-Christian Defense League (Romanian: Liga Apărării Național-Creștine, LANC), the official successor of the UNC, whose new goal, according to Corneliu Zelea Codreanu, was to organize and guide the supporters of the antisemitic student movement and to politicize the rural population.

== Politics ==
=== Platform and ideology ===
The Union adopted a virulent antisemitic stance, with antisemitism holding a central place in its periodical publications, surpassing the anti-political and anti-communist concerns of other contemporary organizations. In April 1922, Cuza founded the periodical Apărarea Națională to promote his antisemitic platform, reinforcing stereotypes and hostility toward Jews. Its first issue supported the antisemitic student movement by reproducing a leaflet that accused Jews of dominating the University of Cluj and called for protests against "Jewish terror" and a Numerus clausus policy to be introduced in universities.

"Through the establishment of the periodical Apărarea Națională, the initiative committee of the National Christian Union sought to create an organ that would defend Romania’s national interests on cultural, economic, and political fronts. Nearly all the nationalities currently living in Greater Romania have a press that safeguards their national interests, and it is notable that the Romanian nationality alone lacks a publication with a clearly defined national character." - Fragment extracted from the first issue of the periodical Apărarea Națională. Year I, No. 1, April 1, 1922.

In the same issue of the periodical, the concept of the "Jewish question" was introduced along with its supposed cause; according to Cuza, this "question" derived from the alleged violation of the "law of the territory" by Jews, who, lacking a national state of their own, were depicted in antisemitic terms as having developed a nomadic and "parasitic nature" by exploiting the peoples among whom they settled.

Thus, its main ideological goal was to forcefully solve the so-called "Jewish question", aiming to "fight by all legal means for the support of the economic, political, and cultural interests of Romanians, against the Jews, and for the defense of nationalist, democratic, and Christian ideas." Some of the measures prescribed in UNC’s platform published in 1923 included: the removal of Jews from rural areas and from positions across all fields of activity (the army, universities, public companies, etc.); segregation of Jewish children in education; limiting the proportion of Jewish students in universities (Numerus clausus); and favoring Christians in commerce and the economy.

In his works and in later issues of Apărarea Națională, Cuza added various biological and especially theological undertones to the ideology he would go on to call "Cuzism", the "Antisemitism of immediate action" or the "Science of Antisemitism". Although Cuza had not been particularly interested in the theological dimension, he did have some works that addressed this subject. The biological and theological arguments for Cuza's monomaniac antisemitism were further developed under the influence of Nicolae Paulescu, whereas Cuza’s earlier concerns had focused primarily on the economic "threat" Jews were said to represent for Romania. Cuza had explained the way the Jews supposedly survived throughout history through parasitism in a pseudoscientific theory structured in three processes: mimicry — by which Jews were said to incorporate themselves into the host society, making discrete exploitation appear natural; nomadism — which supposedly allowed Jews to remain continuously on the move; and the isolation of peoples — the idea that limited communication between different peoples prevented them from warning each other about the “danger” Jews were claimed to represent. In this regard, Ana Bărbulescu, a researcher at the Elie Wiesel National Institute for Studying the Holocaust in Romania, points out Cuza’s ideological inconsistencies in an article compiled in a larger volume called "The Cultural Elite and Antisemitic Rhetoric in Interwar Romania":

"Logical coherence does not seem to have been one of A.C. Cuza’s strengths: if mimicry ensured the ‘invisibility’ of the Jews in the territories where they had settled, what could the host peoples have communicated to one another about them? In the same manner, why would they have developed this mimicry at all, if they were structurally a nomadic people and their nature commanded them to wander rather than to settle?"

=== Use of the swastika ===
A. C. Cuza pushed various pseudoscientific theories with mystical undertones concerning the origins of the swastika and its supposed connection to the Romanian people. Cuza had not developed a coherent definition of the swastika, but instead combined ideas from various Romanian and international sources, complemented by his own. In June 1922, Cuza offered an explanation of the swastika in the periodical Apărarea Națională. He described it as a "sign of salvation" (Romanian: semnul mântuirei [sic]), mentioned its Sanskrit name, and emphasized its obscure origins. He went on to explain that the swastika was associated with both the Brahmins and the Buddhists, as well as with solar worship, ultimately calling it the "distinctive sign of the Aryan race".

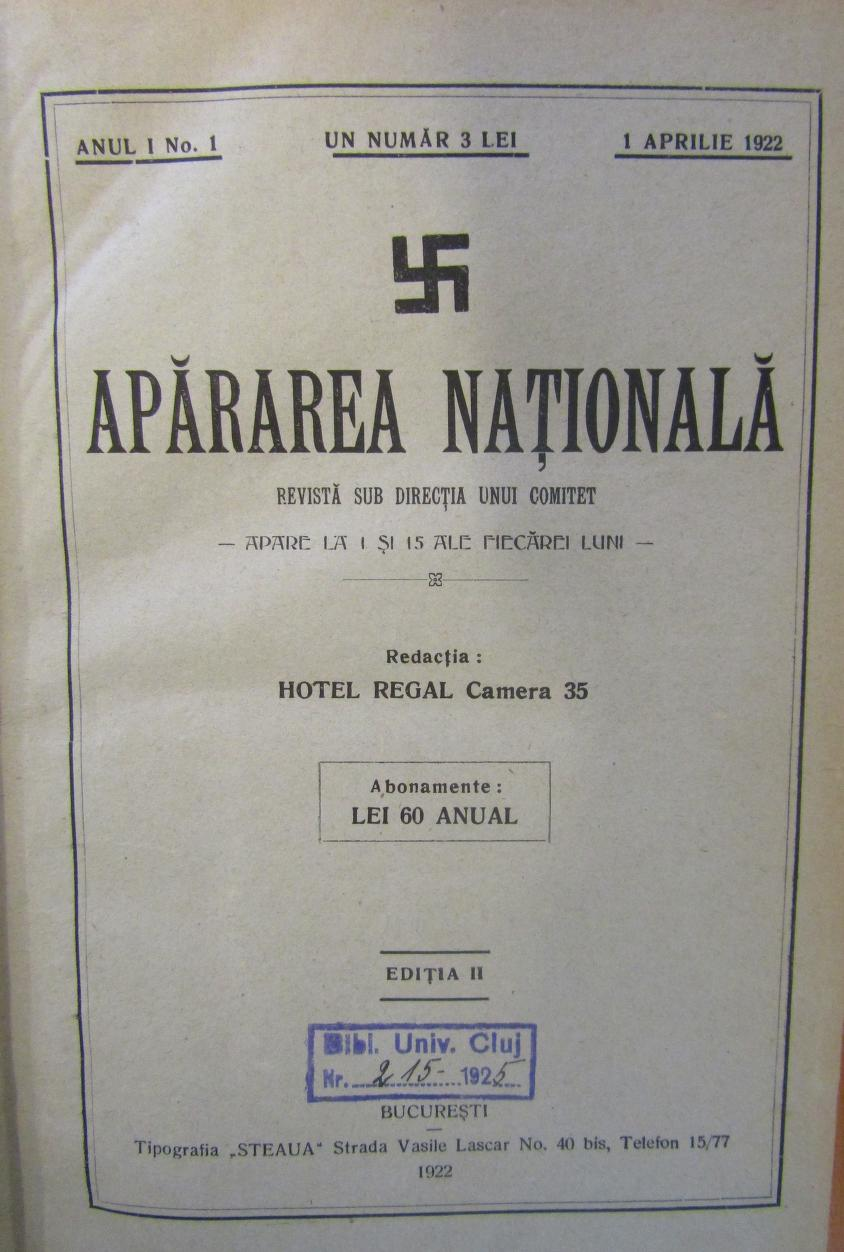
Title page of the first issue of the periodical Apărarea Națională.

Other suggestive examples of Cuza's inconsistency in defining the swastika include the correlation he made between the Pelasgians and the Romanians; he described the swastika as a cross-shaped symbol used by the ancient Pelasgians, whom he claimed were the ancestors of modern Romanians. In 1925, he portrayed the swastika as an early form of the Christian cross, linking it to both Christianity and Aryanism by referring to it as the "Aryan cross", he later declared that two symbols are distinct. The linking of the swastika with the Christian cross was opportunistic, as it resonated with the religiosity of the Romanians.

Cuza never explained his sudden conversion to Orthodox Christianity during the interwar period either, having previously been a staunch atheist, and his lack of interest to establish a coherent connection between the swastika and Christianity suggests how little the faith meant to him. Ultimately, what was essential to Cuza was the antisemitic meaning of the swastika.

Cuza had been in contact with German nationalists and antisemites since 1911, whom he had met through the periodical Der Hammer. Despite his claims of an indigenous Romanian origin of the swastika, he likely adopted the swastika from the German antisemite Heinrich Kraeger, with whom he kept correspondence, and tried to dismiss the fact that UNC's symbolism came from Germany.

== See also ==
- History of the Jews in Romania
- Völkisch movement
- Antisemitism in Romania
- Antisemitism in Europe
- National Christian Party
- Kingdom of Romania under Fascism
