= Sherekino, Kudintsevsky selsoviet, Lgovsky District, Kursk Oblast =

Rural locality in Kursk Oblast, Russia

Sherekino Шерекино
- Settlement
- Interactive map of Sherekino
- Location of Sherekino Sherekino (Kursk Oblast)
- Coordinates: 51°41′36″N 35°14′48″E
- Country: Russia
- Federal subject: Kursk Oblast
- Administrative district: Lgovsky District
- SelsovietSelsoviet: Kudintsevky

Population (2010 Census)
  - Total: 171
  - Estimate (2010): 171 (0%)

Municipal status
  - Municipal district: Lgovsky Municipal District
  - Rural settlement: Kudintsevky Selsoviet Rural Settlement
- Time zone: UTC+3 (MSK)
- Postal code: 307754
- Dialing code: +7 47140
- OKTMO ID: 38622450116
- Website: kudincevo.ru

Sherekino (Russian: Шерекино) is a rural locality (a settlement at the railway station) in Kudintsevky Selsoviet Rural Settlement, Lgovsky District, Kursk Oblast, Russia. Population: 171 (2010 census); 186 (2002 census);

== Geography ==
The settlement is located on the Seym River, 52 km from the Russia–Ukraine border, 65.5 km west of Kursk, 3.5 km north of the district center – the town Lgov, 5 km from the selsoviet center – Kudintsevo.

Climate

Sherekino has a warm-summer humid continental climate (Dfb in the Köppen climate classification).

== Transport ==
Sherekino is located 6 km from the road of regional importance 38K-017 (Kursk – Lgov – Rylsk – border with Ukraine), 2 km from the road 38K-042 (38K-017 – Lgov), on the road of intermunicipal significance 38Н-440 (Lgov – Kudintsevo), next to the railway station Sherekino (railway line Navlya – Lgov-Kiyevsky).

The rural locality is situated 72 km from Kursk Vostochny Airport, 148 km from Belgorod International Airport and 275 km from Voronezh Peter the Great Airport.
