= Budaki Lagoon =

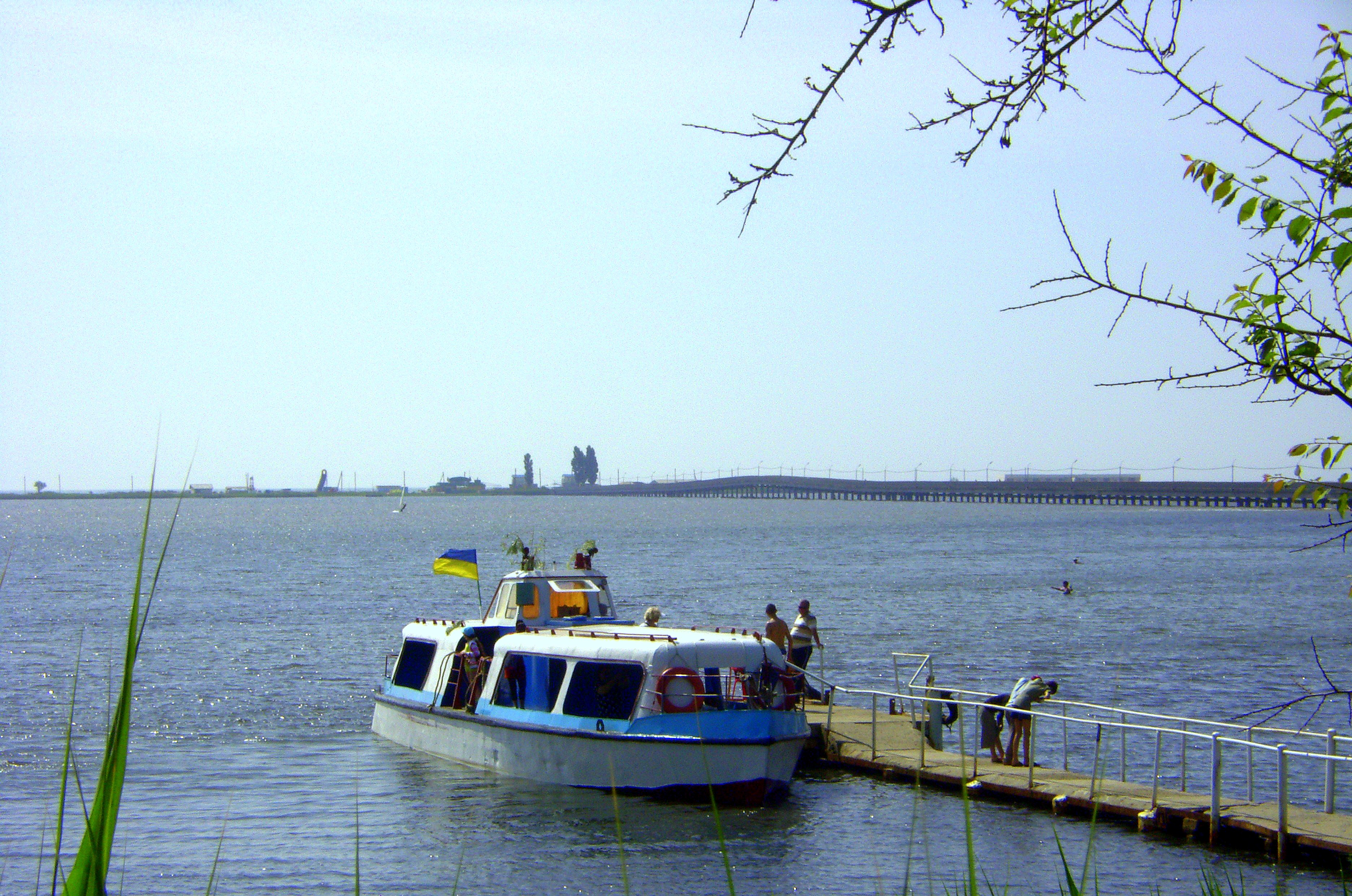
- Budaki Lagoon near Serhiivka

- Location within Ukraine
- Location: Black Sea
- Coordinates: 46°00′N 30°21′E
- Ocean/sea sources: Atlantic Ocean
- Basin countries: Ukraine
- Max. length: 17 km (11 mi)
- Max. width: 2.5 km (1.6 mi)
- Surface area: 31 km^{2} (12 sq mi)
- Average depth: 1.05 m (3.4 ft)
- Max. depth: 2.2 m (7.2 ft)
- Water volume: 31 million cubic metres (1.1×10^{9} cu ft)
- Salinity: ~14‰
- Settlements: Serhiivka

Budaki, or Budaksky Lagoon (other names: Shabolatsky Liman, Shabolat, Budaksky Liman; Ukrainian: Будацький лиман, Шаболат, Romanian: Limanul Budachi, Şabolat) is a Black Sea lagoon (liman) in Bessarabia, southern Ukraine. Located in 18 km from the city of Bilhorod-Dnistrovskyi. The lagoon is separated from the Black Sea by the 80–200 m wide sandbar. The health spa urban-type settlement of Serhiivka is located on the coasts of the Budaki Lagoon.

The temporary connection between the lagoon and the sea is organised via artificial canal «Budaki» (on the southern west), sometime via natural erosion (washout) of the sandbar. The lagoon is connected to the Dniester Estuary via canals «Bugaz-1» and «Bugaz-2». In the central part of the lagoon, in the urban-type settlement of Serhiivka, the bridge is connect the town with the sandbar.

The lagoon has 17 km long, 1.5 km wide, 0.8-2.4 m elevation, area of 27–32 km^{2}. The length of the sandbar is about 18 km, its width is 80–200 m. The lagoon is shallow, maximal depth up to 2.2 m, average 1.05 m. In summer the temperature of the water is 26-28°С, up to 33 °C on shallow water.

In the last 20 years the salinity of the liman is ranged between 2 and 32‰. Now the most desalinated part is the Akkembet Bay and the northeast of the lagoon, which connected to the Dniester Estuary (Salinity 2-14‰), and maximal mineralization is in southwest (15-32‰).

The name of the lagoon, Budaki is the old name of the village of Prymorske, which origine from Turkish: Bucak, means "corner", "nook". Another name of the lagoon, Shabolat, is origine from the name of another village, Shabo (Turkish: Acha-abag - lower gardens), which located north from the lagoon.
