= National-Christian Defense League =

National-Christian Defense League Liga Apărării Național Creștine
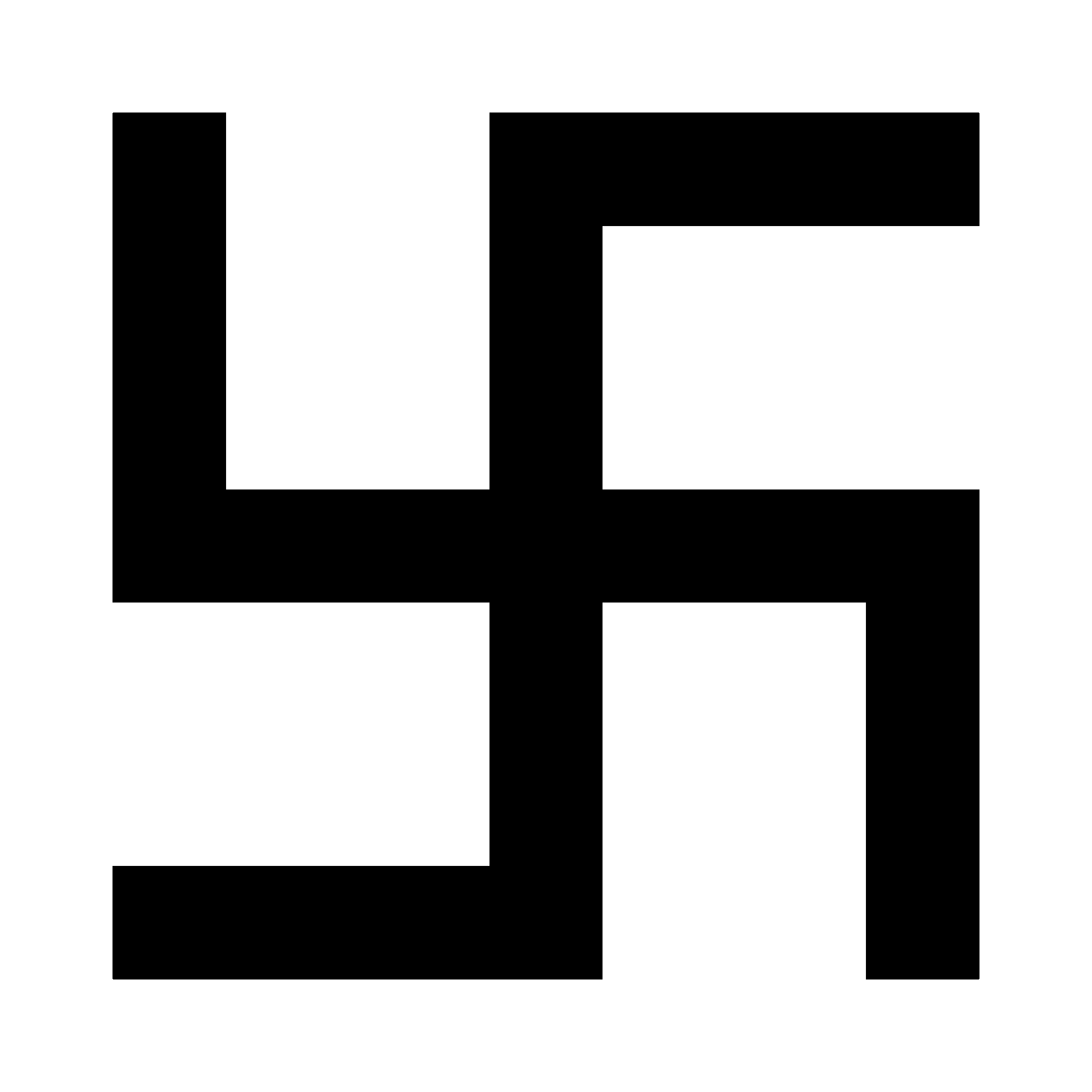
- Governing body: Grand Council of LANC
- Standing Committee: Central Committee of LANC
- Supreme president: A.C. Cuza
- Vice president(s): Nicolae Paulescu (1923-1928); Corneliu Șumuleanu (1923-1927); Ion Zelea Codreanu (1923-1927)
- General secretary: Nichifor Crainic (1934-1935)
- Founder: A. C. Cuza; Corneliu Zelea Codreanu; Corneliu Șumuleanu; Ion Tarnoschi; Ion Zelea Codreanu; Nicolae Paulescu
- Founded: 4 March 1923; 103 years ago
- Dissolved: 16 July 1935; 91 years ago
- Preceded by: National Christian Union
- Merged into: National Agrarian Party
- Succeeded by: National Christian Party
- Headquarters: Bucharest, Kingdom of Romania
- Newspaper: Apărarea Națională (1922-1938); Înfrățirea Românească (1924-1931); Lancea (1925-1926)
- Youth wing: L.A.N.C. Youth
- Paramilitary wing(s): Lancers; Assault Battalions (from 1933); Steel Guards
- Ideology: Cuzism; Romanian nationalism; Clerical fascism; Corporate statism; Anti-communism; Antisemitism; Monarchism; Statism; Nazism
- Political position: Far-right
- Religion: Romanian Orthodoxy
- Colours: Blue Yellow Red; Brown (customary)
- Slogan: Ro: Hristos, Regele, Națiunea - România Românilor; En: Christ, King, Nation - Romania for the Romanians

Party flag
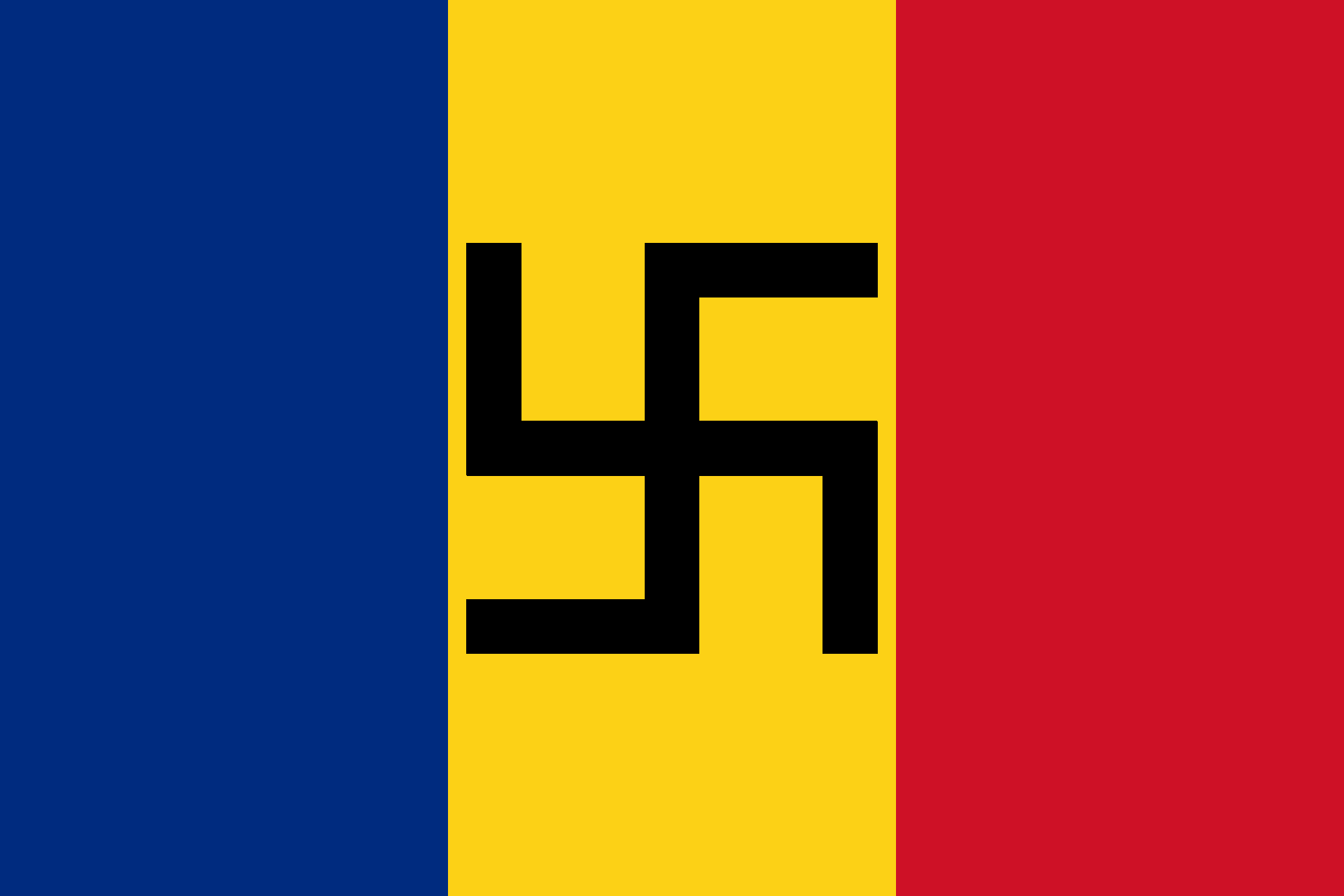

The National-Christian Defense League (Romanian: Liga Apărării Național-Creștine, abbreviated LANC) was a far-right ultranationalist and antisemitic political party in interwar Romania.

The founding congress took place on March 4, 1923, in the Great Hall of the University of Iași. Professor Alexandru C. Cuza was elected as president. For this reason, members and supporters of the movement were also known as Cuzists (Romanian: Cuziști). Corneliu Zelea Codreanu was tasked with organizing LANC throughout the entire country. On March 26, 1923, the Romanian Parliament amended Article 7 of the 1923 Constitution, granting full citizenship by default to all Jews residing in the country. LANC opposed this measure and called on students to stage protests. Clashes with the police ensued. In these student demonstrations, Corneliu Zelea Codreanu played a significant role; at the time, he was a member of LANC and would later go on to found the Legionary Movement.

Under General Averescu's third government cabinet (1926-1927), LANC held 10 seats in the Chamber of Deputies. In 1927, the Legion of the Archangel Michael, led by Corneliu Zelea Codreanu, broke away from LANC. Codreanu had failed to secure a seat in the Chamber in the May 1926 elections.

== Origins ==
=== The antisemitic student movement of 1922 ===
After the Great Union of 1918, Romanian universities experienced a significant influx of students from the newly annexed regions. Many of these students belonged to various ethnic minorities, particularly the Jewish minority. The increasing presence of minority students, coupled with the fact that some of them expressed sympathy for communist ideology, provoked varied reactions among Romanian students.

A 1922-1923 statistical report by Vasiliu Em. D. B. highlighted the large number of Jewish students at Romanian universities, particularly in Cernăuți and Iași. At the University of Cernăuți, the Faculty of Pharmacy had 174 Romanian and 574 Jewish students, while the Faculty of Law had 506 Jewish students, compared to 237 Orthodox (Romanians and Ruthenians) and smaller numbers of other denominations. Similarly, at the University of Iași, Jewish students were numerous: in Medicine, there were 831 Jewish and 547 Romanian students; in Pharmacy, 299 Jewish and 97 Romanian students; in Law, 370 Jewish and 1743 Romanian students; in Letters, 100 Jewish and 351 Romanian students; and in Sciences, 321 Jewish and 722 Romanian students.

Ethnic groups in Romania, 1930
Ethnicity	Population	%
Romanians	12,981,324	71.9
Hungarians	1,425,507	7.9
Germans	745,421	4.1
Jews	728,115	4
Ruthenians & Ukrainians	582,115	3.2
Russians	409,150	2.3
Bulgarians	366,384	2
Romani	262,501	1.5
Other	556,511	3.1
Total	18,057,028	100

For the older nationalist and antisemitic university professors (such as A. C. Cuza and Ion Găvănescu), this was a warning sign. They were concerned about the ethnic composition of the universities, the future political class, and the cultural integrity of the Romanian state.

“But who are the pupils and students of today? The present day students are the professors, doctors, engineers, lawyers, prefects, parliamentarians, cabinet ministers of tomorrow, in one word, the future leaders of the people in all domains of activity.

If present day students are 50, 60, 70% Jews, tomorrow we will logically have 50, 60, 70% Jewish leaders for this Romanian people.

Can one still raise the question whether a nation has the right to limit the number of alien students in its universities?” - Corneliu Zelea Codreanu, For My Legionaries (1936 original edition / 2024 cited edition)

The movement effectively gained momentum during the protests of 10 December 1922. Between 3,000 and 4,000 students from across the country gathered in the amphitheater of the Faculty of Medicine at the University of Bucharest, where they went on general strike to protest poor living conditions in student campuses. At the top of their list of demands was the implementation of the Numerus Clausus, which called for limiting the number of students from ethnic minorities to their proportion within the general population of the country.

This moment was both preceded and followed by a series of violent, agitational, and propagandistic actions initiated by various antisemitic and ultranationalist student groups. It ultimately culminated with the emergence of two of the most important far-right movements in interwar Romania – the National-Christian Defense League in 1923 and the Legion of the Archangel Michael in 1927.

== Mobilizing the supporters ==
=== Emergence ===
At the end of 1923, Corneliu Zelea Codreanu and other leaders of the antisemitic student movement were arrested for planning a series political assassinations, but were released shortly afterward due to massive public support. In 1924, the conflict with state authorities escalated, culminating in the assassination of police prefect Constantin Manciu by Codreanu. These events – marked by violence, repression, and demonstrations of support from students and Cuzist sympathizers – significantly contributed to the growing popularity of LANC.

Following Codreanu's wedding in 1925, which was attended by between 80,000 and 100,000 people, a series of baptisms for the children of the Cuzist sympathizers took place. These events proved to be an effective propaganda tool. After clashes broke out between sympathizers who had come to baptize their children and the public order authorities, the state was forced to halt the baptisms organized by Codreanu and A. C. Cuza. In this context, LANC succeeded in creating the impression that the Romanian state was anti-Christian.

LANC continued to rely on the tactic of provoking reactions from state authorities, often by encouraging situations that led to trials involving Cuzist sympathizers. These legal proceedings frequently resulted in acquittals or rulings of innocence, either due to the considerable public pressure placed on the judiciary or as a result of the tacit support shown by certain officials sympathetic to the Cuzists.

=== Growth ===
LANC aimed to transform its public support into electoral success, which led the movement to strengthen its ties with other nationalist groups. In addition to infiltrating and instrumentalizing the Arcași (English: Archers) organizations – gradually absorbing them into the League – LANC also merged, in 1925, with the National Romanian Fascio and the Romanian Action movements – organizations which, as Codreanu stated in For My Legionaries, lacked “the power of action, the power of organization, and the strength of doctrine” that characterized LANC.

== The flags and the swastika ==
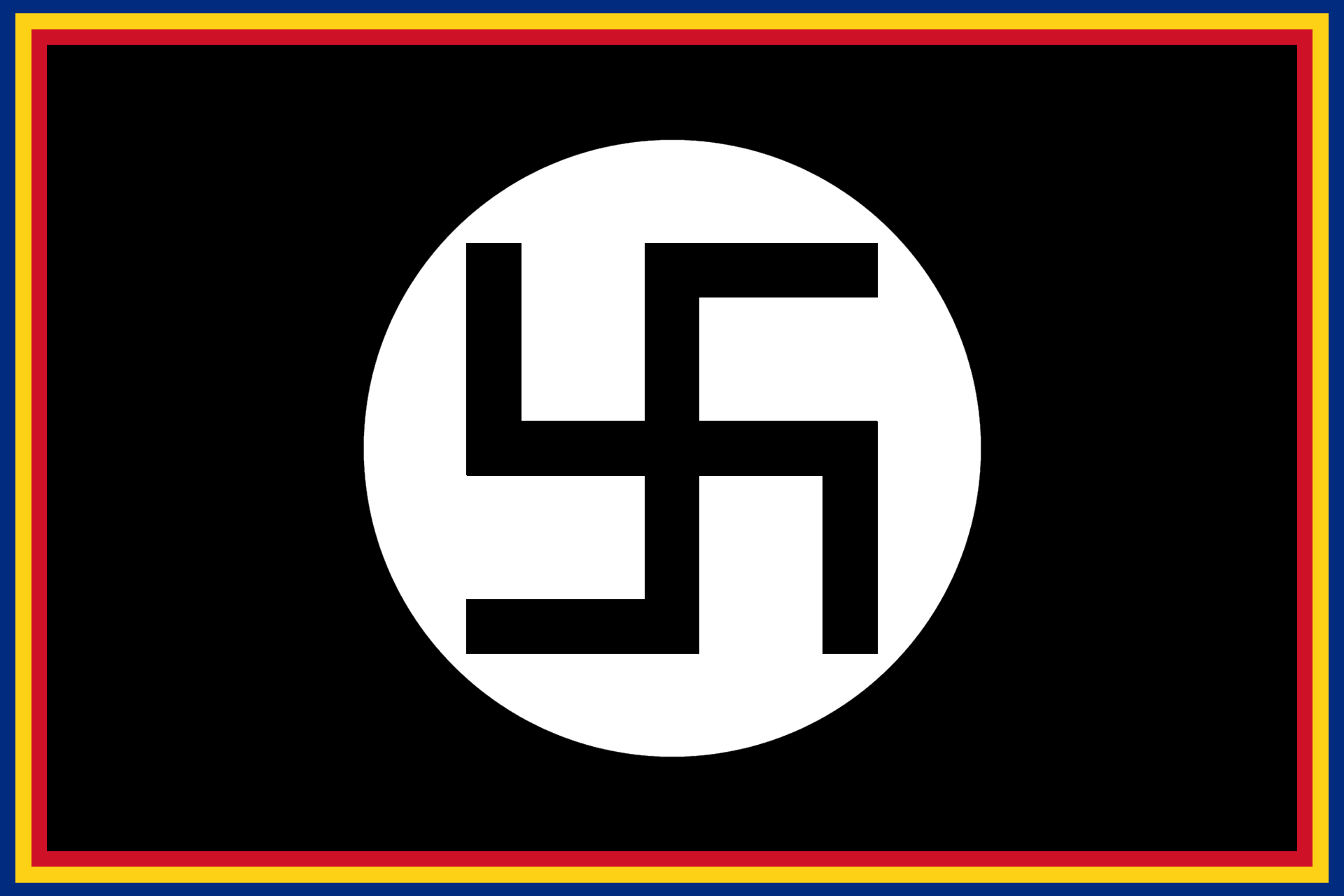
LANC 1923 mourning flag, as described by Corneliu Zelea Codreanu in „For my legionnaires”

Corneliu Zelea Codreanu describes the early flag of the League in his memoirs, For My Legionaries:

“[...] The cloth of these flags was black - a sign of mourning; in the center a round white spot, signifying our hopes surrounded by the darkness they will have to conquer; in the center of the white, a swastika, the symbol of antisemitic struggle throughout the world; and all around the flag, a band of the Romanian tricolor-red, yellow and blue. Professor Cuza had approved while in Bucharest the form of these flags [...]”

The swastika was adopted in 1922 by the predecessor of LANC, the National-Christian Union (Romanian: Uniunea Națională Creștină, UNC). The president of UNC, A. C. Cuza, described the swastika as a cross-shaped symbol used by the ancient Pelasgians, whom he claimed were the ancestors of modern Romanians.

“This symbol (the swastika) is the ‘Aryan Cross,’ that is, the cross which the ancient Aryans, tens of thousands of years ago, used as a protective sign against evil and as a talisman of good fortune. [...] This symbol is all the more appropriate as its central form represents the holy Christian cross – against which the Jews, in particular, are waging a satanic struggle – and which we Christians must defend, lest it be overthrown and desecrated by the Jews, as has happened in unfortunate Russia.” - (1925) “Călăuza bunilor români”

Despite Cuza's claims of an indigenous Romanian origin, he likely adopted the swastika from the German antisemite Heinrich Kraeger, with whom he kept correspondence. The official version of the LANC flag was the Romanian tricolor flag with an upright (non-tilted) swastika centered on the yellow stripe. This variant continued to be used by the National Christian Party until 1938.

“CHAPTER XVII – Flags of LANC

Article 38. - The flag of LANC is the national tricolor flag of the country, bearing the symbol of the “Swastika,” in black, on the yellow center stripe.

The flags of the various LANC organizations will differ in size and details, each bearing the inscription of its respective organization: the Village, the Commune, the County, the Region, and the Central Committee. These will be manufactured according to the specifications provided by their respective committees.” - (1925) “Călăuza bunilor români”

== General organization ==
=== Structure ===
The leadership of the National-Christian Defense League was organized hierarchically, with a Supreme President (role occupied by A. C. Cuza) at the top, elected by the General Assembly of LANC, which consisted of all members of the organization. He was supported by a Central Committee composed of 24 members, of whom 12 were directly appointed by the Supreme President, 6 were presidents of the regional committees, and the remaining 6 were delegates from the six Regional Committees. At the lower levels, there were Regional, County, and Communal Committees, each consisting of 9-15 members, whose formation required the approval of the higher-ranking committee. Above these operated the Grand Council of LANC, made up of the Central Committee and one delegate from each Regional and County Committee, which could be convened at any time by the Supreme President. The organization's activity was financially supported through donations, membership fees, and various forms of self-funding, and the entire leadership was obligated to mobilize and involve members in spreading the League's ideology and objectives. The Statute of LANC could only be modified by the Grand Council and was supplemented by a specific set of regulations.

“Călăuza bunilor români” (1925) [The Guide for Good Romanians] - includes the statue, regulations and political program of LANC.

=== The Brotherhoods ===
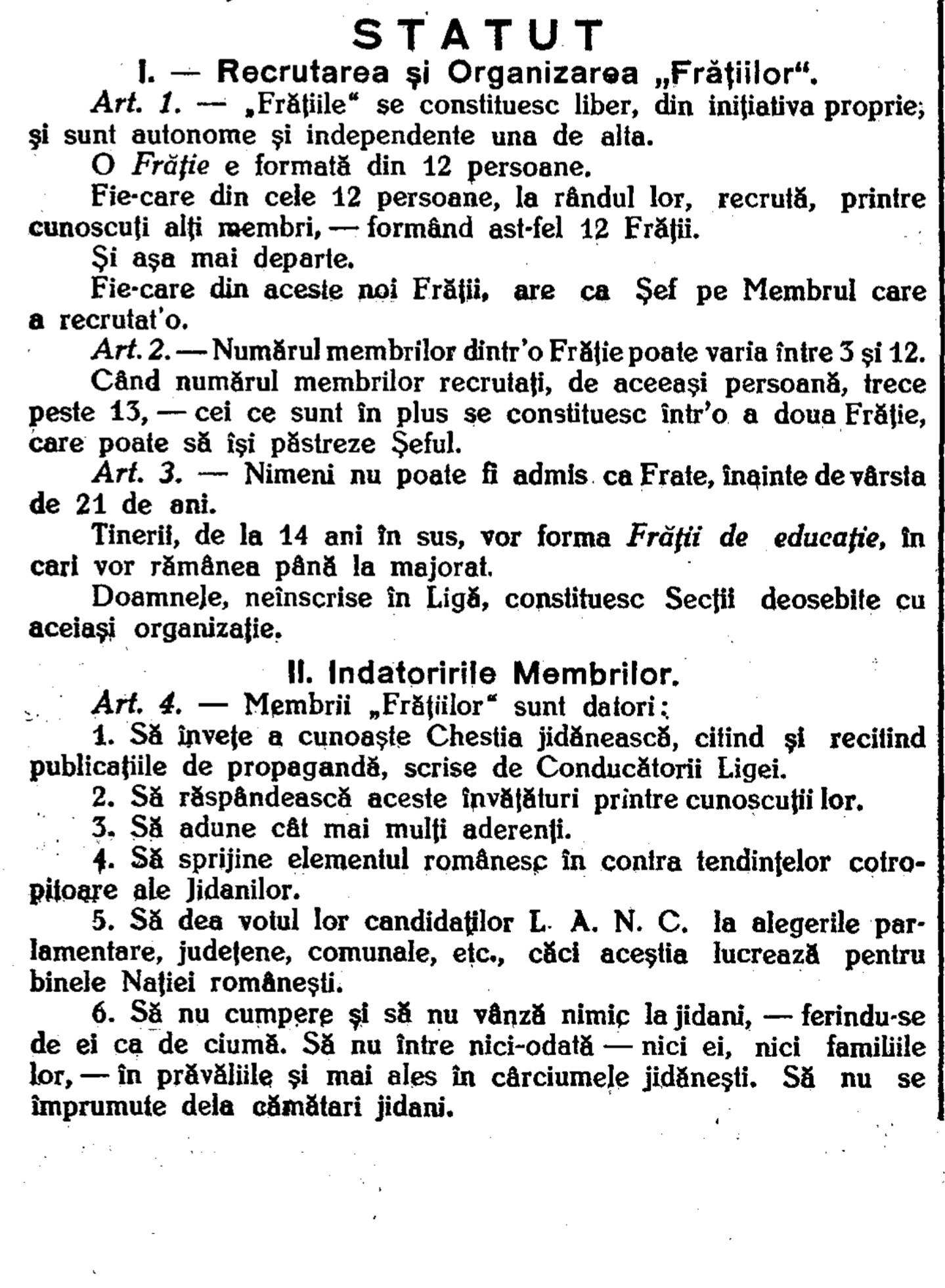
The regulatory status of the LANC Brotherhoods defines their roles and duties as the core organizational cells of the League of National Christian Defense (LANC).

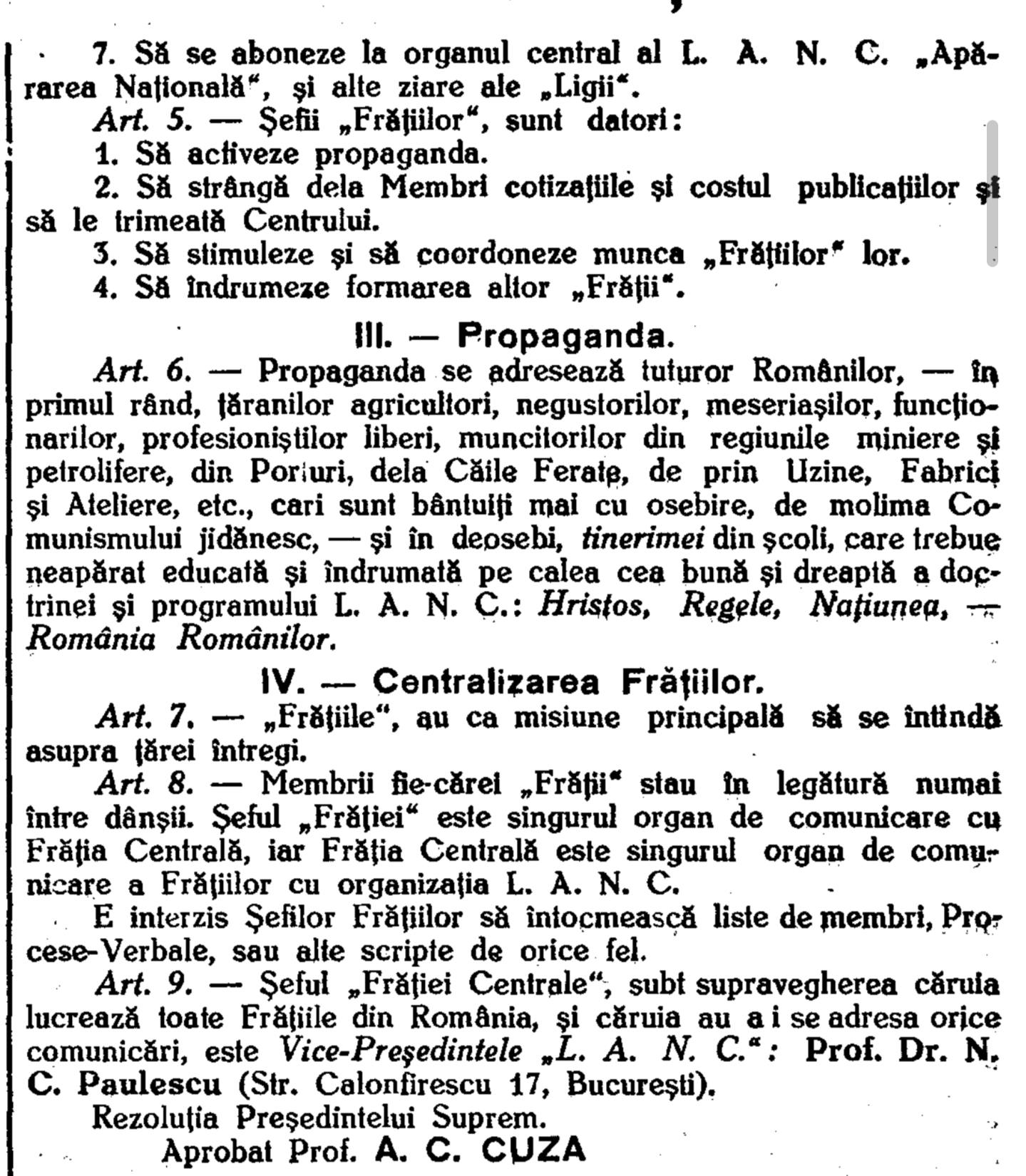
Continuation

The basic organizational unit of LANC was the “Brotherhood” (Romanian: Frăție). These brotherhoods were formed voluntarily by members of LANC and consisted of between 3 and 13 individuals. While they operated independently and autonomously from one another, they were subordinated to a central body known as the “Central Brotherhood” (Romanian: Frăția Centrală), led by Nicolae Paulescu.

Among the duties of brotherhood members were: educating themselves on the so-called “Jewish question”, spreading LANC propaganda, recruiting new members, voting for LANC candidates during elections, etc.

This form of organization was later adopted and implemented within the Legionary Movement by Corneliu Zelea Codreanu, under the names “Nests” and “Brotherhoods of the Cross”.

=== The LANC Youth organization ===
The youth wing of LANC was composed predominantly of university students from across Romania, students from upper-level secondary schools, as well as young graduates already active in the workforce. Female students were recruited into sections specifically designated for women. LANC's youth organization was structured into sections corresponding to each year of study. The section was the basic organizational unit of the LANC youth, and each was led by a president, elected by students and later appointed by the Central Committee, two vice presidents, who assisted the president or replaced him when needed, and a secretary, responsible for maintaining a register of members.

Multiple section presidents from the same faculty or institution formed the Faculty/School Council. This council elected a Dean, who was subsequently confirmed by the Central Committee of LANC. The deans of each faculty or higher-education institution collectively formed the University Senate. The Senate then elected a Rector, who was officially appointed by the Central Committee and served as the representative of LANC's youth within the university center.

To coordinate the activities of the LANC youth, the Central Committee appointed an Inspection Committee made up of university-educated LANC members. Each inspector was responsible for a specific domain, such as: publications (newspapers, magazines, pamphlets), religious guidance, propaganda, coordination of women's and educational sections, and the organization of recreational activities (excursions, sports, etc.). The entire Inspection Committee, along with the other university organizations, operated under the direct supervision of the Central Committee through a General Delegate.

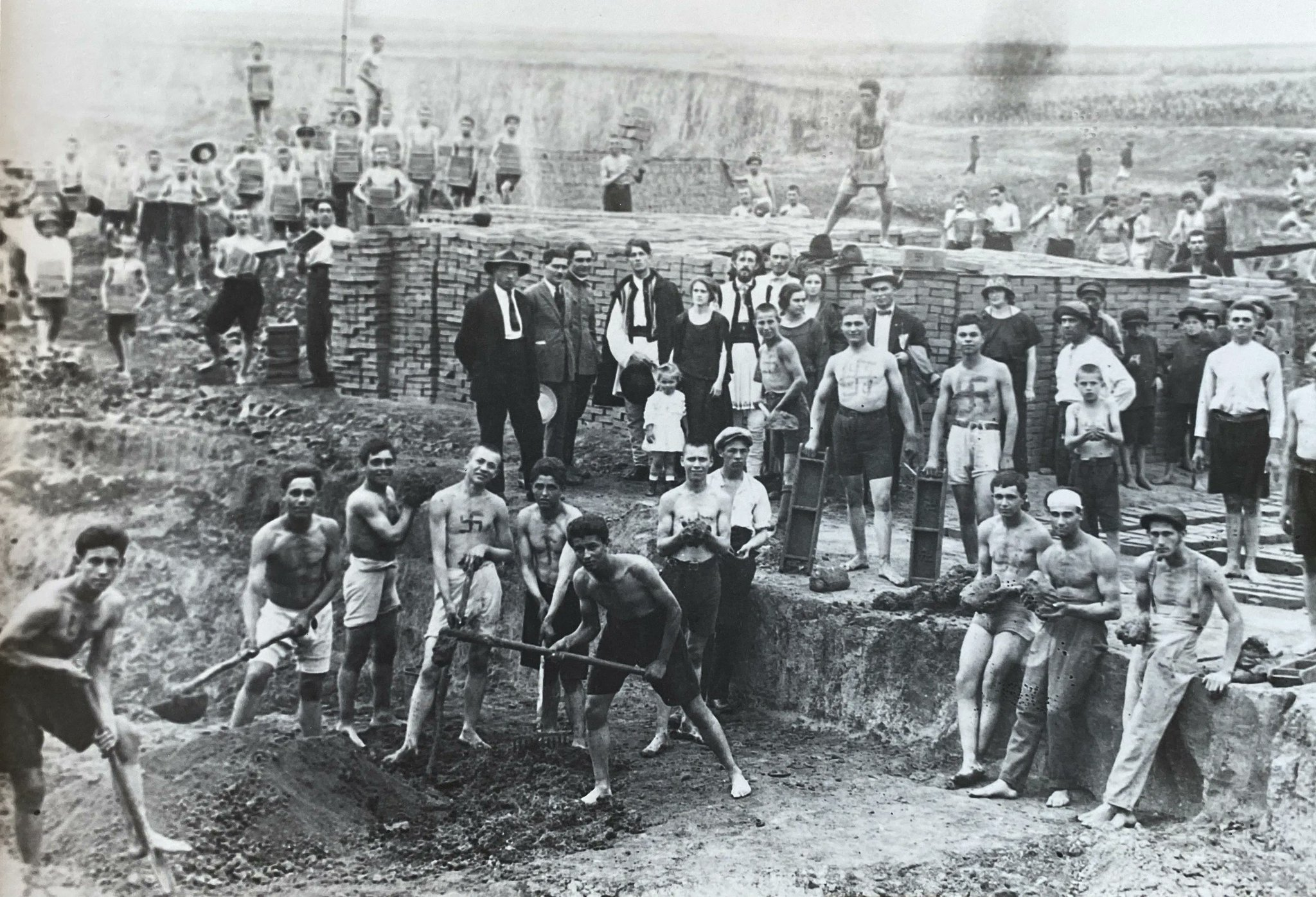
Cuzist students working on a bricklaying project for the building of the Christian Cultural Center, as part of their summer camp activities of the LANC Youth organization, 1924. C. Z. Codreanu can be seen in the back.

The duties of LANC youth members were structured around the academic calendar. During the school year, the focus was on education and moral development. Vacations, however, were seen as a period of activism, when members were encouraged to become “apostles and propagators of the national-Cuzist doctrine.” They were expected to spread the ideas of the League within their families, among acquaintances and strangers alike, striving to establish as many brotherhoods as possible and recruit new members.

For a brief period, between 1923 and 1926, Corneliu Zelea Codreanu was tasked with organizing the LANC youth. He intended to name this youth organization “The Archangel Michael”, although the reasons this name was ultimately not adopted remain unclear.

== Ideology ==
=== Cuzism ===
Cuzism refers to the nationalist-Christian doctrine developed and promoted by A. C. Cuza within the National-Christian Defense League (LANC). It was based on Cuza's political and social writings and ideas.

The term Cuzism came into use as a way to distinguish the League's doctrine, which had initially been associated solely with the term antisemitism. Cuza considered this label both inadequate and misleading. He argued, on the one hand, that the term Semite was incorrect in an ethnic sense – claiming that Jews were not truly Semitic – and on the other hand, that antisemitism, in its general form, was vague and ill-defined. In the context of 1920s Romania, antisemitism had become almost synonymous with nationalism.

=== Antisemitism ===
Cuzism was referred to as the "antisemitism of immediate action," as it advocated for swift and radical measures to resolve the so-called "Jewish question" – whether through legal or violent means. In contrast, general antisemitism was seen as "a slow illness," due to its lack of systematization, unlike the structured doctrine of LANC. Radical and organized antisemitism thus became the core element of LANC's doctrine. Among the measures proposed for addressing the "Jewish question" were: the revocation of political rights for Jews, confiscation of their property, exclusion from public office and the military, halting the naturalization of Jews, and even pressuring them to leave the country.

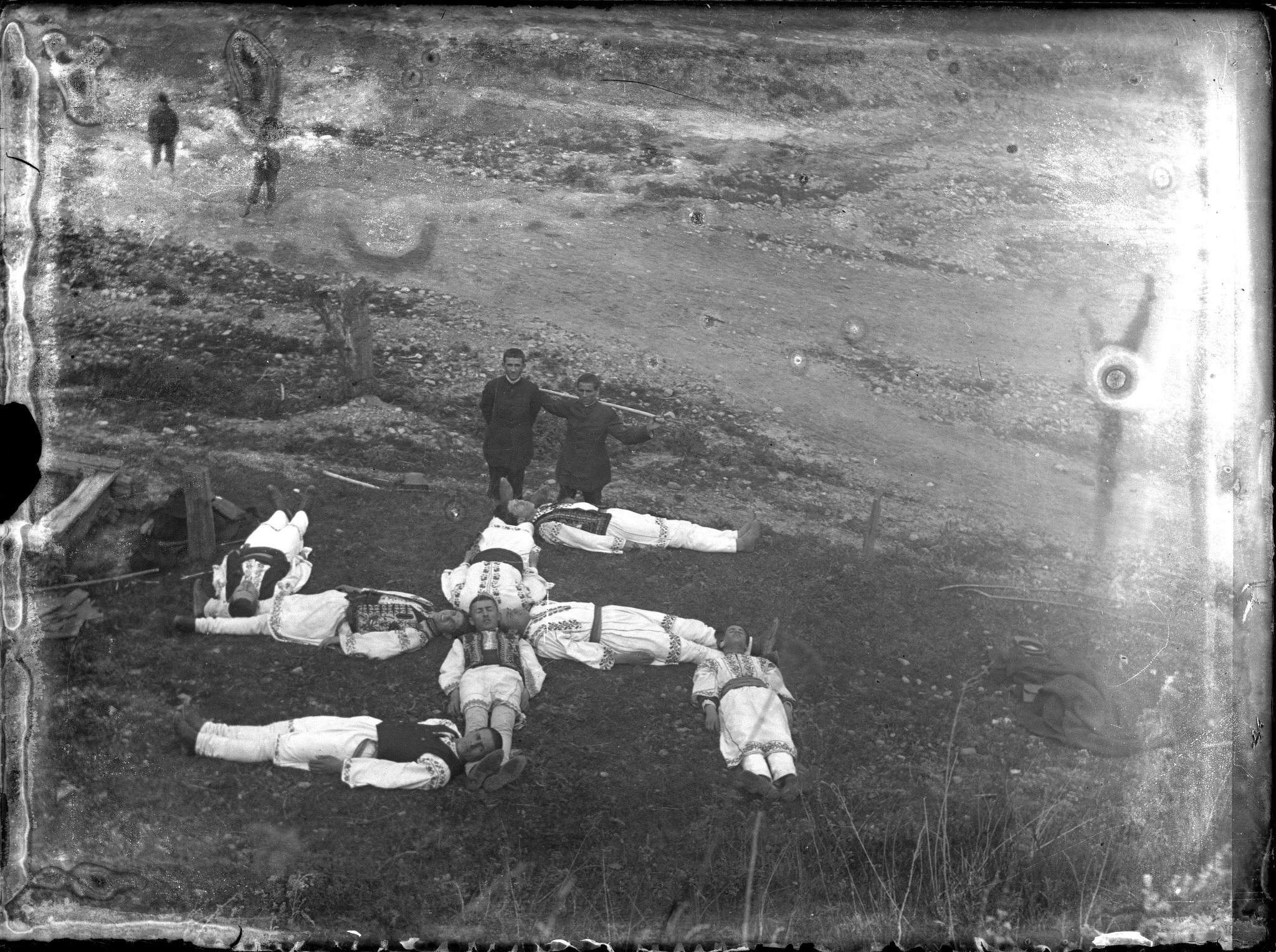
Members or sympathizers of the ultranationalist and antisemitic party National-Christian Defense League forming a swastika cca. 1925–1926

LANC sought to solve the political problems of Romania by first addressing what it regarded as the foundational issue – the "Jewish question" – from which, according to Cuzist doctrine, all other national problems stemmed.

A particular measure advocated by various nationalist and antisemitic groups of the time – including the National Christian Union (UNC), the 1922 antisemitic student movement, the National-Christian Defense League (LANC), the Legion of the Archangel Michael, and the National Christian Party (PNC) – was Numerus Clausus. This measure is described in depth by A. C. Cuza in his book with the same name, Numerus Clausus (1924), as well as by Corneliu Zelea Codreanu in his memoir For My Legionaries (1936).

In the socio-economic context of interwar Romania, Numerus Clausus referred to limiting the number of ethnic minorities (especially Jews) allowed to enter certain economic and cultural sectors, so that their presence would not exceed their proportion within the country's overall population. In the context of the student movement, however, Numerus Clausus specifically referred to restricting the number of ethnic minorities admitted to universities. Similar policies were supported, demanded, and implemented by universities in other European countries as well.

==== The biological dimension of Cuzist antisemitism ====
Under the influence of Nicolae Paulescu, LANC's antisemitism took on a biological dimension, in which the fear of revolution was intertwined with the notion of national decay, imagined as an organism infested by parasites. Jews were depicted as a parasitic threat undermining Romania, contributing to the moral and material degradation of the nation through elements such as socialism, bolshevism, and freemasonry. Paulescu also used biology to extract philosophical laws concerning "social instincts" and "human conflicts," in an attempt to demonstrate that Christian morality is grounded in ethical principles rooted in human nature.

=== Religious antisemitism ===
Nicolae Paulescu was particularly concerned with the religious dimensions of the so-called "Jewish question", while A. C. Cuza focused on its economic dimension, specifically targeting the perceived role of Jews within it. A. C. Cuza would later develop his own form of religious antisemitism, aligning himself with Nicolae Paulescu's position, according to which the Old Testament did not contain the essence of Christianity and was instead the work of a vengeful God, disconnected from Christian divinity.

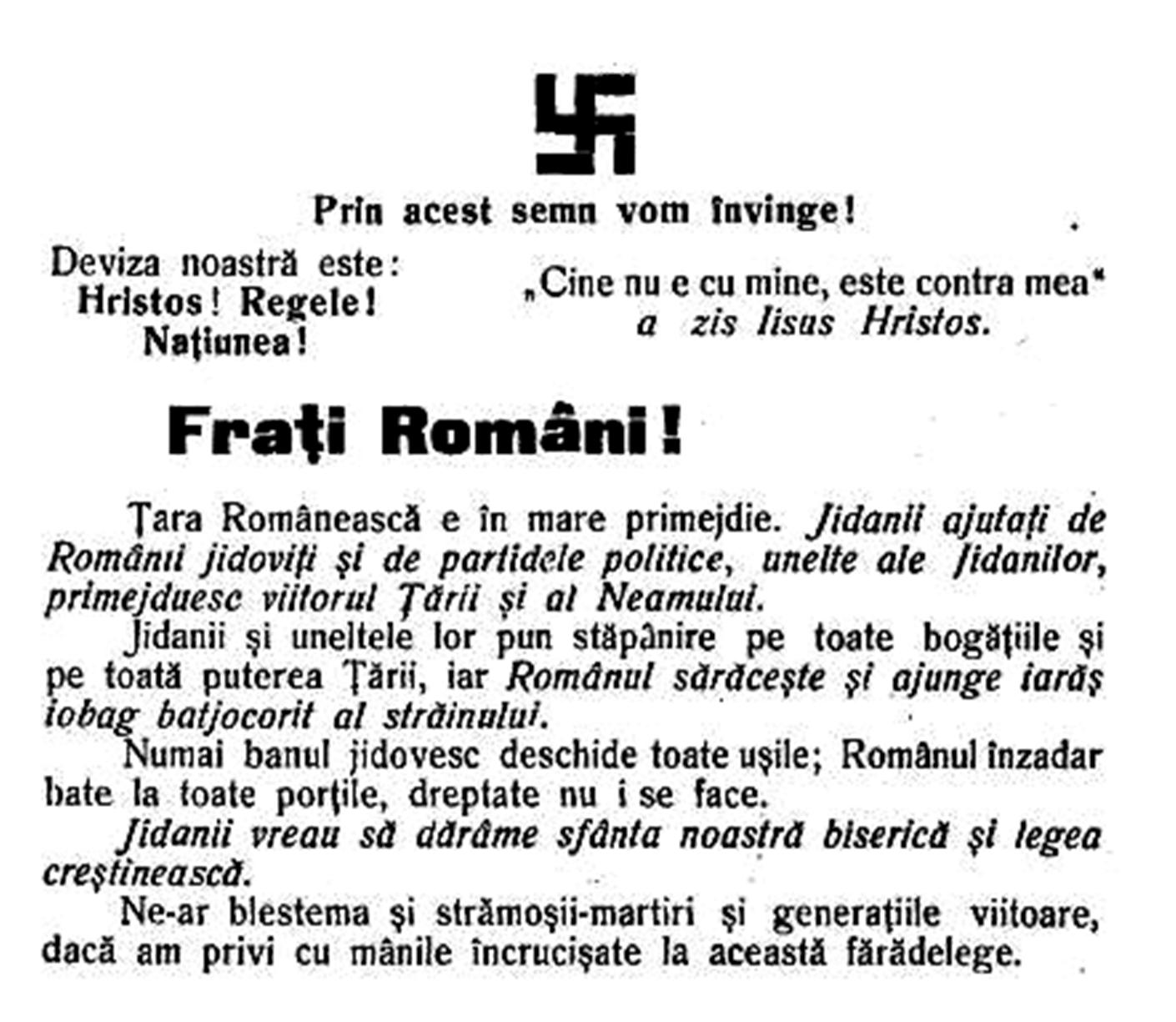
Electoral advertisement for the antisemitic LANC party and its leader, A. C. Cuza. The group's swastika logo at the top, with the slogan Prin acest semn vom învinge! ("In this sign we will conquer!", cf. In hoc signo vinces).

LANC activists loyal to the Romanian Orthodox Church opposed A. C. Cuza's blasphemous theology, particularly his views on the Old Testament. Even some of the League's leaders opposed these ideas, as evidenced during a leadership meeting held at A. C. Cuza's residence. The participants concluded that Cuza's theories deviated from the doctrinal line of the party.

An ideological cornerstone for both the religious antisemitism and the broader religious vision of LANC was Nicolae Paulescu's popular work Spitalul, Coranul, Talmudul, Cahalul și Francmasoneria (English: The Hospital, the Quran, the Talmud, the Kahal, and Freemasonry) (1913): "[...] the Jews, who have inherited the Pharisaic teachings – passed down through the Talmud – dare to strangle the divine religion, just as their ancestors, some 2,000 years ago, had the unheard-of audacity to crucify God Himself."

==== Relationship with the Church ====
A. C. Cuza and Nicolae Paulescu ultimately failed to convince LANC supporters to fully embrace religious antisemitism and the rejection of the Old Testament. Attempts were made to attract Orthodox clergy to the movement, but this effort backfired when the Patriarch of the Romanian Orthodox Church read Cuza's pamphlets, which claimed that Orthodoxy had been "Judaized." In response, the Patriarch distributed his own brochures warning priests not to align themselves with the League. LANC managed to gain clerical support for the first time in the early 1930s, when various theologians – such as Ioan Gheorghe Savin and Metropolitan Irineu Mihălcescu – began encouraging their colleagues and students to support the League. Nevertheless, LANC's relationship with the Church was never as close as that of the Legionary Movement, which successfully managed to intertwine religion with ultranationalism.

=== Corporatism ===
According to the Cuzist doctrine, society should be structured into three main classes:

- The producing class (Romanian: clasa producătoare): Composed primarily of the peasantry, who provided the raw materials necessary for production.
- The middle class: (Romanian: clasa mijlocitoare): Made up of craftsmen, industrialists, and merchants. This class processed the raw materials supplied by the peasants to produce goods and sell them.
- The ruling class (Romanian: clasa conducătoare): Includes priests, technicians, engineers, doctors, military officers, lawyers, professors, etc. Its purpose was to guide the other classes toward a better life and to legislate for the benefit of society.

The doctrine proposed an analogy likening social classes to the organs of a living organism, emphasizing that, just like an organism, these classes must cooperate harmoniously for the good functioning of the whole society. In this structure, the state was portrayed as a mediator between the three social classes, with its primary role being to maintain harmony and ensure that the interests of each class were respected and fulfilled.

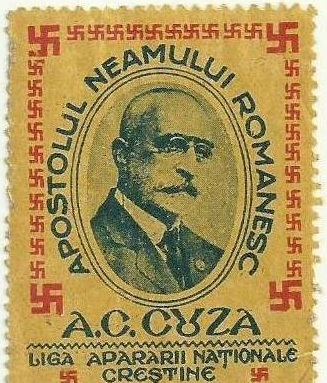
LANC stamp featuring the portrait of A. C. Cuza – “The Apostle of the Romanian Nation”

=== Cuzist perspective on political parties ===
A. C. Cuza sought to rebrand and euphemize the image of the League, aiming to distinguish it from the multitude of traditional political parties. He portrayed the LANC not merely as a political party, but as a "fighting fellowship" or a "brotherhood". This rhetorical strategy stemmed from his belief that traditional parties were tools for the "enemy" of the Romanian people – the Jews. According to Cuza, these parties were allegedly funded through Jewish subsidies and therefore served Jewish interests rather than those of ethnic Romanians.

"This fraternal fellowship is, therefore, a 'League' and not a 'party'. Because in the 'League' any Christian may enter, as long as they commit to fighting against the Jews. The 'League' does not accept anyone who is associated with Jews. Whereas the 'parties' accept not only those who side with the Jews, but also the Jews themselves."

This idea – of elevating the organization above the status of a mere political party – appears to have been adopted and further developed by Corneliu Zelea Codreanu within the Legion of the Archangel Michael:

"The Legionary Movement, before being a political, theoretical, financial, economic, or formula-based movement, is a spiritual school in which, if a man enters, he must come out the other end a hero." – Corneliu Zelea Codreanu (1933) The Nest Leader's Manual

Notable figures of LANC
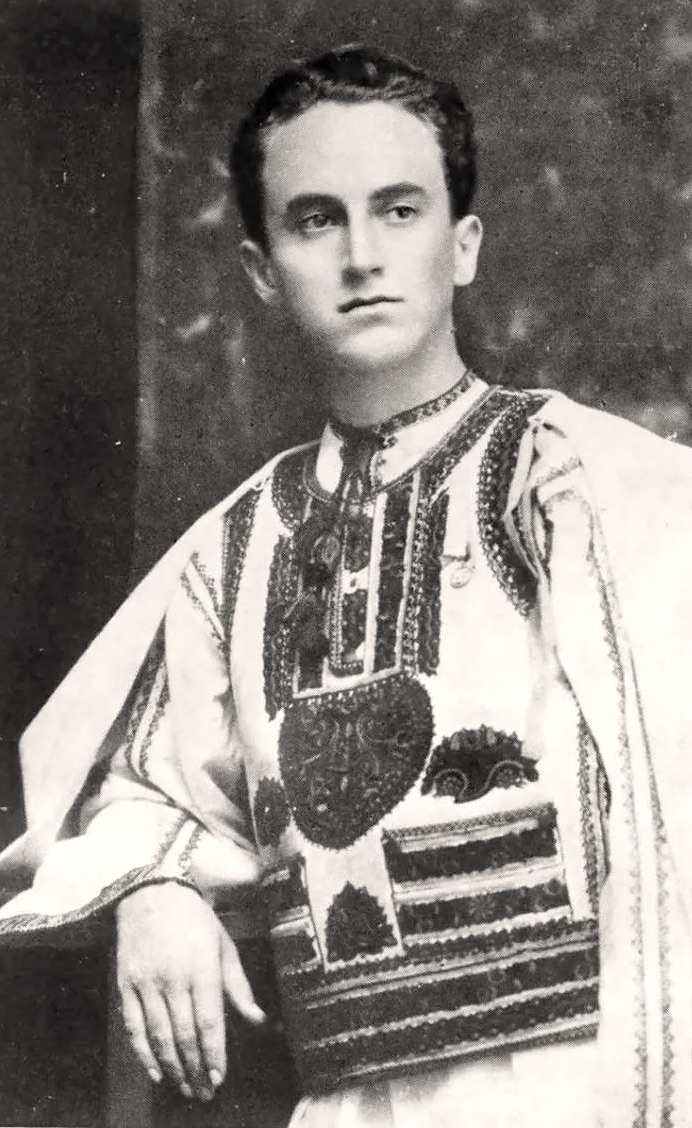
Ion Moța in 1937

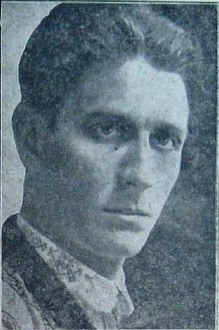
Corneliu Zelea Codreanu in 1927

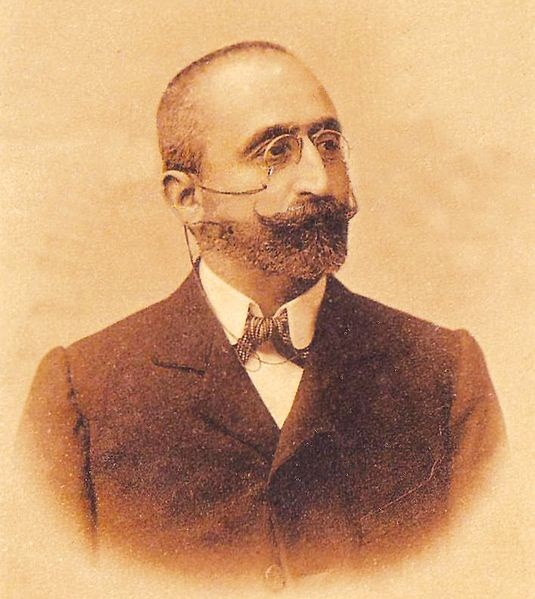
A.C. Cuza, ca. 1900

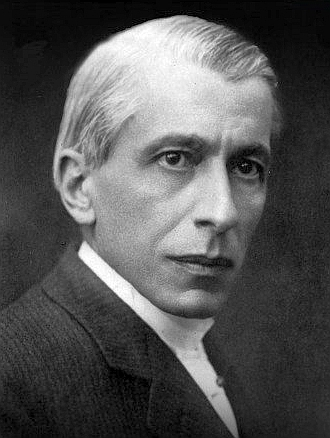
Nicolae Paulescu in 1910

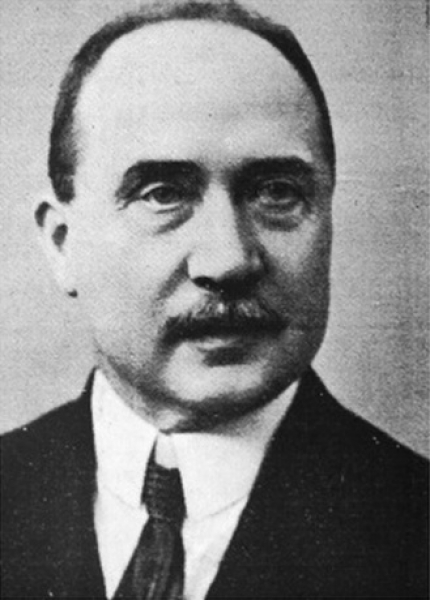
Corneliu Șumuleanu ca. 1930

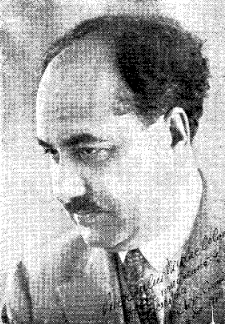
Nichifor Crainic in 1935

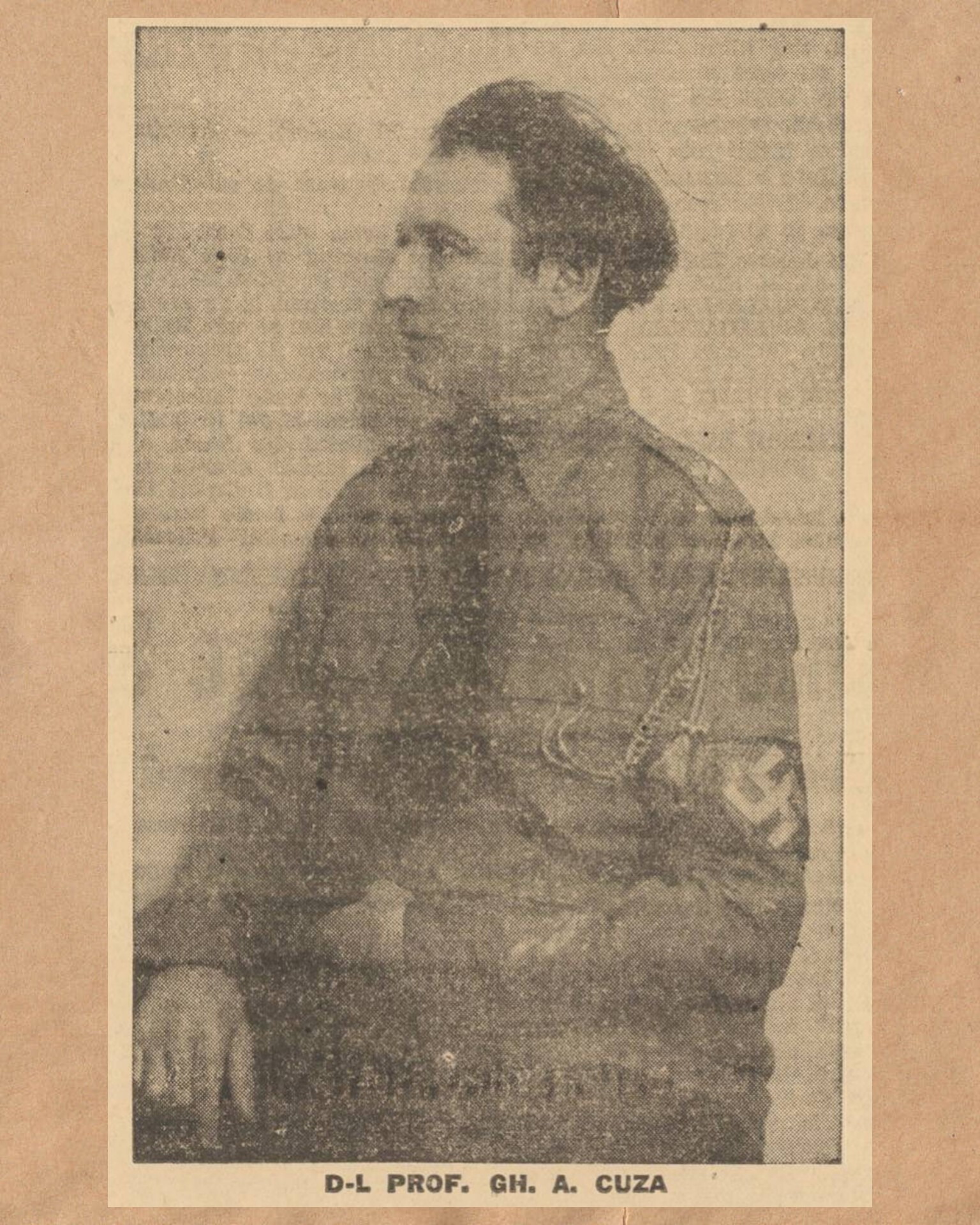
Gheorghe A. Cuza ca. 1935–1938

== Decline ==
=== The deterioration of the relationship between the Codreanu Family and A. C. Cuza ===
Ever since the formation of LANC, Corneliu Zelea Codreanu was tasked with organizing the League throughout the entire country, giving him the opportunity to put his ideas into practice. Codreanu proved to be very eager to become a true leader of the League, thus coming into conflict with A. C. Cuza, who also wanted to assert himself as the undisputed leader of the organization. The conflict between A. C. Cuza and the Codreanu family most likely existed as early as 1925 but became public only at the beginning of 1926. Ultimately, at the core of this conflict was the struggle for power over the leadership of LANC.

In order to avoid a split within the League and to temper Corneliu Zelea Codreanu's zeal, Cuza, instead of removing him from the organization, used the pretext of sending him to France in 1925, supposedly for the purpose of advancing his legal studies. There is also the possibility that C. Zelea Codreanu's departure to France was related to his mental health, as he was likely more deeply affected by the assassination he had committed (the shooting of Constantin Manciu) than is generally acknowledged. It seems he needed time to recover.

However, his stay in France did not temper his behavior – in letters sent to Cuza between December 1925 and February 1926, Codreanu continued to advocate for the introduction of a "discipline of fear" within the League's organizational structure. Ion Moța, a close associate of Codreanu and future ideologue of the Legionary Movement, speaks about the organizational system of LANC proposed by Codreanu, but rejected by A. C. Cuza:

"The quasi-military discipline demanded by Corneliu Zelea Codreanu (who was in charge of organizing LANC) as the cohesive force of the organization and the guarantee of its success was systematically rejected – with the inevitable doses of humor – by our elderly professor. Corneliu Codreanu had to yield, not without respectfully expressed bitterness, which nonetheless began to poison the relationship between him and the professor-president Cuza." – The Axis newspaper article called "The Legion and LANC" from October 1, 1933, via Cranii de lemn (1940)

Codreanu returned to the country for the 1926 elections (from March to May), even though Cuza had not asked him to do so. Cuza made him feel this clearly. Codreanu and other members of LANC's youth wing were not included on the electoral lists, which stirred resentment among them toward the "elders" of the League and its leadership.

=== The split & A. C. Cuza's authoritarian leadership ===
On August 8, 1926, Noua Generație (English: "The New Generation") – a youth faction of LANC led by Tudose Popescu – gathered at Putna Monastery for a students' meeting. The students in this group rose up against various old-guard members of LANC, rejecting A. C. Cuza's pretension to be the undisputed leader of the organization. Later that month, on August 18, A. C. Cuza summoned the Grand Council of LANC, during which supporters of the two Codreanus (Corneliu Zelea Codreanu and his father, Ion Zelea Codreanu) demanded the creation of a leadership committee to replace Cuza's absolute rule over the League. They also requested the appointment of C. Zelea Codreanu as secretary general and greater transparency in decision-making. A. C. Cuza's authoritarianism faced strong criticism. Behind the two Codreanus, during these internal power struggles, a number of key figures rallied – personalities who would later play essential roles in the future Legionary Movement.

In March 1927, Tudose Popescu, together with Ioan Istrate, was arrested in Bucharest under suspicion of a fascist conspiracy. The two were allegedly planning to break away from LANC and redirect the League's youth wing toward the faction led by C. Zelea Codreanu. In the same year, Ion Zelea Codreanu and A. C. Cuza entered into conflict over the selection of candidates for the December 1927 elections.

On 15-16 October, 1927, the Grand Council of LANC was summoned once again. A. C. Cuza dismissed deputy Paul Iliescu, accusing him of opposing the student movement, misusing LANC's funds for personal purposes, and attempting to seize control of the League. Cuza made this decision without consulting the rest of the LANC leadership, which triggered dissatisfaction from five out of the remaining nine deputies, led by Ion Zelea Codreanu and Corneliu Șumuleanu (In 1927, LANC had ten deputies in total, including Cuza himself). In response to their protest, Cuza dismissed those five deputies as well, accusing them of forming an alliance with Jews and of attempting to turn the League into a political party. In the end, seven of the ten deputies were dismissed. Those excluded formed a breakaway group called LANC-Statutar (English: Statutory LANC), referring to Cuza's violation of the League's statute. Among the "statutories" were: Traian Brăileanu, Tița Mălaiu, Gheorghe Rusu, Ioan Moța (father of Ion I. Moța), P. Bălan, Hristache Solomon, and D. Popescu-Bârlad. Students loyal to Cuza and his supporters were labeled by the breakaway group as LANC-Nestatutar ("Non-statutory LANC").

Beginning in 1928, negotiations were held to reunify the League, with the reconciliation process continuing through 1929 and the following years. By the early 1930s, LANC had managed to stabilize itself. However, the conflict with the Legion of the Archangel Michael would only intensify.

==== The generational gap ====
The youth within LANC held a different view regarding the means of action, preferring to maintain their autonomy from the organization's Central Committee. The acts of violence and hooliganism committed by students during the trial of Nicolae Totu in February 1927 were criticized by Paul Iliescu and Ion Zelea Codreanu, who condemned them for their lack of self-control. Although A. C. Cuza advocated violence in rhetoric, the League remained loyal to the state – a stance that clashed with the students who were willing to resort to actual physical violence.

In the article "Legiunea și L.A.N.C." (English: "The Legion and LANC"), written by Ion Moța for the newspaper Axa on October 1, 1933, the author suggests that neither the elders of the League nor the youth deliberately sought to distance themselves from one another. This separation occurred naturally, due to differences in how they approached the "antisemitic struggle" and, because of the generational gap.

"The 'student conspiracy' of the autumn of 1923, the first manifestation of 'our great rupture' from the estranged old world, thus placed us at a great distance from our professors and nationalist parents – so deeply and dearly loved – who, in the initial phase of the events, all recoiled from the gesture ... which they did not understand." – Axa, October 1, 1933, via Cranii de lemn (1940)

In regard to the 1923 conspiracy, A. C. Cuza reportedly said to C. Zelea Codreanu: "Do you think that just because you fired a pistol, you've accomplished something great?"

=== Legion of the Archangel Michael ===
Corneliu Zelea Codreanu and Ion Moța, still studying in France in February 1927, learned about the internal crisis within LANC. At Ion Moța's request, they returned to Romania on May 24, 1927. On their way back, they met with Tudose Popescu and Ion Sârbu, who provided them with more detailed information about the conflict within LANC. Upon returning, C. Zelea Codreanu acted promptly, attempting to reunify LANC in order to assert himself as the leader of a unified League. However, his efforts proved to be in vain. Together with his longtime collaborators and supporters – those with whom he had laid the foundations of the 1923 conspiracy – Codreanu now stood on the verge of founding a new organization, accusing the older generation of having destroyed LANC through scandals driven by personal interests.

"Today, Friday, June 24, 1927 (The feast of St. John the Baptist), at 10 o'clock in the evening, is founded under my leadership, 'The Legion of Michael the Archangel. Let anyone who believes without reservation, join our ranks. Let him who has doubts remain on the sidelines. I hereby nominate Radu Mironovici as leader of the guard of the icon." – Corneliu Zelea Codreanu, For My Legionaries

C. Zelea Codreanu managed to attract only about 20 students to the new movement, but within just a few years, it would become the main rival of LANC and, at the same time, the most notorious far-right movement in interwar Romania, surpassing LANC significantly in terms of numbers, doctrine, and organization.

On July 25, C. Zelea Codreanu, along with other close collaborators, bid farewell to A. C. Cuza, asking him to release them from the oaths they had sworn. A significant number of former leaders and prominent figures from LANC joined the newly founded Legion: Gheorghe Clime (vice president of LANC Iași branch), Ioan Blănaru (former president of the Christian Students' Association in Iași), I.C. Cătuneanu (leader of the Romanian Action, Cluj branch), and Mille Lefter (president of LANC, Galați branch). Others shifted their allegiance to different parties, such as the National Liberal Party (Valer Pop) or the National Peasants' Party (Iuliu Hațieganu). Such defections from LANC leadership were indicative of growing disillusionment within the League and enhanced the prestige of the Legion.

== Paramilitary organizations of LANC ==
=== The Lancers between 1923 and 1935 ===
Lăncierii (a name likely derived from the newspaper Lancea, the LANC electoral symbol – a horizontal line – or from the initials of the acronym LANC) referred to various groups of individuals ideologically affiliated with LANC. Their actions varied: at times, they engaged spontaneously in street violence against Jews or political opponents; in other cases, they operated in a semi-organized or fully organized manner, conducting marches and propaganda demonstrations. The term was used both to describe paramilitary formations and, more broadly, as a nickname for LANC members participating in certain public events, regardless of their rank or function within the organization. Beginning in 1933, the Lăncierii were formally organized into assault battalions.

Following the 1935 merger between LANC and the National Agrarian Party, which resulted in the formation of the National Christian Party, the Lăncierii became an official paramilitary wing of the new party, with designated control structures and a more formalized organization than in the period from 1923 to 1935.

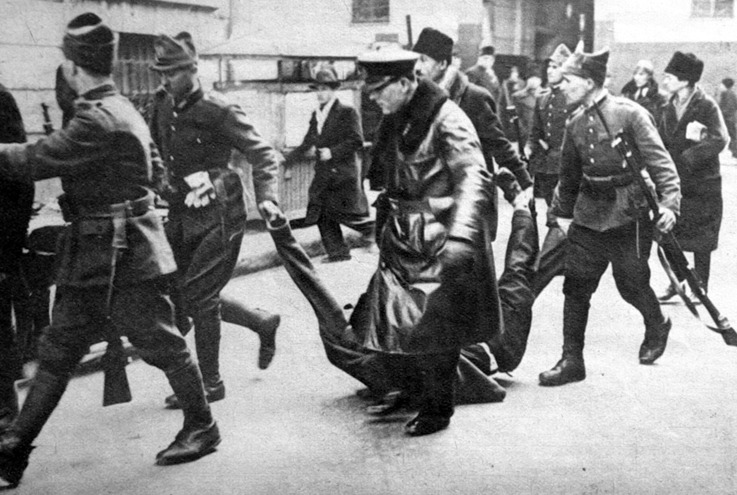
Bucharest, March 1, 1936. Clashes between members of the National Christian Party and those of the National Peasants' Party. The individual being detained is a National Christian Party lancer.

==== Instrumentalization and integration of the Archers' organizations into LANC ====
Initially, the Archers of Bukovina were nationalist student and youth groups with a predominantly cultural character. However, as LANC grew in popularity, these groups began to be infiltrated and instrumentalized by the Cuzists, gradually transforming into political organizations with a paramilitary role. By 1928, 12 of the 55 Archer groups in Bukovina were already affiliated with LANC, while the rest remained under the leadership of folklorist Valerian Dugan-Opaiț, who advocated for preserving the Archers' apolitical nature. Corneliu Zelea Codreanu recalls in For My Legionaries how the Archers provided security for the LANC congress held in Câmpulung on September 17, 1923:

"We held it only after a tough battle, because the government had forbidden it, and to enforce its edict sent in troops from Cernăuți under the command of a colonel. Strong troop cordons were set up at each entrance to the town. We concentrated all our forces at the west entrance into town, from Sadova, Pojorata. There we broke cordons, thanks to the archers from Vatra-Dornei and Candreni, giving us a whole hour to get the entire convoy of several hundred wagons through."

==== The uniforms ====
"The required uniform consisted of a blue beret in Moldova, a hat or fur cap in Bukovina, accompanied by a blue shirt, black tie, brown trousers with puttees, a belt with a diagonal strap and boots."

=== Formation of the Assault Battalions ===
After Adolf Hitler's rise to power in Germany in early 1933, A. C. Cuza personally congratulated him in a letter. Shortly thereafter, in March 1933, the Lăncieri were officially organized and centralized as the paramilitary force of LANC. The LANC's Assault Battalions – also known as the Blue Shirts – were modeled after the Nazi Sturmabteilung (SA) and became notorious for committing severe acts of antisemitic violence. Authorities often confused the guardists with the Cuzists, and violent acts committed by either group were frequently misattributed. That same year, the Iron Guard also strengthened its own assault battalions, whose members wore green shirts introduced by Mihai Stelescu. From 1933 onwards, clashes between members of the Legionary Movement and the Cuzists became increasingly frequent, although their rivalry dated back to 1927, when the Legion of the Archangel Michael split from LANC. In Pentru legionari (For My Legionaries, 1936), Corneliu Zelea Codreanu recalled that moment:

"Our birth was greeted with a hurricane of hate and ridicule. The two camps of the League-Cuzists and Statutories-broke relations with us. All students in Iași left us and the attacks of the Cuzists up to now directed at the Statutories were from now on to be aimed at us, piercing like arrows into our hearts."

=== The Steel Guards (National Guards) ===
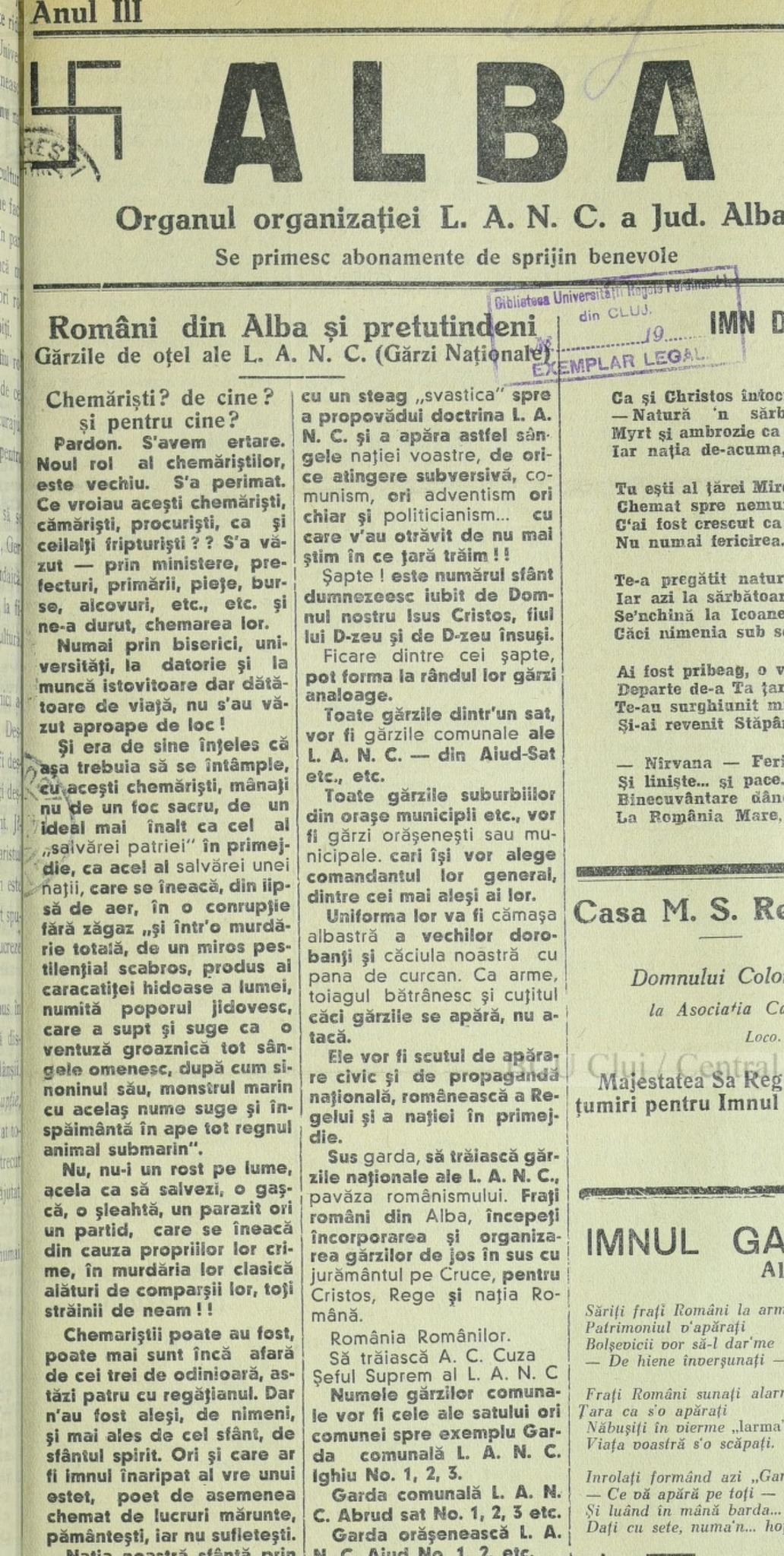
Alba, a LANC newspaper ca. 1928–1930, discussing Steel Guards, paramilitary units of LANC.

In an article published in the newspaper Alba, the official publication of LANC's Alba County branch, Romanians in Alba and other regions were encouraged to organize Steel Guards (also referred to as National Guards). The village-based units were to form communal guards, while those in the suburbs and cities were to form urban or municipal guards, each led by a general commander. The declared purpose of these units was to serve as a "shield of civic defense and national Romanian propaganda for the King and the nation in danger."

The Steel Guard uniform drew inspiration from Romanian military tradition and included the blue shirt of the old dorobanți (infantrymen) and a fur cap adorned with a turkey feather and its weaponry included staffs and knives.

This name – Steel Guards – also appears to have served as an inspiration for Corneliu Zelea Codreanu, who would name the paramilitary wing of the Legionary Movement the Iron Guard, founded in 1930. It is also possible that Codreanu drew inspiration from the German paramilitary veterans' organization Der Stahlhelm ("The Steel Helmet"), which he may have encountered during his visits to Germany.

== The rivalry with the Legion of the Archangel Michael and the attempts at reconciliation ==
Discussions took place between LANC and LAM regarding a possible merger; however, meetings between the two groups' leaders, A. C. Cuza and C. Zelea Codreanu, were ultimately unsuccessful due to their unwillingness to compromise on the leadership and structure of a unified organization. Codreanu's final proposal was that the cuzists should join the Iron Guard as individual members.

In October 1930, Donca-Manea, LANC leader in eastern Muntenia, accused Codreanu of attacking LANC under the influence of A. Vaida-Voevod and disregarding a ceasefire, despite popular support for a merger between the two movements. In June 1931, Professor Petre Stati facilitated a meeting in Iași between Codreanu and a LANC delegation led by Rudolf Suțu. Codreanu demanded that the new movement adopt the Legionary spirit and a military-style organization, conditions that implied the subordination of A. C. Cuza.

In September 1931, Donca-Manea attempted to broker an agreement between A. C. Cuza and Codreanu, but the effort failed. At the end of October 1931, priest Georgescu-Edineț mediated yet another reconciliation attempt. Finally, in July 1933, in Iași, Gheorghe A. Cuza proposed that his father, A. C. Cuza, lead the merged movement (between LAM and LANC), that he himself become secretary general, and that Codreanu command an assault battalion. Codreanu vehemently rejected the proposal, accusing Gheorghe A. Cuza of frequenting Masonic lodges while he (Codreanu) was imprisoned. Thus, political hatred and violence between the two groups persisted even after LANC transformed into the PNC. After 1935, the conflict and rivalry between the PNC and the Legionary Movement reached their peak.

== Merger ==
=== The National Christian Party ===
The LANC managed to regroup and returned to the Chamber of Deputies at the December 1933 general election, winning nine seats, two fewer than at the 1932 election. The LANC had begun falling behind the Legionary Movement and it soon became clear that it needed to expand if it hoped to have any power. As such, Nichifor Crainic took the lead in organizing negotiations with Octavian Goga and his equally right-wing, anti-Semitic National Agrarian Party (which also won 9 seats in 1933). LANC merged on July 14, 1935, in Iași, with the National Agrarian Party led by Octavian Goga, forming the National Christian Party (PNC). The party was led under a dual presidency: A. C. Cuza as supreme president and Octavian Goga as active president.

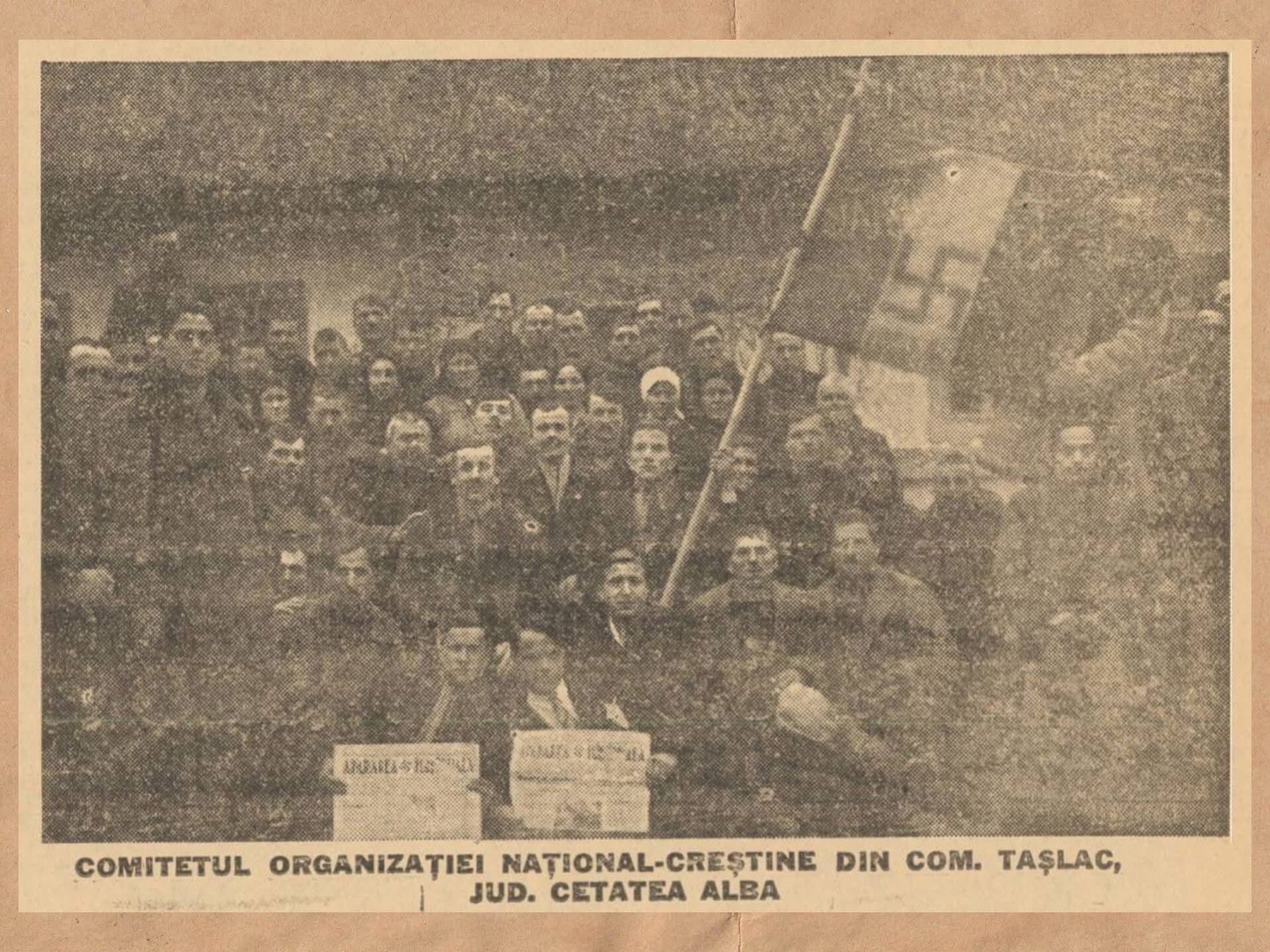
National Christian Party (PNC) supporters holding the party's regional branch flag and newspaper "Apărarea Națională" / "National Defense" ca. 1935–1938

The party emerged due to internal considerations regarding the Romanian state as well – particularly the political maneuvers of King Carol II – as well as external ones, linked to the geopolitical ambitions of Nazi Germany and the Soviet Union, both of which sought to destabilize Romanian political life through subversive and agitational activities. King Carol II supported the founding of the National Christian Party both as a counterbalance to the Legionary Movement, the Brătianu Liberals, and the National Peasants' Party – all of which opposed the king's authoritarian attitude – and to draw closer to Nazi Germany, at the time an increasingly dominant power in Europe.

At the 1937 election, the National Christian Party achieved 39 of the 387 seats in the Chamber of Deputies compared to 66 seats won by the Legionary Movement's Everything for the Country Party. Nevertheless, Octavian Goga was chosen in December 1937 by King Carol II to form a government.

The Cuza-Goga government was formed on 29 December 1937 but lasted for only 44 days. However, it wasn't slow in starting to implement its antisemitic program. It repudiated Romania's obligations under the Minorities Treaty imposed upon it at the 1919 Paris Peace Conference, and then stripped 250,000 Romanian Jews of Romanian citizenship, one third of the Romanian Jewish population. Jewish businesses were also closed down. The governance of the National Christian Party ultimately served as a transitional bridge to King Carol II's monarchical dictatorship, which was established after the adoption of the 1938 constitution.

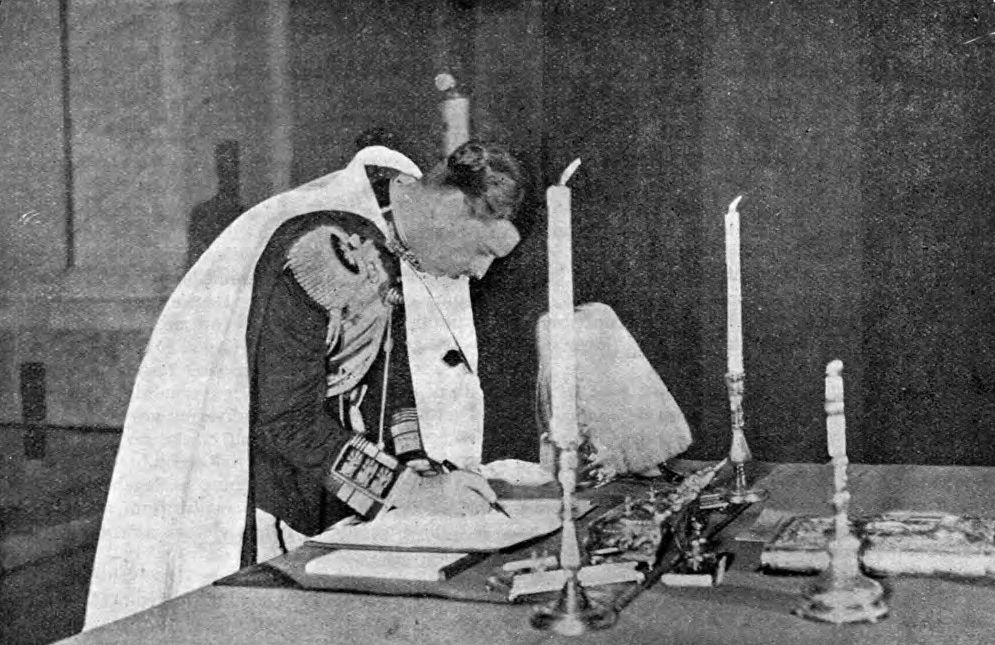
King Carol II signing the constitution on February 27, 1938.

==== The ties of the Goga-Cuzists with Nazi Germany ====
The National Christian Party was thus heavily supported by the Amt Rosenberg (Rosenberg Office) of the NSDAP (National Socialist German Workers’ Party). For Alfred Rosenberg, it was essential that the issue of Romanian fascist and national-socialist-oriented parties be resolved in favor of Nazi Germany.

Gheorghe A. Cuza, the son of A. C. Cuza and Secretary General of the National Christian Party, visited Nazi Germany on multiple occasions to meet with Adolf Hitler in hopes of securing his support. Such visits also took place in 1933–1934, when LANC was still an independent organization. Gheorghe A. Cuza had been sent by his father to lead a LANC delegation to Germany and Austria in order to establish ties with leading figures of the NSDAP, from whom he reportedly received financial subsidies. It is well known that A. C. Cuza himself expressed sympathy toward Adolf Hitler and his ideology:

"I no longer hide the fact that all my sympathies lie with Hitler's movement in Germany, which I believe will succeed and bring about a profound transformation in the relations between nations, and will restore Aryan and Christian culture against the international Jewish domination." – A. C. Cuza, in a speech from December 10, 1931.

Octavian Goga also held a series of meetings with both Adolf Hitler and Benito Mussolini in order to "learn how to govern in an authoritarian manner." One such meeting took place in 1936. The international press at the time reported:

"GOGA, RUMANIAN NAZI CHIEF, RETURNS FROM BERLIN TRIP

BUCHAREST, Aug. 30. (JTA) – Returning from Berlin, Prof. Octavius Goga, notorious Rumanian anti-Semitic leader, today told newspaper men that the task of his Rumanian National Christian Party was to fight bolshevism and Jewry.

Prof. Goga reported he had received the most favorable impression of the Third Reich."

– Jewish Telegraphic Agency, Vol. II. No. 26 from August 31, 1936.

== Electoral history ==
=== Legislative elections ===
Election	Votes	%	Assembly	Senate	Position
1926	124,778	4.9%	10 / 387	0 / 115	4th
1927	52,481	1.9%	0 / 387	0 / 110	5th
1928	32,273	1.2%	0 / 387	0 / 110	7th
1931	113,863	4.0%	8 / 387	0 / 113	6th
1932	159,071	5.5%	11 / 387	2 / 113	5th
1933	133,205	4.6%	9 / 387	0 / 108	5th

== Bibliography ==
- Ciucanu, C. (2010). A. C. Cuza și mișcările studențești din anii 1922–1923. Constituirea și activitatea Ligii Apărării Național-Creștine (1923–1930). Cercetări Istorice, XXIV–XXVI, 324–325. [A. C. Cuza and the student movements of 1922–1923: The formation and activity of the National-Christian Defense League (1923–1930). Historical Research, 24–26, 324–325.]
- Clark, R. (2015) (Cited edition 2024). Sfânta tinerețe legionară. Activismul fascist în România interbelică (ediția a II-a revăzută și adăugită). [Holy Legionary Youth: Fascist Activism in Interwar Romania] Editura Polirom. ISBN 978-973-46-9830-1
- Codreanu, C. Z. (1933) (Cited edition 2022). Cărticica șefului de cuib. [The nest's leader manual]. Editura Sânziana. ISBN 978-606-8747-19-4
- Codreanu, C. Z. (1936) (Cited edition 2024). Pentru legionari. [For my legionaries]. Editura Sânziana. ISBN 978-606-8747-27-9
- Mezărescu, I. (2018). Partidul Național Creștin 1935–1938. [The National-Christian Party 1935-1938]. Editura Paideia. ISBN 978-606-748-256-0
- Moța, I. (1940) (Cited edition 2021). Cranii de lemn. [Wooden skulls]. Editura Vicovia & Editura Babel. ISBN 978-973-7888-28-0
- Pintescu, F., Dănilă, I., Dieaconu, D., Chelaru, M., & Zelinski, O. (2020). Analele Liceului „Vasile Conta” Târgu-Neamț. Seria Istorie, Vol. II Nr. 1 [Annals of the "Vasile Conta" High School, Târgu-Neamț – History Series, Vol. II, No. 1]. Editura PIM. ISSN 2668-6317
- Schmitt, O. J. (2017) (Cited edition 2022). Corneliu Zelea Codreanu: Ascensiunea și căderea Căpitanului. [Corneliu Zelea Codreanu: The Rise and Fall of the “Captain”]. Editura Humanitas. ISBN 978-973-50-7541-5
