= Sergeyeva =

Sergeyeva, Sergeeva or Sergejeva (Russian: Сергеева) is a common Russian female surname, which may refer to

- Ella Sergeyeva (1935–2024), Soviet rower
- Galina Sergeyeva (1914–2000), Russian actress
- Irina Sergeyeva (born 1968), Russian sprint athlete and Olympic gold medallist in hurdling
- Maria Sergeyeva, Russian political activist
- Maria Sergeyeva (born 1983), Kazakhstani chess grandmaster
- Maria Sergejeva (born 1992), Estonian figure skater
- Maria Sergeeva (born 2001), Russian rhythmic gymnast
- Natalya Sergeyeva (born 1976), Kazakhstani sprint canoe racer
- Svetlana Sergeeva (born 1986), Russian athlete
- Tatyana Sergeyeva (born 1951), Russian composer
- Elena Sergeeva (born 1980), Russian handball world Champion

== See also ==
- Sergeyev, male variant of Sergeeyva
