= Corneliu Șumuleanu =

Romanian chemist and politician

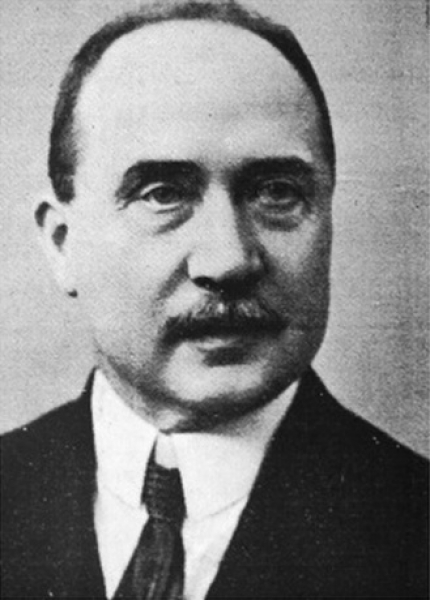
Corneliu Șumuleanu

Corneliu Șumuleanu (November 4, 1869–December 15, 1937) was a Romanian chemist and far-right politician.

== Biography ==
Born in Iași, he attended the city's National College, following which he enrolled in the Faculty of Physical and Chemical Sciences at the University of Iași. There, his professors included Petru Poni and Grigore Cobălcescu. In 1891, he was named assistant to Poni, and he earned his degree in 1894. In 1895, he was hired at the city's recently established food chemistry laboratory, where he showed a talent for organization. In late 1896, he married Clemansa Climescu, a 19-year-old student and the daughter of a university professor. In 1897, Șumuleanu left for the University of Berlin. There, after working in the laboratory of Emil Fischer and Robert Pschorr and distinguishing himself as a student, he earned a doctorate in 1901.

The same year, having returned to Iași, he was named head of the city's chemistry institute, under the Health Ministry. He would remain there for eleven years. Meanwhile, in November 1907, he was named associate professor in the medical chemistry and biology department of the Iași Medical Faculty, and was promoted to full professor in July 1913. Subsequently, he led the department until his death. As director of a medical and biochemical laboratory, Șumuleanu shaped a school of young chemists. His lectures were usually accompanied by demonstrations and were known for their clear and thorough presentation.

His published work focused on organic chemistry. One article that appeared at Berlin in 1901 dealt with the synthesis of dimethylmorpholine and aminoaniline. Together with his assistants, he performed a series of analyses on domestic mineral water, at Bălțătești, Budachi, Covasna and Slănic-Moldova. He also devised several micro-analytic methods applied to Romanian wine.

He became active in politics in 1910, when he joined the Democratic Nationalist Party (PND) founded by Nicolae Iorga and A. C. Cuza. Together with Ion Zelea Codreanu, he belonged to the party's radical nationalist wing. He briefly gained notoriety in 1919, when, as vice president of the Romanian Senate, he read the decrees proclaiming the union of Transylvania, Bukovina and Bessarabia with Romania. When Cuza announced his definitive break with Iorga in March 1920, Șumuleanu followed him into Alexandru Averescu's People's Party. In early 1922, Cuza founded the National Christian Union, together with Nicolae Paulescu, Codreanu and Șumuleanu. This organization evolved into the National-Christian Defense League the following March. Also in 1922, student protests demanding a Jewish quota began at the Iași Medical Faculty; these were inspired by Cuza, Șumuleanu and Ion Găvănescul. He later became a leading member of the Iron Guard, whose leader Corneliu Zelea Codreanu would recall this trio as the only professors at Iași who did not espouse "anti-Romanian ideas". Șumuleanu ran for and won a seat in the Assembly of Deputies in 1937, but died five days before the vote took place.
