= Sergeyevka, Lgovsky District, Kursk Oblast =

Rural locality in Kursk Oblast, Russia

Sergeyevka Сергеевка
- Village
- Interactive map of Sergeyevka
- Location of Sergeyevka Sergeyevka (Kursk Oblast)
- Coordinates: 51°42′03″N 35°11′44″E
- Country: Russia
- Federal subject: Kursk Oblast
- Administrative district: Lgovsky District
- SelsovietSelsoviet: Kudintsevky

Population (2010 Census)
  - Total: 274
  - Estimate (2010): 274 (0%)

Municipal status
  - Municipal district: Lgovsky Municipal District
  - Rural settlement: Kudintsevky Selsoviet Rural Settlement
- Time zone: UTC+3 (MSK)
- Postal code: 307731
- Dialing code: +7 47140
- OKTMO ID: 38622450111
- Website: kudincevo.ru

Sergeyevka (Russian: Сергеевка) is a rural locality (Russian: деревня, lit. 'village') in Kudintsevky Selsoviet Rural Settlement, Lgovsky District, Kursk Oblast, Russia. Population: 274 (2010 census); 321 (2002 census);

== Geography ==
The village is located on the Seym River, 52 km from the Russia–Ukraine border, 69 km west of Kursk, 6.5 km north-west of the district center – the town Lgov, 2 km from the selsoviet center – Kudintsevo.

Climate

Sergeyevka has a warm-summer humid continental climate (Dfb in the Köppen climate classification).

== Transport ==
Sergeyevka is located 40 km from the road of regional importance 38K-038 (Fatezh – Dmitriyev), 16 km from the road 38K-005 (Konyshyovka – Zhigayevo – 38K-038), 5.5 km from the road 38K-023 (Lgov – Konyshyovka), 6.5 km from the road 38K-017 (Kursk – Lgov – Rylsk – border with Ukraine), on the road of intermunicipal significance 38Н-440 (Lgov – Kudintsevo), 3.5 km from the nearest railway station Sherekino (railway line Navlya – Lgov-Kiyevsky).

The rural locality is situated 75 km from Kursk Vostochny Airport, 151 km from Belgorod International Airport and 278 km from Voronezh Peter the Great Airport.
