= Sergeyevka, Ufimsky District, Republic of Bashkortostan =

Sergeyevka Сергеевка
- Village
- Location within Bashkortostan Location within Russia
- Coordinates: 54°42′N 55°44′E
- Country: Russia
- Region: Bashkortostan
- District: Ufimsky District
- Time zone: UTC+5:00

Sergeyevka (Russian: Сергеевка) is a rural locality (a village) in Zhukovsky Selsoviet, Ufimsky District, Bashkortostan, Russia. The population was 490 as of 2010. There are 4 streets.

== Geography ==
Sergeyevka is located 29 km west of Ufa (the district's administrative centre) by road. Demsky Rayon is the nearest rural locality.
