= Serhiivka =

Serhiivka (Ukrainian: Сергіївка) may refer to the following places in Ukraine:

== Chernihiv Oblast ==
- Serhiivka, Chernihiv Oblast

== Donetsk Oblast ==
- Serhiivka, Donetsk Oblast

== Dnipropetrovsk Oblast ==
- Serhiivka, Dnipro Raion, Dnipropetrovsk Oblast
- Serhiivka, Apostolove urban hromada, Kryvyi Rih Raion, Dnipropetrovsk Oblast
- Serhiivka, Devladove rural hromada, Kryvyi Rih Raion, Dnipropetrovsk Oblast
- Serhiivka, Nikopol Raion, Dnipropetrovsk Oblast
- Serhiivka, Pavlohrad Raion, Dnipropetrovsk Oblast

== Khmelnytskyi Oblast ==
- Serhiivka, Khmelnytskyi Oblast

== Kirovohrad Oblast ==
- Serhiivka, Kirovohrad Oblast

== Luhansk Oblast ==
- Serhiivka, Luhansk Oblast

== Odesa Oblast ==
- Serhiivka, Serhiivka settlement hromada, Bilhorod-Dnistrovskyi Raion, Odesa Oblast
- Serhiivka, Kulevcha rural hromada, Bilhorod-Dnistrovskyi Raion, Odesa Oblast
- Serhiivka, Kodyma urban hromada, Podilsk Raion, Odesa Oblast
- Serhiivka, Liubashivka settlement hromada, Podilsk Raion, Odesa Oblast

== Poltava Oblast ==
- Serhiivka, Poltava Oblast

== Sumy Oblast ==
- Serhiivka, Sumy Oblast

== Volyn Oblast ==
- Serhiivka, Volyn Oblast

== Zaporizhzhia Oblast ==
- Serhiivka, Mykhailivka rural hromada, Zaporizhzhia Raion, Zaporizhzhia Oblast
- Serhiivka, Novomykolaivka settlement hromada, Zaporizhzhia Raion, Zaporizhzhia Oblast

== Zhytomyr Oblast ==
- Serhiivka, Zhytomyr Oblast

== See also ==
- Sergeyevka (disambiguation)
