= Sergeyevka, Fatezhsky District, Kursk Oblast =

Rural locality in Kursk Oblast, Russia

Sergeyevka Сергеевка
- Village
- Interactive map of Sergeyevka
- Location of Sergeyevka Sergeyevka (Kursk Oblast)
- Coordinates: 52°17′34″N 35°49′26″E
- Country: Russia
- Federal subject: Kursk Oblast
- Administrative district: Fatezhsky District
- SelsovietSelsoviet: Verkhnelyubazhsky

Population (2010 Census)
  - Total: 35
  - Estimate (2010): 35 (0%)

Municipal status
  - Municipal district: Fatezhsky Municipal District
  - Rural settlement: Verkhnelyubazhsky Selsoviet Rural Settlement
- Time zone: UTC+3 (MSK)
- Postal code: 307123
- Dialing code: +7 47144
- OKTMO ID: 38644416161
- Website: моверхнелюбажский.рф

Sergeyevka (Russian: Сергеевка) is a rural locality (Russian: деревня, lit. 'village') in Verkhnelyubazhsky Selsoviet Rural Settlement, Fatezhsky District, Kursk Oblast, Russia. The population as of 2010 is 35.
