= Sergeyevka, Paninsky District, Voronezh Oblast =

Sergeyevka Сергеевка
- Selo
- Location within Voronezh Oblast Location within Russia
- Coordinates: 51°33′N 40°12′E
- Country: Russia
- Region: Voronezh Oblast
- District: Paninsky District
- Time zone: UTC+3:00

Sergeyevka (Russian: Сергеевка) is a rural locality (a selo) in Oktyabrskoye Rural Settlement, Paninsky District, Voronezh Oblast, Russia. The population was 217 as of 2010. There are 4 streets.

== Geography ==
Sergeyevka is located 14 km southeast of Panino (the district's administrative centre) by road. Toyda is the nearest rural locality.
