= Aleksandr Sergeyev =

Aleksandr Sergeyev may refer to:

- Aleksandr Sergeyev (canoeist) (born 1994), Russian canoeist
- Aleksandr Sergeyev (chess player) (1897–1970), Russian chess player
- Aleksandr Sergeyev (footballer, born 1998), Russian football player
- Alexander Sergeev (physicist) (born 1955), Russian physicist
- Aleksandr Sergeyev (triple jumper) (born 1983), Russian triple jumper
