= Sergeyevka, Meleuzovsky District, Republic of Bashkortostan =

Sergeyevka Сергеевка
- Village
- Location within Bashkortostan Location within Russia
- Coordinates: 53°04′N 56°29′E
- Country: Russia
- Region: Bashkortostan
- District: Meleuzovsky District
- Time zone: UTC+5:00

Sergeyevka (Russian: Сергеевка; Bashkir: Һәргәй, Härgäy) is a rural locality (a village) in Nugushevsky Selsoviet, Meleuzovsky District, Bashkortostan, Russia. The population was 191 as of 2010. There are 12 streets.

== Geography ==
Sergeyevka is located 48 km northeast of Meleuz (the district's administrative centre) by road. Nugush is the nearest rural locality.
