= Sergeyevka, Ternovsky District, Voronezh Oblast =

Sergeyevka Сергеевка
- Village
- Location within Voronezh Oblast Location within Russia
- Coordinates: 51°35′N 41°45′E
- Country: Russia
- Region: Voronezh Oblast
- District: Ternovsky District
- Time zone: UTC+3:00

Sergeyevka (Russian: Сергеевка) is a rural locality (a village) in Narodnenskoye Rural Settlement, Ternovsky District, Voronezh Oblast, Russia. The population was 76 as of 2010. There are 3 streets.

== Geography ==
It is located on the right bank of the Karachan River, 10 km southeast of Ternovka.
