= Sergeyevka, Belgorod Oblast =

Sergeyevka Сергеевка
- Selo
- Location within Belgorod Oblast Location within Russia
- Coordinates: 51°10′N 38°16′E
- Country: Russia
- Region: Belgorod Oblast
- District: Starooskolsky District
- Time zone: UTC+3:00

Sergeyevka (Russian: Сергеевка) is a rural locality (a selo) in Starooskolsky District, Belgorod Oblast, Russia. The population was 89 as of 2010. There is 1 street.

== Geography ==
Sergeyevka is located 45 km southeast of Stary Oskol (the district's administrative centre) by road. Znamenka is the nearest rural locality.
