= Sergeyevka, Ertilsky District, Voronezh Oblast =

Sergeyevka Сергеевка
- Settlement
- Location within Voronezh Oblast Location within Russia
- Coordinates: 51°39′N 40°43′E
- Country: Russia
- Region: Voronezh Oblast
- District: Ertilsky District
- Time zone: UTC+3:00

Sergeyevka (Russian: Сергеевка) is a rural locality (a settlement) in Pervomayskoye Rural Settlement, Ertilsky District, Voronezh Oblast, Russia. The population was 398 as of 2010. There are 7 streets.

== Geography ==
Sergeyevka is located 30 km southwest of Ertil (the district's administrative centre) by road. Pervomaysky is the nearest rural locality.
