= Sergeyevka, Miyakinsky District, Republic of Bashkortostan =

Sergeyevka Сергеевка
- Village
- Location within Bashkortostan Location within Russia
- Coordinates: 53°46′N 55°02′E
- Country: Russia
- Region: Bashkortostan
- District: Miyakinsky District
- Time zone: UTC+5:00

Sergeyevka (Russian: Сергеевка) is a rural locality (a village) in Ilchigulovsky Selsoviet, Miyakinsky District, Bashkortostan, Russia. The population was 78 as of 2010. There is 1 street.

== Geography ==
Sergeyevka is located 47 km northeast of Kirgiz-Miyaki (the district's administrative centre) by road. Ilchigulovo is the nearest rural locality.
