= Sergeyevka, Dyurtyulinsky District, Republic of Bashkortostan =

Sergeyevka Сергеевка
- Village
- Location within Bashkortostan Location within Russia
- Coordinates: 55°35′N 55°03′E
- Country: Russia
- Region: Bashkortostan
- District: Dyurtyulinsky District
- Time zone: UTC+5:00

Sergeyevka (Russian: Сергеевка) is a rural locality (a village) in Uchpilinsky Selsoviet, Dyurtyulinsky District, Bashkortostan, Russia. The population was 4 as of 2010. There is 1 street.

== Geography ==
Sergeyevka is located 28 km northeast of Dyurtyuli (the district's administrative centre) by road. Novokangyshevo is the nearest rural locality.
