= Sergeyevka, Buzdyaksky District, Republic of Bashkortostan =

Sergeyevka Сергеевка
- Selo
- Location within Bashkortostan Location within Russia
- Coordinates: 54°35′N 54°38′E
- Country: Russia
- Region: Bashkortostan
- District: Buzdyaksky District
- Time zone: UTC+5:00

Sergeyevka (Russian: Сергеевка) is a rural locality (a selo) in Buzdyaksky Selsoviet, Buzdyaksky District, Bashkortostan, Russia. The population was 702 as of 2010. There are 5 streets.

== Geography ==
Sergeyevka is located 8 km northeast of Buzdyak (the district's administrative centre) by road. Tuktarkul is the nearest rural locality.
