= Sergeyevka, Fyodorovsky District, Republic of Bashkortostan =

Sergeyevka Сергеевка
- Selo
- Location within Bashkortostan Location within Russia
- Coordinates: 53°01′N 55°19′E
- Country: Russia
- Region: Bashkortostan
- District: Fyodorovsky District
- Time zone: UTC+5:00

Sergeyevka (Russian: Сергеевка) is a rural locality (a selo) in Bala-Chetyrmansky Selsoviet, Fyodorovsky District, Bashkortostan, Russia. The population was 13 as of 2010. There is 1 street.

== Geography ==
Sergeyevka is located 35 km southeast of Fyodorovka (the district's administrative centre) by road. Novosofiyevka is the nearest rural locality.
