= Sergeyevka, Sterlibashevsky District, Republic of Bashkortostan =

Sergeyevka Сергеевка
- Khutor
- Location within Bashkortostan Location within Russia
- Coordinates: 53°19′N 55°25′E
- Country: Russia
- Region: Bashkortostan
- District: Sterlibashevsky District
- Time zone: UTC+5:00

Sergeyevka (Russian: Сергеевка) is a rural locality (a khutor) in Kundryaksky Selsoviet, Sterlibashevsky District, Bashkortostan, Russia. The population was 33 as of 2010. There is 1 street.

== Geography ==
Sergeyevka is located 10 km southeast of Sterlibashevo (the district's administrative centre) by road. Borisovka is the nearest rural locality.
