= Maria Sergeyeva =

Russian political activist

- Born: Maria Sergeyeva; 10 September 1985 (age 41)
- Occupation: Political Activist

Maria Sergeyeva is a Russian political activist.

== Personal life ==
Sergeyeva was born on September 9, 1984 into a working-class family. Her father was a metal worker and her mother an accountant. Formerly a member of the Democratic Party of Russia, she left the party because of its support for Russia's inclusion in the European Union. In 2006, she joined the United Russia Young Guard,. She continues to keep the public apprised of her political thoughts through her LiveJournal blog. She also posts about her personal life there, including provocative and candid photographs with such captions as, "I'm at a conference, drunk," in describing one picture.

Sergeyeva is a philosophy student and a political activist identified with Russia's right-wing political movement. She is a nationalist and has said, "I was brought up to be a patriot from day one. My love for Russia came with my mother's milk. I loved listening to my grandparents' heroic tales from the war. [Vladimir] Putin has given us stability and economic growth. It's good that he's hardline and tough."

== Political activism ==
After she delivered a speech in early 2009 praising Russian president Dmitry Medvedev, her popularity became such that Russia's largest political blog had to remove references to "Masha" (short name for Maria in Russian) due to excessive bandwidth use. Sergeyeva's physical attractiveness has been noted by several media outlets as a possible catalyst to her political popularity, and she sometimes comments on what she perceives as her political opponents' lack of physical attractiveness in some of her political commentary.

== Political beliefs ==
Sergeyeva holds to nationalist, right-wing philosophies such as opposition to illegal immigration, support for Russian manufacturers, and distrust of intervention by the United States in Eastern European affairs. Her ambition is to become an MP and eventually a minister.

In breaking with traditional right-wing politics, she has become more pro-environment, stating, "Before I found out a rubbish burning plant was going to be built right underneath my window, I did not think about ecological issues at all. I understood that Moscow has a large population, many cars, and therefore a lot of pollution, but the problem, just like for most Russians, did not hit close to home. After it sunk in that I was going to have to breathe in filthy air, I began reading a lot about the issue."

== Criticism ==
Despite her reputation as a Russian nationalist, she considers herself a fan of Margaret Thatcher, Winston Churchill, and others she describes as "independent thinkers". At the same time, she has also called Catherine the Great "a great leader".
