= Kudintsevo =

Rural locality in Kursk Oblast, Russia

Kudintsevo Кудинцево
- Selo
- Interactive map of Kudintsevo
- Location of Kudintsevo Kudintsevo (Kursk Oblast)
- Coordinates: 51°43′29″N 35°11′04″E
- Country: Russia
- Federal subject: Kursk Oblast
- Administrative district: Lgovsky District
- SelsovietSelsoviet: Kudintsevky

Population (2010 Census)
  - Total: 521
  - Estimate (2010): 521 (0%)

Administrative status
  - Capital of: Kudintsevky Selsoviet

Municipal status
  - Municipal district: Lgovsky Municipal District
  - Rural settlement: Kudintsevky Selsoviet Rural Settlement
  - Capital of: Kudintsevky Selsoviet Rural Settlement
- Time zone: UTC+3 (MSK)
- Postal code: 307731
- Dialing code: +7 47140
- OKTMO ID: 38622450101
- Website: kudincevo.ru

Kudintsevo (Russian: Кудинцево) is a rural locality (Russian: село, lit. 'village') and the administrative center of Kudintsevky Selsoviet Rural Settlement, Lgovsky District, Kursk Oblast, Russia. Population: 521 (2010 census); 670 (2002 census);

== Geography ==
The village is located on the Seym River, 51 km from the Russia–Ukraine border, 70 km west of Kursk, 9 km north-west of the district center – the town Lgov.

Climate

Kudintsevo has a warm-summer humid continental climate (Dfb in the Köppen climate classification).

Climate data for Kudintsevo
Month	Jan	Feb	Mar	Apr	May	Jun	Jul	Aug	Sep	Oct	Nov	Dec	Year
Mean daily maximum °C (°F)	−3.8 (25.2)	−2.8 (27.0)	3.2 (37.8)	13.2 (55.8)	19.5 (67.1)	22.8 (73.0)	25.3 (77.5)	24.6 (76.3)	18.3 (64.9)	10.7 (51.3)	3.6 (38.5)	−0.9 (30.4)	11.1 (52.1)
Daily mean °C (°F)	−5.9 (21.4)	−5.3 (22.5)	−0.5 (31.1)	8.4 (47.1)	14.9 (58.8)	18.5 (65.3)	21 (70)	20 (68)	14.1 (57.4)	7.4 (45.3)	1.4 (34.5)	−2.9 (26.8)	7.6 (45.7)
Mean daily minimum °C (°F)	−8.3 (17.1)	−8.4 (16.9)	−4.6 (23.7)	3 (37)	9.2 (48.6)	13.2 (55.8)	15.9 (60.6)	14.9 (58.8)	9.9 (49.8)	4.1 (39.4)	−0.9 (30.4)	−5.1 (22.8)	3.6 (38.4)
Average precipitation mm (inches)	50 (2.0)	44 (1.7)	48 (1.9)	50 (2.0)	63 (2.5)	71 (2.8)	77 (3.0)	54 (2.1)	57 (2.2)	57 (2.2)	48 (1.9)	49 (1.9)	668 (26.2)
Source: https://en.climate-data.org/asia/russian-federation/kursk-oblast/кудинцево-520425/

== Transport ==
Kudintsevo is located 37 km from the road of regional importance 38K-038 (Fatezh – Dmitriyev), 13.5 km from the road 38K-005 (Konyshyovka – Zhigayevo – 38K-038), 5.5 km from the road 38K-023 (Lgov – Konyshyovka), 9 km from the road 38K-017 (Kursk – Lgov – Rylsk – border with Ukraine), on the road of intermunicipal significance 38Н-440 (Lgov – Kudintsevo), 5 km from the nearest railway station Sherekino (railway line Navlya – Lgov-Kiyevsky).

The rural locality is situated 76 km from Kursk Vostochny Airport, 153 km from Belgorod International Airport and 279 km from Voronezh Peter the Great Airport.
