= Gheorghe Clime =

Romanian fascist politician and founding member of the Iron Guard

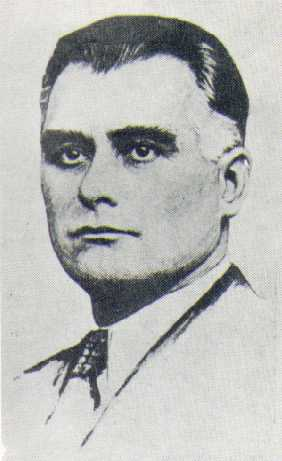
- Born: 1889; Oancea, Covurlui County (now Galați County), Romania
- Died: 22 September 1939 (aged 49/50); Râmnicu Sărat Prison, Buzău County, Kingdom of Romania
- Cause of death: Execution by shooting
- Resting place: Predeal, Romania
- Political party: Totul pentru Țară

Gheorghe Clime (1889 – 22 September 1939) was a Romanian fascist politician, leading member of the Iron Guard, and president of its electoral wing, Totul pentru Țară.

== Early life ==
Gheorghe Clime was born in 1889 in Oancea, Covurlui County (today Galați County), a commune in the historic region of Moldavia. He graduated from the Școală Superioară de Silvicultură (Academy of Silviculture) in Brănești, Ilfov County, a city located about 25 km from the Romanian capital, Bucharest, where he trained as a forestry engineer. Following this, he was licensed in law, and practiced as a lawyer in Domnești, Argeș County.

== Political activity ==
Clime first became involved in nationalist political organizing in his school days, first as a member of the nationalist group "Avântul", where he became acquainted with philosopher Nae Ionescu.

He later became acquainted with A. C. Cuza, the founder of the National-Christian Defense League, an antisemitic and ultranationalist political party created in 1923. Clime was named Vice-President of the National-Christian Defense League for the region of Moldova for a short period of time.

By 1926, following a split in the League, Clime left and forged a closer relationship with fellow ex-member Corneliu Zelea Codreanu. In July 1927, Codreanu announced the foundation the Legion of the Archangel Michael (or Legionary Movement), a new militant fascist, Orthodox, and ultranationalist group. Clime soon began collaborating on Pământul strămoșesc, an early Legionary periodical published beginning in August 1927. On 8 November 1927, Clime, alongside other founding members of the movement (including Codreanu, Ion Moța, Ilie Gârneață, Corneliu Georgescu, and Radu Mironovici, among others) took an oath as members of the Legionary Movement.

During the 1932 Romanian general election, Clime ran as a candidate under the Legion's electoral name "Garda de fier" ("Iron Guard") in Domnești. The party earned 5 seats in the Chamber of Deputies, with 70,674 votes (around 2.44% total).

Following the assassination of Prime Minister Ion G. Duca in 1933 by an Iron Guard death squad, Clime was caught carrying Legionary publications and arrested together with other close associates of the Legionary Movement. Imprisoned briefly at Jilava Prison, he was acquitted of all charges in April 1934. That year, he and his family relocated to Bucharest, where he was promoted to General Secretary of the Legionary Movement. In December 1936, Codreanu established the rank of "Commander of the Annunciation" (in Romanian, "Comandant al Bunei Vestiri") within the Legionary Movement, denoting the highest level in the Legion's hierarchy, and Clime was promoted to this rank alongside other founding members Ion Moța, Corneliu Georgescu, Ilie Gârneață, Radu Mironovici, Mille Lefter, and Ion Blănaru.

In 1936, Clime was put in charge of the newly-founded Corpul Muncitoresc Legionar ("Legionary Workers' Corps"), a workers' faction of the movement. Later that year, following the outbreak of the Spanish Civil War, the Legionary Movement organized a team of volunteers to fight against the Republicans, on the side of the Nationalists. Led by Gheorghe (Zizi) Cantacuzino, the team of volunteers consisted of Clime, Ion Moța, Vasile Marin, Alexandru Cantacuzino, Bănică Dobre, Ion Dumitrescu-Borşa, and Niculae Totu. After the deaths of Moța and Marin (see: Funerals of Ion Moța and Vasile Marin) the team returned to Romania.

After the death of Gheorghe Cantacuzino in 1937, Clime succeeded him as President of Totul pentru Țară ("Everything for the Country"), the Legionary Movement's electoral party. In the same year's general election, the party earned 66 seats in the Chamber of Deputies, with around 15.81% of the total vote.

== Arrest and death ==
In 1938, due in part to the rise in popularity of the Legionary Movement, King Carol II staged a self-coup and initiated a royal dictatorship, suspending the country's constitution and all civil liberties, and imposing martial law. Carol II then began a crackdown on the Movement. In the spring of 1938, Corneliu Zelea Codreanu was convicted of libel and high treason and sentenced to 10 years in prison. Clime, as a leader of the Movement, was also arrested and was sentenced to 7 years in prison. He was imprisoned at Râmnicu Sărat Prison. During this time, Codreanu designated Clime as the second-in-command of the Movement, confirming him as his successor. In prison, Clime and other leading members of the Movement (including Alexandru Cantacuzino, Constantin Papanace, and Vasile Chritescu) formed a "radical", orthodox core of the Legionary Movement, refusing to sign concessions to Carol II and continuing to organize Legionnaires. From those Legionnaires not imprisoned, a provisional leadership was organized, including eventual leader Horia Sima. During the night of November 29–30, 1938, Codreanu and several other leading Legionnaires were assassinated by prison guards, leading to a crisis in the leadership of the Movement.

In September 1939, Prime Minister Armand Călinescu, an instrumental opponent of the Movement, was assassinated by Legionnaires under the direction of Horia Sima. In reprisal, the authorities massacred the remaining Legionnaires imprisoned at Râmnicu Sărat, including Clime. Clime was killed during the night of September 21–22, 1939, and was buried in Predeal.

Clime was rehabilitated and acquitted postmortem during the short-lived National Legionary State in 1940.
