= Ioan Moța =

Romanian Orthodox priest, nationalist politician and journalist

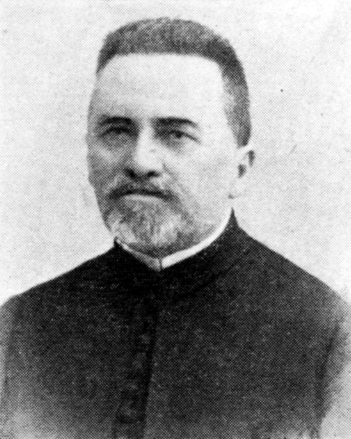
- Ioan Moța in the mid-1930s.
- Born: 15 December 1868; Nojag, Austria-Hungary
- Died: 20 November 1940 (aged 71); Bucharest, Romania
- Citizenship: Austria-Hungary, Romania

Ioan Moța (Romanian pronunciation: [iˈo̯an ˈmot͡sa]; Nojag, Hunedoara County, 15 December 1868 – Bucharest, 20 November 1940) was a Romanian Orthodox priest, nationalist politician, and journalist, as well as father to prominent Iron Guard personality Ion Moța.

== Biography ==
Ioan Moța was born in Nojag, Austria-Hungary (today Certeju de Sus, Hunedoara County, Romania), on 15 December 1868, although some sources list his date of birth as 31 December. His father was a priest.

Moța attended school in Nojag, Brad, and Brașov. After completing secondary school, he attended a theological seminary in Sibiu. He was ordained a priest in 1899.

While in Sibiu, he became interested in journalism, and founded the journal Foaia Poporului ("The People's Paper"). He also became involved in Romanian nationalist politics, seeking the unification of Transylvania with Romania. After moving to Oraștie in 1899, he wrote for the newspapers Bunul Econom ("The Good Economist") and Libertatea ("Freedom"), the latter of which was edited alongside several prominent Romanian nationalist figures. Ownership and editorship of Libertatea was later transferred to Moța. Facing suppression of the newspaper in Austria-Hungary, Moța relocated to Bucharest, where he continued his journalistic activity.

In 1902, Moța and his wife Maria had a son, Ion Moța, who would later become a prominent member of the far-right, antisemitic Iron Guard.

He enlisted in the Romanian Army during the First World War. During this period, he also collaborated with the newspaper Epoca ("The Epoch", edited by Nicolae Filipescu), writing for a column titled "Ardealul vorbește" ("Ardeal speaks") alongside figures like Octavian Goga and Octavian Codru Tăslăuanu. In March 1917, Moța was a member of a group of exiled Romanian Habsburg subjects who were sent as a delegation to the United States to agitate for the Romanian cause, during which he continued to publish Libertatea out of Cleveland, Ohio.

Moța returned to Transylvania after the unification of Romania, and became protopope of Oraștie. He also became politically involved, running in a series of Romanian elections. He was elected senate representative for Hunedoara County in 1931, as a candidate for Uniunea Națională ("The National Union"). He would later become associated with the National Peasants' Party, and was briefly arrested for his political activity in 1933.

In 1937, after his son Ion was killed when fighting as a Nationalist volunteer in the Spanish Civil War, Ioan Moța gave him a memorial editorship role at Libertatea. The deceased Ion Moța was listed as "Director sufletesc" ("Soul director" or "Spiritual director") of the newspaper from March 1937 onwards.

After suffering from pulmonary edema, Moța died on 20 November 1940 at Sf. Elena Hospital in Bucharest. His death was attended by several prominent Iron Guard members, including Ilie Gârneața and Elena Codreanu (the widow of Corneliu Zelea Codreanu). A state funeral service was held on 22 November at Sf. Ilie-Gorgani Church, after which he was transported via Bucharest's Gara de Nord to be buried in Oraștie. His funeral was elaborately coordinated, and was attended by representatives of the royal family and of Germany, Spain, Japan, and Italy, as well as members of government and representatives from the Romanian Academy. His body was followed to Oraștie by an honour guard of Legionnaires.

== Journalistic works ==
- "Foaia Poporului", Sibiu (1893–1895).
- "Revista Orăștiei", Orăștie (1895–1898).
- "Telegraful Român" (1898–1899).
- "Bunul Econom", Orăștie (1899–1901).
- "Libertatea", Orăștie (1902–1915, 1919–1933), Cleveland, Ohio (1917).
- "Foaia Interesantă", Cleveland, Ohio (1917).

== See also ==
- Ion Moța, his son; prominent member of the Iron Guard.
