= Funerals of Ion Moța and Vasile Marin =

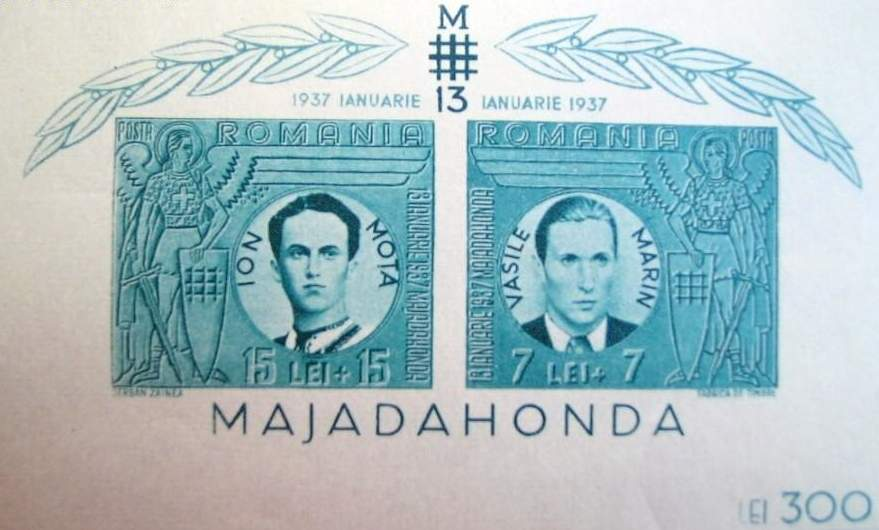
1941 stamp commemorating the deaths of Moța and Marin

On January 13, 1937, Ion Moța (1902–1937) and Vasile Marin (1904–1937), leaders of the Iron Guard, were killed in battle at Majadahonda while fighting on the side of Francoist Spain during the Spanish Civil War. They subsequently received a highly-organized, cross-country funeral procession.

The funerary train of the two toured around the country, with hundreds of thousands of people participating at the commemorations in many cities, holding religious services at several cathedrals. In Bucharest, thousands of young Legionnaires (Note: Members of the Iron Guard.) marched on the streets of the city dressed in their typical green shirts.

As a result of these displays, the Iron Guard's party, Totul Pentru Țară, gained an unexpectedly high percentage of votes in the 1937 Romanian general election (15.58%), becoming the third-largest party in Romania. Its membership grew threefold.

== Background ==
The Iron Guard (also known as the Legionary Movement, or Legion of the Archangel Michael) formed as a splinter group from A. C. Cuza's antisemitic and nationalist National-Christian Defense League, forming around Corneliu Zelea Codreanu. The new group advocated action, "spiritual values" over economic ones, the creation of a "new man", and self-sacrifice as the key for the success of the movement.

As the Spanish Civil War began in 1936, the Iron Guard, like much of the Romanian public, saw it in a simple dichotomy: a fight between atheistic communism and Christianity. This opinion was enforced by the news that some groups on the Republican side systematically persecuted members of the Catholic clergy and destroyed churches.

Ion Moța, the second-in-command in the Legion, suggested that a number of leaders of the Iron Guard should go to Spain and present a gift (a Toledo sword) to Francoist General José Moscardó Ituarte, then fight alongside the Nationalist forces.

The group that formed consisted of eight members: Moța, Marin, Alexandru Cantacuzino, General Gheorghe Cantacuzino-Grănicerul, Gheorghe Clime, the priest Ion Dumitrescu Borşa, Bănica Dobre, and Neculai Totu. They were involved in the battles near Madrid, and on January 13, 1937, at the front in Majadahonda, Ion Moța and Vasile Marin were killed by an artillery shell. After the deaths of Moța and Marin, the remaining Legionnaires repatriated their bodies and returned to Romania.

== Funeral procession ==
=== Funerary train ===
The bodies of Moța and Marin were put in a mortuary train which left Spain via France and Belgium, reaching Berlin on February 6, 1937, where they were met by SS and SA squads, representatives of the German Nazi Party, of the Spanish Falange, and of Fascist Italy, as well as a large crowd of onlookers.

Map showing the route taken by the funerary train across Romania

After transiting through Poland, on February 9, the train reached the Romanian border, but instead of taking the shortest route to Bucharest, it made a detour by going through the whole country, from Bukovina to Moldavia, then Transylvania, Oltenia, and Wallachia, and finally reaching Bucharest. The train stopped at the country's major railway stations, and in each of them a religious service was performed. The Iron Guard leaders then urged the audience to join their "Legionary faith".

In Pașcani, in the historical region of Moldavia, over 5000 peasants gathered to see the mortuary wagon; in Bacău, a group of 30 priests performed religious services in front of a crowd.

In Transylvania, the most important stop was in Cluj, where many local politicians and intellectuals participated at the commemoration, including Alexandru Vaida-Voievod, Sextil Pușcariu, Emil Hațieganu and Ioan Lupaș. The service was held by Bishop Nicolae Colan, who praised the struggle of Moța and Marin against the "red madness". Ion Agârbiceanu held a speech in the name of the Romanian Greek-Catholic Church. Large crowds also gathered in Orăștie, Moța's native town, and in Sibiu, where 32 priests conducted the religious rituals.

After crossing the Carpathians, the train went through Oltenia and Wallachia (where it made a notable stop in Pitești), finally reaching Bucharest's Gara de Nord station in the morning of February 11, 1937.

=== Funeral procession in Bucharest ===
It was in Bucharest that the biggest procession took place: as the government had lifted a preexisting ban on wearing uniforms in public places, thousands of Legionnaires donned their green uniforms to wait for the coffins in front of the city's main railway station. Further tens of thousands of sympathizers and bystanders watched the procession and followed it through the city.

In addition, a large number of Romanian politicians, professors, and students, as well as diplomatic and party representatives from Italy, Germany, and Spain were present.

After a short religious service, in front of the coffins, the Legionnaires performed the "Oath for Ion Moța and Vasile Marin", written by Legionary "Captain" Corneliu Zelea Codreanu. In this oath, Legionnaires swore to be "ready for death at any time".

The procession marched toward Sf. Ilie-Gorgani Church in central Bucharest, where the bodies were to be kept until their burial. This church had been frequented by members of the Legion since the late 1920s, was partially rebuilt by them, and was located meters away from the Legion's original headquarters on Strada Gutenberg. The funeral procession was led by a group of Legionnaires who carrying the crosses of the two fighters, followed by students, representatives of Hitler, Mussolini, and Franco, a large number of priests, and a human cross formed by marching Legionnaires.

=== Burial ===
Moța and Marin were interred on February 13, 1937, next to the new headquarters of the movement, the Casa Verde ("Green House") in Bucureștii Noi. A mausoleum was specially-built, a decision made by Codreanu in order to inspire future Legionnaires. The religious services were led by an estimated 200 to 400 priests.

Five surviving Legionnaires who fought in Spain took part in the next stage of the procession. Pedro de Prat y Soutzo, Nationalist Spain's diplomatic representative, called out the names of the Legionary volunteers, and the names of Moța and Marin were answered with "Present!". This call and response would continue to be used in commemorations of Legionary martyrs; similar roll calls were found in other fascist movements (for example, it was the focal point in the 1932 Garibaldian Celebrations in Fascist Italy).

It is unclear where Moța and Marin's remains are currently buried; the Casa Verde was re-appropriated after the Legionary rebellion in January 1941, later becoming a maternity hospital and then, during the communist era, a driving school. The mausoleum structure in the yard of the Casa Verde has been demolished, though the main building and yard remain.

== Reactions ==
=== Press ===
One of the most influential Romanian newspapers, Universul, provided ample updates on the commemoration of the two throughout the country. Even so, the students who were members of the Iron Guard accused the newspaper of not doing enough to support the Legion's activity in Spain, while the director of the newspaper defended himself by saying that more is not possible to do because of the state censorship.

Left-wing newspapers like Adevărul and Dimineața chose to ignore the event to prevent it from gaining more public attention.

=== Politicians ===
Many of the country's right-wing politicians, whether members of the Iron Guard or other rival parties, paid their respects to the death of the two fighters.

Nicolae Iorga wrote a laudative article called "Two Brave Boys" in which the two were praised for fighting for the Christian faith, although weeks later, he condemned the rituals of the Legion, including the usage of a pagan symbol, the swastika.

Gheorghe I. Brătianu, the leader of National Liberal Party-Brătianu, a splinter group of the National Liberal Party, also paid respects to the two Iron Guard members, calling Moța one of the "most capable and honest fighters from the Legionary ranks".

=== Popular opinion ===
The Romanian public generally sympathised with the cause of Moța and Marin, because their struggle in Spain was depicted as being part of a fight between communist atheism and Christianity. Many bystanders and non-partisans were impressed by the mystical rituals of the Iron Guard.

The Church showed vigorous support for the movement, conducting religious services across the country and bishops openly praising Moța and Marin in their speeches.

== Legacy ==
Before the deaths, the ideology of "self-sacrifice" of the Iron Guard was often seen as mere rhetoric, but now, the Legionary movement was able to argue that it has created the "new man" that was able to give one's life for the ideological goals.

The funerals made the cause of the Iron Guard better known and from January 1937 to the end of the year, the number of members of the Legion grew from 96,000 to 272,000. The popularity of the Iron Guard was shown in the December 1937 elections, when it was able to gain 15.5% of the votes, becoming the third largest party in the Romanian Parliament.

The movement was eventually repressed by Carol II's royal dictatorship regime and its revolutionary fascist project failed. Nevertheless, this burial remains as a political manifestation of a size that was not found elsewhere in Romanian history.

In the 1970s, a large monument was erected to Moța and Marin at the site of their death in Majadahonda, near Madrid, Spain. Services continue to be held there, and at Sf. Ilie-Gorgani Church in Bucharest, on the anniversary of their deaths.
