= Crețu River =

Crețu River may refer to:

- Crețu, a tributary of the Șercaia in Brașov County, Romania
- Crețu, a tributary of the Moneasa in Arad County, Romania
- Izvorul Crețu River, right tributary of the river Someșul Mare in Bistrița-Năsăud County, Romania

== See also ==
- Crețu, a village in Dâmbovița County, Romania
- Crețu (surname)
