= Crețu =

Crețu is a common family name in Romania. Persons named Crețu include:

- Alexandru Crețu (born 1992), Romanian Saudi Pro Legue footballer
- Cezar Crețu (born 2001), Romanian tennis player
- Corina Crețu (born 1967), Romanian politician
- Ester Alexandra Crețu (born 1993), Romanian singer and songwriter
- Gabriela Crețu (born 1965), Romanian politician
- Geani Crețu (born 2000), Romanian soccer player
- Gheorghe Crețu (born 1968), Romanian volleyball coach
- Michael Cretu (born 1957), Romanian-German musician
- Răducan Creţu (1931–2011), birth name of Romanian jazz musician Johnny Răducanu
- Sandra Cretu (born 1962), Michael Cretu's former wife
- Serghei Cretu (born 1971), Moldovan weightlifter
- Thomas Crețu (born 2002), French-born Romanian rugby player
- Valentin Crețu (luger) (born 1989), Romanian luger
- Valentin Crețu (footballer) (born 1989), Romanian footballer
- Vlad Crețu, Romanian musician

== See also ==
- Crețu, a village in Ciocănești Commune, Dâmbovița County, Romania
- Crețu River (disambiguation)
