= Alexandru Cantacuzino (militant) =

Romanian lawyer and politician

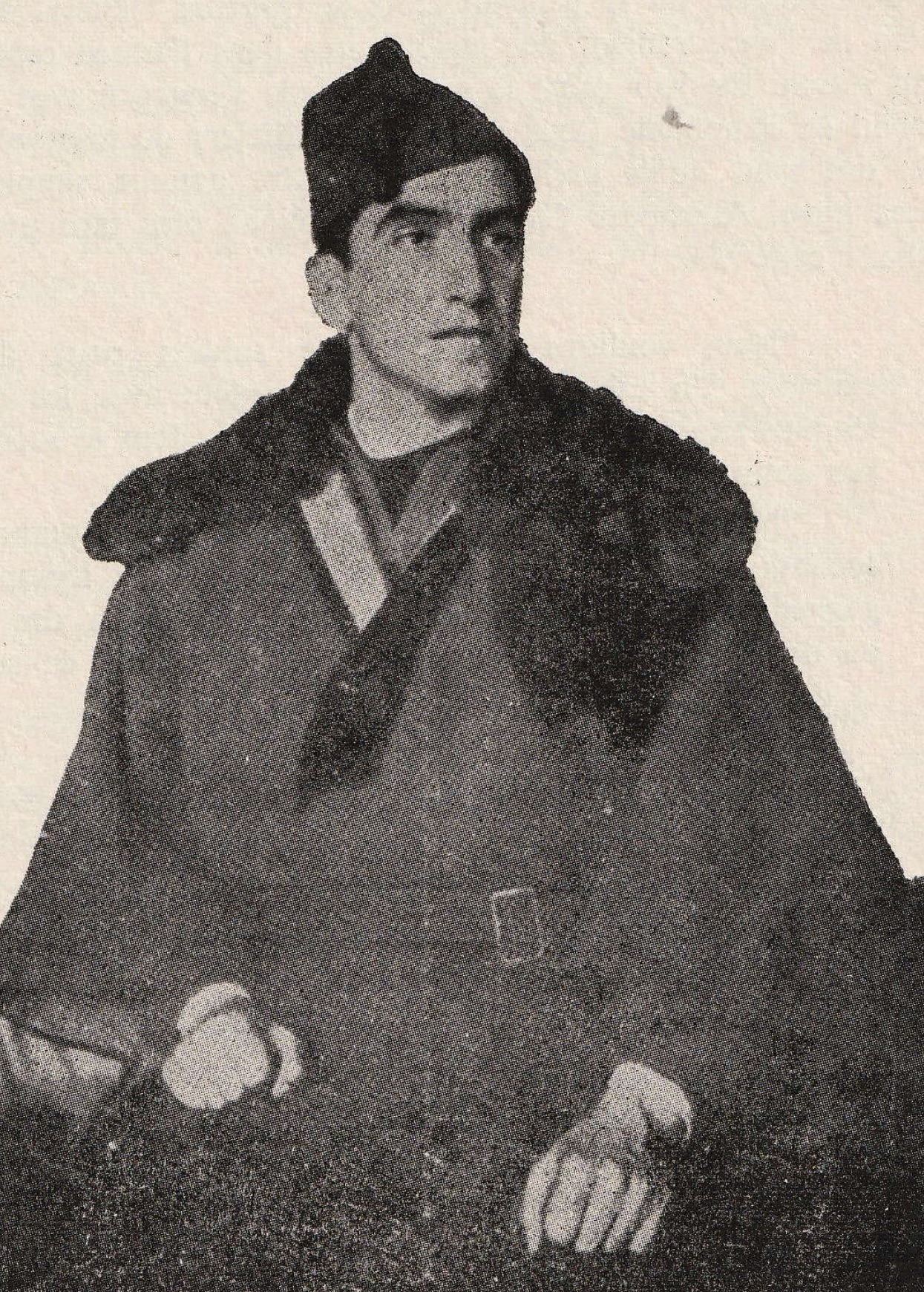
- Cantacuzino in Spain, 1937
- Born: 1901; Ciocănești, Ilfov County, Kingdom of Romania
- Died: September 22, 1939 (aged 37–38); Râmnicu Sărat Prison, Kingdom of Romania
- Cause of death: Execution by shooting
- Resting place: Legionary Cemetery, Predeal
- Education: University of Bucharest
- Occupations: Diplomat, politician
- Political party: Iron Guard
- Relatives: Cantacuzino family

Prince Alexandru Cantacuzino (1901 – 22 September 1939) was a Romanian lawyer and politician, a leading member of the Legionary Movement (popularly known as the Iron Guard), and a close collaborator of Legionary leader Corneliu Zelea Codreanu. He notably devised a plot to overthrow Carol II, King of Romania, a plan that would be taken over by Legionary leader and later Vice President of the Council of Ministers Horia Sima. Cantacuzino was killed on September 22, 1939, at the prison in Râmnicu Sărat, during a retaliation operation ordered by Carol II following the assassination of Prime Minister Armand Călinescu.

== Biography ==
Prince Alexandru Cantacuzino was born in 1901 in the commune of Ciocănești, Ilfov County, in the Ghica-Cantacuzino mansion, today a historical monument. He was a descendant of the Greek family of Cantacuzino, a noble family active in the 17th to 19th centuries in current-day Romania (then Wallachia, Moldavia, and the Kingdom of Romania). He studied in Paris and then at the Hague Academy of International Law, obtaining a bachelor's degree, and later at the University of Bucharest, where he received a doctorate of law. He opted for a diplomatic career, beginning as chief of staff at the Romanian Ministry of Foreign Affairs (1926–1927), then as secretary of legation and head of Romanian affairs in the Hague and Warsaw.

Attracted by emerging far-right and fascist politics in Romania, Cantacuzino began contributing to the Bucharest-based Legionary newspaper, Axa, then edited by notable far-right figures such as Ion Moța, Vasile Cristescu, Alexandru Constant, Mihail Polihroniade, and Mircea Eliade. He also contributed writings to magazines Convorbiri literare, Cuvântul studențesc, Vestitorii, and Libertatea.

=== Political activity ===
==== Public activity ====
Cantacuzino joined the Legionary Movement, also known as the Iron Guard or the Legion of the Archangel Michael, and became one of the closest collaborators of the "Căpitanul", Corneliu Zelea Codreanu, who awarded him the highest rank in the Legionary hierarchy, "Commander of the Annunciation" ("Comandant al Bunei Vestiri"). He came to the attention of the state authorities after participating in the organization of the Student Congresses in Craiova (April 1935) and in Târgu Mureș (April 1936), which culminated in demonstrations and serious disturbances of public order. The congress in Craiova focused dominantly on the “affirmation of the Legionary faith” on the part of students, and the subsequent congress in Târgu Mureș was much more aggressive, openly denouncing the so-called "occult forces" (supposedly Jews) that led Romanian politics and were responsible for the persecution of Legionary students. Elena Lupescu, the Jewish mistress and later wife of Carol II, was specifically targeted at this congress, alongside Virgil Madgearu, General Gabriel Marinescu, and later Prime Minister Armand Călinescu, whom Legionary students believed to be conspiring to assassinate Codreanu. Cantacuzino was, according to Horia Sima's later recollection, one of the most virulent speakers to appear before the congress.

In 1936, Cantacuzino left with the legionary team led by General Gheorghe Cantacuzino-Grănicerul to fight in the Spanish Civil War on the side of the Franco-led Nationalist faction. He was later decorated with the "Red Cross" by Franco for his participation.

On 17 May 1937, Cantacuzino was sentenced to one year in prison due to his role at the Târgu Mureș Student Congress.

In 1937 Cantacuzino was appointed head of the "Moța-Marin Legionary Corps", set up on orders of Codreanu shortly before the group of Legionnaires left for the Spanish front. This Legionary Corps was to serve as Codreanu's personal guard. It was later intended to be transformed into the elite defence corps of the Legionary movement, "a group of strictly and severely educational essence and heroic inspiration", consisting of 10,033 "fighters" under 30 years of age. The intended transformation of this organization was never realized, as the Iron Guard, the electoral front of the Legionary movement, was disbanded with the establishment of a royal dictatorship and the prohibition of any form of political activity.

With the encouragement of Codreanu, Cantacuzino ran in the elections of 20–22 December 1937, representing the Iron Guard in Arad County. He succeeded in achieving one of the highest vote counts obtained by the Legionaries, receiving 32.73% of the vote, and became deputy of Argeș.

==== Clandestine activity ====
On the eve of the establishment of the Royal Dictatorship of Carol II, Armand Călinescu, then serving as Minister of the Interior, issued Order no. 746 of 6 March 1938, ordering all police prefectures and gendarmerie to keep files on Legionnaires and, if they did not comply with the new legislation prohibiting political activity, to arrest them. Theoretically, it was aimed at suppressing any form of political activity, but practically, according to Legionary historian Ilarion Țiu, this order was largely abused, mainly with traps set by the authorities (circulars, orders, and false communiqués issued by the Ministry of Interior in guise of official Legionary bulletins). This order would serve as justification of the later arrest and assassination of Corneliu Zelea Codreanu.

Following Order 746, a wave of arrests of Codreanu's collaborators was launched. On the night of 16–17 April 1938, Corneliu Codreanu and 44 other Legionary leaders were arrested. Cantacuzino was arrested but managed to escape together with Vasile Cristescu, jumping from the window of the train transporting them from the Miercurea Ciuc camp to Jilava Prison. After their escape, somewhere near Brașov, the two split up, Cristescu hiding in Brașov and Cantacuzino in Bucharest, where the latter had numerous relatives holding high positions in Romanian public society, preventing authorities from searching their residences.

Codreanu was sentenced to 10 years of forced labor, and the trial of the other Legionary leaders followed. Initially, they were promised to be released in exchange for a pledge of allegiance to Carol II's leadership. However, every one of the arrestees refused, believing that the European turn towards far-right and fascist leadership would cause them to be released earlier than anticipated. The trial of Legionary leaders began on 25 July 1938 at the Military Tribunal of the Second Army Corps, with the sentence being pronounced on 1 August 1938. Alexandru Cantacuzino and Vasile Cristescu, having escaped, were sentenced to 9 years in prison, whereas the other detainees received a sentence of only 7 years.

Due to this wave of arrests, the Legionary movement lacked its entire senior leadership and was now unable to function. Thus, new leaders came to power, including Horia Sima, Cantacuzino, and Vasile Cristescu. Sima, who had been serving as a provincial leader, replaced Codreanu in the hierarchy of leadership, organizing a "Persecution Command" ("Comandament de prigoană"). Sima then reorganized the movement, limiting the number of a "nest" (the term used for a local Legionary outpost or club) to 5 members and giving each nest greater autonomy and ability to launch actions. Thus, within a few months following the April 1938 wave of arrests, Legionary nests were able to organize under conditions of secrecy, launching a number of manifestos and publications against Armand Călinescu and Prime Minister Nicolae Iorga, who they saw as responsible for the conviction of Codreanu. Publications such as "The Truth About the Trial of Corneliu Z. Codreanu, May 1938" and manifestos against the Royal Dictatorship were also printed, with Sima's Persecution Command directly addressing letters to the authorities.

On 13 October 1938, Alexandru Cantacuzino released a circular declaring that "the Legionary Movement is determined to put an end to Mr. Călinescu's fearlessness". A pamphlet, entitled "Look at These Three" ("Priviți pe acești trei") followed, directly attacking Carol II, Elena Lupescu, and her father. Another manifesto followed, commanding Carol II to "reconcile with the Romanian Nation", lest the Legionaries "find another solution to the open problem". In his later memoirs, Horia Sima noted that these manifestos received greater recognition as they were personally signed by Legionary leaders.

During this time, Cantacuzino began to plot to overthrow Carol II, a plan later modified and realized by Horia Sima.

On 28 October 1938, Cantacuzino was arrested while walking through Bucharest disguised as an officer. He was imprisoned in the Râmnicu Sărat Prison along with the Legionary leaders convicted in the trial of 25 July 1938, namely Gheorghe Clime, Mihail Polihroniade, Traian Cotigă, and Șerban Milcoveanu, among others.

=== Death ===
After refusing to sign a declaration of submission and allegiance to the authorities, Cantacuzino was shot on the night of 21–22 September 1939. The remaining Legionary leaders imprisoned in Râmnicu Sărat were also shot, including Gheorghe Clime, Aurel Serafim, Nicolae Totu, Gheorghe Istrate, Sima Simulescu, Cristian Tell, Gheorghe Furdui, Mihail Polihroniade, Paul Craja, and Gheorghe Apostolescu. The list of those to be shot was reportedly drawn up by Armand Călinescu, alongside police prefect Gavrilă Marinescu and Mihail Moruzov, the Romanian intelligence director. Alexandru Cantacuzino was buried in the Legionary Cemetery in Predeal.

Following the rise to power of Ion Antonescu and Horia Sima on 14 September 1940 (a regime known as the National Legionary State), the 1938 arrest and trial was revised by Decision no. 4 of 21 November 1940 of the Commission for the Review of Political Processes, at which point 19 Legionary leaders, including Alexandru Cantacuzino (second on the list), were acquitted of their sentences.
