= Vasile Marin =

Romanian politician

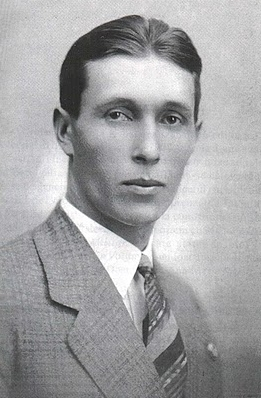
- Born: January 29, 1904; Bucharest, Kingdom of Romania
- Died: January 13, 1937 (aged 32); Majadahonda, Spain
- Cause of death: Killed in action
- Education: University of Bucharest
- Occupation: Lawyer

Vasile Marin (January 29, 1904 – January 13, 1937) was a Romanian politician, public servant and lawyer. A member of the National Peasants' Party until 1932, Vasile Marin later became a prominent member of the Iron Guard, a Romanian fascist organization. His death and that of fellow Iron Guard leader Ion Moța in the Spanish Civil War as volunteers for the Nationalists are credited with contributing to the growth of the Iron Guard.

== Biography ==
His law thesis, finished in 1932 at the University of Bucharest, was entitled "Fascism".

Marin married, with the approval of Legionary leader Corneliu Zelea Codreanu, Ana-Maria Ropală in February 1933. Ropală was the daughter of a Jewish woman who had converted to Christianity and a Romanian army officer. She was a medical doctor. Her brother, Cătălin, was also a Legionnaire.

In December 1936 Marin, along with Ion Moța, participated in leading a small group of Legionnaires into Spain during the Spanish Civil War to present a ceremonial sword to the survivors of the Siege of the Alcázar and announce the alliance of the Iron Guard with Nationalist Spain; they also decided to enlist.

Both Moța and Marin died on January 13, 1937, during the first day of fighting at Majadahonda on the Madrid front. Their funerals in Bucharest (February 13, 1937) were an immense and widely publicised affair attended by some ministers of Nazi Germany, Fascist Italy, and Francisco Franco's Spain, as well as representatives of Portugal, Japan, and delegates of the Polish Patriotic Youth.

A memorial monument was erected at Majadahonda, on September 13, 1970, with the support of Franco's government.

== Bibliography ==
- The Green Shirts and the Others: A History of Fascism in Hungary and Rumania by Nicholas M. Nagy-Talavera (Hoover Institution Press, 1970).
- "Romania" by Eugen Weber, in The European Right: A Historical Profile edited by Hans Rogger and Eugen Weber (University of California Press, 1965)
- The Spanish Civil War 1936-1939, Nationalist Forces by Alejandro de Quesada (Osprey Publishing, 2014, ISBN 9781782007821)
- "The Romanian Legionary's Mission in Spain" (Part III, A., xi Romania, 116.) in Fascism (Oxford Readers) edited by Roger Griffin (Oxford University Press, 1995, ISBN 0-19-289249-5).
- Biographical Dictionary of the Extreme Right Since 1890 by Philip Rees (Simon & Schuster, 1991, ISBN 0-13-089301-3).
- William Totok: „Meister des Todes. Über die Wiederbelebungsversuche des Kultes von Moţa und Marin / Maeştrii morţii. Despre încercarea de reînviere a cultului Moţa şi Marin“, in: Apoziţia, München, 2007, pp. 396–422.
