= Alexandru Cantacuzino =

Alexandru Cantacuzino may refer to:

- Alexandru Cantacuzino (militant) (1901–1939), a 20th-century Romanian politician and member of the Iron Guard
- Alexandru Cantacuzino (minister) (1811–1884), a 19th-century Romanian politician, Minister of Foreign Affairs and Minister of Finance
