= Nicholas Nagy-Talavera =

Nicholas M. Nagy-Talavera
- Born: February 1, 1929; Budapest, Hungary
- Died: January 23, 2000 (aged 70); Chico, California
- Education: University of Vienna; University of California, Berkeley
- Employer: California State University, Chico

Nicholas M. Nagy-Talavera or Miklós Nagy (February 1, 1929 – January 23, 2000) was a Hungarian-American dissident, historian, writer and professor.

== Biography ==
He was born to prosperous merchants of Sephardic Jewish descent and spent his childhood in Oradea, Romania. In 1944, when he was 14 years old, Nagy-Talavera was arrested by Hungarian police and handed over to German authorities, who transported him to Auschwitz concentration camp, where he encountered the notorious Josef Mengele. He survived Auschwitz and returned to Budapest in 1945 to find that his parents had also survived the war by hiding with Christian friends.

In 1948 Nagy-Talavera enrolled at the University of Vienna. Because of his dissident activities, he fell afoul of SMERSH, the Red Army's counter-intelligence branch. Arrested, convicted of espionage, and sentenced to 25 years of slave labor, he spent the next seven years in the USSR's gulag system. He was released in late 1955, and returned to Budapest in time to participate in the Hungarian Revolution of 1956. When the revolution failed he fled to Vienna, and thence to the United States.

Nagy-Talavera completed his Bachelor of Arts and Ph.D. degrees at the University of California, Berkeley. He taught Russian and Eastern European History at California State University, Chico from 1967 until his retirement in 1991.

Nagy-Talavera was the author of many articles and books including on Nicolae Iorga (Nicolae Iorga: A Biography) and the Arrow Cross and the Iron Guard (The Green Shirts and the Others: A History of Fascism in Hungary and Romania). He was just a child when he met Corneliu Zelea Codreanu, the leader of the Iron Guard.
