= Iron Guard =

Romanian fascist movement and political party

- Garda de Fier
- Leaders: Corneliu Zelea Codreanu (executed); Horia Sima
- Founded: 24 June 1927; 99 years ago
- Split from: National-Christian Defense League
- Headquarters: Green House, Bucureștii Noi
- Ideology: Legionarism (Note: The clerical fascist Iron Guard synthesized Orthodox christianity with revolutionary nationalism and were heavily inspired by the writings of Nichifor Crainic.); Ultranationalism (Note: The Iron Guard articulated a distinctive variant of ultranationalism that integrated transcendental and explicitly religious dimensions. This ideological framework, often characterized as "thanatic nationalism", manifested itself through ritualized political funerals, a cultivated veneration of the dead, and soteriological and martyrological motifs drawn from Orthodox Christian tradition. At its core was a redemptive political theology grounded in the principle of "self-sacrificial patriotism". By employing funerary rites and commemorative ceremonies, the movement constructed a symbolic pantheon of political martyrs and advanced the Fascist ideal of the "new man" (Romanian: omul nou); in this case, an individual who sought spiritual "purification" as a means of bringing the entire nation into closer alignment with God.); Populism; Antisemitism (Note: The Romanian Iron Guard espoused anti-capitalist, anti-banking and anti-bourgeois rhetoric, combined with anti-communism and a religious form of antisemitism. The Iron Guard saw both capitalism and communism as being Jewish creations that served to divide the nation, and accused Jews of being "the enemies of the Christian nation".)
- Political position: Far-right
- Size: 272,000 (late 1937 est.)
- Part of: ABN (from 1943); WLFD (post-war)

Everything for the Country Totul pentru Țară
- President: Gheorghe Cantacuzino (Note: (1934–1937)); Gheorghe Clime (Note: (1937–1938)) (executed); Horia Sima (Note: (1938–1941))
- Founded: 10 December 1934; 91 years ago
- Registered: 20 March 1935; 91 years ago
- Banned: 23 January 1941; 85 years ago
- Preceded by: Corneliu Codreanu Group
- Newspaper: Pământul Strămoșesc
- Student wing: Centru Studențesc Legionar
- Youth wing: Frățiile de Cruce
- Women's wing: Corpul Doamnelor Legionare
- Paramilitary wing: Iron Guard
- Welfare wing: Ajutorul Legionar
- Labour wing: Corpul Muncitoresc Legionar
- Colours: Green (customary)

Election symbol

The Iron Guard (Romanian: Garda de Fier) was a far-right, revolutionary, fascist paramilitary organization and political party active in the Kingdom of Romania during the interwar period and the Second World War. Founded in 1927 by Corneliu Zelea Codreanu as the Legion of the Archangel Michael (Legiunea Arhanghelul Mihail) or the Legionary Movement (Mișcarea Legionară), the movement was strongly anti-democratic, anti-communist, and antisemitic, and its ideology inspired both political violence and forms of Christian terrorism. It differed from other European far-right movements of the period due to its spiritual basis, as the Iron Guard was deeply imbued with Romanian Orthodox Christian mysticism.

In March 1930, Codreanu formed the Iron Guard as a paramilitary branch of the Legion, which in 1935 changed its official name to the "Totul pentru Țară" party—literally, "Everything for the Country". It existed into the early part of the Second World War, during which time it came to power. Members were called Legionnaires or, outside of the movement, "Greenshirts" because of the predominantly green uniforms they wore.

When Marshal Ion Antonescu came to power in September 1940, he brought the Iron Guard into the government, creating the National Legionary State. In January 1941, following the Legionnaires' rebellion, Antonescu used the army to suppress the movement, destroying the organization; its commander, Horia Sima, along with other leaders, escaped to Germany.

== Name ==
The "Legion of the Archangel Michael" (Romanian: Legiunea Arhangelul Mihail) was founded by Corneliu Zelea Codreanu on 24 June 1927 and led by him until his assassination in 1938. Despite various changes of the (intermittently banned) organization's name, members of the movement were widely referred to as "legionnaires" (sometimes "legionaries"; Romanian: legionarii) and the organization as the "Legion" or the "Legionary Movement".

In March 1930, Codreanu formed the "Iron Guard" (Romanian: Garda de Fier) as a paramilitary political branch of the Legion; this name eventually came to refer to the Legion itself. From June 1935 onwards, the organization used the name "Totul pentru Țară", literally meaning "Everything for the Country", in electoral contexts.

== History ==
=== Founding and rise ===
In 1927, Corneliu Zelea Codreanu left the number two position (under A.C. Cuza) in the Romanian political party known as the National-Christian Defense League (Liga Apărării Național Creștine, LANC), and founded the Legion of the Archangel Michael along with Corneliu Georgescu, Teodosie Popescu, Ion I. Moța, Radu Mironovici, and Ilie Gârneață.

The Legion differed from other fascist movements in that it had its mass base among the peasantry and students, rather than amongst military veterans. However, the legionnaires shared the general fascist "respect for the war veterans". Romania had a very large intelligentsia relative to the general population with 2.0 university students per one thousand of the population compared to 1.7 per one thousand of the population in far wealthier Germany, while Bucharest had more lawyers in the 1930s than did the much larger city of Paris. Even before the worldwide Great Depression, Romanian universities were producing far more graduates than the number of available jobs and the Great Depression in Romania had further drastically limited the opportunities for employment by the intelligentsia, who turned to the Iron Guard out of frustration. Many Orthodox Romanians, having obtained a university degree, which they expected to be their ticket to the middle class, were enraged to find that the jobs they were hoping for did not exist, and came to embrace the Legion's message that it was the Jews who were blocking them from finding the middle-class employment they wanted.

Beyond that, Romania had traditionally been dominated by a Francophile elite, who preferred to speak French over Romanian in private and who claimed that their policies were leading Romania to the West with the National Liberal Party, in particular, maintaining that their economic policies were going to industrialize Romania. The national Great Depression seemed to show the literal bankruptcy of these policies and many of the younger Romanian intelligentsia, especially university students, were attracted by the Iron Guard's glorification of "Romanian genius" and its leaders who boasted that they were proud to speak Romanian. The Romanian-born Israeli historian Jean Ancel wrote that from the mid-19th century onward, that Romanian intelligentsia had a "schizophrenic attitude towards the West and its values".

Romania had been a strongly Francophile country since 1859, when the United Principalities came into being, giving Romania effective independence from the Ottoman Empire (an event largely made possible by French diplomacy, which pressured the Ottomans on behalf of the Romanians). From that time onward, most of the Romanian intelligentsia professed themselves believers in French ideas about the universal appeal of democracy, freedom, and human rights, while at the same time holding antisemitic views about Romania's Jewish minority. Despite their antisemitism, most of the Romanian intelligentsia believed that France was not only Romania's "Latin sister", but also a "big Latin sister" that would guide its "little Latin sister" Romania along the correct path. Ancel wrote that Codreanu was the first significant Romanian to reject not only the prevailing Francophilia of the intelligentsia, but also the entire framework of universal democratic values, which Codreanu claimed were "Jewish inventions" designed to destroy Romania.

In contrast to the traditional idea that Romania would follow the path of its "Latin sister", France, Codreanu promoted a xenophobic, exclusive ultra-nationalism, in which Romania would follow its own path and reject French ideas about universal values and human rights. In a marked departure from the traditional ideas held by the elite about making Romania into the modernized and Westernized "France of Eastern Europe", the Legion demanded a return to the traditional Eastern Orthodox values of the past. It glorified Romania's peasant culture and folk customs as the living embodiment of "Romanian genius". This pivot away from France was also motivated by Germanophilia.

The leaders of the Iron Guard often wore traditional peasant costumes, with crucifixes and bags of Romanian soil around their necks, to emphasise their commitment to authentic Romanian folk values, in marked contrast to Romania's Francophile elite, who preferred the style of the latest fashions. The fact that many members of Romania's elite were often corrupt and that very little of the vast sums of money generated by Romania's oil found its way into the pockets of ordinary people further enhanced the appeal of the Legion, which denounced the entire elite as irredeemably corrupt.

Under Codreanu's charismatic leadership, the Legion was known for skillful propaganda, including a deft use of spectacle. Utilizing marches, religious processions, patriotic and partisan hymns and anthems, along with volunteer work and charitable campaigns in rural areas, the League presented itself as an alternative to corrupt parties in support of anti-communism. Initially, the Iron Guard hoped to encompass any political faction, regardless of its position on the political spectrum, that wished to combat the rise of communism in the USSR.

The Iron Guard was purposely antisemitic, promoting the idea that "Rabbinical aggression against the Christian world"—which manifested through Freemasonry, Freudianism, homosexuality, atheism, Marxism, Bolshevism, and the civil war in Spain"—were undermining society.

The Vaida-Voevod government outlawed the Iron Guard in January 1931. On 10 December 1933, the Romanian Liberal Prime Minister Ion Duca banned the Iron Guard. After a brief period of arrests, beatings, torture and even killings (18 members of the Legionary Movement were killed by the police force), Iron Guard members retaliated on 29 December 1933, by assassinating Duca on the platform of Sinaia railway station.

The Iron Guard participated in the 1934 Montreux Fascist conference as an observer. From the outset, the conference was marred by serious conflicts between the participants. The Iron Guard, for example, stressed the need for race to be an integral component of fascism.

=== Struggle for power ===
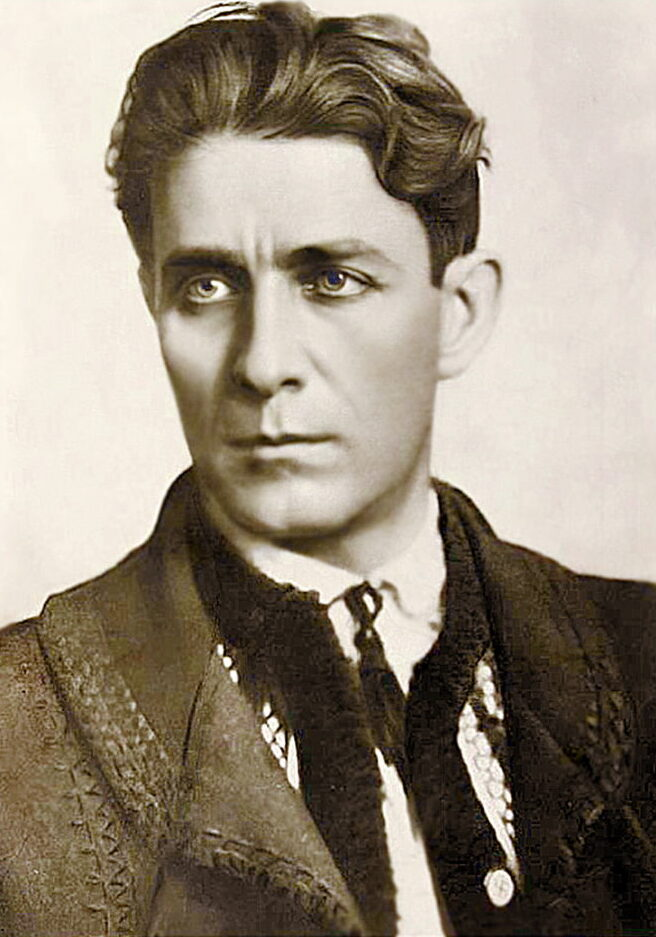
Corneliu Zelea Codreanu, the founder of the Iron Guard

In the 1937 parliamentary elections, the Legion came in third with 15.5% of the vote, behind the National Liberal and the National Peasant Parties. King Carol II strongly opposed the Legion's political aims and successfully kept them out of government until he himself was forced to abdicate in 1940. During this period, the Legion was generally on the receiving end of persecution. On 10 February 1938, the king dissolved the government and initiated a royal dictatorship.

Codreanu advised the Legion to accept the new regime. However, Interior Minister Armand Călinescu did not trust Codreanu and ordered him arrested on 16 April. Realizing that the government was looking for an excuse to have him executed, Codreanu ordered the Legion's acting commander, Horia Sima, to take no action unless there was evidence that he was in immediate danger. However, Sima, who was known for his violent streak, launched a wave of terrorist activity in the autumn. Codreanu got wind of this and ordered the violence to end.

The order came too late. On the night of 29–30 November 1938, Codreanu and several other legionnaires were strangled to death by their Gendarmerie escort, purportedly during an attempt to escape from prison. It is generally agreed that there was no such escape attempt, and that Codreanu and the others were killed on the king's orders, probably in reaction to the 24 November 1938 murder by legionnaires of a relative (some sources say a "friend") of Călinescu. In the aftermath of Carol's decision to crush the Iron Guard, many members of the Legion fled into exile in Germany, where they received both material and financial support from the NSDAP, especially from the SS and Alfred Rosenberg's Foreign Political Office.

For much of the interwar period, Romania was in the French sphere of influence, and in 1926, Romania signed a treaty of alliance with France. Following the Remilitarization of the Rhineland in March 1936, Carol began to move away from the traditional alliance with France, as the fear grew in Romania that the French would do nothing in the event of German aggression in Eastern Europe. However, Carol's regime was still regarded as essentially pro-French. From the German viewpoint, the Iron Guard was regarded as far preferable to King Carol. The royal dictatorship lasted just over one year. On 7 March 1939, a new government was formed with Călinescu as prime minister; on 21 September 1939, he, in turn was assassinated by legionnaires avenging Codreanu. Călinescu favored a foreign policy where Romania would maintain a pro-Allied neutrality in World War II, and as such, the SS had a hand in organizing Călinescu's assassination. Further rounds of mutual carnage ensued, with the government massacring over 300 Legionnaires nationwide in reprisal.

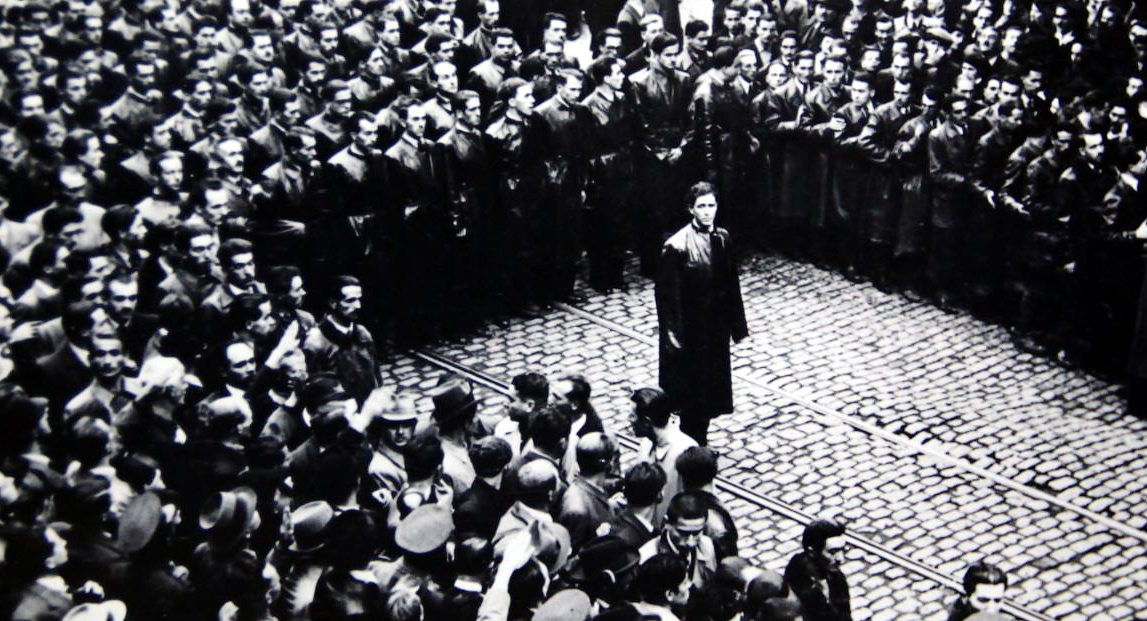
Corneliu Zelea Codreanu and Iron Guard members in 1937

In addition to the conflict with the king, an internal power struggle ensued in the wake of Codreanu's death. Waves of repression almost eliminated the Legion's original leadership by 1939, promoting second-rank members to the forefront. According to a secret report filed by the Hungarian political secretary in Bucharest in late 1940, three main factions existed: the group gathered around Sima, a dynamic local leader from the Banat, which was the most pragmatic and least Orthodox in its orientation; the group composed of Codreanu's father, Ion Zelea Codreanu, and his brothers (who despised Sima); and the Moța-Marin group, which wanted to strengthen the movement's religious character.

After a long period of confusion, Sima, representing the Legion's less radical wing, overcame all competition and assumed leadership, being recognised as such on 6 September 1940 by the Legionary Forum, a body created at his initiative. On 28 September, the elder Codreanu stormed the Legion headquarters in Bucharest (the Green House) in an unsuccessful attempt to install himself as leader. Sima was close to SS Volksgruppenführer Andreas Schmidt, a volksdeutsch (ethnic German) from Romania, and through him become close to Schmidt's father-in-law, the powerful Gottlob Berger who headed the SS Main Office in Berlin. The British historian Rebecca Haynes has argued that financial and organizational support from the SS was an essential factor in Sima's rise.

=== Sima's ascendancy ===
In the first months of World War II, Romania was officially neutral. However, the Molotov–Ribbentrop Pact of 23 August 1939, initially a secret document, stipulated, among other things, Soviet interest in Bessarabia. After the invasion of Poland by Nazi Germany on 1 September, joined by the Soviet Union on 17 September, Romania granted refuge to members of Poland's fleeing government and military. Even after the assassination of Călinescu on 21 September, King Carol tried to maintain neutrality. Still, the later French surrender to Germany and the British retreat from Europe rendered them unable to fulfil their assurances to Romania.

This political alignment was obviously favourable to the surviving legionnaires, and became even more so after France fell in May 1940. Sima and several other legionnaires who had taken refuge in Germany began slipping back into Romania. A month after the fall of France, Carol restructured his regime's single party, the National Renaissance Front, into the more overtly totalitarian "Party of the Nation", and invited several legionnaires to join the restructured government. On 4 July, Sima and two other leading legionnaires joined the government of Ion Gigurtu. However, they resigned after only a month due to mounting pressure to have Carol abdicate.

The Second Vienna Award, which forced Romania to cede much of northern Transylvania to Hungary, angered Romanians of all political shades and all but destroyed Carol politically. Despite this, a legionnaire coup on 3 September failed.

=== Rise to power ===
More or less out of desperation, King Carol II named General (later Marshal) Ion Antonescu as prime minister, partly because of the general's close ties with the Legion. Unknown to Carol, however, Antonescu had secretly reached an agreement with other political figures to force out the king. Amid widespread outrage at the Second Vienna Award, Carol's position became untenable. He was forced to abdicate in favour of his son Michael, who quickly confirmed Antonescu's dictatorial powers and granted him the title of Conducător (leader) of Romania.

Although Antonescu was an arch-nationalist and authoritarian, his first preference was to form a government of national unity, in which all parties would have accepted him as dictator. However, with the exception of the Legion, the other parties at least wanted to maintain the appearance of parliamentary rule. The Legion, in contrast, fully supported Antonescu's vision of an ultranationalist and authoritarian regime. With this in mind, Antonescu formed an alliance with the Legion on 15 September. As part of the deal, Romania was proclaimed a "National Legionary State", with the Legion as the country's only legal party. Antonescu became the Legion's honorary leader. Sima became deputy premier, and four other legionnaires joined Sima in the cabinet. The Iron Guard was the only Fascist movement outside Germany and Italy to come to power without foreign assistance.

Once in power, from 14 September 1940 until 21 January 1941, the Legion ratcheted up the level of already harsh antisemitic legislation and pursued, with impunity, a campaign of pogroms and political assassinations. On 27 November 1940 more than 60 former dignitaries or officials were executed in Jilava prison while awaiting trial. The following day, historian and former prime minister Nicolae Iorga and economic theorist Virgil Madgearu were assassinated; assassination attempts were made on former prime ministers and Carol supporters Constantin Argetoianu, Guță Tătărescu and Ion Gigurtu, but they were freed from the hands of the Legionary police and put under military protection.

=== Failure and destruction ===
Once in power, Sima and Antonescu quarreled bitterly. According to historian Stanley G. Payne, Antonescu intended to create a situation analogous to that of Francisco Franco's regime in Spain, in which the Legion would be subordinated to the state. He demanded that Sima cede overall leadership of the Legion to him, but Sima refused.

Sima demanded that the government follow the 'legionary spirit', and all major offices be held by legionaries. Other groups were to be dissolved. Economic policy, said Sima, should be coordinated closely with Germany. Antonescu rejected Sima's demands and was alarmed by the Iron Guard's death squads. He decided to bide his time until he had a chance to destroy the Legion once and for all. On 14 January 1941, after securing approval in person from Hitler, and with the support of the Romanian army and other political leaders, Antonescu moved in. The Guard started a last-ditch coup attempt but in a three-day civil war, Antonescu won decisively with support from the Romanian and German armies. During the run-up to the coup attempt, different factions of the German government backed different sides in Romania with the SS supporting the Iron Guard while the military and the Auswärtiges Amt supported General Antonescu. Baron Otto von Bolschwing of the SS who was stationed at the German embassy in Bucharest played a major role in smuggling arms for the Iron Guard.

During the crisis, members of the Iron Guard instigated a deadly pogrom in Bucharest. Particularly gruesome was the murder of dozens of Jewish civilians in the Bucharest slaughterhouse. The perpetrators hanged the Jews from meat hooks, then mutilated and killed them in a vicious parody of kosher slaughtering practices. The American ambassador to Romania Franklin Mott Gunther who toured the meat-packing plant where the Jews were slaughtered with the placards reading "Kosher meat" on them reported back to Washington: "Sixty Jewish corpses were discovered on the hooks used for carcasses. They were all skinned ... and the quantity of blood about was evidence that they had been skinned alive". Gunther wrote he was especially shocked that one of the Jewish victims hanging on the meat hooks was a 5-year-old girl. Sima and other legionnaires were helped by the Germans to escape to Germany.

During the rebellion and pogrom, the Iron Guard killed 125 Jews, while 30 soldiers died in the confrontation with the rebels. Following it, the Iron Guard movement was banned and 9,000 of its members were imprisoned. On 22 June 1941, the Iron Guards imprisoned in Iași since January by the Antonescu regime were released from prison and organized and armed by the police as part of the preparations for the Iași pogrom. When it came to killing Jews, the Antonescu regime and the Iron Guard were capable of finding common ground despite the failed coup in January 1941; Antonescu was as virulently antisemitic as the Guard. When the pogrom began in Iași on 27 June 1941, the Iron Guards armed with crow-bars and knives played a prominent role in leading the mobs that slaughtered Jews on the streets of Iași in one of the bloodiest pogroms ever in Europe.

=== Post-war era ===
Between 1944 and 1947 Romania had a coalition government in which the Communists played a leading, but not yet dominant role. Journalist Edward Behr claimed that in early 1947, a secret agreement was signed by the leaders of the exiled Iron Guard in displaced persons (DP) camps in Germany and Austria and the Romanian Communist Party, under which all of the Legionnaires in the DP camps, except for those accused of the murder of Communists, could return home to Romania; in exchange, Legionnaires would work as thugs to terrorize the anti-communist opposition as part of a plan for the ultimate communist takeover of Romania. Behr further claimed that in the months after the "non-aggression pact" between the Communists and the Legion, thousands of Legionnaires returned to Romania, where they played a prominent role working for the Interior Ministry in breaking opposition to the emerging socialist government.

Following the end of World War II, some Iron Guardist movements composed of former members of the Legion emerged in émigré communities outside Romania, such as the Legion of St. Michael and the Romanian Freedom Front. Several leading Legionnaires and their associates, including Horia Sima, Constantin Papanace, and Gârneață, among others, continued to live in exile and organize politically long after the war. Under Sima's leadership and with NATO funding, Legionnaires were covertly parachuted into Romania in 1949 to overthrow the communist government. Related anti-communist resistance groups also received funding from the Central Intelligence Agency, and sections of the Legionary Movement received further support from Vatican officials. By the 1950s, groups of exiled Legionnaires had formed a network of political, cultural, and "religious" organizations in Spain, France, Italy, Germany, Austria, Canada, the United States, and South America. Through these organizations, they continued to publish Legionary, anti-communist, or ultra-nationalist literature; they also forged connections with other ultra-nationalist or fascist movements and attempted to recruit new members. With funding from supporters, a monument was erected to Ion Moța and Vasile Marin in Majadahonda, Spain in the mid-1970s.

Evidence from the Vatican archives indicates that, following the end of World War II, the Congregation for the Eastern Churches, led by Cardinal Eugène Tisserant and assisted by Greek Catholic clergy, provided humanitarian aid to several members of the Iron Guard outside of the official displaced persons camps. Between 1945 and 1946, some of these individuals were sheltered near the General House of the Religious of Saint Vincent de Paul, located at Via Palestro 29 in Rome. In the years 1947–1948, Vatican relief officials, including Krunoslav Draganović, facilitated the migration of some members of this group from Italy and Europe. Among them, Ilie Gârneață and several associates reportedly converted to Catholicism, in the hope that the Vatican would grant them positions within its relief apparatus and support their political aspirations.

== Electoral history ==
At the 1927 and the 1931 elections the movement stood for the Chamber of Deputies as Legion of the Archangel Michael. In the 1932 it stood as the Codreanu Group, winning five of the 387 seats. It did not compete in the 1928 election and was banned in 1933. At the 1937 election it stood as Everything for the Country Party, winning 66 of the 387 seats. At the 1939 election, all opposition parties were banned.

Election	Votes	Percentage	Assembly	Senate	Position	Aftermath
1927	10,761	0.4%	0 / 387	0 / 113	8th	Extra-parliamentary opposition to PNL government (1927–1928)
1928	did not compete		0 / 387	0 / 110	–	Extra-parliamentary opposition to PNȚ government (1928–1931)
1928	did not compete		0 / 387	0 / 110	–	Extra-parliamentary opposition to PND minority government (1931)
1931	30,783	1.1%	0 / 387	0 / 113	12th	Extra-parliamentary opposition to PND minority government (1931–1932)
1931	30,783	1.1%	0 / 387	0 / 113	12th	Extra-parliamentary opposition to PNȚ government (1932)
1932	70,674	2.4%	5 / 387	0 / 113	9th	Opposition to PNȚ government (1932–1933)
1933	party banned		0 / 387	0 / 108	–	Extra-parliamentary opposition to PNL government (1933–1937)
1937	478,378	15.8%	66 / 387	4 / 113	3rd (as TpȚ)	Supporting PNC minority government (1937–1938)
parliament suspended						Extra-parliamentary opposition to Miron Cristea's monarchist government (1938–1939)
1939	party banned		0 / 258	0 / 88	–	Extra-parliamentary opposition to FRN monarchist government (1939–1940)
parliament suspended						LAM fascist government (1940–1941)

== Description ==
=== Ideology ===
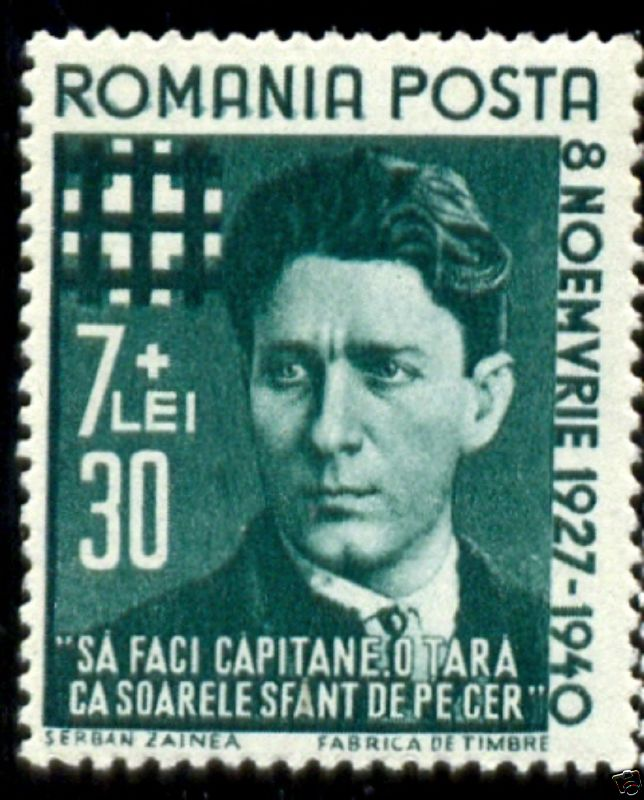
1940 stamp bearing the symbol of the Iron Guard over a white cross that stood for one of its humanitarian ventures.

Historian Stanley G. Payne writes in his study of fascism, "The Legion was arguably the most unusual mass movement of interwar Europe." It was distinguished among other contemporaneous European fascist movements with respect to its understanding of nationalism, which was indelibly tied to religion. According to Ioanid Radu, the Legion "willingly inserted strong elements of Orthodox Christianity into its political ideology to the point of becoming one of the rare modern European political movements with a religious ideological structure."

The movement's leader, Corneliu Zelea Codreanu, was a religious nationalist who aimed at a spiritual resurrection for the nation, writing the movement was a "spiritual school...[which] strikes to transform and revolutionise the Romanian soul." According to Codreanu's philosophy, human life was a sinful, violent political war, which the spiritual nation would ultimately transcend. In this schema, the Legionnaire might have to perform actions beyond the simple will to fight, suppressing the preservation instinct for the sake of the country.

Like many other fascist movements, the Legion called for a revolutionary "new man". However, this was not defined in physical terms, as with the Nazis, but was aimed at recreating and purifying oneself to bring the whole nation closer to God.

One of the qualities of this new man was selflessness. Codreanu wrote "When a politician enters a party, the first question that he puts is 'what can I gain from this?...when a legionary enters the Legion, he says 'For myself I want nothing'".

The Legion lacked a well-developed and consistent economic policy, though it generally promoted the idea of a communal or national economy, rejecting capitalism as overly materialistic.

The movement considered its main enemies to be the present political leadership and the Jews.

==== Political position ====
Rejecting accusations of right-wing extremism, Vasile Marin argued that the Iron Guard represented a modern, socially conscious, and fundamentally revolutionary alternative to Romania's nineteenth-century liberal "oligarchy", which he characterized as unjust, obsolete, and hostile to the working classes. Drawing on Italian Fascism, National Socialism, and the corporatist, left-leaning thought of Georges Valois, Marin claimed that the Legion belonged not to the conservative right but to the revolutionary left, emphasizing its rejection of social conservatism and its belief in the "organized masses" as agents of national renewal. He reinforced this argument by condemning classical liberalism for privileging individual and class interests, repressing workers, and reducing the state to a bourgeois instrument, as evidenced by the violent suppression of the 1929 miners' strike and the 1933 railway workers' revolt. In place of the "imported", universalist liberal state, Marin demanded a modern, collectivist, "totalitarian" national state capable of enforcing the collective interest and reorganizing society into a unified corporatist order. This vision entailed dismantling Romania's historic, plural, and flexible social ties in order to impose a militarized national community purified of perceived political and "racial" undesirables, a project the Legion justified as a modern response to economic complexity and the subordination of individuals to the collective in contemporary industrial society.

Strongly influenced by Oswald Spengler, Marin further argued that genuine political modernity required a "cultural state" rooted in national particularism, in contrast to what he saw as the impersonal, civilizational—and therefore decaying—character of liberalism and Soviet communism. He regarded Romania's "minor" peasant culture as evidence of historical marginality and envisioned the population—villagers included—as raw material to be transformed into a modern, culturally revitalized nation by a disciplined Legionary elite.

"We have to make sure that the entire Romania becomes Legionnaire. The new Legionnaire spirit must reign. The whole country must be ruled according to the will of the Legionnaires."

— Corneliu Zelea Codreanu (Cărticica şefului de cuib. Point 43.)

Seeing fascist corporatism and Leninist collectivism as rival modernizing projects, Marin believed that fascism offered the superior model because it harmonized national interests rather than subordinating them to class conflict. Even Soviet industrial "civilization", he contended, had degenerated into a sterile, deracinated modernity once its revolutionary impulse had been "hijacked", though he observed in the 1930s a mutual convergence between fascism becoming more socialist and Stalinism becoming more national. Taken together, these claims framed the Iron Guard as a radical, modernizing movement that sought not to preserve Romanian tradition, but to reconstruct the nation—biologically, culturally, and politically—through a "totalitarian" revolutionary project.

==== Economics ====
The Iron Guard's economic outlook blended nationalist and spiritual themes with selective, loosely defined "socialist" elements, though these claims were often exaggerated or unreliable. Some members, such as organizer Andrei Ionescu, later asserted under Securitate interrogation that the movement embraced aspects of Marxism and promoted economic ideas aligned with social justice and anti-corruption. However, these statements were shaped by the political pressures of the communist era and conflict with the Legion's strong anti-communist stance. In practice, the Iron Guard's economics were less a coherent program and more an ideological tool, framed around moral renewal, discipline, and opposition to perceived corrupt elites, rather than a structured socialist or communist model.

=== Style ===
Members wore dark green uniforms, which symbolized renewal and led to them being occasionally referred to as "Greenshirts" (Cămășile verzi). Like fascist counterparts in Italy, Spain, and Germany, legionnaires greeted each other using the Roman salute.

The main symbol of the Iron Guard was a triple cross (a variant of the triple parted and fretted one), standing for prison bars (as a badge of martyrdom), (Unicode: U+2A69 ⩩ ) and sometimes referred to as the "Archangel Michael Cross" (Crucea Arhanghelului Mihail).

The Legion developed a cult of martyrdom and self-sacrifice, best exemplified by the action group, Echipa morții, or "Death Squad". Codreanu claimed the name was chosen because members were ready to accept death while campaigning for the organization. (Note: Members of the first "Death Squad" were: Ion Dumitrescu-Borșa (a Christian Orthodox priest), Sterie Ciumetti, Petre Țocu, Tache Savin, Traian Clime, Iosif Bozântan, Nicolae Constantinescu) A chapter of the Legion was called a cuib, or "nest", and was arranged around the virtues of discipline, work, silence, education, mutual aid, and honor.

==== Flag gallery ====

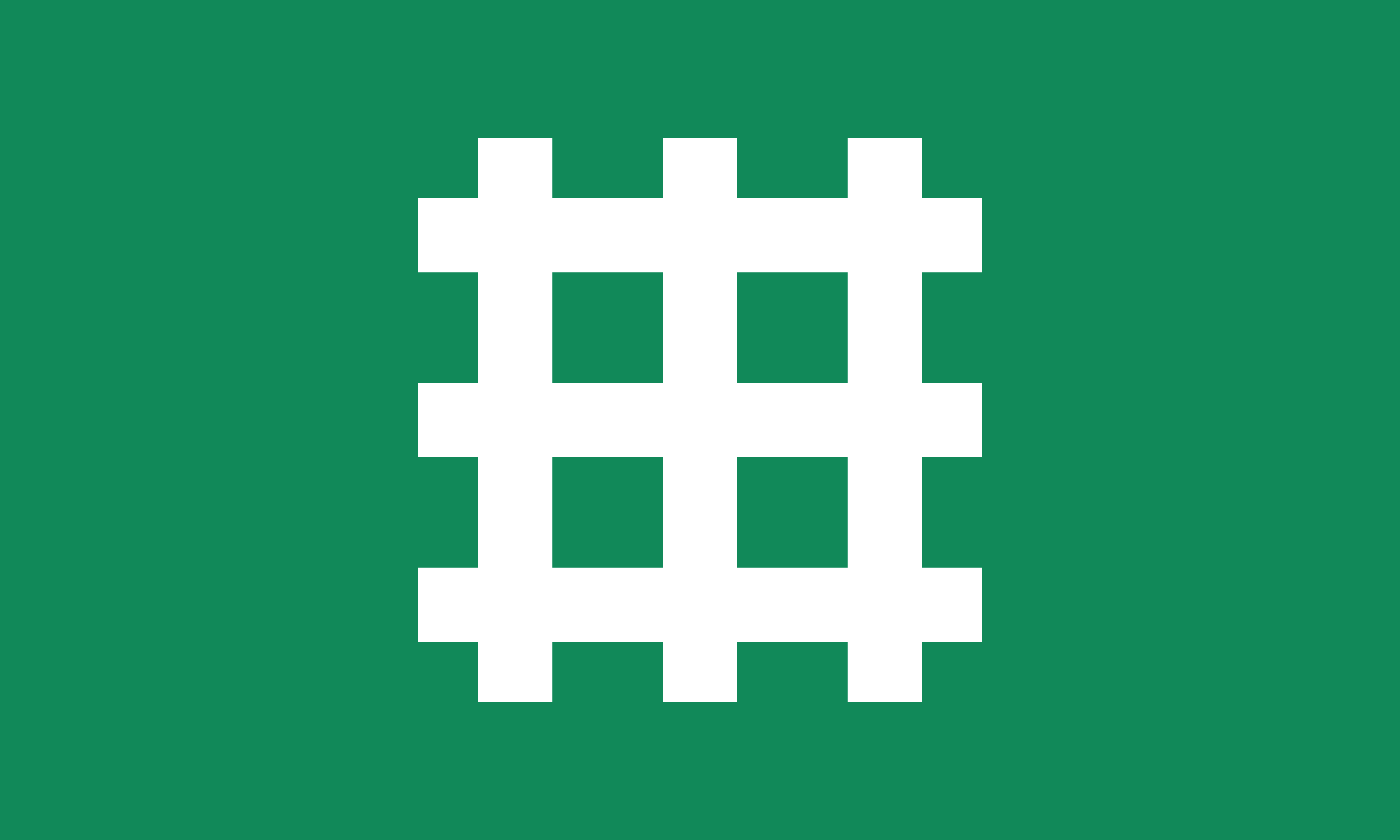

==== Hymns ====
- Imnul tinereții legionare
  (transl. 'The Hymn of Legionary Youth')
- Echipa morții
  (transl. 'The Team of Death')
- Șoim Român
  (transl. 'Romanian Falcon')
- Imnul eroilor Moța-Marin
  (transl. 'The Hymn of the Heroes Moța and Marin')
- Imnul biruinții
  (transl. 'The Hymn of Victory')
- Imnul muncitorilor
  (transl. 'The Hymn of the Workers')
- Imnul Legiunii Arhanghelul Mihail
  (transl. 'The Hymn of the Legion of the Archangel Michael')
- Cântec de luptă
  (transl. 'Battle Song')
- Cântecul legionarilor căzuți
  (transl. 'The Song of the Fallen Legionaries')
- Imnul echipei -Miti Dumitrescu-
  (transl. 'The Hymn of the Miti Dumitrescu Team')
- Cântecul Nicadorilor
  (transl. 'The Song of the Nicadors')
- Înainte
  (transl. 'Forward')
- Peste mormântul tău sfânt
  (transl. 'Over Your Holy Grave')
- Veniți cu noi
  (transl. 'Come With Us')
- Doina închisorilor
  (transl. 'The Prison Doina')
- Hora legionarilor
  (transl. 'The Legionaries' Hora')
- În crezul tău
  (transl. 'In Your Creed')
- De prin străinele meleaguri
  (transl. 'From Foreign Lands')
- Părintească dimândare
  (transl. 'Parental Pride')
- Urlă dușmanii
  (transl. 'The Enemies Howl')
- Ștefan Vodă (Marșul legionarilor Vrânceni)
  (transl. 'Stephen the Voivode (The March of the Legionaries of Vrancea'))
- Cu fruntea sus
  (transl. 'With Head Held High')
- Marșul legionarilor Tecuceni
  (transl. 'The March of the Legionaries of Tecuci')
- Doina Nicadorilor
  (transl. 'The Nicadors' Doina')
- Dealul negru
  (transl. 'The Black Hill')
- Ardealul tânăr legionar
  (transl. 'Young Legionary Transylvania')
- Răzbunare
  (transl. 'Revenge')
- Imnul românilor secuizați
  (transl. 'The Hymn of the Magyarized Romanians')
- Marșul legionarilor olteni
  (transl. 'The March of the Legionaries of Oltenia')
- Imnul eroilor legionari dela Majadahonda
  (transl. 'The Hymn of the Legionary Heroes from Majadahonda')
- Cântec de leagăn
  (transl. 'Lullaby')
- Înainte (după cântecul unui ofițer mort în 1917)
  (transl. 'Forward' (after the song of an officer killed in 1917))
- Imnul lagărelor
  (transl. 'The Hymn of the Camps')
- Chemarea jertfei
  (transl. 'The Call of Sacrifice')
- Marșul biruinții
  (transl. 'The March of Victory')
- Doina comandantului
  (transl. 'The Commander's Doina')
- Pornesc din neam
  (transl. 'I Come From the Lineage')

Octavian Racu argues that Imnul legionarilor căzuți (also known as "Cântecul legionarilor căzuți"), written by Simion Lefter and lamenting the death of Corneliu Zelea Codreanu, was actually adapted from Cossack folklore based on the verses of Ukrainian poet Mihailo Petrenko (1817–1862), with music composed by Vladislav Zaremba (1833–1902), of Polish origin.

=== Consultative body ===
The Legionary Senate was a consultative body of the Legionary Movement, created during the first national assembly of legionary nest leaders, which took place in Iași, at the home of General Ion Tarnoschi, between 3–4 January 1929. The Senate was established at the initiative of Corneliu Zelea Codreanu following his break with his former mentor, Professor A. C. Cuza. The Legionary Senate was conceived as both a counterweight and a type of supreme authority within the Legionary Movement, intended to give it an academic and moral aura.

The organizational instructions of the "Everything for the Fatherland" Party specified:

Members of the Legionary Senate are appointed from among prominent members, with or without camp experience or schooling, with or without seniority, whether or not they belong to a nest, members of any social category, whether intellectuals, workers, townspeople, peasants, boyars, răzeși, wealthy or poor...

— Mușat and Ardeleanu, 1988

In practice, the criteria for appointment diverged significantly from those stated by Codreanu. The senators he hurriedly named during the founding session, as well as those later co-opted, did not include "peasants or workers", were not evaluated regarding whether they "lived lives of great integrity, showed faith in the legionary future, and possessed wisdom", and did not meet the age requirement. Codreanu himself, who placed himself at the head of the Senate, was not yet 29 years old.

The first Legionary senators were Hristache Solomon, General Dr. Ion Macridescu, General Ion Tarnoschi, Spiru Peceli, Colonel Paul Cambureanu, and Ion Butnaru.

=== The Iron Guard and gender ===
According to a 1933 police report, 8% of the Iron Guard's members were women, while a 1938 report placed the figure at 11%. Part of the reason for the overwhelming male membership of the Iron Guard was that a disproportionate number of legionnaires were university students and very few women went to university in Romania during the inter-war period. In the Romanian language, plurals are attached to most nouns that have either a masculine or feminine form. Words in English that are gender-neutral, such as "youth" or "member", are used in Romanian to refer either to Romanian men or Romanian women, young men or young women, and male members or female members. The Iron Guard almost always used the masculine plural forms in their writings and speeches, which may perhaps suggest that they had a male audience in mind. However, in Romanian, like most languages, the masculine plural is also used for mixed-gender groups.

The Iron Guard explained that the problem of poverty in Romania was due to the Jews' ongoing colonization of Romania, which prevented Christian Romanians from getting ahead economically. The solution to this perceived problem was to drive the Jews out of Romania, which the Iron Guard claimed would finally allow Eastern Orthodox Romanians to rise to the middle class. The Iron Guard claimed that this Jewish colonization was due to most Romanian men lacking the masculine courage to protect their interests. The Iron Guard argued that Romanian men had been "emasculated" and were suffering from "sterility", which one Iron Guard, Alexandru Cantacuzino, called the "plague of the present" in a 1937 essay. Notably, the term Cantacuzino used was the masculine sterilitate rather than the feminine stearpă. The Iron Guards constantly spoke in viscerally sexualized rhetoric of the need to create a "new man" whose virility and strength would liberate Romanian men from their emasculation.

=== Armaments ===
As a paramilitary force, the Iron Guard had no shortage of firearms while in power. At the start of 1941, in Bucharest alone, the Legionnaires had 5,000 guns (rifles, revolvers and machine guns) as well as numerous hand grenades. Included in their small arms was the MP28/II submachine-gun supplied by Himmler's SD. The Legion also possessed a small, mostly symbolic armored force of four vehicles: two police armored cars and two Renault UE Chenillettes from the Malaxa factory. The Malaxa factory had been licence-producing these French armored vehicles since mid-1939, and aside from the two such machines, the factory also supplied the Legion with machine guns and rifles. For transport, the Legion possessed almost 200 trucks in Bucharest alone.

== Legacy ==
The name Garda de Fier is also used by a small nationalist group active in the post-communist Romania.

There are several contemporary far-right organizations in Romania, such as Totul pentru țară (Everything for the country), which existed until it was banned in 2015, and Noua Dreaptă (The New Right), the latter considering itself heir to the Iron Guard's political philosophy, including personality cult centered on Corneliu Codreanu; however, the group uses the Celtic cross, which is not associated with legionarism.

=== Legionary architecture ===
Through their summer work camps, the Legionnaires performed volunteer work involving the construction and reparation of roads, bridges, churches and schools in rural areas. One notable construction of the Iron Guard is the "Green House" (Casa Verde). Built in the Romanian architectural style, this building on the outskirts of 1930s Bucharest served as the Legion's headquarters and home to Codreanu. these camps intended to cultivate athleticism, discipline, sense of community and elimination of certain societal divisions. Horia Sima stated that the camps "destroyed class prejudice" by bringing together those from different classes. The attendees were not allowed to leave the camp except for emergencies and in their free time were to read literature. Following completion of camp time a diploma was received.

=== Public commemoration ===
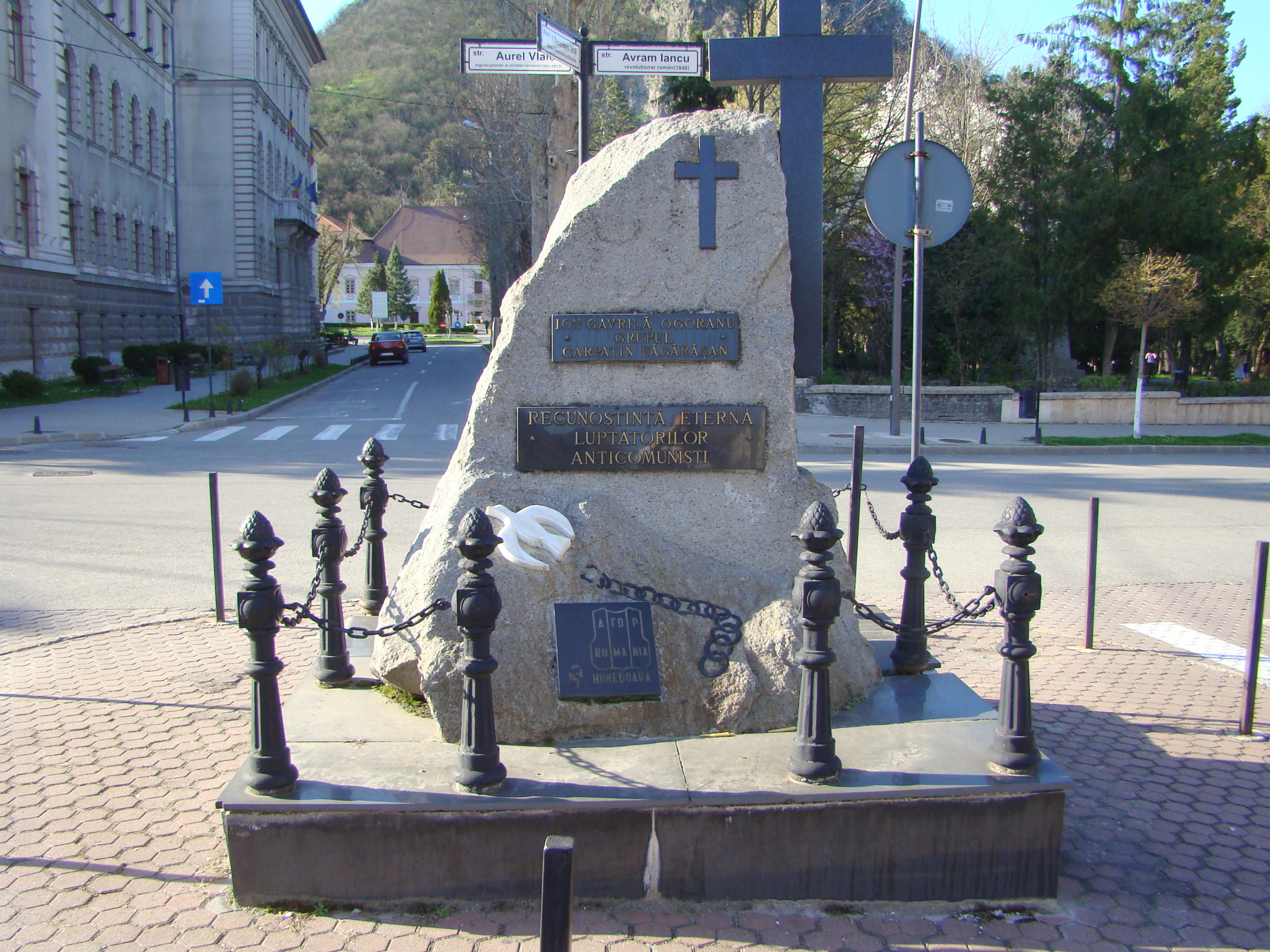
The "Monument of the anti-Communist fighters" in Deva, commemorating a member of the Iron Guard (Ion Gavrilă Ogoranu)

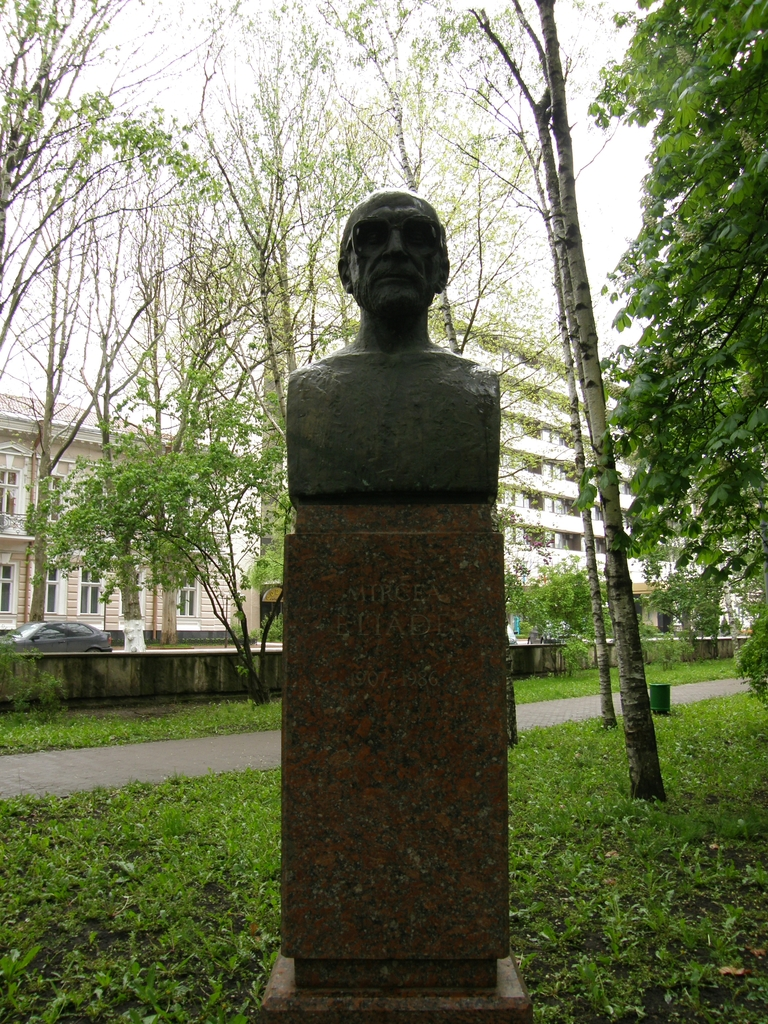
A bust of Mircea Eliade

The Iron Guard is currently commemorated in Romania and elsewhere through permanent public displays (monuments and street names) as well as public distinctions (such as posthumous honorary citizenship) dedicated to some of its members. A few such examples include:

- Corneliu Zelea Codreanu, the leader of the Iron Guard, has a roadside cross a few miles from Bucharest, near Buftea. It was built on the spot where he was executed in 1938. The site serves as a current destination for neo-Legionaries, who regularly gather there to commemorate Codreanu. Occasionally, members of right-wing extremist parties from outside Romania (such as Germany, Sweden and Italy) also attend these ceremonies. In 2012, the Elie Wiesel Institute notified the Romanian general prosecutor about the monument, claiming that two symbols displayed at the site – the logo of the Iron Guard and a photograph of Codreanu – were illegal. The prosecutor decided that the memorial did not violate the law, because Codreanu had not been convicted for crimes against peace or crimes against humanity, and because the symbols displayed are not propaganda. Finally, the prosecutor referred to a legal exception which stated that the public use of such symbols is allowed if it serves an educational, academic or artistic purpose. However, the prosecutor also established that the flagpole and fence did not have a construction permit, so they were removed. The cross itself was left in its place.
- Radu Gyr was a commander and ideologue of the Iron Guard who was convicted of war crimes. The Wiesel Institute requested the renaming of Radu Gyr Street in Cluj-Napoca. As of September 2025, the street had not been renamed.
- Valeriu Gafencu was a Legionary who was active during the Legionary Rebellion. He is now an honorary citizen of the town of Târgu Ocna.
- Ion Gavrilă Ogoranu was one of the main leaders of the Romanian anti-communist resistance movement, but prior to that he was a member of the Iron Guard. He now has a monument in his memory in Deva, as well as a foundation that bears his name. The neo-Legionary "Ion Gavrilă Ogoranu" Foundation is active in promoting the memory of the Iron Guard, such as when it organized a symposium dedicated to Gogu Puiu, a prominent Iron Guard leader, in January 2016. A motion-picture about Ogoranu's life, Portrait of the Fighter as a Young Man, was produced in 2010.
- Ion Moța and Vasile Marin were two Legionaries who were killed during the Spanish Civil War on 13 January 1937 while fighting on Franco's side. At Majadahonda, the site of their deaths, a monument was built in their honor.
- Mihail Manoilescu was an economist and politician, Governor of the National Bank of Romania between June and November 1931. In 1937, he joined the Iron Guard when he ran as a senator on the list of the Totul pentru Țară, an organization established by the Iron Guard. He succeeded in becoming senator following the election. His views corresponded to a large extent with the ideology of the Iron Guard. In 1948, he was detained at the Sighet Prison where he died in 1950. He never faced trial, and thus he was never convicted. On 14 April 2016, the National Bank of Romania issued a set of commemorative coins in the honor of three former bank governors. Manoilescu, who led the bank for several months in 1931, was among them. Manoilescu's inclusion drew strong protests from the Wiesel Institute, on the grounds of Manoilescu's advocacy of Fascist ideology and antisemitism before World War II. In spite of the criticism, the Bank did not withdraw the coin.
- Historian Mircea Eliade was perhaps the most well-known person to have been a member of the Iron Guard. As with Manoilescu, his membership was the result of his joining the Totul pentru Țară. Eliade is currently honored by various means, ranging from stamps to busts.
- Nicolae Paulescu, a Romanian physiologist and academic, most famous for his work on diabetes, including patenting pancreine (a pancreatic extract containing insulin), was an important antisemitic doctrinaire who was a member of the Legionary Senate. A hospital in Bucharest, is named after him and he is currently honored by various means, ranging from stamps to statues (including one outside the Carol Davila University of Medicine and Pharmacy).
- Ilarion Felea and Ilie Lăcătușu were members of the Iron Guard, the latter even an officer within its ranks ("legionary sector" leader). However, this did not prevent the Romanian Orthodox Church from canonizing the two as saints, despite protests from both within and outside Romania.

=== Iron Guard in other countries ===
The defunct American neo-Nazi Traditionalist Workers Party of the Nationalist Front took influence from Corneliu Zelia Codreanu for their ideology. The group's leader Matthew Heimbach (a Catholic convert to Orthodox Christianity) was photographed wearing a T-shirt promoting Codreanu and the Iron Guard's Archangel Michael's Cross symbol in the aftermath of the deadly Unite the Right rally in Charlottesville, Virginia. The Archangel Michael's Cross was among the symbols emblazoned on the firearms used by Brenton Tarrant during the 2019 Christchurch mosque shootings and by Payton S. Gendron during the 2022 Buffalo shooting.

During a 2018 interview with alt-right Mormon blogger Ayla Stewart, the Canadian white nationalist Faith Goldy recommended Codreanu's book For My Legionaries—which explicitly called for the extermination of the Jews—calling it "very, very, very, very spot on, given a lot of what the movement is talking about right now"; she later said she no longer endorsed the book.

The Iron Guard symbol was also spotted at Highlander Research and Education Center in New Market, Tennessee when the building was burned deliberately.

== See also ==
- Valerian Trifa

== Bibliography ==
- Chioveanu, Mihai. Faces of Fascism, by (University of Bucharest, 2005, Chapter 5: The Case of Romanian Fascism, ISBN 973-737-110-0).
- Coogan, Kevin (1999). Dreamer of the Day: Francis Parker Yockey and the Postwar Fascist International. Brooklyn: Autonomedia. ISBN 978-1-57027-039-0.
- Ioanid, Radu. "The Sacralised Politics of the Romanian Iron Guard," Totalitarian Movements & Political Religions, Volume 5, Number 3 (Winter 2004), pp. 419–453.
- Ioanid, Radu. The Sword of the Archangel, (Columbia University Press, 1990, ISBN 0-88033-189-5).
- Iordachi, Constantin. "Charisma, Religion, and Ideology: Romania's Interwar Legion of the Archangel Michael", in John R. Lampe, Mark Mazower (eds.), Ideologies and National Identities: The Case of Twentieth-century Southeastern Europe, Central European University Press, Budapest, 2004
- Mann, Michael (2004). Fascists. New York: Cambridge University Press. ISBN 0521538556.
- Nagy-Talavera, Nicholas M. The Green Shirts and the Others: A History of Fascism in Hungary and Rumania by (Hoover Institution Press, 1970).
- Ornea, Z. (1995). Anii treizeci. Extrema dreaptă românească [The Thirties: Romanian Far Right] (in Romanian). Bucharest: Fundației Culturale Române. ISBN 978-9-73915-543-4.
- Payne, Stanley G. Fascism: Comparison and Definition, pp. 115–118 (University of Wisconsin Press, 1980, ISBN 0-299-08060-9).
- Ronnett, Alexander E. The Legionary Movement Loyola University Press, 1974; second edition published as Romanian Nationalism: The Legionary Movement by Romanian-American National Congress, 1995, ISBN 0-8294-0232-2).
- Rubin, Barry M.; Rubin, Judith Colp (2015). Chronologies of Modern Terrorism. Armonk: Taylor and Francis. ISBN 978-1-31747-465-4.
- Volovici, Leon (1991). Nationalist Ideology and Antisemitism: The Case of Romanian Intellectuals in the 1930s. Oxford: Pergamon Press. ISBN 978-0-08041-024-1.
- Weber, Eugen. "Romania" in The European Right: A Historical Profile edited by Hans Rogger and Eugen Weber (University of California Press, 1965)
- Weber, Eugen. "The Men of the Archangel" in International Fascism: New Thoughts and Approaches edited by George L. Mosse (Sage Publications, 1979, ISBN 0-8039-9842-2, 0-8039-9843-0 [Pbk]).

=== Primary sources ===
- Fascism (Oxford Readers) edited by Roger Griffin, Part III, A., xi. "Romania", pp. 219–222 (Oxford University Press, 1995, ISBN 0-19-289249-5).
- The Suicide of Europe: Memoirs of Prince Michael Sturdza by Mihail R. Sturdza (American Opinion Books, 1968, ISBN 0-88279-214-8).

=== In German ===
- Heinen, Armin. Die Legion "Erzengel Michael" in Rumänien, (Munich: R. Oldenbourg Verlag, 1986, ISBN 978-3-486-53101-5) – one of the major historical contributions to the study of the Romanian Iron Guard.
- Totok, William. "Rechtsradikalismus und Revisionismus in Rumänien" (I–VII), in: Halbjahresschrift für südosteuropäische Geschichte Literatur und Politik, 13–16 (2001–2004).
