= Ion Moța =

Romanian far-right leader

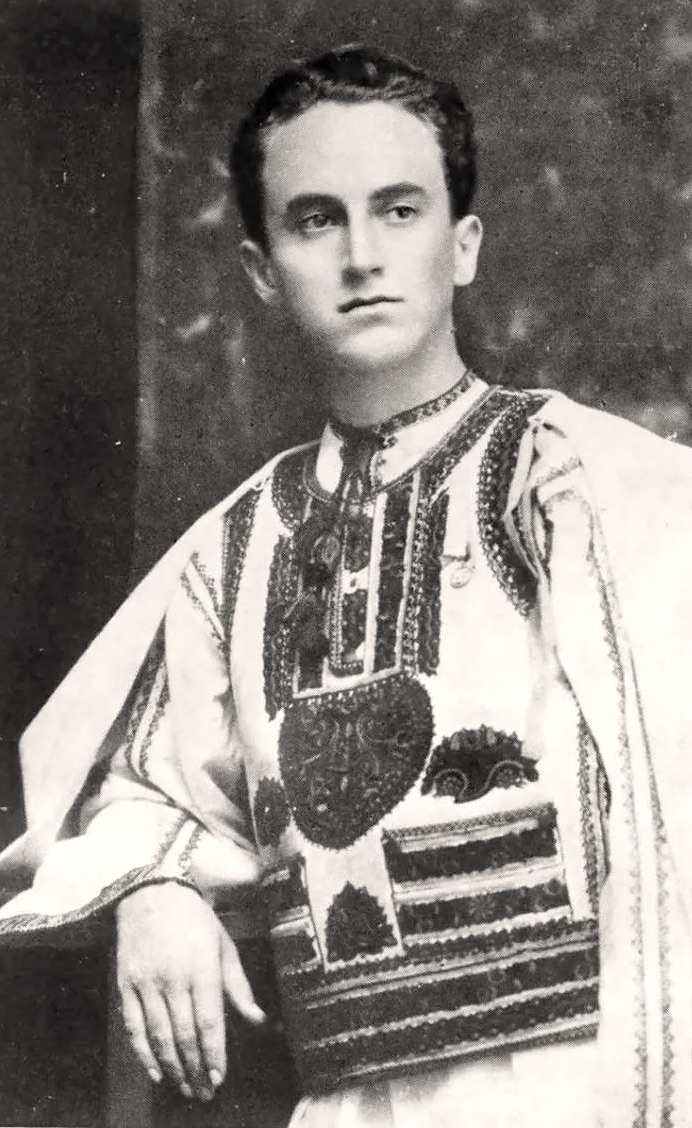
- Born: 5 July 1902; Orăștie, Austria-Hungary (present-day Romania)
- Died: 13 January 1937 (aged 34); Majadahonda, Spain
- Cause of death: Killed in action
- Occupation: Politician

Ion I. Moța (Note: Moța is sometimes referred to as Ionel Moța, to differentiate him from his father. "Moța" is occasionally spelled "Motza" in non-Romanian publications.) (5 July 1902 – 13 January 1937) was the deputy leader of the Romanian fascist Legionary Movement (Iron Guard), killed in battle during the Spanish Civil War.

== Biography ==
Son of the nationalist Orthodox priest Ioan Moța, who edited a journal called Libertatea ("Liberty"), Ion I. Moța completed his baccalaureate at Bucharest's Saint Sava National College, then studied law at the University of Paris (1920–1921), Cluj, and Iași. After being suspended from attending university in Romania, he returned to France. His thesis, finished in 1932 at the University of Grenoble, was entitled "Juridical Security in the Community of Nations", later published in Romania as "The League of Nations as a Vicious and Dangerous Ideal".

At Cluj, he founded Acțiunea Românească ("Romanian Action"), a nationalist group inspired by Charles Maurras' Action Française. This organization fused with A. C. Cuza's National-Christian Defense League in 1925. Moța met Corneliu Zelea Codreanu at a meeting of antisemitic students in August 1923.

In late 1923, Moța, Codreanu, and other ultranationalist students formed a plan to assassinate Romanian politicians and leaders of Romanian Jewry seen as traitors and corruptors of Romanian national life. They were arrested in Bucharest on 8 October 1923 and sent to Văcărești Prison. At the trial, Moța shot Aurelian Vernichescu, the member of their conspiracy who betrayed it to the authorities. Despite the shooting and a confession of guilt, the jury found the group not guilty and they were released on 29 March 1924. Moța spent two months in Galata prison in Iași for the murder of Vernichescu before being acquitted and released on 29 September 1924.

Codreanu made Moța leader of Frăția de Cruce ("Brotherhood of the Cross"), a fascist organization of peasants and students who would "fight for nationalistic renewal" (founded on 6 May 1924). Moța attended, together with A. C. Cuza, the September 1925 World Anti-Semitic Congress in Budapest; upon the founding of the Iron Guard (the Legion of the Archangel Michael) on 24 June 1927, he became deputy Captain to Codreanu.

Later that year, on 18 August 1927, he married Codreanu's sister, Iridenta. Together they had two children: Mihail and Gabriela.

Ion Moța represented the Legion at the 1934 Fascist International meeting in Montreux. He was vice-president of the Iron Guard political creation, the Everything for the Country Party. From 1934 through 1936, he served as a correspondent for Welt-Dienst ["World-Service"], an anti-Jewish publication founded by Ulrich Fleischhauer in Erfurt, Germany. Fleischhauer was a staunch believer in the veracity of the antisemitic propaganda pamphlet The Protocols of the Elders of Zion, and appeared as an "expert witness" for the pro-Nazis at the famous Berne Trial. Moța had previously translated The Protocols... into Romanian.

In late 1936, Moța formed a Legionary unit to fight against the Republican forces in the Spanish Civil War. He and Vasile Marin (another prominent Legionary) were killed on the Madrid Front on the same day of fighting (13 January 1937). Their funerals in Bucharest (13 February 1937) were an immense and orderly procession (see Funerals of Ion Moța and Vasile Marin), attended by the Ministers of Nazi Germany, Fascist Italy, and Francisco Franco's Spain, representatives of fascist Portugal, Japan (at the time in the early Shōwa period), and delegates of the Polish Patriotic Youth.

On the commemoration of the deaths of Moța and Marin on 13 January 1938, Codreanu created a special order in the ranks of the Legionary units: the Moța-Marin Corps under the direction of Alexandru Cantacuzino. The members of this elite corps had Ready to Die as their slogan.

A monument commemorating their deaths was erected at Majadahonda, on 13 September 1970, with the support of Franco's government.

== Gallery ==
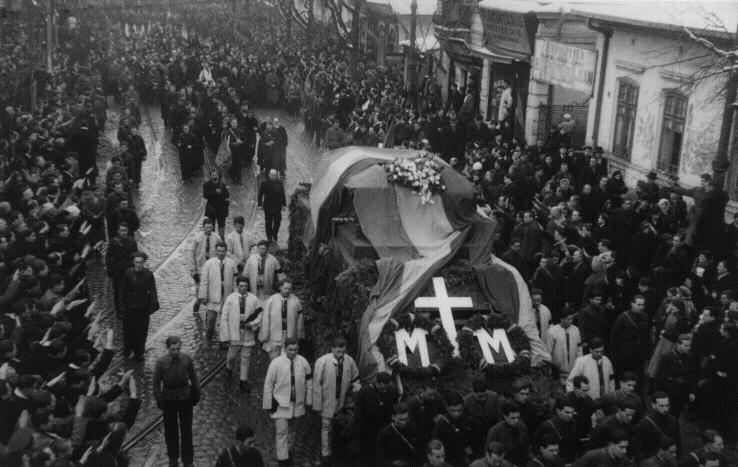
Funeral march for Ion Moța and Vasile Marin

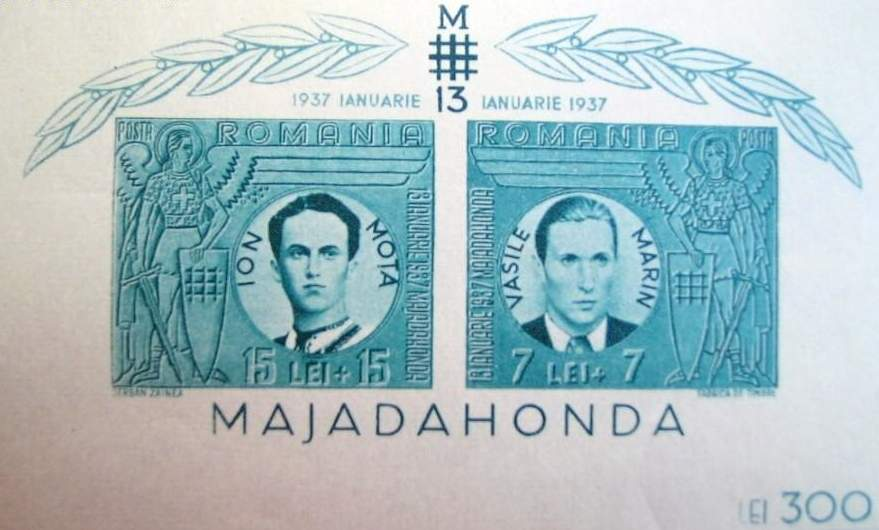
Romanian postage stamps from 1941

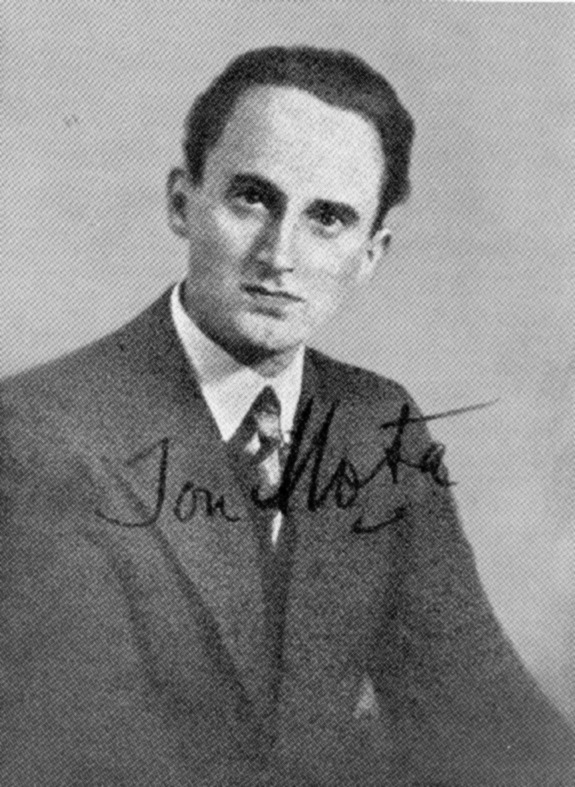
Photograph of Ion Moța
