= Ciocănești, Dâmbovița =

Ciocănești
- Commune
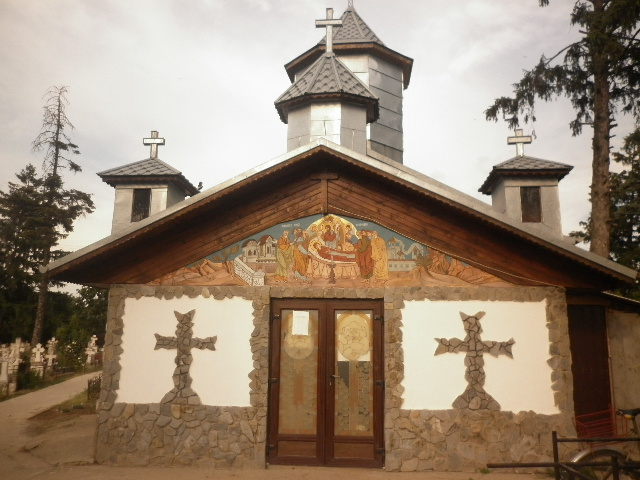
- Church of the Assumption of Virgin Mary in Ciocănești

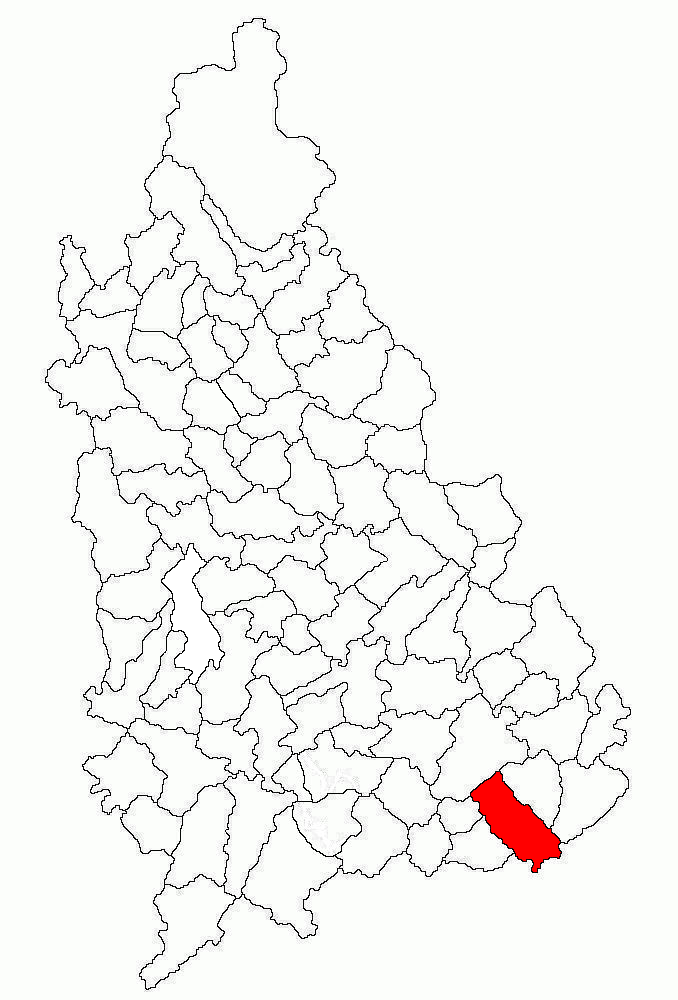
- Location in Dâmbovița County

- Location in Romania
- Coordinates: 44°36′N 25°51′E
- Country: Romania
- County: Dâmbovița

Government
  - Mayor (2020–2024): Ion-Ciprian Nilă (PNL)
- Area: 45.73 km^{2} (17.66 sq mi)
- Elevation: 115 m (377 ft)
- Population (2021-12-01): 5,286
  - Density: 115.6/km^{2} (299.4/sq mi)
- Time zone: UTC+02:00 (EET)
  - Summer (DST): UTC+03:00 (EEST)
- Postal code: 137090
- Area code: +(40) 245
- Vehicle reg.: DB
- Website: www.primariaciocanestidb.ro

Ciocănești is a commune in Dâmbovița County, Muntenia, Romania. It is composed of five villages: Ciocănești, Crețu, Decindea, Urziceanca, and Vizurești.

The commune lies in the middle of the Wallachian Plain, on the right bank of the Colentina River. It is located in the southeastern part of the county, on the border with Ilfov County, 30 km (19 mi) from downtown Bucharest, and 55 km (34 mi) from the county seat, Târgoviște.

Historical population
Year	Pop.	±%
2002	5,419	—
2011	5,571	+2.8%
2021	5,286	−5.1%
Source: Census data

== Natives ==
- Alexandrina Cantacuzino (1876–1944), political activist, philanthropist, and diplomat
- Alexandru Cantacuzino (1901–1939), lawyer and politician
