= Fascism (book) =

1995 book edited by Roger Griffin

- Cover of the first edition
- Editor: Roger Griffin
- Language: English
- Series: Oxford Readers
- Subject: Fascism
- Publisher: Oxford University Press
- Publication date: 1995
- Media type: Print (paperback)
- Pages: 410 (first edition)
- ISBN: 0-19-289249-5

Fascism is a book edited by political theorist Roger Griffin. It was published by Oxford University Press in 1995 as a 410-page paperback. It is a reader in the Oxford Readers series, which assembles the writings of various authors on the topic of fascism and the far-right. It serves as an English-language source book to introduce readers to pre-fascist anti-liberalism, interwar fascism in Italy and Germany, as well as associated international variants of fascism from Argentina to Japan.

== Description ==
Griffin attempts a comprehensive survey of the illiberal right-wing throughout the 20th century, including topics as diverse as radical ecologism, neo-paganism, ultra-nationalism, and fanatical racism. Authors include an eclectic mix of philosophers, politicians, poets, agitators, and social critics, ranging from the fairly benign pessimistic poet-scholars of Weimar Germany (such as Stefan George, Ernst Jünger, and Martin Heidegger) to the rhetoric of those such as Heinrich Himmler and the American white supremacist, William Pierce. Griffin principally examines interwar Italian Fascism and German Nazism, with political and historiographical analysis by contemporary and post-war liberals, Marxists, and conservatives.

There are 214 selections in the book, most of them from pre-1945. About half of them are from Italy and Germany, plus a section on "abortive fascisms" with writings from Britain, Spain, France and numerous other countries in Europe, Africa and South America. A section is devoted to "theories of fascism," and the book concludes with a collation of post-war writings.
