= Roger Griffin =

British historian and professor (born 1948)

Roger David Griffin
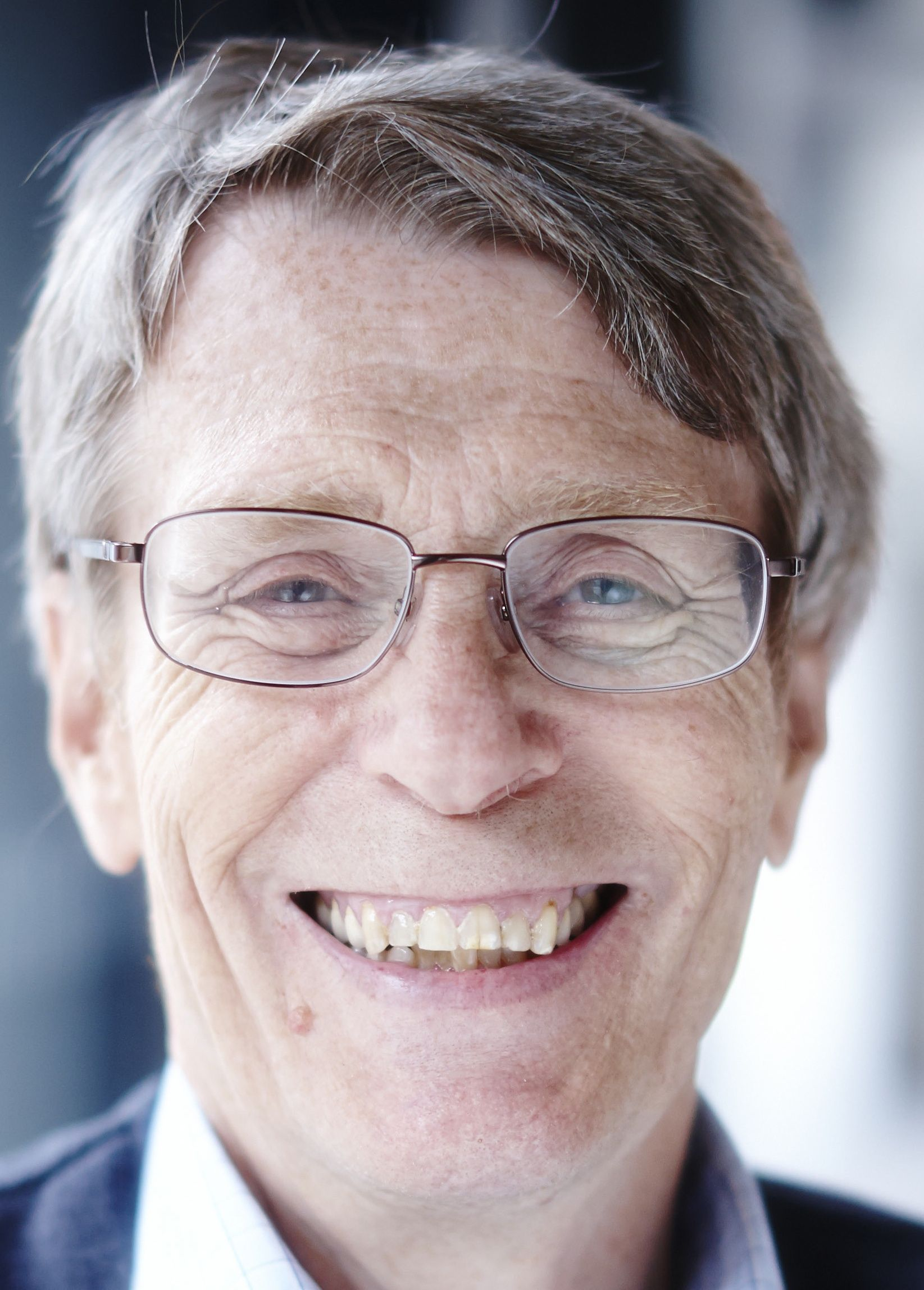
- Griffin in 2013
- Born: 31 January 1948 (age 78)
- Occupation: Professor

Roger David Griffin (born 31 January 1948) is a British professor of modern history and political theorist at Oxford Brookes University, England. His principal interest is the socio-historical and ideological dynamics of fascism.

== Education and career ==
Griffin obtained a First in French and German Literature from Oxford University, then began teaching History of ideas at Oxford Polytechnic (now Oxford Brookes). Becoming interested in the study of extremist right-wing movements and regimes which have shaped modern history, Griffin obtained a PhD from Oxford University in 1990. He first developed his palingenesis theory of fascism in his PhD thesis. His best known work is The Nature of Fascism (1991). In May 2011, he received an Honorary Doctorate from the University of Leuven in recognition of his services to the comparative study of fascism.

== Research and writing ==
Griffin's theory, set out first in The Nature of Fascism in 1991, and more recently in Fascism: An Introduction to Comparative Fascist Studies (2017), offers a heuristically useful ideal type of fascism as a form of revolutionary organic nationalist movement, or palingenetic ultranationalism. For Griffin, fascism directly mobilises popular energies or works through an elite to eventually achieve the cultural hegemony of new values and the total rebirth of the 'ultranation', whether conceived as a historic nation-state or as a race or ethnos, from what it defines as the present state of decadence. Fascism is an ideology that has assumed a large number of specific national permutations and several distinct organizational forms. Moreover, it is a political project that continues to evolve to this day throughout the Europeanized world, though it remains highly marginalised compared with the central place it occupied in inter-war Europe, and its central role in identity politics has been largely replaced by non-revolutionary forms of radical right-wing populism.

Griffin's approach, though still highly contested by some people, has nonetheless influenced the comparative literature on fascism of the last 25 years, drawing on the work of George Mosse, Stanley Payne, and Emilio Gentile to highlight the revolutionary and totalising politico-cultural nature of the fascist revolution in marked contrast to Marxist approaches. His book, Modernism and Fascism, locates the mainspring of the fascist drive for national rebirth in the modernist bid to achieve an alternative modernity, which is driven by a rejection of the decadence of 'actually existing modernity' under liberal democracy or tradition. The fascist attempt to institute a different civilisation and a new temporality in the West found its most comprehensive expression in the 'modernist states' of Benito Mussolini and Adolf Hitler. Since 1945 fascism has diversified and can no longer form a mass movement that is populist and charismatic, having been reduced instead to terroristic attacks on liberal democratic society and those it deems 'enemies' of the 'true' nation/race and its rebirth.

His most recent research has been on terrorism. In his Terrorist's Creed: Fanatical Violence and the Human Need for Meaning he studies the origins and motivations behind terrorism. He compares the origins of terrorism to the extremes of the National Socialists in the 1930s, noting that "fanatics" separate the world into good and evil, and then undergo "heroic doubling" where they see themselves as warriors in the battle between good and evil.

This theme will be pursued and deepened in his next monograph The Divisible Self: Heroic Doubling and the Origins of Modern Violence (Columbia: Agenda, Columbia University Press, September 2021).

Griffin was co-founder of the open access journal Fascism (Brill) and co-founder of COMFAS, International Association for the Comparative Study of Fascism, directed by Professor Constantin Iordachi (Central European University).

Griffin has translated works by Norberto Bobbio and Ferruccio Rossi-Landi.

Griffin used to count trance music and rave culture among his interests. He wrote the sleeve notes for the two CD volume Return To The Source: Deep Trance & Ritual Beats, explaining his liking of the genre and how it relates to society.

== Selected works ==
=== Monographs ===
- The Nature of Fascism (St. Martin's Press, 1991 ISBN 0-312-07132-9, Routledge, 1993, ISBN 0-415-09661-8)
- Fascism (Oxford Readers) (Oxford University Press, 1995, ISBN 0-19-289249-5)
- International Fascism: Theories, Causes and the New Consensus, Edward Arnold, 1998, ISBN 0-340-70614-7)
- Fascism: Critical Concepts in Political Science edited with Matthew Feldman (Routledge, 2004, ISBN 0-415-29015-5)
- Griffin, Roger, ed. (2005). Fascism, Totalitarianism and Political Religion. Routledge. ISBN 9781136871689.
- Modernism and Fascism: The Sense of a Beginning under Mussolini and Hitler (view Table of contents, Introduction, and Index, Palgrave, 2007, ISBN 1-4039-8783-1)
- A Fascist Century: Essays by Roger Griffin, ed. by Matthew Feldman (view Table of contents, Chapter 1, and Index, Palgrave, 2008, ISBN 0-230-22089-4)
- Terrorist's Creed: Fanatical Violence and the Human Need for Meaning, Palgrave, 2012, ISBN 0-230-24129-8
- Fascism. An Introduction to Comparative Fascist Studies (Polity, 2017) ISBN 9781509520688
- Fascism in the series Quick Immersions (Tibidado, 2020)
- The Divisible Self: Heroic Doubling and the Origins of Modern Violence (Columbia: Agenda, Columbia University Press, September 2021)

=== Articles ===
- 'Interregnum or endgame? Radical Right Thought in the 'Post-fascist' Era', in Michael Freeden (ed.), Reassessing Political Ideologies (Routledge, London, 2001), pp. 116–131.
- Griffin, Roger (2007). "The 'Holy Storm': 'Clerical fascism' through the Lens of Modernism". Totalitarian Movements and Political Religions. 8 (2): 213–227. doi:10.1080/14690760701321130. S2CID 143765495.
- Football in No-Man's-Land? The prospects for a fruitful "inter-camp" dialogue within fascist studies between Marxists and non-Marxists, for special issue of European Journal for Political Theory, vol. 9, no. 2 (2012)
- Fixing Solutions: Fascist Temporalities as Remedies for Liquid Modernity]. In: Journal of Modern European History 13 (2015), 1, 15–23. (Introduction to a forum on Fascist Temporalities)
- The role of heroic doubling in terrorist radicalisation: a non-psychiatric perspective', International review of psychiatry, vol. 29, no. 4 (2017), pp. 355–61.
- 'Building the visible immortality of the nation: The centrality of 'rooted modernism' to the Third Reich's Architectural New Order', Fascism, vol. 7, no. 1 (2018), pp. 9–44.
