= Gheorghe Cantacuzino-Grănicerul =

Romanian politician

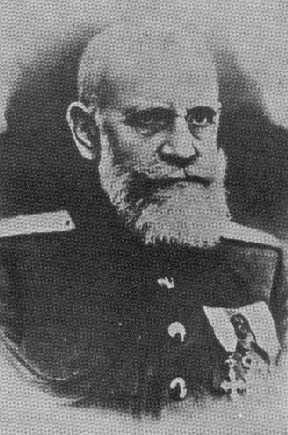
- Born: Gheorghe Cantacuzino; December 25, 1869; Paris, France
- Died: October 9, 1937 (aged 67); Bucharest, Romania
- Burial place: Bellu Cemetery, Bucharest
- Other name: Grănicerul
- Spouse: Elena Kalinderu
- Military career
- Allegiance: Romania; Spain
- Branch: Romanian Armed Forces
- Service years: 1883 — 1918
- Rank: General
- Nickname: Zizi
- Commands: 1st Border Guard Regiment; Border Guard Brigade
- Conflicts: Second Balkan War; World War I; Nagyszeben Offensive; Spanish Civil War
- Awards: Order of Michael the Brave, 3rd Class (October 16, 1916)

Gheorghe Cantacuzino-Grănicerul (December 25, 1869 – October 9, 1937) was a Romanian landowner, general, and far-right politician who was a member of the Iron Guard, and a member of the Legionary Senate.

== Biography ==
Gheorghe Cantacuzino was born in Paris into the noble Greek Cantacuzino family. He was the son of engineer I.G. Cantacuzino, a descendant of Prince Șerban Cantacuzino. He studied at the Romanian high school in Fontenay-aux-Roses until 1881 and at the "Saint George" High School in France. In 1883 he entered the Military School in Craiova, and starting with 1890 at the Infantry School in Bucharest.

== Military career ==
In 1892, Cantacuzino became a second lieutenant and was attached to a mountain troops unit. Later in 1910 he was promoted to the rank of major and appointed chief of staff of the Minister of War, Nicolae Filipescu. He participated in the Second Balkan War in 1913 and was promoted to the rank of lieutenant-colonel in 1914.

At the beginning of the First World War he was commander of the 1st Regiment of Border Guards from Predeal, with which he occupied the city of Brașov, one of the first victories since the beginning of the war. During the retreat of the Romanian troops in front of the offensive of the Central Powers soldiers, he participated in the battles on the Prahova Valley, from the Rucăr-Bran Pass and then on the front from the Argeș Mountains to the river Olt. Wounded by a shell, Cantacuzino returned to command the regiment after recovery. Cantacuzino was promoted to the rank of colonel and later to the rank of general. He was decorated with the Order of Michael the Brave, 3rd class, for the way he led the Border Guard Brigade in the 1916 campaign. "For the bravery and worth shown on the battlefield in the Carpathians." from the High Decree no. 2990 of October 1, 1916, page 55.

In 1917 he commanded the Border Guard Brigade from Târgu Ocna and participated, under the command of General Alexandru Averescu, in the battles on the Oituz Valley, ensuring the stabilization of the front in this region. After the armistice, the border guard brigade was moved to Iași. In December 1918, after the signing of the Treaty of Bucharest, he resigned from the army considering that the treaty was incompatible with the honor of soldier. He was transferred to the reserve with the rank of general. In 1915 he sold one of his estates in Vâlcea County to buy 15 modern machine guns with which he endowed the regiment.

French General Henri Berthelot, the head of the French Military Mission during the First World War, characterized Gheorghe Cantacuzino as follows: "He is a man whom you must imprison in time of peace and release in time of war."

Instead, the politician Constantin Argetoianu characterized him caustically: "Poor Zizi was a joke all his life and so he will die, but not on the front but in his bed."

== Civil career ==
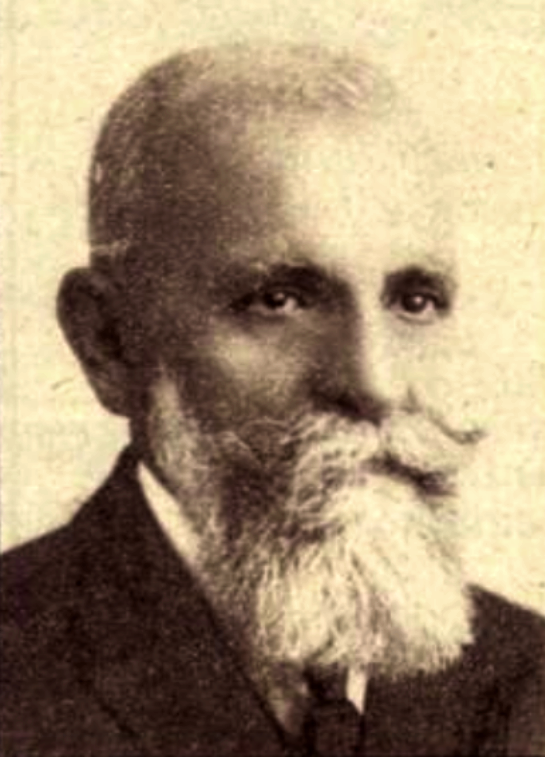
Cantacuzino in 1931

Gheorghe Cantacuzino was appointed administrator of civil hospitals and was elected deputy of Vâlcea County from the People's Party led by Alexandru Averescu in 1920 and, later, was deputy of Tulcea County for the Progressive Conservative Party for both 1922 and 1926.

On December 10, 1934, Corneliu Zelea Codreanu appointed him president of the nationalist party Totul pentru Țară, the successor of the Iron Guard, after the latter was outlawed, the de facto leader remaining Codreanu himself.

In 1936, Gheorghe Cantacuzino led a group of Legionnaires who went to fight in the Spanish Civil War on the side of the Nationalist faction. After a short stay in Spain, he returned to Romania the same year, leaving only the rest of the group on the front. He died in Bucharest in 1937 and was buried in the city's Bellu Cemetery.

== Personal life ==
Gheorghe Cantacuzino was married to Elena Kalinderu and was the owner of the building in Imprimeriei Street, no. 3 (later Gutenberg Street). From 1937 onwards, the property served as the Totul pentru Țară party headquarters, in addition to the general Iron Guard headquarters in Bucureștii Noi known as Casa Verde ("the Green House"). In 1940, a second building, built by Legionnaires through voluntary work, was opened on the property.

The original house, located in a protected area and despite a request to classify the building as a historical monument, was demolished in May 2010 due to dysfunctions between the Culture Department of Bucharest, the National Commission of Historical Monuments, and the Ministry of Culture and Prefecture. As of 2023, the second building on the property (built by Legionnaires) continues to exist.

Gheorghe Manu was Gheorghe Cantacuzino's uncle.
