= List of Romanian brands =

This is a list of Romanian brands:

== Active brands ==
- 5 to go (Coffee chain)
- Aerostar (Military aircraft maintenance company)
- Allview (Smartphones)
- Alro (Aluminium products)
- Altex (electronics store)
- Animawings (Low-cost airline)
- Antena 1 (TV network)
- Antena 3 CNN (TV network)
- Antibiotice Iași (Medicine)
- Apulum (Porcelain producer)
- Arabesque (Building materials)
- Arctic (Household appliances)
- Astra Bus (Bus manufacturer)
- Autonet Group (Auto parts)
- Avioane Craiova (Military aircraft)
- Azomureș (Fertilizers)
- B1 TV (TV network)
- Banca Comercială Română (Financial services company and investment bank)
- Banca Transilvania (Financial services company and investment bank)
- Bitdefender (Cybersecurity)
- Blue Air (Low-cost airline)
- BRD – Groupe Société Générale (Financial services company and investment bank)
- C&I Eurotrans (Coachbuilder)
- Carpatair (Low-cost airline)
- Catena (pharmacy)
- Căile Ferate Române (National railway system)
- CEC Bank (Financial services company and investment bank)
- Ciuc (Beer brand based in Miercurea Ciuc)
- Conpet (Crude oil transport company)
- Continental Hotels (Hotel chain)
- DAC (Trucks and buses)
- DACO (Stationery)
- Dacia (Cars)
- Dan Air (Low-cost airline)
- Digi Communications (Telecommunications, cable TV and internet)
- Digi24 (TV network)
- Dedeman (Chain of home improvement stores)
- El Car (Bus manufacturer)
- Electrica (Electricity distribution)
- eMAG (e-commerce platform)
- Exim Banca Românească (Financial services company and investment bank)
- Faringosept (Pills for throat pains)
- Farmacia Tei (Pharmacy)
- Farmec (Cosmetics company founded in 1889)
- FAUR (Locomotives, Diesel engines)
- Flanco (Electronics stores)
- Fly Lili (Airline]]
- Focus Sat (Satellite TV, streaming, OTT media services)
- Ford Romania (Cars)
- GETT'S (Beauty products)
- Grivco (Holding company)
- Grivița (Bus manufacturer)
- Heinner (Household appliances)
- HelloJets (Low-cost airline)
- Hidroelectrica (Hydroelectricity)
- Hora (Musical instruments)
- Horizon (TV manufacturer)
- ICE Felix (Computer manufacturer)
- Industria Aeronautică Română (Military aircraft)
- Jolidon (Lingerie and swimsuits)
- Lamit Co. (Telecommunications)
- Libra Internet Bank (Financial services company and investment bank)
- Luca (bakery)
- Marelbo (Shoes and clothing)
- Meze Audio (Headphone and earphone company)
- Mobexpert (Chain of furniture stores)
- Myria (Household appliances)
- Napolact (Dairy products)
- Național 24 Plus (TV network)
- Nuclearelectrica (Nuclear energy company)
- Oltchim (Chemical products)
- Oradea Transport Local (Public transport operator in Oradea)
- Orange Romania (Telecommunications)
- OTV (TV network)
- Pegas (bicycle company)
- Petrom (Gas station chain owned by OMV)
- Poiana (chocolate)
- Polidin (An immunomodulator vaccine)
- RATBV (Public transport operator in Brașov)
- Regio Călători (Rail transport company)
- Rom (chocolate)
- Roman (Trucks)
- România TV (TV network)
- Romgaz (Natural gas producer)
- Rompetrol (Gas station)
- Romstal (Installation equipment)
- Salt Bank (Financial services company and investment bank)
- Sam Mills (Food company)
- Societatea de Transport Public Timișoara (Public transport operator in Timișoara)
- TAROM (Airline)
- Telekom Romania (Telecommunications)
- Timișoreana (Beer brand founded in 1718 and based in Timișoara)
- Transelectrica (Electricity)
- Transgaz (Natural gas transmission operator)
- TVR (TV network)
- UniCredit Bank (Financial services company and investment bank)
- UNIO (Machine building)
- Ursus (Beer)
- UTV (TV network)

== Former brands ==
- ARO (Offroad vehicles, 1957-2006)
- Astra Vagoane Arad (Trams, trains, rail cars and tram cars, 1891-1998)
- AZO (Photosensitive materials, 1981-2003)
- Banca Românească (Financial services company and investment bank, 1991-2023)
- Bancorex (Financial services company and investment bank, 1968-1999)
- Bancpost (Financial services company and investment bank, 1991-2019)
- Carpați (cigarette) (1931-2010)
- Domo (electronics store) (1994-2015)
- Electrometal Timișoara (Trams and machine building, 1959-1990)
- Întreprinderea de Construcții Aeronautice Românești (Aircraft, 1932-1951)
- Mobra (Mopeds and motorcycles, 1971-1994)
- Pic (hypermarket) (1990-2009)
- Rocar (Buses, trolleybuses and vans, 1951-2004)
- Societatea Pentru Exploatări Tehnice (Aircraft, 1932-1946)
- Uzina Tractorul Brașov (Tractors, 1952-2007)
