= Lists of brands =

This is an index of brand-related list articles on Wikipedia.

== General ==
- List of anamorphic format trade names
- List of automotive fuel brands
- List of bottle types, brands and companies
- British Rail brand names
- List of car audio manufacturers and brands
- List of celebrity-branded perfumes
- List of cigar brands
- List of cigarette brands
- List of defunct consumer brands
- List of digital camera brands
- Dunlop (brands)
- List of electronics brands
- List of firearm brands
- List of perfumes
- List of chained-brand hotels
- List of ibuprofen brand names
- List of Icelandic brands
- List of company and product names derived from indigenous peoples
- List of Italian brands
- List of La Marzocco products
- List of laptop brands and manufacturers
- List of lingerie brands
- List of rolling papers
- List of toys
- List of Marks & Spencer brands
- List of Mexican brands
- List of microbreweries
- List of common microcontrollers
- List of paracetamol brand names
- List of pen types, brands and companies
- List of piano brand names
- List of Procter & Gamble brands
- List of renamed products
- List of Romanian brands
- List of Royal Enfield motorcycles
- List of sewing machine brands
- List of Slovenian brands
- List of smart cards
- List of toy soldiers brands
- List of convertible tablet computer brands
- List of toothpaste brands
- List of Unilever brands
- List of video telecommunication services and product brands
- List of Walmart brands
- List of most valuable brands

== Beverage brands ==
- List of cider brands
- List of Coca-Cola brands
- List of Dr Pepper Snapple brands
- List of Jones Soda flavors
- List of microbreweries
- List of Molson Coors brands
- List of Pepsi variations
- List of piscos
- List of rum producers
- List of brand name soft drinks products
- List of soft drinks by country
- List of tequilas
- List of vodkas
- List of whisky brands
- List of bottled water brands

== Food brands ==
- List of brand name breads
- List of breakfast cereals
- List of breath mints
- List of top-selling candy brands
- List of chewing gum brands
- List of chocolate bar brands
- List of ConAgra brands
- List of confectionery brands
- List of brand name food products
- List of frozen dessert brands
- List of frozen food brands
- List of ice cream brands
- List of instant noodle brands
- List of Japanese snacks
- List of Kraft brands
- List of mustard brands
- List of Nestlé brands
- List of popcorn brands
- List of potato chip brands
- List of brand name snack foods

== Sports brands ==
- List of bicycle brands and manufacturing companies
  - List of Australian bicycle brands and manufacturers
  - List of Japanese bicycle brands and manufacturers
- List of bicycle part manufacturing companies
- List of climbing and mountaineering equipment brands
- List of disc golf brands and manufacturers
- List of fitness wear brands
- List of golf equipment manufacturers
- List of skateboarding brands
- List of ski brands
- List of swimwear brands

== See also ==
- List of lists of lists
- Lists of companies
