= List of companies based in Satu Mare =

This is a list of companies based in Satu Mare, Romania.

- Autonet Group
- Sam Mills
- UNIO
- Coinvertit (Contessa Ltd)
