= Pegas =

Pegas may refer to:

- Meletius I Pegas (1549–1601), Greek Patriarch of Alexandria
- Pegas (bicycle company), a Romanian bicycle manufacturer
- Pegas 2000, a Czech manufacturer of paragliders and other aircraft
- Tomashevich Pegas, a WWII Soviet prototype aircraft
- Kia Pegas, a Chinese car model
- Pegas Fly, a Russian airline
- Pegas Touristik, a Russian tour operator

== See also ==
- Pegasus (disambiguation)
