= One Shot Left =

- Origin: Medicine Hat, Alberta, Canada
- Genres: Punk rock Skate punk Alternative rock
- Years active: 1997–present
- Label: Meter Records
- Members: Jeff Barrett; Blair Cooney; Dean Rud; Chad Schiebelbein
- Past members: Corey Tapp; Justin Brown; Dan Heaton; Rob Speers; Matt Whitson

One Shot Left is a Canadian punk rock band formed in 1997 from Medicine Hat, Alberta.

== History ==
=== Formation ===
Jeff Barrett (vocals/guitar) and Chad Schiebelbein (drums) formed what would become One Shot Left in 1995, while they were still in high school. Rob Speers (guitar/vocals) and Matt Whitson (bass) later joined the group, and early in 1998 the quartet was signed by the independent record label Meter Records from Calgary, Alberta.

=== Studio recordings and performances ===
After their first Western Canada tour in 1998, One Shot Left released six new songs on a split CD entitled Wet Feet. The two other bands featured on the CD, Guilt Trip and Darryl's Grocery Bag, were also signed to Meter Records. Dan Heaton replaced Matt Whitson on Something To Be Reckoned With, the band's debut album, released in 2000. Following its release, the group embarked on another western Canadian tour, this time with Guilt Trip. When Rob Speers moved to Vancouver, he was replaced by Weyburn resident Blair Cooney. Their first national Canadian tour began in April 2001, when the band toured from Victoria, British Columbia, to Montreal, Quebec.

One Shot Left's second full-length album, Restitution, was released in 2005, again by Meter Records. Bassist Justin Brown replaced Corey Tapp for the recording of this album, but left the band at the end of 2006 when he moved to China. Restitution was described as a, "Beautiful beacon in the future of rock," by Beatroute Magazine. The opening track on Restitution, "The Night Falls (On Wicked Little Ninjas)", reached No. 2 on Punk Radio Cast's Top 40.

The band most recently celebrated their 20-year anniversary in October 2018 with a retrospective show and release of their own beer, a New England IPA brewed in collaboration with Hell's Basement Brewery.

== Musical message ==
Lead vocalist and guitarist Jeff Barrett is primarily responsible for the band's lyrics. He stated in an interview with Punk Radio Cast that the bands see their music as a platform to provide their listeners with views and ideas that they may not otherwise be exposed to. The band is in favor of accepting people as they are and encourage their listeners to think for themselves rather than relying on stereotypes. Barrett said, "Our message is about standing up and stepping forward rather than passing off the bigoted comments around you."

== Discography ==
=== Studio albums ===
- In Defense Of Liberty (1998 - Cassette - Green Pea Records)
- Something To Be Reckoned With (2000 - CD - Meter Records)
- Restitution (2005 - CD - Meter Records)

=== Split albums ===
- Wet Feet (1998 - CD - Meter Records) with Guilt Trip and Darryl's Grocery Bag.

=== Compilations ===
- The Two Minute Wonder (1998 - CD - Hourglass Records)
- Flaming Cow Disease (1998 - CD - Spawner Records)
- Give Us A Break (2000 - CD - Spawner Records)
- For You From The Underground (2002 - CD - Meter Records)
- The Invasion (2005 - CD - Meter Records)
