= Nordwind Airlines =

Russian airline

Nordwind Airlines Северный ветер

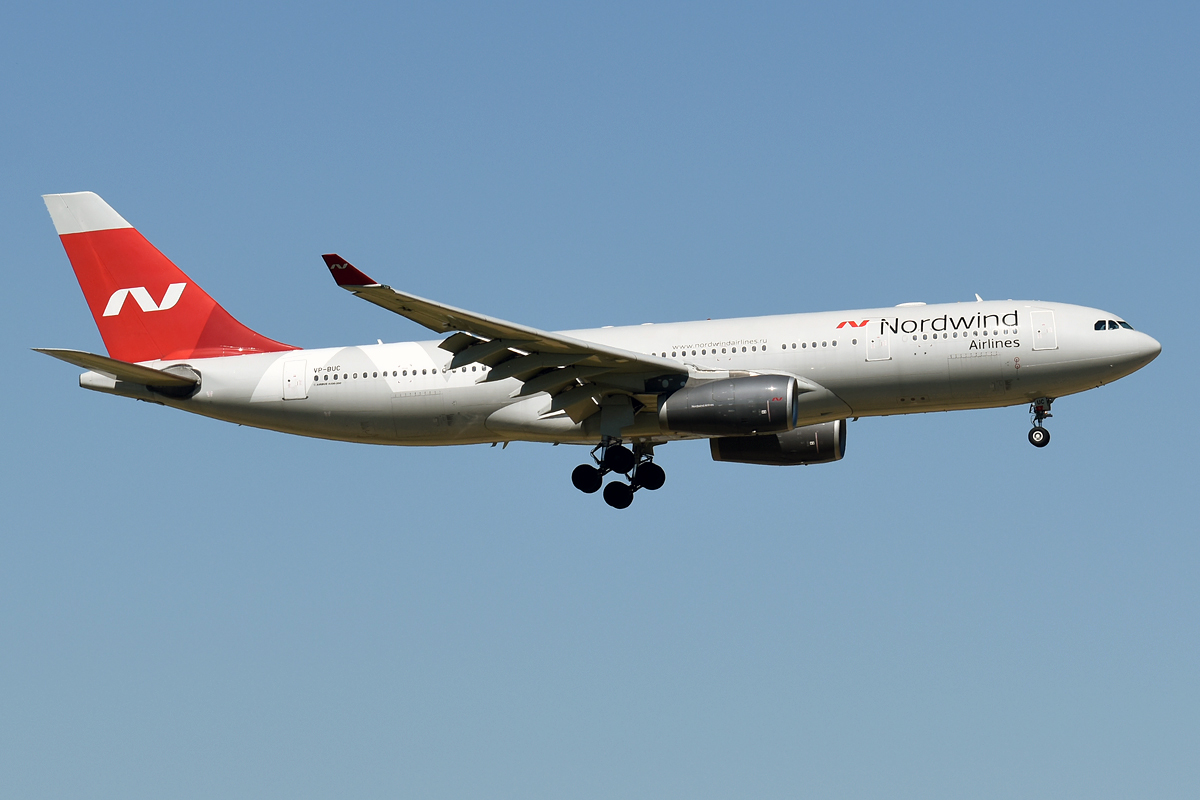
- Nordwind Airlines Airbus A330-200 in standard livery
IATA	ICAO	Call sign
N4	NWS	NORDLAND
- Founded: 2008; 18 years ago
- Operating bases: Sheremetyevo International Airport
- Subsidiaries: Pegas Fly
- Fleet size: 27
- Destinations: 74
- Parent company: Pegas Touristik
- Headquarters: Moscow, Russia
- Key people: Shvetsov Igor (general director)
- Website: nordwindairlines.ru

Nordwind Airlines, LLC (Russian: ООО Северный ветер, romanized: Severný veter) is a Russian leisure airline. The company is headquartered in Moscow, and its hub is at Sheremetyevo International Airport. Nordwind Airlines primarily operates service between airports in Russia and holiday destinations around Europe and Asia. It is banned from flying in the European Union.

== History ==
Nordwind Airlines was founded in August 2008 by the Russian and Turkish branches of tour operator Pegas Touristik and initially operated three Boeing 757-200s.

The number of passengers transported was as follows:

Year	Passengers
2008	20,000
2009	555,000
2010	1.2 million
2011	1.7 million
2012	2.2 million
2013	3.4 million
2014	4.4 million
2015	2.6 million
2016	1.7 million
2017	3.5 million
2018	4.9 million
2019	5.5 million
2020	2.9 million
2021	5.9 million

On 29 April 2013, two surface-to-air missiles were fired by unknown forces in Syria at a Nordwind Airlines jet flying from Sharm El Sheikh to Kazan. The pilots took evasive action and the plane continued onto Kazan undamaged.

In 2017, the airline acquired two used Airbus A330s.

The Wall Street Journal reported that Nordwind transported approximately 7.4 tons of gold with a market value over $300 million from Venezuela to a refinery near the airport in Entebbe, Uganda. These March 2019 shipments allegedly expose a global underground economy the United States government suspects helped President Nicolás Maduro stay in power in Venezuela, Before his ousting in early 2026.

Following the Russian invasion of Ukraine, Nordwind suspended all international flights. A number of leased aircraft, located abroad when the invasion took place have been returned to the lessors. The US Commerce Department, who had previously sanctioned US manufactured aircraft, extended sanctions to the European manufactured Airbus aircraft in Nordwind's fleet in August 2022. Sanctions have also banned Nordwind receiving spare parts for their planes.

== Destinations ==
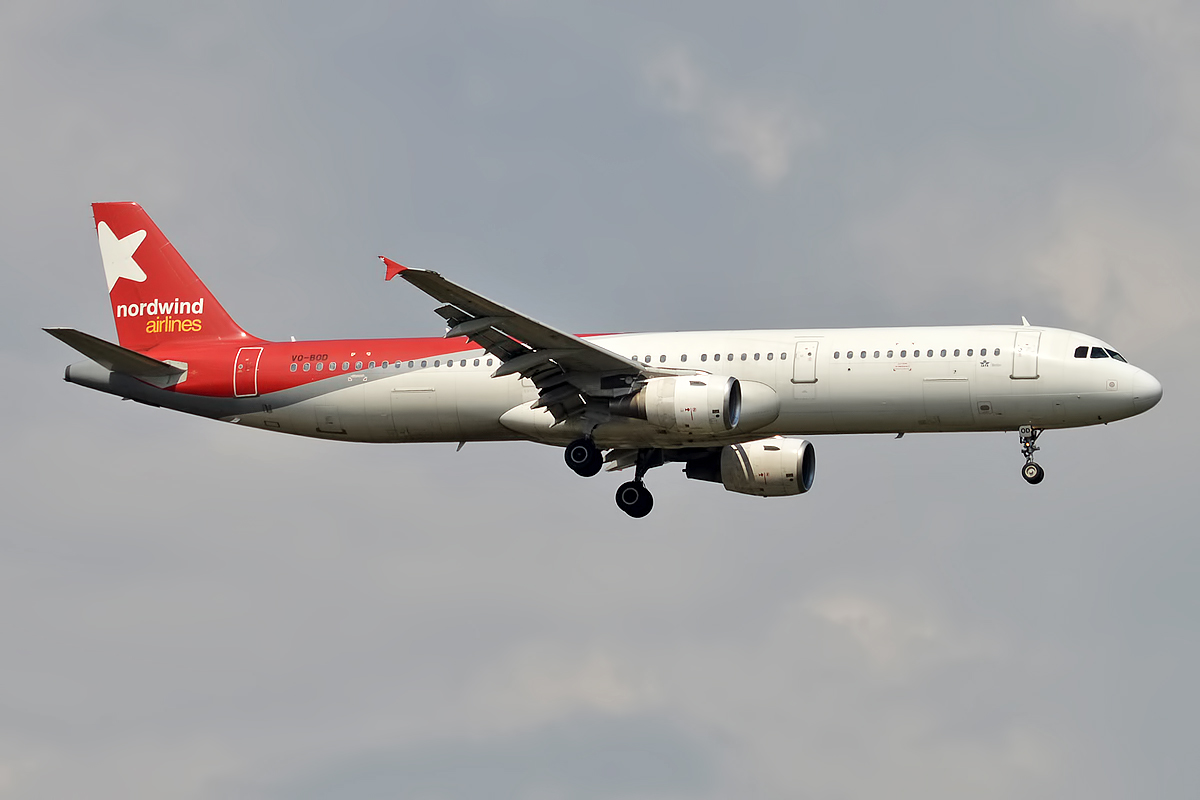
Nordwind Airlines Airbus A321-200

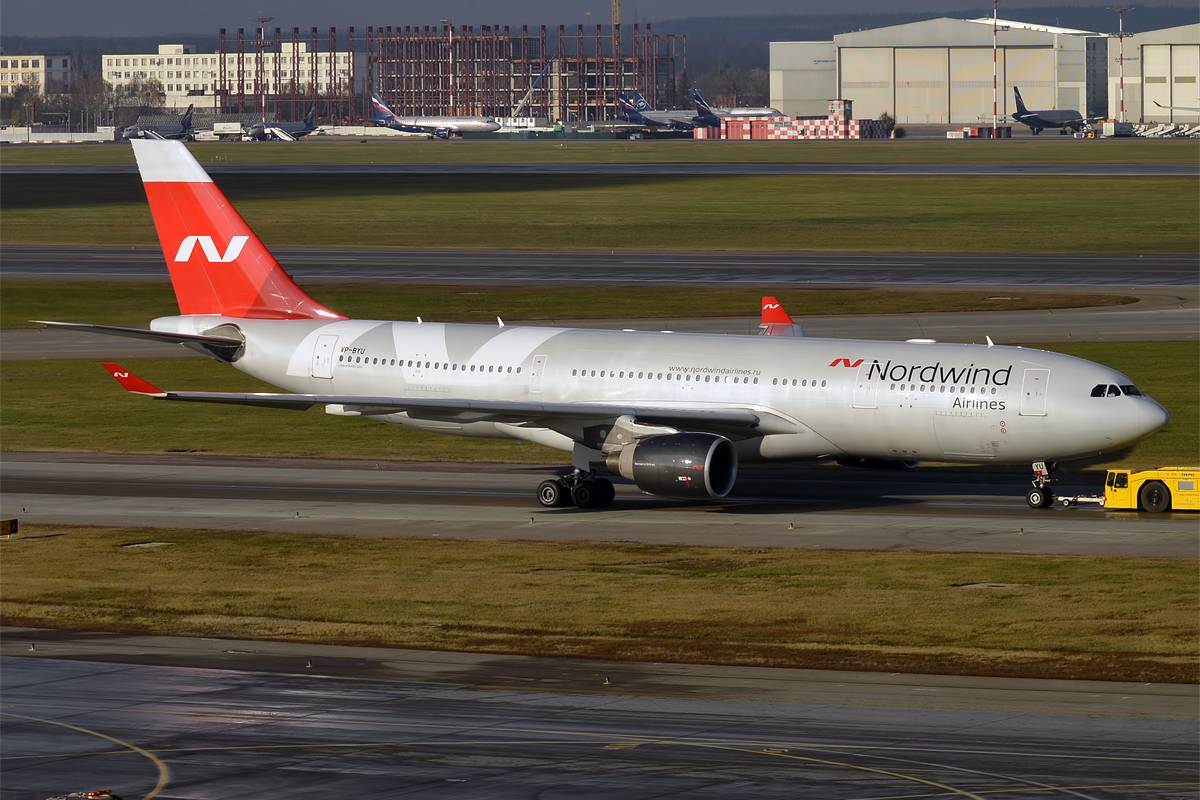
Nordwind Airlines Airbus A330-200

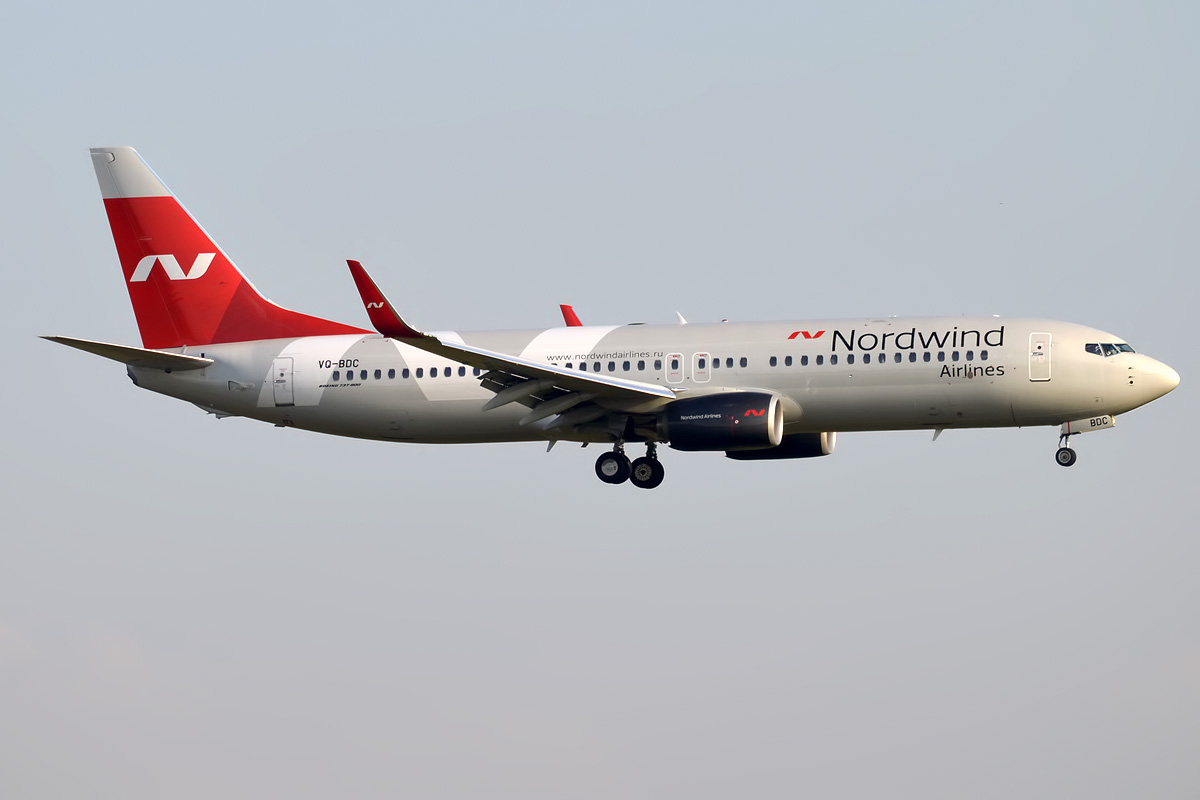
Nordwind Airlines Boeing 737-800

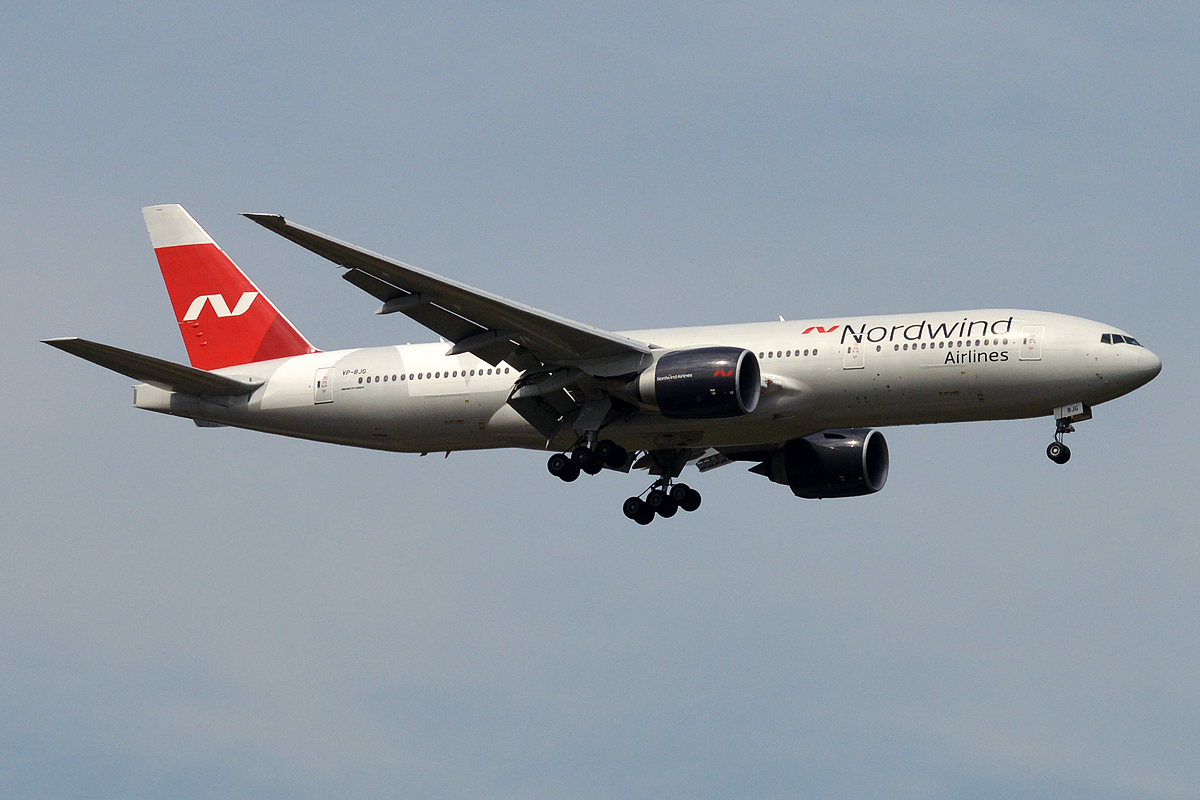
Nordwind Airlines Boeing 777-200ER

In 2021, Nordwind serves 98 destinations in 28 countries including nine countries and 23 cities in Europe, eight countries and 12 cities in the Middle East and Africa, four countries and four cities in South America, and six countries and 14 cities in Asia.

Country	City	Airport	Notes	Refs
Albania	Tirana	Tirana International Airport Nënë Tereza	Terminated	
Armenia	Yerevan	Zvartnots International Airport	Terminated	
Azerbaijan	Baku	Heydar Aliyev International Airport	Terminated	
Azerbaijan	Lankaran	Lankaran Airport	Terminated	
Belarus	Minsk	Minsk National Airport	Terminated	
Cuba	Cayo Coco	Cayo Coco Airport	Terminated	
Cuba	Holguín	Frank País Airport	Terminated	
Cyprus	Larnaca	Larnaca International Airport	Terminated	
Dominican Republic	Puerto Plata	Gregorio Luperón International Airport	Terminated	
Dominican Republic	Punta Cana	Punta Cana International Airport	Terminated	
Dominican Republic	Samaná	Samaná El Catey International Airport	Terminated	
Dominican Republic	Santo Domingo	Las Américas International Airport	Terminated	
Egypt	Hurghada	Hurghada International Airport	Terminated	
Egypt	Sharm El Sheikh	Sharm El Sheikh International Airport	Terminated	
Germany	Berlin	Berlin Brandenburg Airport	Terminated	
Germany	Düsseldorf	Düsseldorf Airport	Terminated	
Germany	Hanover	Hannover Airport	Terminated	
Greece	Athens	Athens International Airport	Terminated	
Greece	Heraklion	Heraklion International Airport	Terminated	
Greece	Thessaloniki	Thessaloniki Airport	Terminated	
India	Goa	Dabolim Airport	Terminated	
Iran	Tehran	Tehran Imam Khomeini International Airport	Terminated	
Jamaica	Montego Bay	Sangster International Airport	Terminated	
Jordan	Aqaba	King Hussein International Airport	Terminated	
Kazakhstan	Almaty	Almaty International Airport	Terminated	
Kyrgyzstan	Bishkek	Manas International Airport		
Maldives	Male	Velana International Airport	Terminated	
Mexico	Cancún	Cancún International Airport	Terminated	
North Korea	Pyongyang	Pyongyang International Airport		
North Macedonia	Skopje	Skopje International Airport	Terminated	
Russia	Blagoveshchensk	Ignatyevo Airport		
Russia	Cheboksary	Cheboksary International Airport		
Russia	Chelyabinsk	Chelyabinsk Airport		
Russia	Irkutsk	International Airport Irkutsk		
Russia	Ivanovo	Ivanovo Airport	Seasonal	
Russia	Kaliningrad	Khrabrovo Airport	Focus city	
Russia	Kazan	Ğabdulla Tuqay Kazan International Airport	Hub	
Russia	Khabarovsk	Khabarovsk Novy Airport		
Russia	Kirov	Pobedilovo Airport	Seasonal	
Russia	Krasnodar	Krasnodar International Airport		
Russia	Krasnoyarsk	Krasnoyarsk International Airport		
Russia	Magnitogorsk	Magnitogorsk International Airport		
Russia	Makhachkala	Uytash Airport	Focus city	
Russia	Mineralnye Vody	Mineralnye Vody Airport		
Russia	Moscow	Sheremetyevo International Airport	Hub	
Russia	Nizhnekamsk	Begishevo Airport		
Russia	Nizhnevartovsk	Nizhnevartovsk Airport	Terminated	
Russia	Novosibirsk	Tolmachevo Airport		
Russia	Omsk	Omsk Tsentralny Airport		
Russia	Orenburg	Orenburg Tsentralny Airport		
Russia	Perm	Perm International Airport		
Russia	Rostov-on-Don	Platov International Airport	Terminated	
Russia	Saint Petersburg	Pulkovo Airport	Focus city	
Russia	Samara	Kurumoch International Airport		
Russia	Saransk	Saransk Airport	Terminated	
Russia	Saratov	Saratov Gagarin Airport		
Russia	Sochi	Adler-Sochi International Airport	Focus city	
Russia	Surgut	Farman Salmanov Surgut Airport		
Russia	Syktyvkar	Syktyvkar Airport	Terminated	
Russia	Tyumen	Roshchino International Airport		
Russia	Ufa	Mostay Kərim Ufa International Airport	Focus city	
Russia	Ulyanovsk	Ulyanovsk Baratayevka Airport		
Russia	Volgograd	Volgograd International Airport		
Russia	Yakutsk	Yakutsk Airport		
Russia	Yekaterinburg	Koltsovo International Airport		
Ukraine (Note: Disputed. See Annexation of Crimea by the Russian Federation.)	Simferopol	Simferopol International Airport	Terminated	
Saudi Arabia	Jeddah	King Abdulaziz International Airport	Terminated	
Serbia	Belgrade	Belgrade Nikola Tesla Airport	Terminated	
Spain	Barcelona	Barcelona–El Prat Airport	Terminated	
Spain	Girona	Girona Airport	Terminated	
Spain	Palma de Mallorca	Palma de Mallorca Airport	Terminated	
Spain	Reus	Reus Airport	Terminated	
Tanzania	Zanzibar	Abeid Amani Karume International Airport	Terminated	
Tajikistan	Bokhtar	Bokhtar International Airport		
Tajikistan	Dushanbe	Dushanbe International Airport		
Tajikistan	Khujand	Khujand Airport		
Tajikistan	Kulob	Kulob Airport	Begins 27 September 2026	
Thailand	Bangkok	Suvarnabhumi Airport	Terminated	
Thailand	Krabi	Krabi International Airport	Terminated	
Thailand	Pattaya	U-Tapao International Airport	Terminated	
Thailand	Phuket	Phuket International Airport	Seasonal charter	
Thailand	Surat Thani	Surat Thani International Airport	Terminated	
Tunisia	Djerba	Djerba–Zarzis International Airport	Terminated	
Tunisia	Monastir	Monastir Habib Bourguiba International Airport	Terminated	
Turkey	Antalya	Antalya Airport	Terminated	
Turkey	Dalaman	Dalaman Airport	Terminated	
Turkey	İzmir	İzmir Adnan Menderes Airport	Terminated	
Turkey	Istanbul	Istanbul Airport		
United Arab Emirates	Dubai	Al Maktoum International Airport	Terminated	
United Arab Emirates	Sharjah	Sharjah International Airport	Terminated	
Uzbekistan	Fergana	Fergana International Airport	Terminated	
Uzbekistan	Namangan	Namangan Airport		
Uzbekistan	Qarshi	Qarshi Airport	Terminated	
Uzbekistan	Samarqand	Samarqand International Airport		
Uzbekistan	Tashkent	Islam Karimov Tashkent International Airport		
Uzbekistan	Urgench	Urgench International Airport	Terminated	
Venezuela	Porlamar	Santiago Mariño Caribbean International Airport	Seasonal	
Vietnam	Nha Trang	Cam Ranh International Airport	Seasonal charter	

=== Codeshare agreements ===
In March 2025, Belavia and Nordwind Airlines signed a codeshare agreement to operate connection flights through Kazan Airport and Pulkovo Airport.

== Fleet ==
As of August 2025, Nordwind Airlines operates the following aircraft:

Nordwind Airlines fleet
Aircraft	In service	Orders	Passengers			Notes
Aircraft	In service	Orders	J	Y	Total	Notes
Airbus A321-200	5	—	—	220	220	
Airbus A321neo	2	—	—	218	218	
Airbus A330-200	2	—	—	361	361	
Airbus A330-300	3	—	34	259	293	
Boeing 737-800	11	—	12	156	168	VP-BSA returned to Ireland. VP-BDU returned to lessor.
Boeing 737-800	11	—	—	189	189	VP-BSA returned to Ireland. VP-BDU returned to lessor.
Boeing 777-200ER	2	—	—	440	440	
Boeing 777-300ER	2	—	6	480	486	VP-BJP returned to the USA and was converted into a freighter.
Boeing 777-300ER	2	—	—	486	486	VP-BJP returned to the USA and was converted into a freighter.
Irkut MC-21-300	—	5	TBA			
Total	27	5				

In 2022, Air Lease Corporation were seeking to recover two A321neo and four Boeing 737-800s, as the lease payments were not being made.

The fleet previously included the following aircraft:

- Airbus A320-200
- Boeing 757-200
- Boeing 767-300ER
