= Florin Andronescu =

Romanian businessman

- Born: 26 April 1957 (age 68)
- Occupation: Businessperson

Florin Andronescu (born 26 April 1957, Bucharest) is a businessperson from Romania, who has been involved with the companies Flanco and Credisson from the sale of which he obtained around 20 million euros. He also developed the network of Sanador clinics.
