= Jones Soda =

Beverage company based in Seattle, WA

Jones Soda Co.
- Type: Public
- Industry: OTCQB: JSDA; Nasdaq: JSDA
- Founded: 1995; 31 years ago in Vancouver, British Columbia, Canada
- Founder: Peter Van Stolk
- Headquarters: SODO area of Seattle, Seattle, United States
- Area served: United States and Canada
- Key people: CEO Scott Harvey, CFO Brian Meadows, CCO Darcey Macken, CMO Eric Schnabel
- Products: Craft Soda, Modern Soda and Adult Beverages - Spiked Jones and Mary Jones
- Revenue: ▲ Jones reported revenue of $24 million in 2025, up from $17.8 million from beverages in 2024. US$6.02 million (2022)
- Net income: ▼US$1.44 million (2022)
- Subsidiaries: Lemoncocco
- Website: www.jonessoda.com

Jones Soda Co. is a craft soda manufacturer based in Seattle, Washington. The company distributes craft sodas under the Jones Soda brand. Its mainstream soda line is sold across North America in bottles, cans, and on fountain through traditional beverage outlets, restaurants, and alternative accounts.

== History ==
=== 1990s ===
In 1987 Peter van Stolk founded Urban Hand Limited, Edmonton, Western Canada. This company specialized in beverage distribution. It introduced the Jones Soda brand in 1997.

=== 2000s ===
By 2000, over 85% of the company's revenue came from the Jones Soda brand. The company officially changed its name to Jones Soda and moved its headquarters from Vancouver to Seattle. In November 2006, Jones Soda announced it would replace high fructose corn syrup (HFCS) in its products with cane sugar (specifically inverted sugar syrup).

On January 22, 2007, Jones Pure Cane Soda launched in 12-ounce cans. By April 2007, all products had switched to cane sugar, with the exception of the energy drink line, which transitioned that fall. Later that year, the company announced an $11.6 million loss due to the attempted expansion into the canned-soda market, where high barriers to entry made it difficult to compete with large companies like Coca-Cola and Pepsi.

In 2008, after reporting a second-quarter loss, Jones Soda downsized its workforce by 42 employees (40% of its staff), to cut annual costs by over $2.6 million annually.

=== 2010s ===
In March 2010, Jones Soda agreed to allow rival, Reed's, Inc., to purchase the company at a steep discount. Later in the month, Jones backed out of the purchase. The company then named former Talking Rain president William Meissner as President and CEO.

In June 2010, the company announced a distribution deal with Walmart and $10 million in financing from Glengrove Small Cap Value Ltd.

In June 2011, Jones moved out of its South Lake Union headquarters to a building in Pioneer Square opposite CenturyLink Field.

In 2012, Jennifer Cue was hired as CEO.

In Spring 2015, Jones moved out of its Pioneer Square building to a larger space in Seattle.

=== 2020s ===
In December 2020, Mark Murray was promoted to CEO.

== Beverage line ==
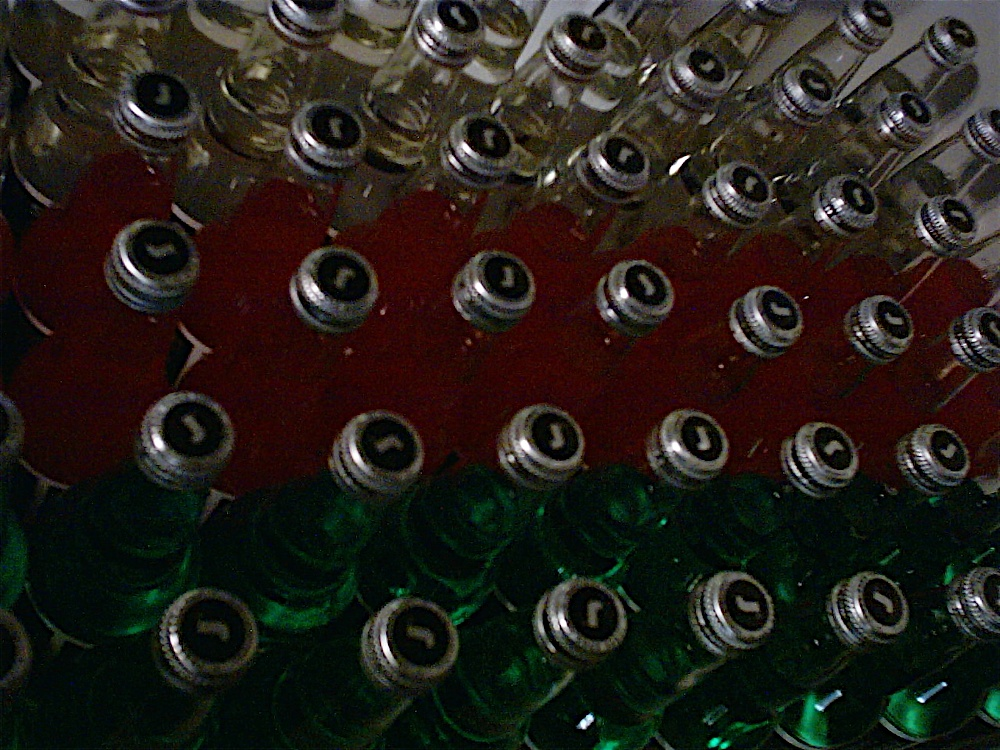
Bottles of Jones Soda

Jones Soda was developed in 1995 and introduced in 1996 with six flavors: Orange, Cherry, Lemon-Lime, Strawberry-Lime, Raspberry, and Grape in 12 oz. glass bottles.

On March 17, 2004, a deal was announced to distribute Jones Soda in over 3900 Starbucks locations in the United States, though Starbucks stopped distributing Jones Soda in the United States as of 2007. On October 12, 2004, Jones Soda introduced 12oz cans for the first time with an exclusive distribution deal with Target, though other stores (including some Kmart, Food Pyramid, and Albertsons locations) now also sell the cans. Jones Soda was also sold at Ruby Tuesday restaurant.

Since the introduction of the original flavors, Jones has created many additional flavors.

=== Slim and Sugar-Free ===
In January 1999, Jones introduced the "slim" line of diet sodas but discontinued it in 2003 in favor of a sugar-free line. Its sugar-free formulas contain sucralose of the Splenda brand and acesulfame potassium, but no aspartame.

Four flavors were considered "Mid-Calorie", including Twisted Lime, Watermelon, Tangerine, and Blueberry. These flavors were sweetened with Splenda, but still included 21 grams of sugar (compared to approximately 45–50 grams in the regular sodas).

In 2019, Jones introduced two new sugar-free flavors: SF Strawberry Lime, and SF Cream Soda. These flavors join sugar-free Cola on the current zero-sugar menu.

=== Jones Organics ===
In 2005, Jones announced a new line in its series: Jones Organics. The blends consist of six different tea-based flavors—two each of white tea, green tea, and red tea.

=== Nuka Cola ===
In collaboration with Target stores and Fallout series developer Bethesda Softworks, Jones Soda released a soda called Nuka-Cola quantum which was introduced in 2015 to promote the release of Fallout 4. A different flavor, Nuka Cola Victory, was released in 2024 during the launch of the Fallout TV series.

=== 7-Select ===
In 2016, Jones Soda partnered with 7-Eleven to produce a line of five flavors available exclusively at the convenience store chain.

=== Mary Jones ===
In 2022, Jones announced a cannabis-infused soda and candy brand, Mary Jones. The brand was to be rolled out in California as a test market starting April 1, and in other legalized states later.

== Non-beverage products ==
=== Frozen soda pops ===
In early 2005, Jones Soda entered the "frozen novelty" market with their Jones Frozen Soda Pops. They were available in Green Apple, Berry Lemonade, and Cherry soda flavors. The Jones Frozen Soda Pops were part of a three-year licensing agreement with Kroger, and are not currently available.

=== Carbonated candy ===
On October 19, 2005, a press statement was released in regards to Jones Soda's licensing agreement with Big Sky Brands to produce a soda "flavor booster" candy. At the time, they announced that the candy's three different flavors of "Jones Soda Carbonated Candy" would be Berry Lemonade, Fufu Berry, and Green Apple. The product was released in the United States in 2006. In 2007, the lineup was increased to six flavors, the three new flavors being Orange & Cream, Cream Soda, and M.F. Grape.

Jones expanded its carbonated candy line further in 2006 to include "Jones Soda Energy Boosters", which contain Niacin, Vitamin B12, Taurine, and Vitamin B6. Marketing literature says, "1 tin of Jones Boosters = 3 Jones Energy Drinks".

In 2007, Big Sky Brands announced a contest to incorporate 24 user-submitted photos of crazy, distorted sour face "cringes" onto a new labeling of "Jones Soda Carbonated Sours". They entered the market in 2008, initially in three flavors: Electric Lemonade, Limes with Orange, and Spiked Punch.

== Limited editions ==
=== 2003 ===
The first special edition of Jones was the Jones Hot Wheels Pack, created in July 2003 to honor the 35th anniversary of Hot Wheels. The pack included a Hot Wheels Jones Soda Orange RV along with four themed bottles and was only available through the Jones Soda website.

In November 2003, Jones introduced a "Turkey & Gravy" seasonal flavor in honor of Thanksgiving. Demand was so overwhelming that Jones sold out within two hours, the bottles (both full and empty) fetching in excess of $10 a piece on auction sites such as eBay.

=== 2004 ===
In 2004, it offered a complete, drinkable Thanksgiving dinner—five bottles—as a box set for $16. Turkey & Gravy was brought back, and the rest of the flavors were unique to this offering: Green Bean Casserole, Cranberry, Mashed Potatoes with Butter, and Fruitcake. The limited-edition pack sold out in under an hour, temporarily crashing the company's email and Internet servers. As in 2003, people resold some seasonal bottles on auction sites such as eBay, with bids reaching as high as $100 a pack. Jones Soda's profits in both years were donated to the charity Toys for Tots.

=== 2005 ===
In 2005, Jones released Halloween Limited Edition 8 oz. can 4-packs, exclusively through Target. The four flavors included two originals (Candy Corn and Caramel Apple), as well as two renamed flavors (Strawberry Slime and Scary Berry Lemonade).

Flavors released at the end of October 2005 in many Target stores (and, eventually, via the Jones Soda website) included, as in 2004, five different varieties. "Turkey & Gravy" and "Cranberry" made a return from 2004, with three new additions: Wild Herb Stuffing, Pumpkin Pie, and Brussels sprout. A list of wines, half-humorously included on a label on the front of the box, offered suggestions that would "match" with said flavors.

A second limited edition collection was also created in 2005, in part to celebrate the Seattle regional aspect of the company. This collection was also made available in other places across the United States, including select Speedway, Kroger, and Cost Plus World Market stores. The flavors differed from the first 2005 limited edition and included in addition to Turkey & Gravy; Smoked Salmon Pâté, Corn on the Cob, Broccoli Casserole, and for dessert, Pecan Pie. As in years past, all profits from the Holiday Pack collections went to charities, in this case St. Jude's Research Hospital and Toys for Tots.

=== 2006 ===
In February 2006, Jones introduced the first Valentines Pack. Each pack contained two bottles of "Love Potion #6" soda, a Love Potion No. 6 flavored lip balm, a three-track sampler CD, a book of "Love Coupons", and a coupon for two free bottles of customized myJones. In addition to selling the packs through retailers and their website, Jones partnered with the non-profit organization, Operation AC, to donate 10,000 packs to U.S. troops stationed in Afghanistan and Iraq.

In September 2006, Jones released the 10th Anniversary Pack, which included two "current favorites" (Green Apple and Blue Bubblegum), and two "original favorites" (Pineapple Upside Down and Raspberry), along with a Hot Wheels version of a Jones Van. The bottles were printed with special foil detailing and each pack was numbered with only 10,500 ever made, available only by ordering through their website.

The Halloween cans were available again in 2006 with the return of Candy Corn and Berried Alive (formerly Scary Berry Lemonade) and the new Spider Cider and Gruesome Grape (a renamed version of their regular flavor, MF Grape). Along with the cans, Limited Edition bottles were available in three flavors: Monster Mojito, Lemon Drop Dead, and Creepy Cranberry. Unlike previous Limited Edition bottles, these were available in the normal 4-pack carriers rather than special packages. Also in October 2006, Jones released the Berries and Cream Limited Edition pack to raise awareness for the Breast Cancer Recovery Foundation.

The 2006 Holiday Pack introduced some new flavors in addition to the now-classic Turkey & Gravy, including Sweet Potato, Dinner Roll, Pea, and Antacid (which included a disclaimer stating it had no medicinal qualities). The second 2006 pack was dubbed the Dessert Pack and included Cherry Pie, Banana Cream Pie, Key Lime Pie, Apple Pie, and Blueberry Pie. Proceeds once again went to St. Jude's and Toys for Tots. Three additional flavors (Egg Nog, Sugar Plum, and Candy Cane) were also created in 4-packs similar to the special Halloween bottles.

=== 2007 ===
In 2007 Jones Soda again sold the Valentines Pack, including the two bottles of Love Potion No. 6, a pair of Jones-branded boxer shorts, a box of Necco Conversation hearts, and a "Spin the Bottle" board printed on the back of the box.

In preparation for the Seattle Seahawks' 2007 season, Jones offered a limited-edition Seahawks pack starting on September 27. The collectors' pack included sodas flavored in Perspiration, Sports Cream, Natural Field Turf, Dirt, and Sweet Victory. In the Pacific Northwest, Jones labeled their regular sodas with Seahawks-themed pictures during the 2007 football season.

The Halloween edition mini-cans returned in October, featuring the new flavor Sour Lemon Drop Dead, along with returning flavors Candy Corn, Strawberry Slime, and Gruesome Grape. Three Target-exclusive flavors were also released: new flavors Black Cat Licorice (Black Licorice) and Dread Licorice (Red Licorice), along with returning flavor Monster Mojito.

Around Thanksgiving, Jones again released three flavors for the Holidays, exclusively at Target stores. Christmas Cocoa, Candy Cane, and Gingerbread each came in a 4-bottle carry pack. Additionally, the Dessert Pack was re-released with new flavor Lemon Meringue Pie, plus returning flavors Apple Pie, Cherry Pie, and Blueberry Pie.

In place of their annual Thanksgiving pack, Jones released two new holiday-themed sets. The 2007 Jones Holiday Packs offered choices for both Christmas and Chanukah. The 2007 Christmas Pack included new flavors Christmas Ham and Christmas Tree, along with returning flavors Egg Nog and Sugar Plum, with proceeds benefiting Toys for Tots. The 2007 Happy Hanukkah Pack was a four-bottle set of Latke, Applesauce, Chocolate Coins, and Jelly Doughnut sodas, and included "1 completely functional dreidel;" proceeds from Chanukah Pack sales benefited Vitamin Angels. Both holiday packs contained no caffeine. All sodas, including the ham-flavored soda, were certified kosher.

=== 2008 ===
For the first time, Jones released three new flavors in celebration of Easter: Robin's Egg Lemonade, Chocolate Bunny, and Little Bunny Fufu. A portion of the proceeds benefited Vitamin Angels.

In April, Jones Soda ran a contest called the 10,000th label contest. Where fans would vote for their favorite photo of the Top 20 that Jones Soda picked. The winner would have the honor of their photo being on a special edition bottle. With over 5,000 votes cast, this is Jones Soda's most popular contest so far.

In October Jones released, through Target, four 8 oz. Halloween soda cans came in four-packs. The flavors were paired with Classic movie monsters for each flavor. Lemon Drop Dead was the Mummy, Spooookiwi was Frankenstein's monster, Candy Corn was the Wolf-man, and Buried Pomegranate was Count Dracula. Jones also came out with three 12 oz. glass bottle of Halloween soda consisting of Dread Apple, Blood Orange, and Monster Mojito.

Also in October, the company laid off 42 of its 110 employees, partly the result of the company's expansion into the canned-soda market where it competed directly against Coca-Cola and Pepsi.

In November Jones released exclusively at Target stores three 12oz glass bottle Holiday sodas including Candy Cane, Pear Tree, Mele Kalikimaka (a pineapple and coconut combo), or "Merry Christmas" in Hawaiian. Jones also exclusively released on their website a six-pack of Green Apple, Red Apple, and Cream Soda as a Holiday color combo. Another net exclusive was the Apple Pie, Cherry Pie, and Blueberry Pie six-pack not so different from last year's dessert pack.

In December Jones released their Hanukkah Pack was a four-bottle set of Latke, Applesauce, Chocolate Coins, and Jelly Doughnut sodas, and included "1 completely functional dreidel".

=== 2009 ===
To commemorate Barack Obama's inauguration, Jones released a new 'Orange You Glad For Change' orange cola flavor, available from their website.

In February, Love Potion No. 6 was also made available from the official Jones website.

In June, Internet radio station Punk Radio Cast teamed up with Jones Soda to create a punk-pop 6 pack featuring labels designed by PunkRadioCast and five punk artists – New Found Glory, Less Than Jake, Bad Brains, Thursday, and The Gaslight Anthem. The 6-pack includes:

- Less Than Jake – Root Beer
- The Gaslight Anthem – Cream Soda
- New Found Glory – Fufu Berry
- Bad Brains – Rootz Beer
- Thursday – Cream Soda
- Punk Radio Cast – Strawberry Lime

When Magic: The Gathering released a new core card set in July, Jones Soda coordinated to produce five limited edition bottles featuring Magic's five colors of mana and artwork from Magic's new Planeswalkers. The five sodas are titled Elixir of Purity (Cream Soda), Necromancer's Tonic (Root Beer), Beast Brew (Green Apple), Illusion Infusion (Blue Bubblegum), and Purifying Firewater (Fruit Punch).

An exclusive set of bottles based on Dungeons & Dragons, called 'Spellcasting Soda' was made available through the official Jones website. Sodas were titled Illithid Brain Juice, Sneak Attack, Potion of Healing, Dwarven Draught, Bigby's Crushing Thirst Destroyer, and Eldritch Blast.

Halloween brought a return of several promotional flavors, exclusively at Target. Four-bottle packs of Monster Mojito, Dread Apple, and Blood Orange made a return. Four-can packs of Buried Pomegranate, Strawberry Slime, Lemon Drop Dead, Spookiwi, and Candy Corn were also re-released.

For Thanksgiving, the company introduced a new Tofurky and Gravy flavored soda that's intended for vegetarians as an alternative option to turkey. A portion of proceeds were donated to the Progressive Animal Welfare Society (PAWS). The drink was also featured on an episode of The Tonight Show with Conan O'Brien in a segment where band member Richie "LaBamba" Rosenberg (after Andy Richter refused to drink it) tried and disliked it.

=== 2013 ===
In 2013, Jones Soda created a poutine-flavored limited-edition soft drink, which got international popular culture attention.

In addition, the Halloween flavors were brought back for the fall season. The flavors this year included Return of Candy Corn, Terror of Blood Orange, Dawn of Caramel Apple, and Night of Red Licorice.

=== 2014 ===
To coincide with the back-to-school season, Jones Soda announced a limited-edition Peanut Butter and Jelly flavor.

Blood Orange and Caramel Apple returned for the Halloween season with similar packaging to 2013's designs, but Red Licorice and Candy Corn were absent from the 2014 limited edition lineup of flavors.

=== 2015 ===
Peanut Butter and Jelly returned once again for the back-to-school season, while Blood Orange and Lemon Drop Dead were back for Halloween. A Thanksgiving favorite, Pumpkin Pie, also returned in 2015.

2015 also saw Jones Soda teaming up with video game publisher Bethesda to make a signature soft drink from one of Bethesda's games slated for release in November. Nuka-Cola Quantum from the Fallout series went on sale on November 10 at participating Target locations in North America alongside the release of Bethesda's game Fallout 4.

=== 2016 ===
Christmas themed soda returned in 2016 with Candy Cane, Sugar Plum, Pear Tree, and Gingerbread flavors.

== Labels ==
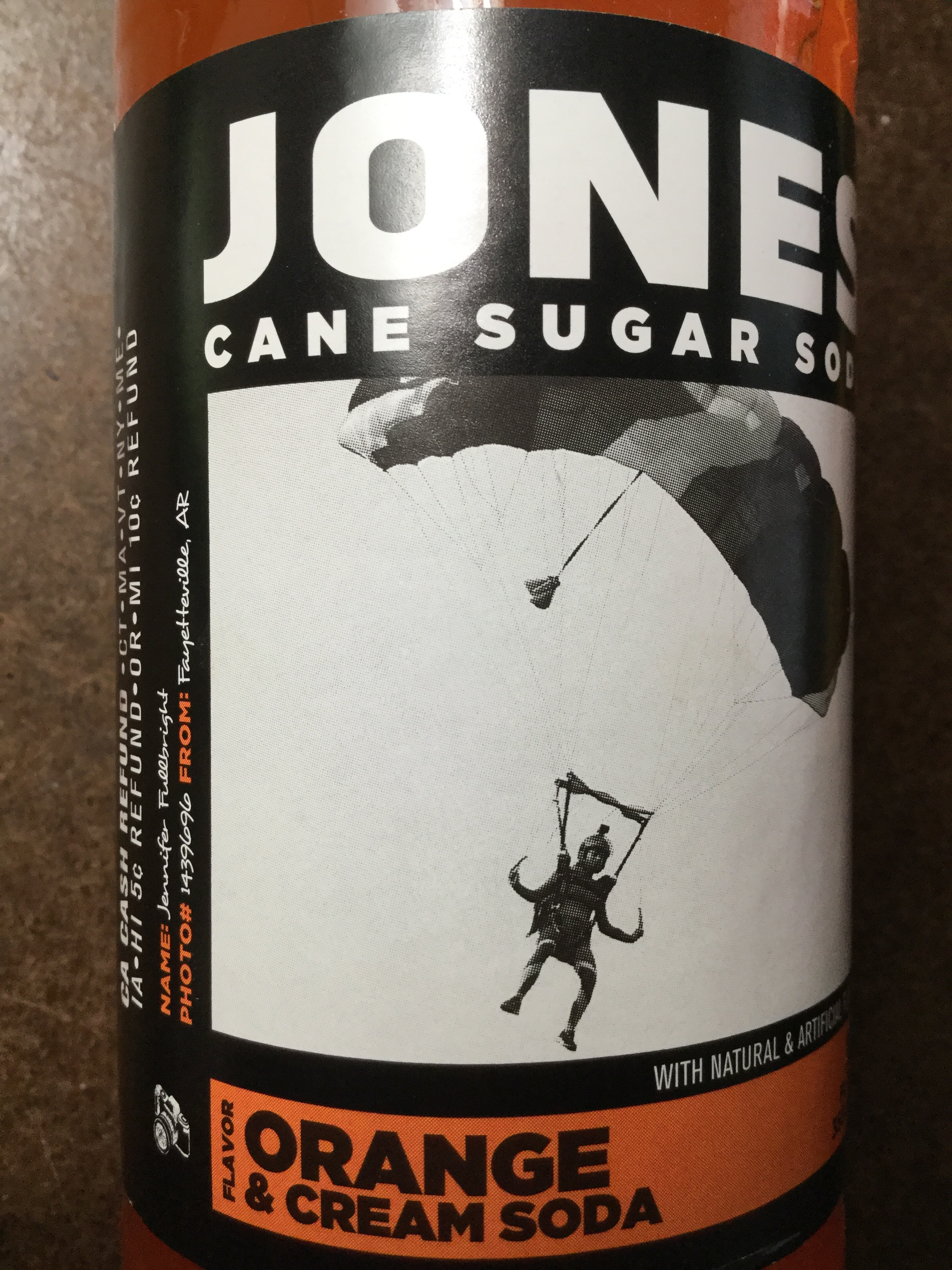
Jennifer Fullbright photographs have been featured on more than one million bottles. She is seen in this image skydiving at an event in her hometown of Fayetteville, Arkansas.

Jones Soda continually changes the photographs on its Soda and Naturals labels. The photos are generally black and white. Its website features a database of over one million submitted pictures, as well as an archived collection of internal company notes, detailing which pictures appeared when, on what flavors (for collectors of the images). Customers can also submit fortunes (similar to a fortune cookie) to be printed underneath the bottle cap.

The website sometimes asks for specific themes for photo uploads like the Patriot Photos or the Landmark Contest in order to create a special collection of labels. Recently, they have created a Signature series that includes photos and written signatures of Jones Soda Pro Athletes.

== Marketing ==
Rather than television commercials or magazine ads, Jones chooses to focus on product placement. Athletes such as Benji Weatherley, Matt Hoffman, and Bam Margera, known as Jones Pro Riders, promote Jones by appearing with the logo (or often the actual product) at various events or on television appearances. Another group of athletes, the Jones Emerging Athletes, also support Jones.

On May 23, 2007, the Seattle Seahawks chose Jones Soda as its official soft drink, and its products were sold at Qwest Field from the 2007 through the 2009 season. During the football season, Jones Soda also produced bottles labeled with photos of Seahawks players for sale both at football games and in supermarkets. The Seahawks previously sold soft drinks from The Coca-Cola Company; the Jones Soda deal made the team the first in the NFL to sign an exclusive deal with a soft drink company other than Coca-Cola or Pepsi. In June 2010, the Seahawks severed their association with Jones Soda and announced that they had signed a five-year agreement with Coca-Cola.

On February 12, 2008, Alaska Airlines and Horizon Air announced they would serve Jones Soda on their flights. This arrangement ended March 1, 2010, when Alaska and Horizon switched to serving Coca-Cola products. The airlines cited customer demand as the reason.

== See also ==
- Rocket Fizz – a company that produces unique flavors of soft drinks
