= Pegas Touristik =

Russian travel agency

Pegas Touristik Пегас Туристик
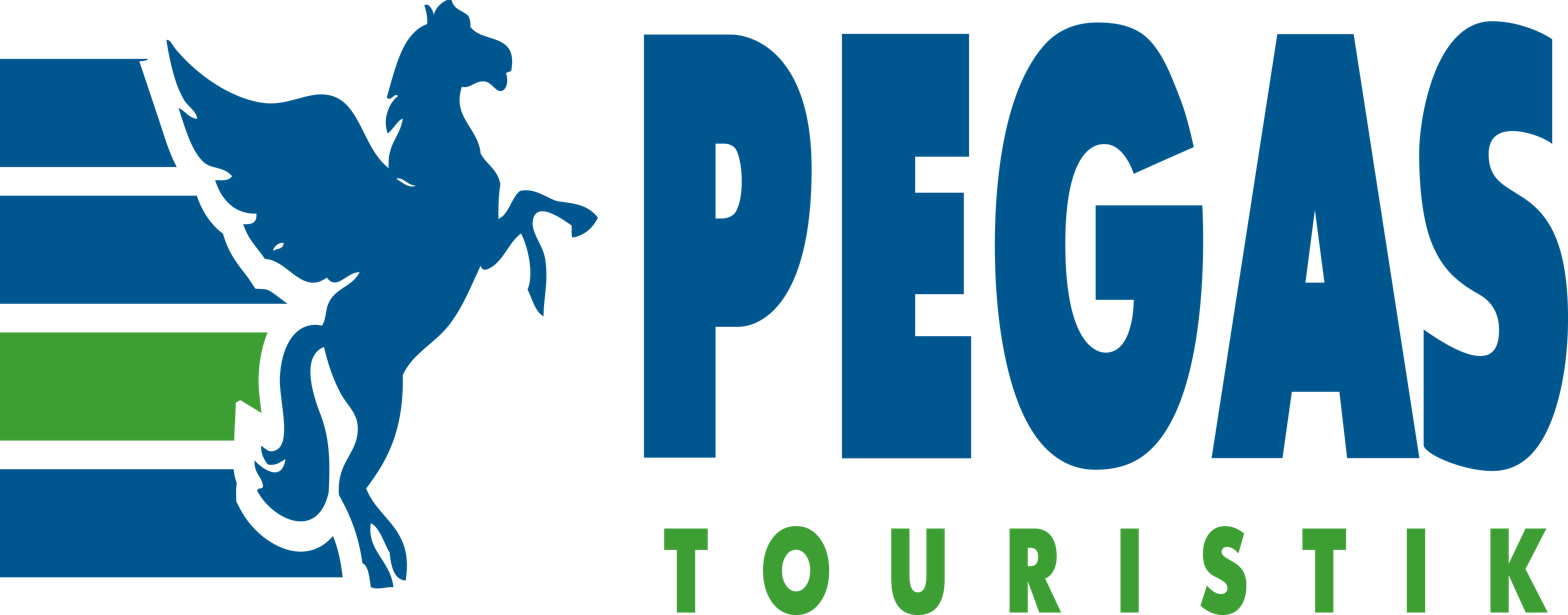
- Industry: Hospitality, Tourism
- Founded: 1994; 32 years ago
- Headquarters: Moscow, Russia
- Area served: Global
- Key people: Podgornaya Anna Albertovna (CEO)
- Products: Charter and scheduled passenger airlines, package holidays, cruise lines, hotels and resorts
- Services: Travel agencies
- Revenue: $670 million (2008)
- Website: pegast.ru

Pegas Touristik (Russian: Пегас Туристик) is a Russian tour operator. Its head office is located in Moscow. The company was launched in 1994.

In Russian regions, Pegas Touristik has over 50 offices of tourism. Moreover, Pegas Touristik is represented in Ukraine, Belarus, Georgia and in Kazakhstan. The company has its offices of accepting tourists in Turkey, Egypt, Thailand, Vietnam, China, UAE and Israel.

== Head and ownership ==
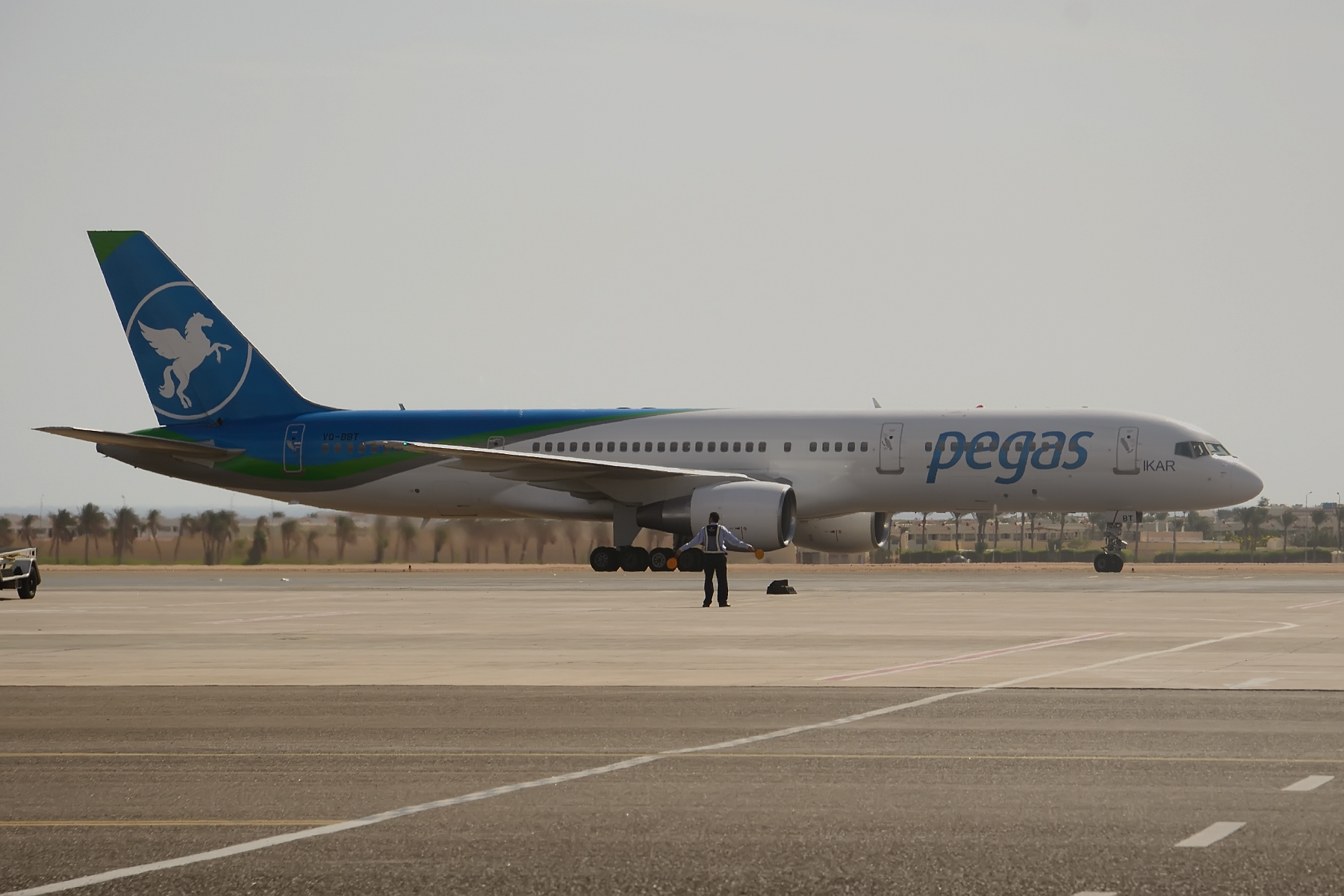
Pegas Fly Boeing 757-200

"Pegas Touristik" is based on the investment principal owner - Ramazan Akpınar, who initially cooperated with the Turkish company Infotur, but in 2005 broke the relations, because of the conflict of relationship.

== Activity ==
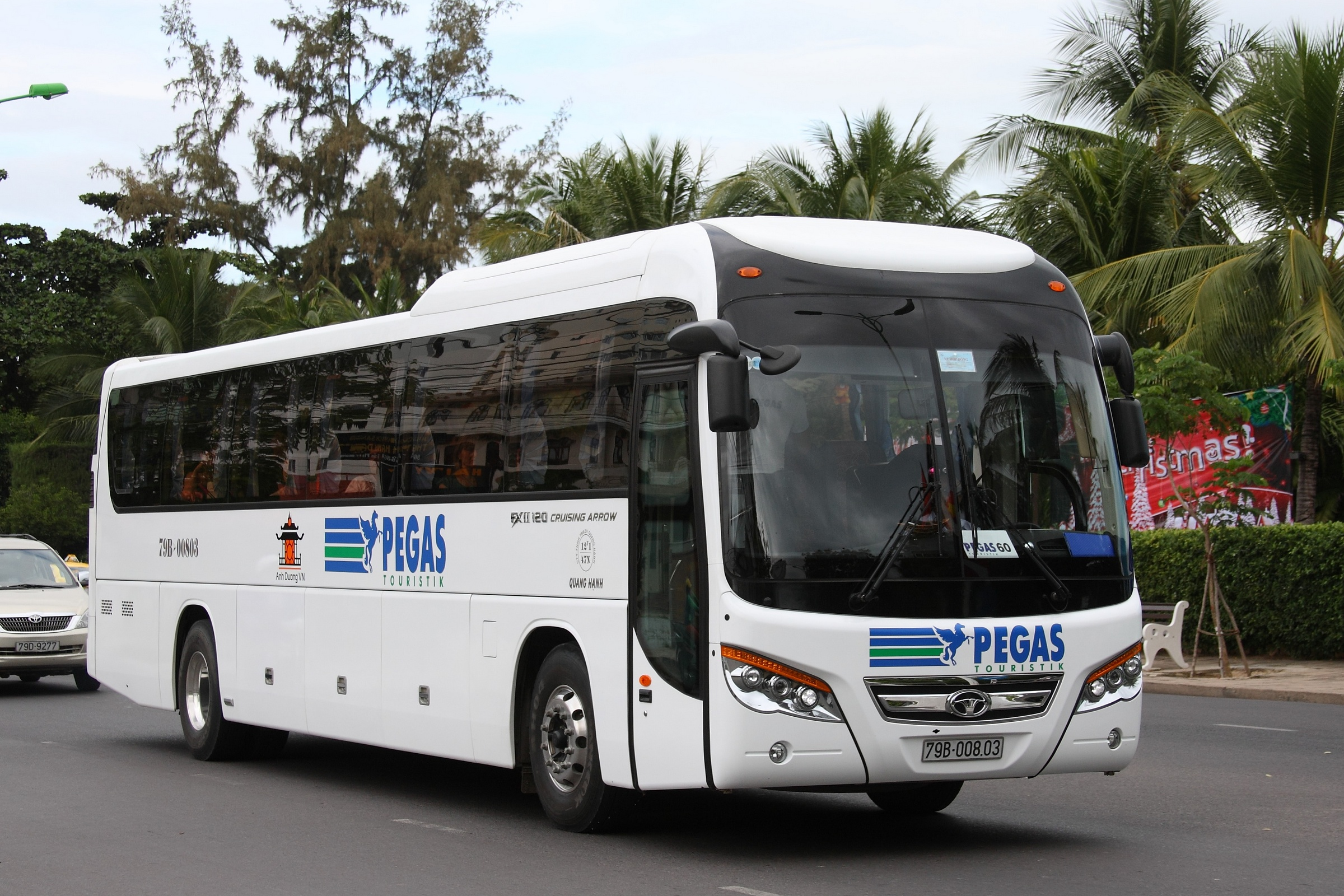
Pegas Touristik Bus in Nha Trang, Vietnam

In 2008, the company served 870 thousand tourists, and the total income was $670 million.

In summer 2008, Pegas Touristik bought 100% of Nordwind Airlines. As the result of the contract between the tourist company and the airline, Nordwind Airlines became personal for Pegas Touristik airline and personal terminal in Moscow-Sheremetyevo Terminal C.

In December 2008, Pegas Touristik absorbed the Ural-based tour operator "Оранж Тур (Orange Tour)". Since 2008, Pegas Touristik began to buy popular hotels in Turkey, Thailand and Egypt to form its own group of hotels. As in 2015, it has sold one of its PGS World Palace 5* to the company Alva Donna.

In November 2015, due to the Metrojet Aircrash in Egypt, which was recognised as a terrorist attack, and due to the Turkish downing of a Russian Air Force plane, Pegas Touristik, along with other big tourist companies in Russia, suspended all their tours to Egypt and Turkey, in accordance with a decree by the Russian government. Following improved relations, tours to Turkey were reinstated in June 2016. Tours to Egypt resumed shortly after the suspension of flights to Sharm El Sheikh and Hurghada were lifted in August 2021 (via its subsidiary Nordwind Airlines).

On 30 December 2015, the Federal Agency of Tourism excluded Pegas Touristik and other tourist companies from one group of tourist operators.

Pegas Touristik maintains close operational links with Nordwind Airlines, which has served as a key subsidiary for its charter-based holiday operations. Following the escalation of the Russo-Ukrainian War in 2022, Nordwind became subject to extensive restrictions, including bans on access to European airspace and limitations arising from broader aviation sanctions imposed by the European Union and other jurisdictions. These measures disrupted the operations of Russian tour operators, prompting a shift toward destinations such as Turkey and Egypt and increased reliance on non-Russian carriers.

In this context, Southwind Airlines, a Turkish-based leisure airline established in 2022, emerged as a significant operator on Russia-linked leisure routes, although its rapid expansion attracted regulatory scrutiny in parts of Europe over concerns regarding potential links to Nordwind Airlines and the circumvention of aviation restrictions. While Southwind has not generally been designated under formal sanctions regimes, restrictions imposed by some European authorities reflect broader efforts to limit indirect circumvention of sanctions on Russian aviation.

== Awards ==
- International award "My Planet". Nomination "My favourite Tour Operator". Moscow, 2011.

== Incidents ==
- Accident of the bus with Russian tourists in Antalya. 25 May 2010.
- Bus flipped in Thailand. 11 October 2013
