= Azomureș (photosensitive materials) =

Azomureș AZO
- Azomureș (photosensitive materials) logo
- Produced by: Combinatul de Îngrășăminte Azotoase Târgu-Mureș, from 1990 called "Azomureș"
- Country: Romania
- Introduced: 1981
- Discontinued: 2003
- Markets: Romania and other
- Previous owners: A photographic paper factory was founded in 1947 by two Hungarian brothers. It was nationalized in 1950 and transformed into a cooperative and later it was taken over completely by the Romanian state.
- Website: azomures.com (Web Archive)

Azomureș (or AZO) was the only brand of photosensitive materials from Romania, produced by Combinatul de Îngrășăminte Azotoase Târgu-Mureș (Târgu-Mureș Nitrogenous Fertilizer Plant) between 1981 and 2003.

The photographic materials were made in a separate section of the chemical plant, in the northern part of Târgu Mureș, using Japanese licensed production. The decision to locate the factory in this city was based on the tradition in photographic art and the existence of an older company in the field.

The main products were black and white and color photographic paper and films for general photography, industrial and medical use and black and white and color cinematographic films.

The factory has stood out as one of the newest companies of its kind in the world.

Due to low demand for film in the early 2000s, outdated production technology and debt, the department was closed in 2003.

== History ==
=== Context ===
In Târgu Mureș (formerly known by its Hungarian name, Marosvásárhely) there has been a tradition in the field of photography since the 19th century, in 1865 Péter Ciehulszki taking and processing a series of photographs in his own studio. In the following period, other workshops and studios were opened, which led to the creation in 1905 of Amatőr Fényképészek Egyesületének (Amateur Photographers Association).

On October 8, 1933, the largest photographic exhibition organized by Erdélyi Kárpát-egyesület (Transylvanian Carpathian Society) took place in Târgu Mureș, where 205 photographs were included in the following groups: landscapes, portraits, specifics, specials and beginners. The president of the exhibition, Gábor Szijgyártó, stated that "the competitors gathered showed such a great sense in the art of photography, vision and perfect technical training that we rarely find anything like this at similar exhibitions in Western cosmopolitan cities."

In the early 1950s, József Marx (photojournalist for Új Élet at the invitation of editor-in-chief András Sütő) offered several local amateur photographers the opportunity to send their photos to exhibitions in the country and abroad, founding in 1953 the Photo Club (Hungarian: Marosvásárhelyi Fotóklub), as one of the artistic circles of the Palace of Culture from Târgu Mureș. In 1958 they organized the first national exhibition.

=== Photo paper factory ===
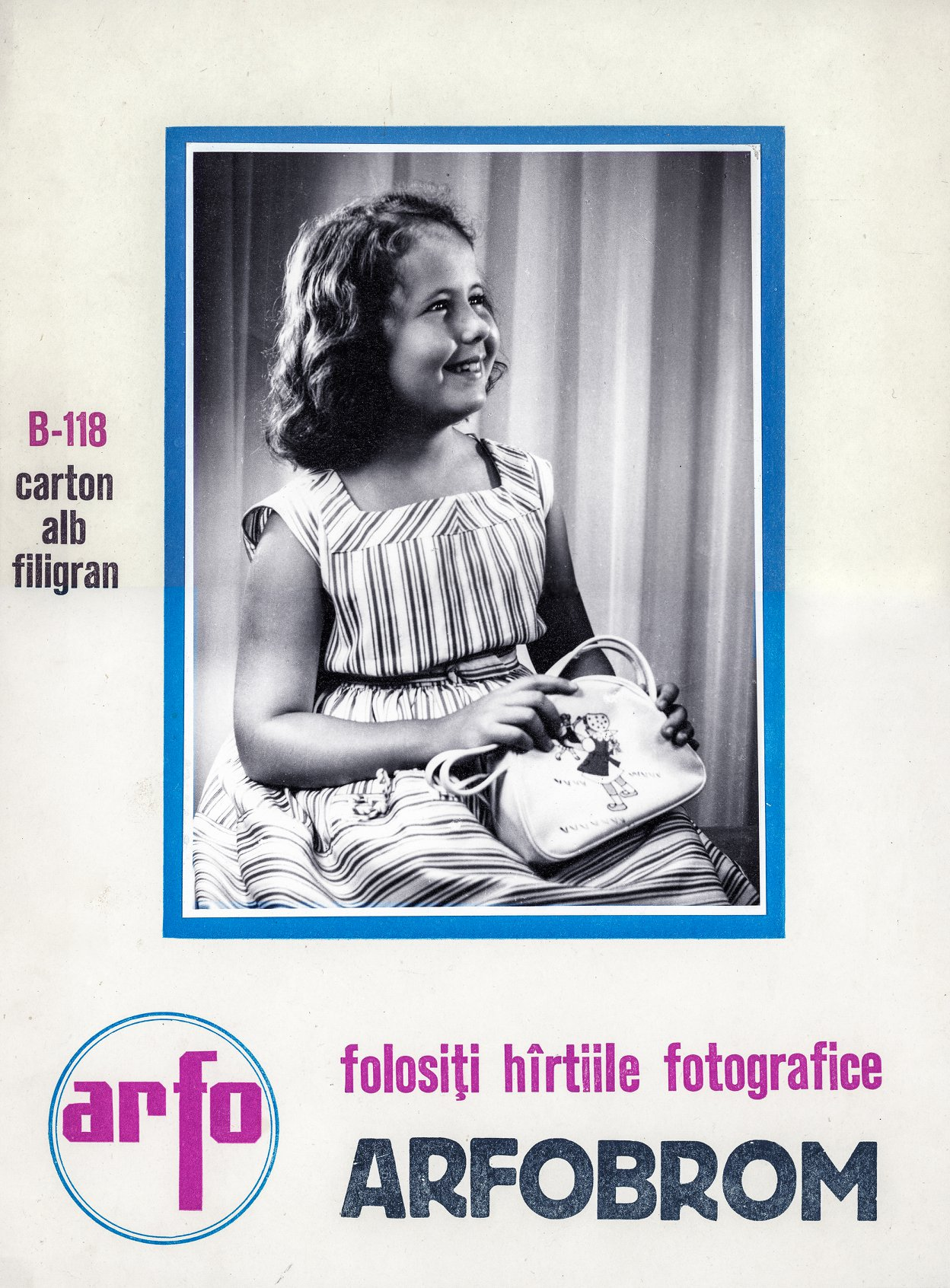
Arfobrom B-118 photo paper advertisement

After World War II, professional and amateur photographers resumed their work, but those who used to use the products of the German photographic industry (Kodak, Agfa) faced a significant shortage of film and photo paper. Thus, brothers Imre and Attila Horváth from Târgu Mureș, with the help of a sister of theirs and the brother-in-law who both had a photo studio, set up a laboratory in a garage on Baross Gábor Street (now Horea) for production of photographic paper called IMAGO, in 1947.

Following nationalization, in the autumn of 1950 IMAGO ceased to exist and was replaced by the photo paper section of the local industrial cooperative "Ödön Lázár", a section arranged in an apartment of Lázár Ödön's sister. Attila was director of the unit, Imre technical director and Erzsébet Nagyné Logyin laboratory technician. The main production equipment was made by Imre in the workshop of a local technical school. In 1951, the Romanian state allocated 20 million lei for the construction of a new factory, being completed in 1953 in Piața Mărășești Street (today being the headquarters of the Mureș Department of Agriculture). Other installations were designed by the factory technician, the technical and investment department of the "Ödön Lázár" company provided assistance and their manufacture was ensured to the craft cooperative "Minszki Lajos" and the central workshop of the company to which the photo factory belonged. Another 8 employees also took qualification courses.

The management has started a six-month professional qualification course for both employees and those who have not yet worked there, in arithmetic, technical drawing, chemistry and photographic technology, to train the first technicians in the photographic paper industry in the country.

The engineers at the factory [Azomureș] approached him [Imre Horváth] many times at home, brought him some colored paper and then asked for his advice. He was pleased with the gift, he was happy to give advice. He would have given them advice without bringing anything. It was a great pain that he was never invited to the new factory belonging to the Azomureș plant. […] He had said many times before that no one had called him to the new factory to see at least what had happened to what he had dreamed. He did not want success or any kind of recognition. He just wanted to see.

— György Kovács, employee of Imre Horváth

The investment in the new factory was aimed at being able to meet the need for photographic paper at the country level, without the need for imports. Semi-glossy and matte paper with silver bromide and seismometer paper was produced. In 1955, the first automatic postcard copier in the country was made. In the second five-year plan, it was proposed to fully cover the needs and produce new paper variants for electrocardiography, seismography and polarography.

In 1956, by a decision of the Council of Ministers, the "Nicolae Teclu" Factory from Copșa Mică took over the section. In 1962, the photographic paper factory was attached as a section of the "Karl Marx" Chemical Plant from Târnăveni, further developing its production under the name ARFO.

According to journalist Zoltán Bakó from Székelyhon.ro, Imre Horváth had 50 inventions between 1947 and 1972, but not patented.

=== Photosensitive materials factory ===
The factory located in the Unirii neighborhood of Târgu Mureș

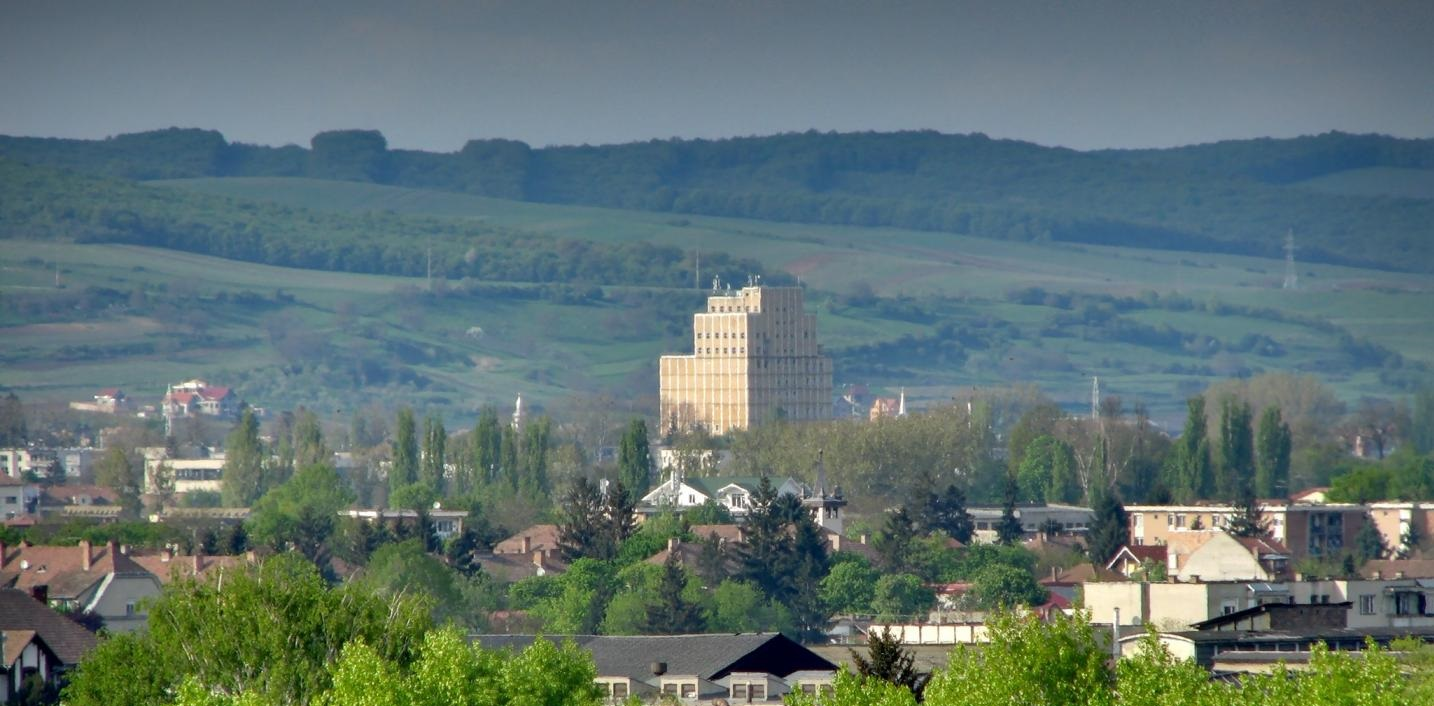
View from 2008

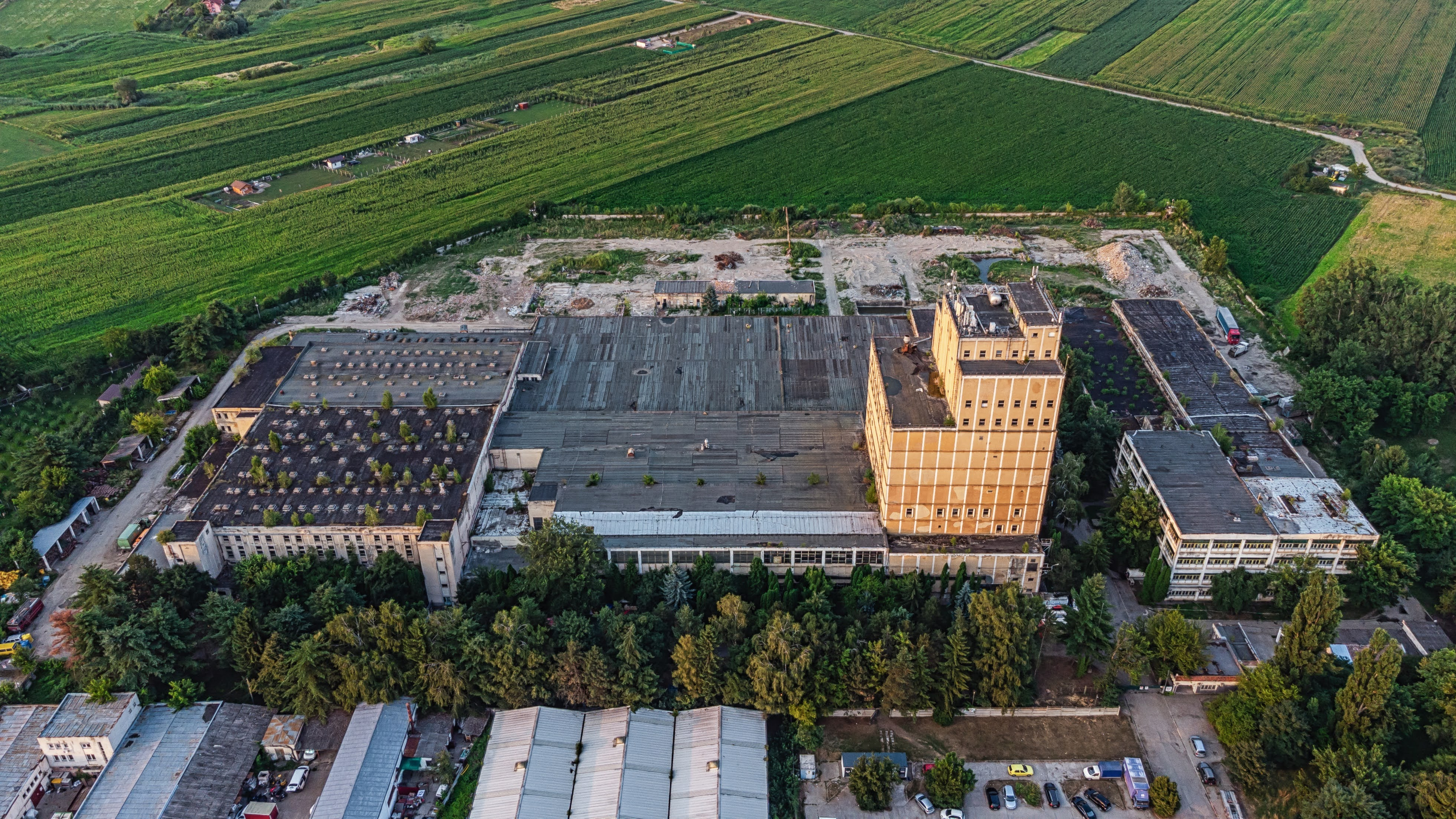
Aerial view from 2021

Taking into account the existing tradition in the field of photography, the communist state government decided to build a factory comprising a wide range of photosensitive materials to meet the needs of industry, health, advertising and art. In 1981 the factory of photosensitive materials within the Târgu-Mureș Nitrogen Fertilizer Plant was put into operation, the section building being designed by the Japanese company Fujitsu to withstand an earthquake of maximum 9.4 degrees on the Richter scale. Construction began in 1974. The platform of the Photosensitive Materials Plant was located in the northern part of the city, 2.5 km (1.6 mi) away from the urban center, having an area of about 7 hectares (17 acres). The technology and products of the factory were licensed in Japan by Konishiroku.

The detergent company from Timișoara started to produce the chemical solutions necessary for the photographic processing.

The plant has been noted as the only Romanian producer of films and photo products but also one of the newest companies of photosensitive materials in the world. Until 1989, the films produced dominated the Romanian market, with demand in film studios and radiology departments of hospitals across the country. The products were also used by members of the Association of Photographic Artists, photojournalists of the Romanian Press Agency (Agerpres), specialists of the Photo Art Studio of the Casa Scînteii, photographs of research institutes, etc.

At the 15th edition of the Bucharest International Fair, organized in the Exhibition Complex in Piața Scînteii on October 14, 1989, there was also a stand for Azomureș photosensitive materials, where the products were presented: AZO-X orthochromatic medical radiographic film, industrial radiographic film for nuclear use Gamagraf NG1, NG2, NG 3, negative color film Azocolor 100.

==== Bankruptcy ====
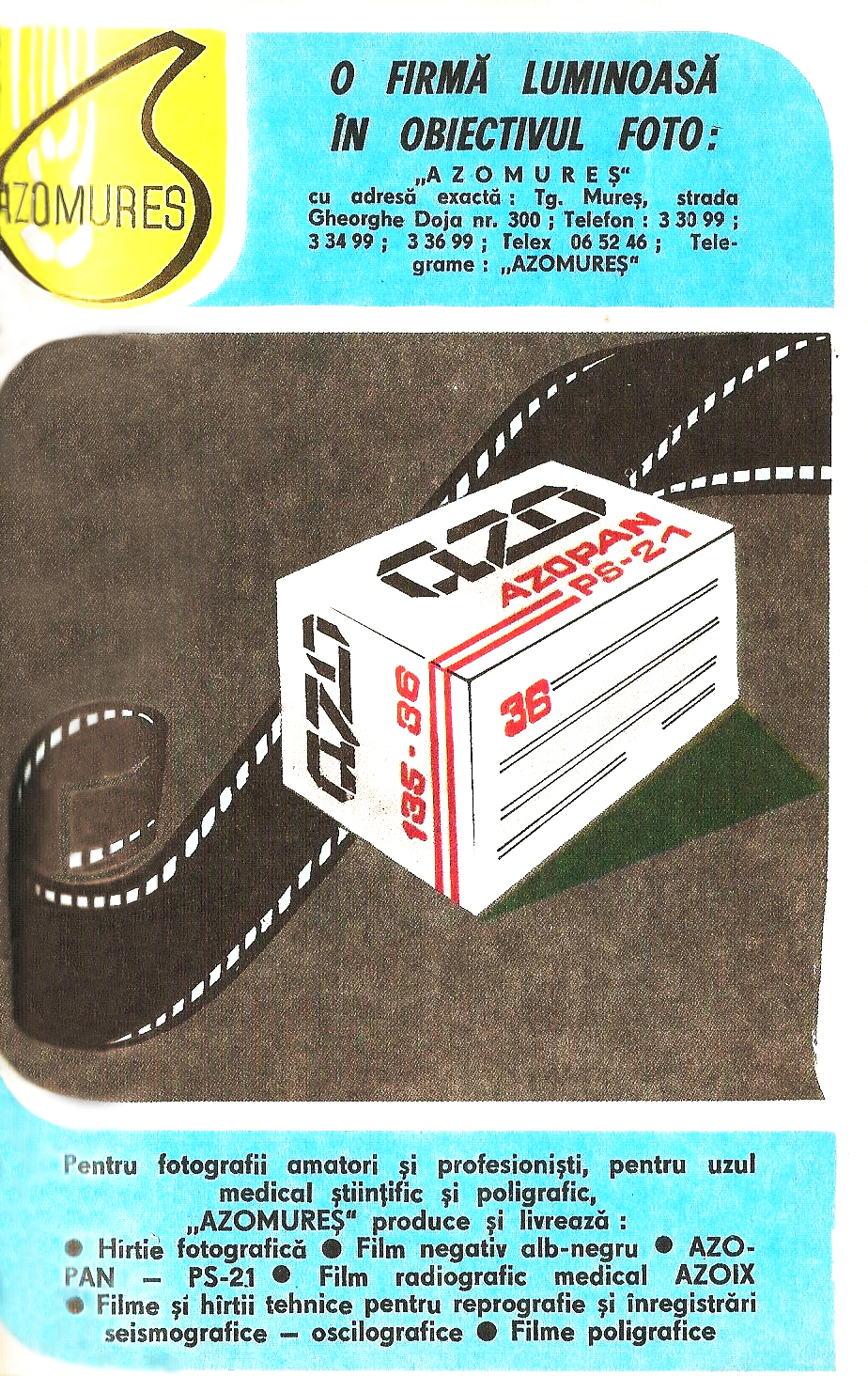
Commercial in Almanah Scînteia in 1981

According to a communiqué from Azomureș sent to the Bucharest Stock Exchange, the General Meeting of Shareholders of the company convened at the end of April 2003, decided, following the analysis of the activity of some subunits, to close the photosensitive materials plant.

One reason for the closure was the competition with large companies in the field that developed local distribution systems after 1989 on the Romanian market. The main competitors were: Agfa-Gevaert, Fujifilm, Eastman Kodak, Polaroid and 3M, which developed their promotion campaigns, a technique successfully implemented in the underdeveloped local market. Film sales from other companies increased after 1998, but also with the evolution of the gray and black market.

In the late 1990s, companies disputed the market at the beginning of each summer, during the holidays and vacations. According to an estimate from that time, approximately 60% of film sales, regardless of the producer, were concentrated in June, July and August, with the most used film being the one with sensitivity of 100 ASA and 36 frames.

According to Azomureș, the number of cameras per capita was among the lowest in Europe, and the consumption of photo films per capita was 10 times lower than the average in developed countries. According to the results of the Omnibus study of Mercury Research at the end of the 1990s, out of 1,500 respondents, only 30.4% used to take photos with their personal camera, while 43.9% did not have such a product. The data from the study also show that 47% of those who took photos were between 15 and 29 years old, 36% were between 30 and 44 years old, 23.6% were between 45 and 59 years old and 5.4% were over 60 years old.

Outdated plant production technology led to high production costs. Over time, Azomureș's products have come out of the attention of amateurs or specialized photo studios. On the other hand, after 1990, entire customer segments disappeared: student circles, factory clubs, syndicate clubs, student circles and associations of photographers and the tendency was to give up, for economic reasons, the processing done by the amateur photographer in their own laboratory and to access modern machining centers with mini-laboratories that eliminate manual processing. In this way, Azomureș, which produced only one type of negative color film (Azocolor 100), had to face competition from a diverse market of negative color films and sensitivities and focus on creating its own network of processing centers. color films. At the same time, the transition to digital photography has created other difficulties.

The representative of Azomureș, Yetkin Ernan, declared in 2003 that the main clients remained hospitals, clinics or radiology departments, but the hospitals registered long delays in the payment of materials or did not pay them anymore. Debts accumulated from non-payment amounted to several tens of billions of lei. The department produced 75% of the radiological films used in the Romanian health system.

With declining demand for photographic materials, high costs, and payment problems, there have been annual losses of about $500,000 a year in the factory's last five years. The factory was closed in 2003.

In the spring of 2007, the General Meeting of Shareholders, convened in an extraordinary meeting, decided to sell the production capacity of the photosensitive materials at a price of at least $10 million. However, in the autumn of the same year, the board of directors gave up the intention to sell the section in bulk due to the fact that the offers received were well below the price set by the General Meeting of Shareholders. Thus, it was decided to capitalize on the photosensitive materials section by selling scrap metal and installations, followed by decommissioning.

As the Azomureș management could not find a buyer for the department building, which was in a good state of preservation, the company decided in 2016 to transform some spaces to host cultural events.

The University of Arts in Târgu Mureș and the Transilvania Digital Innovation Center stated that they want to transform and recondition the spaces in the former factory, to set up a virtual museum of communism, a digital and experimental art center with video-multimedia departments, films and video installations. but also workshops for street art on digital themes and electronic music.

A digital archive of photographs taken in the country was created in January 2019, following the model of the Fortepan archive in Hungary.

Products

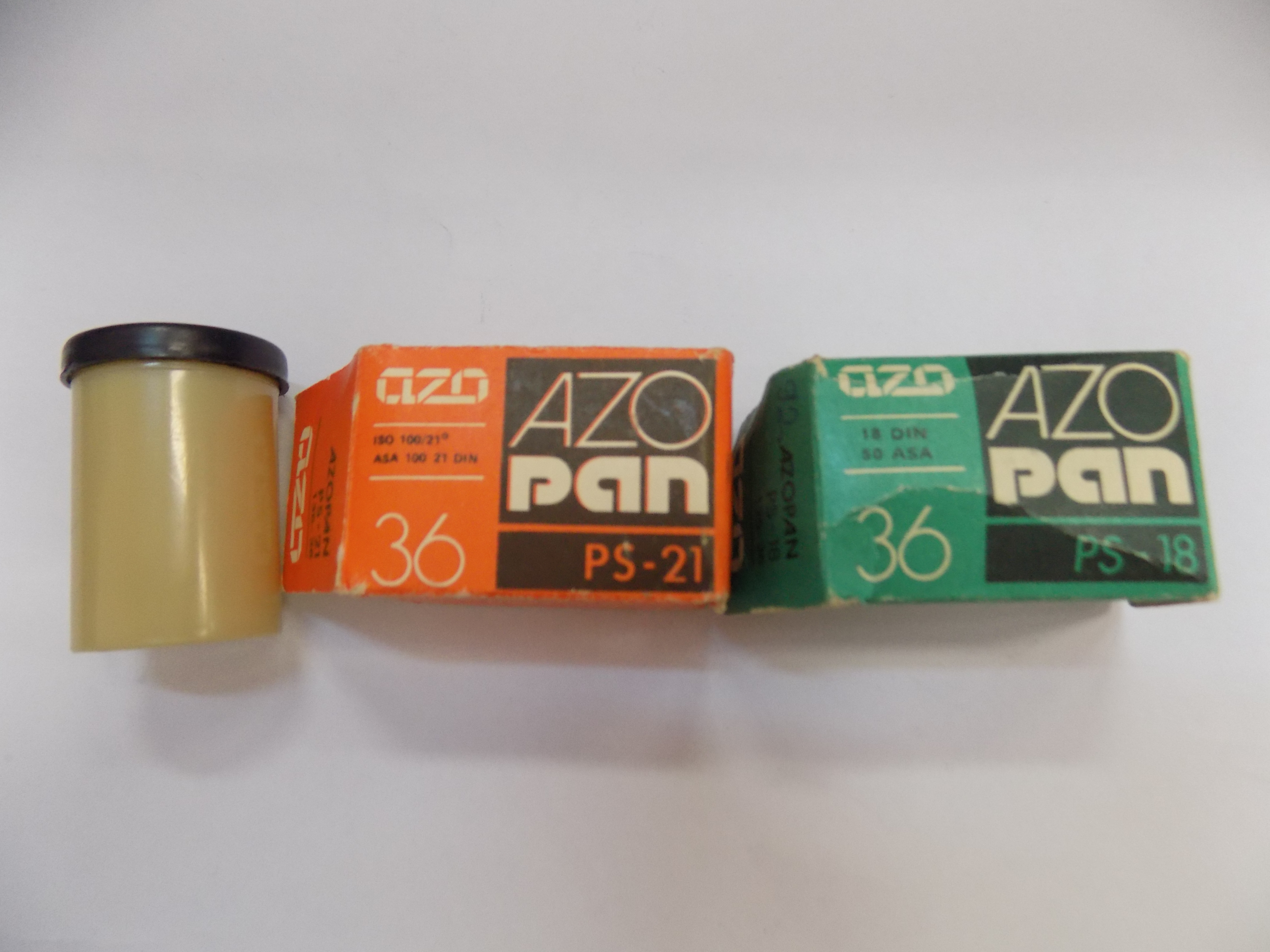
Packaging of black and white panchromatic negative films (cardboard and plastic boxes), Azopan PS-18 and PS-21 with 36 frames

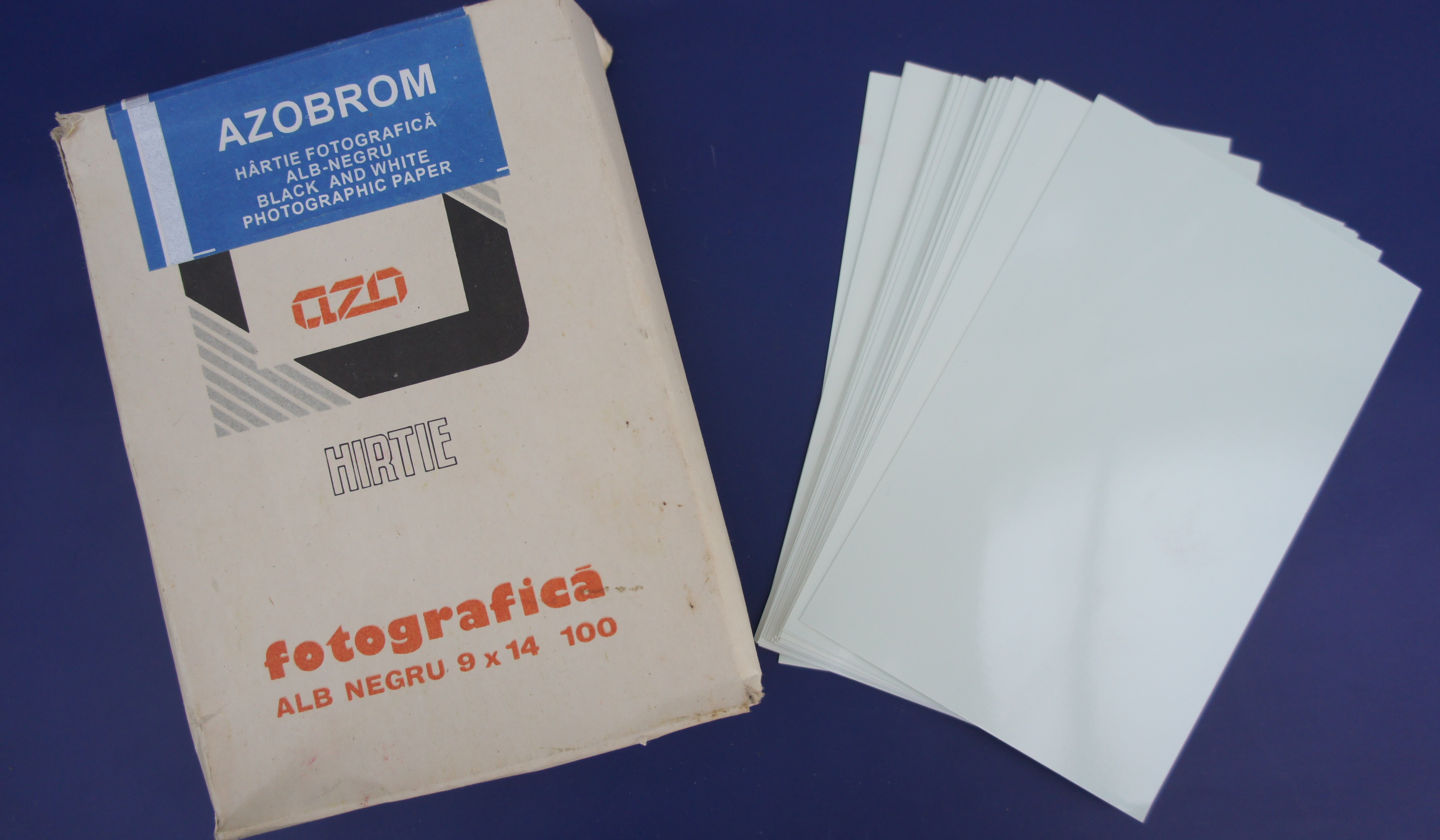
Azo 9x14 black and white photo paper box with 100 pieces

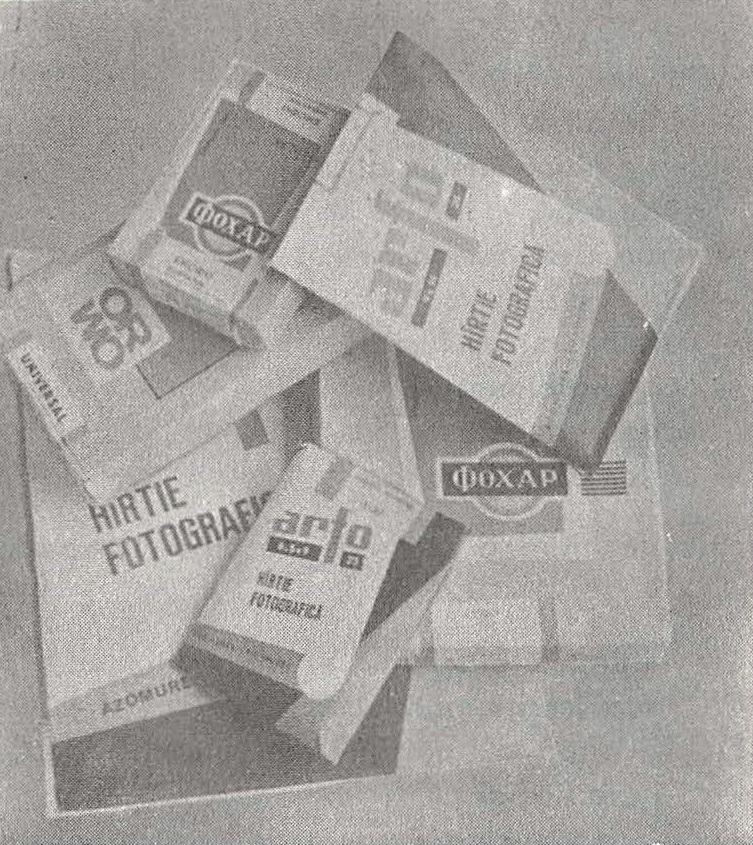
AZOMUREȘ photographic paper top (at the base). There are also an ARFO box, also produced in Târgu Mureș, Fohar (manufactured in People's Republic of Bulgaria) and ORWO (manufactured in German Democratic Republic)

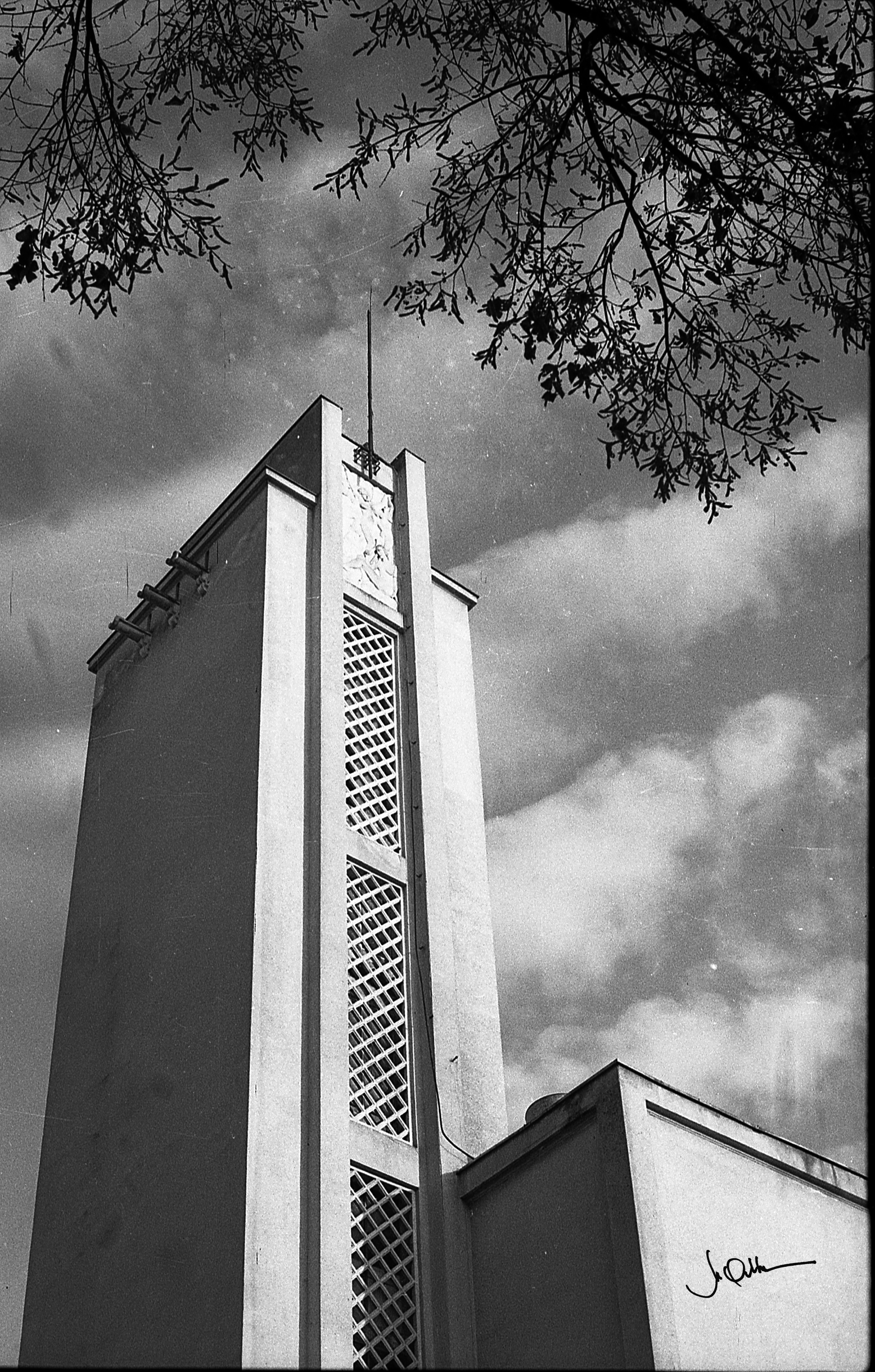
Black and white film photography taken in 1989 with Azopan PS 21, the subject is Academic College (Cluj-Napoca)
