= List of convertible tablet computer brands =

Brands are ordered alphabetically.

Brand	Model	Display	Processor	Memory (RAM)	Hard Drive	Price	Battery	Videos
Dell	Latitude XT3	12.1" LED Backlit	Intel CoreTM i7 (2640M) Intel CoreTM i5 (2520M); Intel CoreTM i3 (2330M); Note these processors are all Sandy Bridge, whereas Lenovo's processors include Ivy Bridge and the Lenovo prices are significantly less.	Up to 6GB5 DDR3 SDRAM at 1333Mhz - 2 DIMMS	Up to 320GB5 hard drive (7200RPM); Up to 256GB5 Solid State hard drive Up to 250GB5 hard drive (5400RPM)	$2,561	6-cell (44Wh) Lithium Ion battery 9-cell (76Wh) Lithium Ion Extended battery 9-cell (97Wh) Extended battery slice	
HP-Hawlett-Packard	EliteBook 2760p	12.1" LED Backlit	Intel Core i5-2520M (2.50 GHz, 3 MB L3 cache)	4 GB 1333 MHz DDR3 SDRAM	320 GB 7200 rpm SATA II	$1,399	N/A	
HP-Hawlett-Packard	EliteBook 2760p	12.1" LED Backlit	Intel Core i5-2540M (2.60 GHz, 3 MB L3 cache)	4 GB 1333 MHz DDR3 SDRAM	320 GB 7200 rpm SATA II	$2,099	N/A	
HP-Hawlett-Packard	EliteBook 2760p	12.1" LED Backlit	Intel Core i5-2520M (2.50 GHz, 3 MB L3 cache)	4 GB 1333 MHz DDR3 SDRAM	128 GB Solid State Drive	$2,549	N/A	
Fujitsu	LifeBook T901	13.3" WXGA	Intel Core i5-2520M vPro™ Processor (3M Cache, up to 3.20 GHz)	4GB	320 GB (7200 RPM / SATA)	$2,162	N/A	Release Vid; Cover features Touch-pad features Reviews [1] [2] [3]
Fujitsu	LifeBook T731	12.1" WXGA	Intel Core i5-2520M vPro™ Processor	2GB	250 GB (5,400 RPM / SATA)	$1,801	6-cell 63-Whr battery	
Fujitsu	LifeBook T731	12.1" WXGA	Intel Core i5-2410M Processor	4GB	320 GB (7,200 RPM / SATA)	$1,595	6-cell 63-Whr battery	
Fujitsu	LifeBook T580	10.1" WXGA	Intel Core i5-560UM Processor	2GB	160 GB (5,400 RPM / SATA)	$1,141	3-cell battery	Reviews: [1]
Fujitsu	LifeBook T580	10.1" WXGA	Intel Core i5-560UM Processor	2GB	160 GB (5,400 RPM / SATA)	$1,029	6-cell battery	
Lenovo	ThinkPad X230T	12.5"	Intel Core i3-2370M Processor (3M Cache, 2.40 GHz)	4GB DDR3 - 1600 MHz (1 DIMM)	500GB Hard Disk Drive, 7200rpm	$1,189	3 Cell Battery X67	Reviews: [1][2][3][4] [5][6][7]
Lenovo	ThinkPad X230T	12.5"	Intel Core i5-3320M Processor (3M Cache, up to 3.30 GHz)	4GB DDR3 - 1600 MHz (1 DIMM)	500GB Hard Disk Drive, 7200rpm	$1,289	3 Cell Battery X67	
Lenovo	Ideapad Yoga 2 13	13.3"	Intel Core i3, i5, i7 processor	4/8GB DDR3 - 1600 MHz (1 DIMM)	500GB SSHD or 128/256GB SSD	$999	4 Cell Battery	
