= GETT'S =

Romanian beauty salon brand

- Industry: Beauty Industry
- Founded: Bucharest, Romania (1997)
- Founder: Lucian Miess
- Headquarters: Romania
- Area served: Romania
- Services: Hair cuts Beauty products
- Number of employees: approx. 250
- Website: getts.ro

GETT'S is a Romanian beauty salon brand operated by Ingo Trade.

== History ==
GETT'S was founded by Lucian Miess, in 1997, in Bucharest, Romania. In 1996, Lucian Miess participated at the world hairdressing championship in Washington, where he realized the difference between the huge industry in the United States and a cooperative in Romania. Believing in the potential of this industry, 6 months after the hairdressing championship, Miess came up with the brand's name "GETT'S". Miess wanted the name of the brand to be strong, short, one that would create a question mark about the correct pronunciation (in Romanian or English language) and was inspired by the font of the movie poster, Face/Off, to create the "GETT'S" logo. The brand was born with its first beauty salon in 1997 in Bucharest, GETT'S Hair Studio, with an investment of $25.000.

Revenues for 2017 were more than 2 million euros.

Revenues for 2018: approximately 2.5 million euros.

Number of clients for 2018: approximately 130.00.

Number of employees: approximately 250.

== Portofolio ==
In 2019, GETT'S has a portfolio of four brands: GETT'S Hair Studio, GETT'S Color Bar, GETT'S Men, GETT'S Men Exclusive. Over the years, 14 locations have been opened under the umbrella of GETT'S brand, the first franchise in the field in Romania, out of which 4 locations were created from own funds, the others being developed through various forms of partnerships such as associations, franchise, collaborations, management. In December 2011, GETT'S decided to launch a lifestyle magazine, named GETT'S Highlights Magazine.

GETT'S developed in 2002 the first loyalty program, called GETT'S Beauty Miles.

The brand uses professional E.R.P software and a CRM software.

GETT'S supported the development of the Vocational Education project in a dual system, together with the Bucharest District 3 City Hall.

== Locations ==
GETT'S is headquartered in Bucharest, Romania, and has a chain of 10 salons, located in different areas of Bucharest, such as JW Marriott Grand Hotel, Hotel Radisson Blu, InCity Residences, Bucuresti Mall, AFI Palace Cotroceni, Mega Mall, Park Lake and one salon located in the shopping center Iulius Mall Cluj in Cluj-Napoca.

== Awards ==
The 2014 Wella Gala: 1st Place Trend Vision Award: Alexandru Covasneanu, Gett's Color Bar, Bucharest, 1st Place Trend Vision Award – Veterans: Oana Moldoveanu, Gett's Color Bar, Bucharest.

== Events ==
Miss Universe 2013

Concordia Charity Event

Brave Cut – Renasterea Foundation

Glamour Fashion Street Show

Fashion Garage Summer Edition

AVANPREMIERE 20 Gala Anniversary Edition: In Memoriam Răzvan Ciobanu
