= Azomureș =

Romanian fertilizer producer

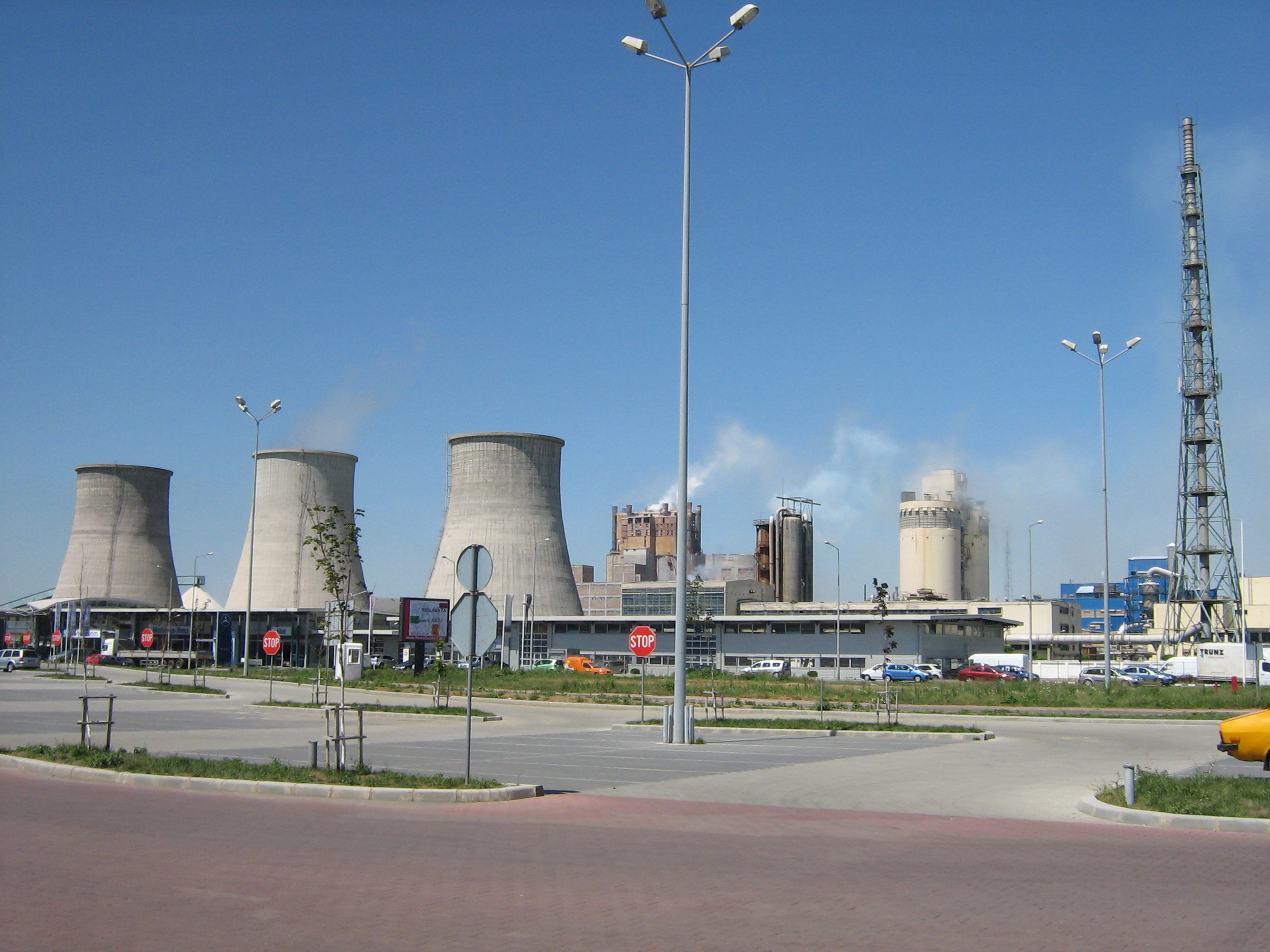
- Company type: Private
- Industry: fertilizers
- Founded: 1962
- Headquarters: Târgu Mureș, Romania
- Key people: Zacharias Joshua (CEO)
- Revenue: ▲$420 million USD
- Number of employees: 1,090 (2024)
- Website: Official website

Azomureș is the largest Romanian fertilizer producer. It is based in Târgu Mureș. The company was bought in 2002 by the largest fertilizer producer in Turkey, Transworld Fertilizers. In 2011, Azomureș was acquired by Swiss company Ameropa.

In 1981, the department of photosensitive materials within the Târgu-Mureș Nitrogenous Fertilizer Plant was put into operation, having Konishiroku Japanese license.

== Ethnic hiring controversies ==
Since its establishment, the ratio of Romanian workers to Hungarian workers in the plant has been significantly higher, estimated at 90% or even higher, if in addition to skilled workers are added technical and administrative staff. This phenomenon is explained by the fact that the authorities that followed a national-communist political line, in the context of industrialization, undertook the action of unifying the structure of the population on the territory of the country. Thus, Hungarian workers were not allowed to settle and work in Hungarian cities, and Romanians were brought in their place, especially from outside the Carpathian Mountains. At the Azomureș plant, at the time of opening, an entire class that graduated from a technical school in the Oltenia region was received, but when the leadership requested two chemists in 1968 and two Hungarians were assigned, they were rejected because of their ethnicity.

== See also ==
- Azomureș (photosensitive materials)
