= Polidin =

Vaccine

-Polidin is an immunomodulator vaccine invented in Romania at the Cantacuzino Institute and licensed in 1966, produced until 2012. It is a polybacterial preparation, being made up of a mixture of 13 Gram-positive and Gram-negative bacterial species (in the form of a suspension) that have been thermally inactivated. The preparation was intended for injectable administration, similarly to a vaccine.

-The research team that developed this formulation also included the head of production Sylvia Hoișie (b. 1928 - d. 24 May 2022)

-Immunostimulant efficacy and absence of teratogenic effects have been demonstrated by studies.

-It is desired to resume production, in 2018-'19 an action plan is underway to determine the necessary stages for the resumption of influenza vaccine production and the reauthorization of production to European standards for Polidin, which will be produced again at the Cantacuzino Institute in Iași in a new factory together with Cantastim
