= Flanco =

Retail companies of Romania

- Company type: Private
- Founded: 1994
- Headquarters: Bucharest, Romania
- Website: www.flanco.ro

Flanco is a Romanian consumer electronics retailer. The company has 120 stores in 74 cities, and has over 1,500 employees.

== History ==
=== 1994-1999 ===
The company was founded by Florin Andronescu (Flanco is an acronym of Florin Andronescu Company). The first store opened in 1994, making it the first Romanian electronics and home appliances retail chain.

In 1996, Oresa Ventures and the Danube Fund invested in the company. Later, Oresa purchased the majority shareholding for 1 million. By 1999, the company had 50 stores.

=== 2006-2021 ===
When Flanco was taken over by Flamingo in 2006, it was valued at 70 million euros.

By the end of 2009, the company was insolvent, and began restructuring. A 60% stake of the company was bought by the Asesoft group for 14 million euros in September 2010. The company has been under the sole ownership of Iulian Stanciu since 2012. Its CEO is Dragoş Sârbu. It recorded sales of over a billion lei in 2018. In 2021, the company opened its largest store in Ploiești.
