= Punk Radio Cast =

Internet radio station

Punk Radio Cast (PRC) was a streaming alt-rock and punk radio station that garnered over 20 million global listeners monthly. At its peak, PRC boasted a team of 18 DJs and six behind-the-scenes employees. It was believed to be the most popular free streaming punk radio station at the time.

== History ==
During 2000–2001, a lot of focus was placed on advancing the technology in their home based studio, they did not fall behind during their high school years. Punk rocker nerd Danny even managed to graduate a year early. Internet streaming was still developing and it became a constant struggle for Punk Radio Cast to live up to the broadcasting standards they set for themselves. This was a time period of trial and error along with a lot of rigorous study in addition to schoolwork

Punk Radio Cast and Interpunk, the leading online music distributor, joined forces in 2004 to create an interactive voting show, The Interpunk Top 40, to support a striving fraction of the music industry. With the current state of the music media industry, it is almost impossible for independent and new artists to gain exposure. Interpunk has created an innovative way, through their site, to offer artist’s distribution whether or not they receive label support. Punk Radio Cast developed their website to not only allow the listeners to vote upon the Top 40 winner but to offer the listeners a link to the artist’s album on Interpunk. Each week artists are randomly selected by Punk Radio Cast staff members and listeners. It is not mandatory for selected artist to be available on Interpunk; instead it is used to promote two tools that any artist can access, Interpunk and Punk Radio Cast.

Continuing to feed his drive to expand, Danny Keyes spent the latter part of 2004 and 2005 upgrading his studio to have the ability to air live plugged and unplugged performances from his favorite punk rock bands. Equipment was put to the test when the Sloppy Meat Eaters aired a full live set in early 2005. With the successful turnout live performances and in-studio guests became a regular event. Some memorable punk guests and performances include A Wilhelm Scream, Over It, Mustard Plug, The Queers, Clit 45, The Dictators, Manic Panic creators Tish and Snooky, The Independents, Lower Class Brats, Kill Radio, Dr. Hourai, Break the Silence, Michael Graves and Riverboat Gamblers.

In 2008, Punk Radio Cast introduced adPanel, a new proprietary technology which improved and simplified the process of measuring how many webcast listeners had been exposed to an advertisement on the service.

== PRC Compilation CD ==
Getting a head start on 2006, Punk Radio Cast produced and released their first ever compilation CD, Punk Rock Mix Tape 2006. The uniquely devised compilation features 23 punk tracks, selected by the Punk Radio Cast listeners. Punk rock artists on this album included The Descendents, The Aquabats, MXPX, A Wilhelm Scream, Strung Out, Against Me!, The Suicide Machines, Blood for Blood, Big D and the Kids Table, Over It and many others.

== Warped Tour and PRC ==
To kick off the 2008 Warped Tour, Punk Radio Cast hosted an exclusive VIP only party in downtown Toronto, which was also broadcast live to over 100,000 worldwide listeners. The event featured live performances by Creepshow, The Saint Alvia Cartel and Keepin' 6. The broadcast performances also included performances from Say Anything and Set Your Goals. The Toronto show also hosted the first ever Jones Soda Martini bar.

== Gibson Showroom and PRC ==
On October 9, 2008, Punk Radio Cast hosted an anniversary show at the Gibson Showroom in downtown Toronto. Entertainment included a performance by Keepin' 6, DJ Barry Taylor from Edge 102.1, a karaoke performance sung by Die Mannequin and a live broadcast of Josey Vogels and Fat Mike of NOFX's Sex Talk.

== Jones Soda and PRC ==
In June 2009, Internet radio station PunkRadioCast teamed up with Jones Soda to create a punk pop 6 pack featuring labels designed by PunkRadioCast and five great punk artists – New Found Glory, Less Than Jake, Bad Brains, Thursday and The Gaslight Anthem.

The 6 pack includes:

- Less Than Jake – Root Beer
- The Gaslight Anthem – Cream Soda
- New Found Glory – Fufu Berry
- Bad Brains – Rootz Beer
- Thursday – Cream Soda
- PunkRadioCast – Strawberry Lime
