= Meze Audio =

Romanian headphone company

- Type: Private
- Industry: Audio electronics
- Founder: Antonio Meze
- Headquarters: Baia Mare, Romania
- Website: www.mezeaudio.com

Meze Audio (also referred to as Meze or Meze Headphones) is a high-end audio company based in Baia Mare, Romania. Its product range consists of audiophile headphones and earphones.

Meze Headphones was founded by industrial designer Antonio Meze in 2011, in Baia Mare, Romania. Meze Headphones later changed its name to Meze Audio.

== History ==
The idea of developing headphones started in 2009, in a time when the founder, Antonio Meze, was traveling extensively while working as an industrial designer for different agencies or manufacturing companies. Passionate about music and design, he was looking for a pair of headphones to accompany his travels, that he could relate to in the same way he did to his Fender Stratocaster guitar.

That's what drove Antonio to start experimenting with parts already on the market and acquiring knowledge about headphones, using wood to craft the speaker enclosure cups, a departure from the standard plastics and polymers commonly used until then.

In 2011, Antonio created Meze Headphones (later renamed as Meze Audio), in his hometown of Baia Mare, a city in the North West part of Romania.

The breakthrough came in 2015, when the Meze 99 Classics were launched following an Indiegogo campaign. These have been the first headphones Meze Audio has developed in house, from the ground up, receiving multiple awards and nominations. The success of the 99 Classics was what helped Meze Audio initially build a name for themselves on the audiophile market. The next years came with new product releases for Meze Audio. In 2016 they launched their first earphones: 12 Classics and 11 Neo, and in 2017 they released the Meze 99 Neo headphones, to complete the Classics product range. Later on, in 2021, the 12 Classics V2, an upgraded version of the 12 Classics, featuring a new design, was launched.

The moment that has put Meze Audio on the map in the audiophile market came a year later, when the company decided to take a chance on developing a headphone which appeals to a higher, more exigent category of audiophiles. In 2018 Meze Audio has partnered up with Rinaro Isodynamics, a company from Ukraine, which has been at the forefront of planar magnetic development since the 1980s. Combining Meze's aesthetic and user-centered design approach and Rinaro's experience in research and development within the field of planar magnetic drivers, the Empyrean headphones were born and established Meze Audio's position on the high-end audio market.

Soon after the Empyrean, Meze Audio created their first flagship In-ear monitor, Rai Penta, with 2 x dual BA's and 1 Dynamic driver. To complete the RAI product range, Rai Solo came out end of 2019, as an IEM option for entry-level audiophiles.

Together with Rinaro, the company has created two more products using variations of the same highly acclaimed Isodynamic Hybrid Array technology used in Empyrean - ELITE, a headphone featuring the same design as Empyrean, which uses different materials for the driver to create a distinct sound, and LIRIC, the first closed-back headphone powered by the Isodynamic Hybrid Array driver from Rinaro, reengineered for portable use. Both products were launched in 2021.

Also in 2021, Meze Audio introduced their Art Gallery collection with the launch of Empyrean Phoenix, a rare collector's item that celebrates the union of art and high-end audio technology.

Meze Audio headphones are currently being sold worldwide, online and through retail stores.

== Products ==
Product	Type	Year released	Availability
99 Classics (2nd Gen)	Closed Back Dynamic headphones	2025	Available
105 Silva	Open Back Dynamic headphones	2025	Available
105 Aer	Open Back Dynamic headphones	2024	Available
Alba	IEM	2024	Available
Empyrean II	Open Back Planar Magnetic Headphones	2023	Available
109 Pro (Performance)	Open Back Dynamic headphones	2022	Available
ADVAR	IEM	2022	Discontinued
Liric	Closed Back Planar Magnetic Headphones	2021	Available
Elite	Open Back Planar Magnetic Headphones	2021	Available
Empyrean Phoenix	Open Back Planar Magnetic Headphones	2021	Limited Edition - Discontinued
12 Classics V2	Earphones	2021	Discontinued
Rai Solo	IEM	2019	Discontinued 2022
Rai Penta	IEM	2018	Discontinued 2023
Empyrean	Open Back Planar Magnetic Headphones	2018	Discontinued
99 NEO	Closed Back Dynamic Headphones	2017	Available
12 Classics Iridium	Earphones	2016	Discontinued 2019
12 Classics Gun Metal	Earphones	2016	Discontinued 2019
11 NEO Iridium	Earphones	2016	Discontinued 2019
11 NEO Gun Metal	Earphones	2016	Discontinued 2019
99 Classics Walnut Silver	Closed Back Dynamic Headphones	2016	Available
99 Classics Walnut Gold	Closed Back Dynamic Headphones	2015	Available
99 Classics Maple Silver	Closed Back Headphones	2015	Discontinued 2016
11 Deco	Earphones	2013	Discontinued 2015
11 Classics	Earphones	2013	Discontinued 2015
66 Classics	Headphones	2012	Discontinued 2015
73 Classics	Headphones	2011	Discontinued 2015
88 Classics	Headphones	2011	Discontinued 2014
55 Classics	Headphones	2010	Discontinued 2013
