= List of Jones Soda flavors =

Jones Soda is an American beverage maker known for premium carbonated soft drinks with unusual flavors and labels. The company is based in Seattle, Washington. Currently, 64 flavors are being sold. Consumers are drawn to both the flavor offerings as well as the brand's quirky image.

== Jones Soda Co: the original six flavors ==
- Orange
- Cherry
- Lemon-Lime
- Strawberry-Lime
- Grape
- Raspberry

== Seasonal and limited-edition flavors ==
- Thanksgiving

=== 2003 ===
Turkey & Gravy

=== 2004 ===
- Turkey & Gravy
- Cranberry
- Mashed Potatoes & Butter
- Green Bean Casserole
- Fruit Cake

=== 2005 (National Pack) ===
- Turkey & Gravy
- Brussels Sprout with Prosciutto
- Cranberry
- Wild Herb Stuffing
- Pumpkin Pie

=== 2005 (Regional Pack) ===
- Turkey & Gravy
- Broccoli Casserole
- Salmon Pâté
- Corn on the Cob
- Pecan Pie

=== 2006 ===
- Turkey & Gravy
- Sweet Potato
- Dinner Roll
- Pea
- Antacid

=== 2006 (Dessert Pack) ===
- Cherry Pie
- Banana Cream Pie
- Key Lime Pie
- Apple Pie
- Blueberry Pie
- Christmas
- Sugar Plum
- Candy Cane
- Egg Nog
- Valentine's Day
- Love Potion #6 (as opposed to "Love Potion No. 9")
- Halloween

=== 8 oz. Cans ===
- Candy Corn
- Strawberry S'lime
- Scary Berry Lemonade
- Caramel Apple
- Spider Cider
- Berried Alive
- Gruesome Grape
- Sour Lemon Drop Dead
- Spooookiwi
- Buried Pomegranate

=== Halloween ===
==== 2006 Halloween 12 oz. Bottle Flavors ====
- Lemon Drop Dead
- Creepy Cranberry
- Monster Mojito

==== 2007 Halloween 12 oz. bottle Flavors ====
Black Cat Licorice

- Dread Licorice (a pun on red licorice)
- Monster Mojito

==== 2013 Halloween 8 oz. Cans ====
- Return of Candy Corn
- Terror of Blood Orange
- Dawn of Caramel Apple
- Night of Red licorice

=== Seahawks Collector Pack ===
- Perspiration
- Natural Field Turf
- Dirt
- Sweet Victory
- Sports Cream

=== 2007 Holiday 12 oz. bottle flavors ===
- Gingerbread Man
- Christmas Cocoa
- Candy Cane ('repeat' from 2006)
- Egg Nog (part of 'Christmas Pack', 'repeat' from 2006)
- Sugar Plum (part of 'Christmas Pack', 'repeat' from 2006)
- Christmas Ham (part of 'Christmas Pack')
- "Christmas Tree" (part of 'Christmas Pack')
- Chocolate Coins (part of 'Chanukah Pack')
- Applesauce (part of 'Chanukah Pack')
- Jelly Doughnut (part of 'Chanukah Pack')
- Latke (part of 'Chanukah Pack')
- 2008 Holiday 12 oz. bottle flavors
- Spiced Pear
- Candy Cane ('repeat' from past two years)
- Mele Kalikimaka (Hawaiian for "Merry Christmas"; a tropical flavor)

The 'Christmas Ham' flavor was first created internally, years ago, by the company as a favor for The David Letterman Show where it was originally called Big Ass Canned Ham Soda. Only a few of these bottles still exist and three separate labels featuring various parts of a live pig were made. When the idea was pitched to make the flavor available as a special-run flavor, the company vetoed it, stating it was "doubtful" anyone would want to purchase it.

== Rare and limited run sodas ==
- Jingle Lime Soda
- Jingle Berry Soda
- Jingle Blue Bubble Gum Soda
- Jingle Cream Soda
- Big Ass Canned Ham Soda
- Nyan Cat Soda
- Road Kill Soda
- Billy Pop
- Pure Cane Ginger Ale
- Club Soda
- Red Line Root Beer
- Strawberry and banana mania
- Minecraft soda flavors
- Poutine Soda
- Fox Fuel Green Apple (shipped with Star Fox Adventures preorders)
- Fallout Nuka-Cola, including cherry, victory and quantum variants (2009-10, 2014-16 and 2020-present) (Sources needed, and outdated, as in the meantime, Nuka-Cola Victory was released in 2024 to promote the show on Amazon Prime Video, and as of September 2025, they've also released Nuka-Cola Quantum with a new, more sour flavor, and Nuka Grape Cola and a new flavor based on sunset sarsaparilla
- Birthday cake flavor, 2016 limited run, limited market to commemorate 20th anniversary of company's founding, and again in 2026 for 30th.

== Unusual flavors ==
- Chocolate
- Peachy Keen
- FuFu Berry
- Happy
- Pineapple Upside Down
- Invisible (no flavor listed, just a photograph)
- Fun
- Pink
- Bug Juice (Discontinued)
- Candy Corn
- Bacon (2010)
- Peanut Butter and Jelly

== Natural Jones Soda ==
- Lemon Ginger
- Passion
- Root Beer
- Peach Ginseng

== Ordinary flavors ==
- Root Beer
- Fruit Punch
- Cream Soda
- Vanilla Cola
- Orange & Cream
- Mf Grape
- Blue Bubblegum
- Kiwi
- Berry Lemonade
- Tangerine
- Watermelon
- Blueberry
- Blueberry Pomegranate
- Crushed Melon
- Green Apple
- Lemon Drop
- Cherry
- Strawberries and Cream
- Pure Cane Cola
- Twisted Lime
- Pure Cane Lemon Lime

== Sugar Free Jones Soda ==
- Sugar Free Black Cherry
- Sugar Free Root Beer
- Sugar Free Chocolate Fudge
- Sugar Free Berries and Cream
- Sugar Free Cream Soda
- Sugar Free Ginger Ale
- Sugar Free Pink Grapefruit
- Sugar Free Green Apple
- Sugar Free Cola
- Slim Root Beer
- Slim Lime Cola
- Slim Fu Fu Berry
- Slim Cream Soda
- Slim Orange Soda

== Jones Zilch Zero Calorie ==
- Black Cherry
- Cola
- Cream Soda
- Pomegranate
- Vanilla Bean

== Jones energy drinks ==
- 8 oz. Original Jones Energy
- 1 oz. Whoopass Energy Shot
- 8 oz. Whoopass Energy
- 8 oz. Jones Energy Lime
- 8 oz. Jones Energy Mixed Berry
- 8 oz. Jones Energy Orange
- 16 oz. Big Ol' Can of Whoopass
- 16 oz. Jones Energy
- 16 oz. Jones Sugar Free Energy

== Jones organics flavors ==
- Strawberry White Tea
- Cherry White Tea
- Berry Green Tea
- Mandarin Green Tea
- Tropical Red Tea
- Peach Red Tea

== Natural flavors ==
- Bohemian Raspberry
- Berry White
- Bada Bing!
- D'Peach Mode
- Limes With Orange
- Bananaberry
- Strawberry Manilow
- Fu Cran Fu
- Betty
- Dave
- Açai
- Your Momegranate

== Jones juice flavors ==
- Dave
- Betty
- Fu Cran Fu
- Berry White (in honor of The Golden Girls' Betty White)
- Black
- Purple Carrot
- Bada Bing

== 24C Enhanced Water ==
- Berry Pomegranate
- Cranberry Apple
- Tropical Citrus
- Peach Mango
- Mandarin Orange
- Blueberry Grape
- Kiwi Dragonfruit
- Red Grapefruit
- Strawberry Lemonade
