= Poiana (chocolate) =

Romanian chocolate brand

Poiana is a Romanian chocolate brand. The brand originates from a chocolate company that was based in Brașov.

In 1994 this company then known as "Poiana – Produse Zaharoase S.A" was bought by Kraft Foods, now Mondelez International. In 2009 Kraft Foods closed production in Brașov and consolidated production in another unit outside Romania, with the loss of 440 jobs.
