= Autonet Group =

- Company type: Private company
- Industry: Auto
- Founded: 1996
- Headquarters: Satu Mare, Romania
- Products: Auto parts
- Revenue: €1.3 Billion (2023)
- Number of employees: 1600 (2024)
- Website: http://www.autonet.ro

Autonet Group, established in 1996 in Satu Mare, is one of the largest auto parts distributor in Hungary and Romania.

It has an annual delivery of seven million spare parts to 9,000 customers in 13 countries, through their 31 companies.

In 2015, Swiss Automotive Group (SAG) acquired 51% of the company's shares.
