= Sam Mills (company) =

Romanian food company

- Type: Private company
- Industry: food
- Founded: 1994
- Headquarters: Satu Mare, Romania
- Key people: Mihai Gavris (CEO)
- Products: pasta, corn and wheat flours, semolina
- Revenue: € 25 million (2020)
- Number of employees: 230 (2020)
- Website: www.sammills.com

Sam Mills is a major Romanian and European food company founded in 1994 in Botiz, Satu Mare, Romania, which specialises in the processing of cereal grains, especially corn and wheat, producing bakery products, vegetable oil, pastas and water. The company is structured into three branches including Sam Mills (the mill), Arpis (pasta and vegetable oil distribution) and Sam Trade (with five subsidiaries). It controls Sam Mills (flour, pasta and vegetable oil producer), Arpis (distribution), Sam Trade (export company), Sam Gida (Turkey and CIS), Sam Trade UK (UK), Sam Trade DE (Germany) and Sam Mills LLC (United States).

Sam Mills produces several kinds of pasta under the Arpis and Pasta d'Oro brands and is one of Romania's leading pasta makers, with 40 per cent of the Romanian market in corn pastas. Sam Mills produces around 2,400 tonnes of dried pasta monthly in around 30 shapes and sizes. It is also a leading cornmeal flour, pasta sauce and corn oil producer, distributor and seller in Romania. Starting 2016 Sam Mills made its way to the water industry. Since then, the company is producing water under the AquaVia brand.

The most important branch of the group is Arpis one of the largest food distribution companies in Romania and the largest corn related company in the country with a market share of around 40 per cent. It was founded in 1994 and it is based in Cluj-Napoca, Cluj County. The exports and foreign trade branch called Sam Trade was founded in 2007 and it is based in Bucharest. The company opened its first international office in 2006 at Istanbul, Turkey, followed in 2008 by three other locations in Hatfield, Hertfordshire, United Kingdom, Rastatt, Germany and Boynton Beach, Florida, United States.

== See also ==
- Sam Mills official site
