= UNIO Satu Mare =

UNIO
- Company type: Private company
- Industry: steel
- Founded: 1911
- Headquarters: Satu Mare, Romania
- Products: steel products, machine building, metal processing
- Revenue: US$ 50 million (2008)
- Number of employees: 1,200 (2008)
- Website: www.unio.ro

UNIO, established in 1911, is a large company specialised in machine building, mechanical assembling works and hydraulic, pneumatic and electric equipment assembling commissioning and service for the mining, energy and assembling industries. It is one of the largest companies in Satu Mare.

In January 2005 UNIO signed a contract with the German industrial company KUKA for the manufacturing of several assembly lines for the giant carmaker Mercedes-Benz.

== See also ==
- Official site
