= Pegas (bicycle company) =

Romanian bicycle brand

- Industry: Cycle manufacture
- Founded: 1972
- Headquarters: Bucharest, Romania
- Key people: Andrei Botescu
- Products: Bicycles (including workbikes) and tricycles
- Number of employees: 50
- Website: bicicletapegas.ro

Pegas is the name of a bicycle produced in Romania since 1972 when the first adult model came on the market.

== History ==
Production started in 1972 in Mechanical Plant Tohan (Uzina Mecanică Tohan, originally an armaments factory), the first model for adults coming to market that year. In 1975 Pegas introduced a bicycle for children and a stationary bicycle for indoor exercise. In the 1980s series Pegas diversified to multi-speed bicycles, including the five-speed Pegas 1027 Campion. In the 1990s it introduced 18-speed mountain bikes and hybrids, as well as a stationary bicycle equipped with electronic readouts.

== Name and logo ==
The brand's logo, the winged horse Pegasus, is borrowed from Greek mythology as a "symbol of poetic inspiration" and of courage, swiftness, and adventurous spirit. One of the plant's slogans is taken from a letter written by French writer Gustave Flaubert: "Pegasus walks more often than he gallops; talent consists in making him take the desired pace."

== Workshop Pegas ==
In 2012, no-one owned the rights to the Pegas name, so Romanian Andrei Botescu quickly registered the trademark.

Raising 70,000 euros ($77,000; £55,000) from savings, family, friends, and bank loans, he quit his medical research job and set up his business Workshop Pegas. Mr Botescu had no prior experience of either making bicycles, or running a business, but after taking on a specialist bike designer, his company was up and running.

In 2013 the firm sold 500 bicycles, which then doubled in 2014, and reached 3,000 in 2015. To help build up sales, Mr Botescu was savvy with his promotional work, setting up a Facebook page, a YouTube channel and Instagram account.
