= Holba (disambiguation) =

Holba is a brewery situated in Czech Republic.

Holba may also refer to:

- Holba, a neighborhood in Hanušovice
- Holba, obsolete unit of measure which was being used in Austrian Empire and Austrian-Hungarian Empire
- Colin Holba (born 1994), American football player
