= List of Slovenian brands =

The following are brands and firms of Slovenia.

== Famous companies ==
- Gorenje: manufacturer of kitchen appliances
- Akrapovič: manufacturer of exhaust systems
- Elan: manufacturer of ski equipment, boats and other sport equipment. Also inventor of carving skis
- Krka: pharmaceutical company and exporter
- Pipistrel: aeroplane designer and manufacturer
- Radenska: sparkling water
- Barcaffe: coffee brand
- Tomos: motors

== Famous websites ==
- 24ur.com: news web page
- Najdi.si: search engine
- Siol.net: news web page
- Slovenskenovice.si: news web page
