= Treviso Marathon =

Annual running event in Italy

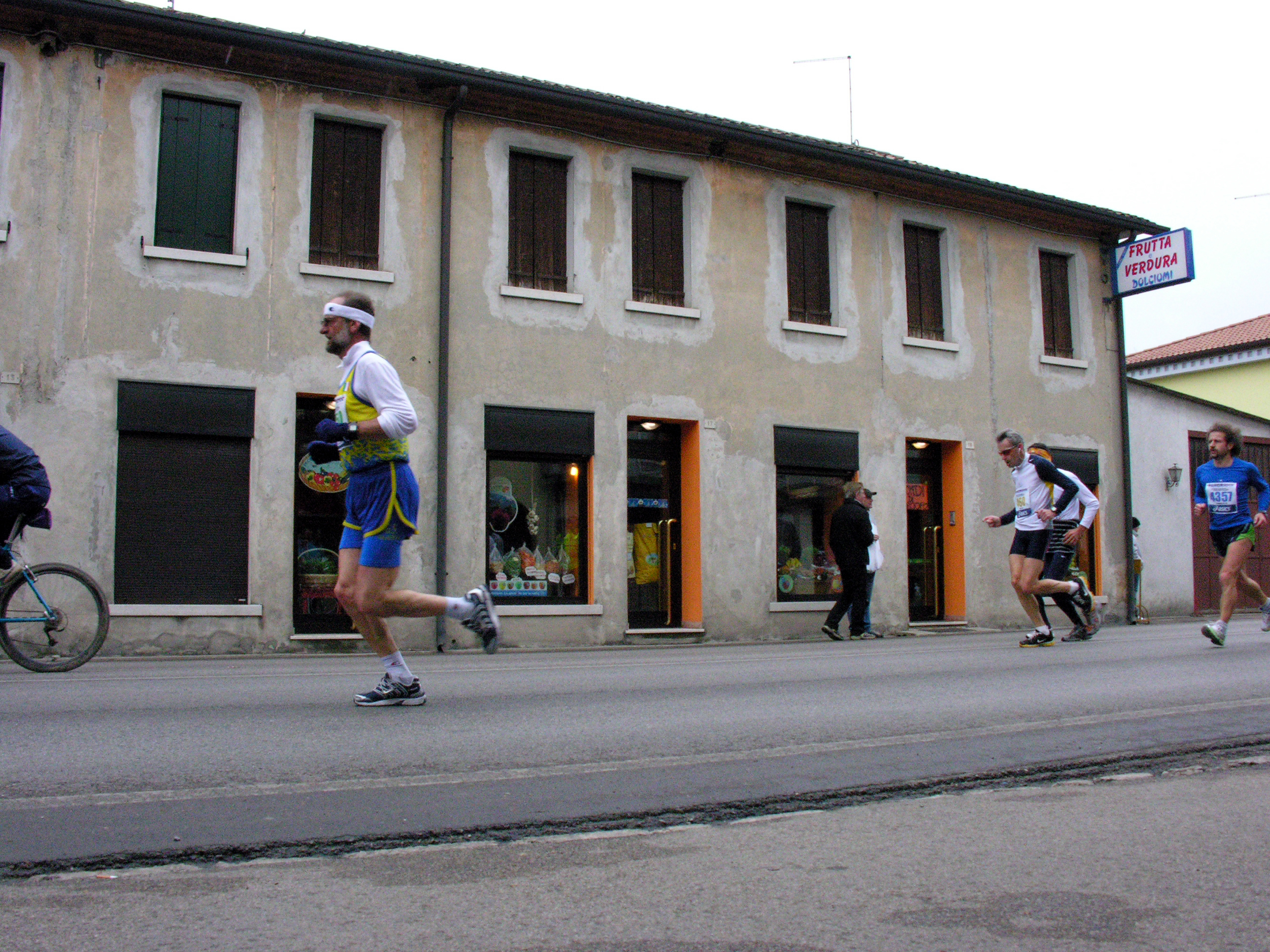
- Runners at the 2007 edition in Treviso
- Date: March
- Location: Treviso, Italy
- Event type: Road
- Distance: Marathon
- Established: 2004
- Course records: Men's: 2:10:18 (2007) (Kenya) Benjamin Pseret; Women's: 2:28:03 (2007) (Ethiopia) Shitaye Gemechu
- Website: Treviso Marathon
- Participants: 1,184 (2019)

The Treviso Marathon (Italian: Maratona di Treviso) is an annual road running event which is held in March in the area around the Province of Treviso in Italy.

== History ==
The Treviso Marathon was launched in 2004 and an initiative where any runner completing the distance under six hours received free entrance saw the race attract over 3000 runners, placing it as the fifth-largest marathon in Italy that year. The race continued to attract large numbers of runners after its inaugural edition and over 3700 people finished the 4th edition of the race in 2007. The event played host to the Italian championship race for the first time in 2009, with Italians Migidio Bourifa and Laura Giordano claiming both the race titles and national titles.

The course has a point-to-point format, beginning at Via Cavour near Viale della Vittoria in Vittorio Veneto and finishing within the city of Treviso at Porta San Tommaso in Piazza del Grano. Along its very flat, southerly route, it passes the towns of Conegliano, Susegana, Nervesa della Battaglia, Spresiano and Villorba. The course is certified by the Association of International Marathons and Distance Races.

The race attracts domestic elite level marathon runners, other European athletes and also Moroccan, Ethiopian and Kenyan runners. The course records were set in 2007, with Benjamin Pseret holding the men's best time of 2:10:18 and Shitaye Gemechu holding the women's record of 2:28:03 hours.

The 2020 edition of the race was postponed due to the COVID-19 pandemic, with the event likely being rescheduled for 2020.09.20.

== Past winners ==
Key: Course record Country's championship race

Edition	Year	Men's winner	Time (h:m:s)	Women's winner	Time (h:m:s)
1st	2004	Fabio Rinaldi (ITA)	2:11:48	Hafida Izem (MAR)	2:37:58
2nd	2005	Denis Curzi (ITA)	2:11:37	Alemu Zinash (ETH)	2:40:53
3rd	2006	Rachid Kisri (MAR)	2:10:34	Deborah Toniolo (ITA)	2:28:31
4th	2007	Benjamin Pseret (KEN)	2:10:18	Shitaye Gemechu (ETH)	2:28:03
5th	2008	Denis Curzi (ITA)	2:13:27	Helena Javornik (SLO)	2:28:36
6th	2009	Migidio Bourifa (ITA)	2:14:14	Laura Giordano (ITA)	2:35:36
7th	2010	Ottaviano Andriani (ITA)	2:12:49	Amelework Fekadu (ETH)	2:33:09
8th	2011	Naseef Ahmed (MAR)	2:13:57	Martina Celi (ITA)	2:36:14
9th	2012	Michael Chemchir (KEN)	2:15:06	Daniela Cârlan (ROM)	2:39:20
10th	2013	Said Boudalia (ITA)	2:20:38	Josephine Wangoi (KEN)	2:39:20
11th	2014	Simon Rugut (UGA)	2:16:32	Laura Giordano (ITA)	2:46:36
12th	2015	Stefano La Rosa (ITA)	2:12:02	Laura Giordano (ITA)	2:39:29
13th	2016	Yohannes Semereab (ERI)	2:17:32	Marija Vrajić (CRO)	2:40:41
14th	2017	Stefano La Rosa (ITA)	2:12:26	Lucy Liavoga (KEN)	2:52:12
15th	2018	Gilbert Chumba (KEN)	2:12:19	Medina Armino (ETH)	2:33:17
16th	2019	Gilbert Chumba (KEN)	2:13:10	Nancy Jelagat (KEN)	2:36:22
