= Daniela Cîrlan =

Romanian athlete (born 1980)

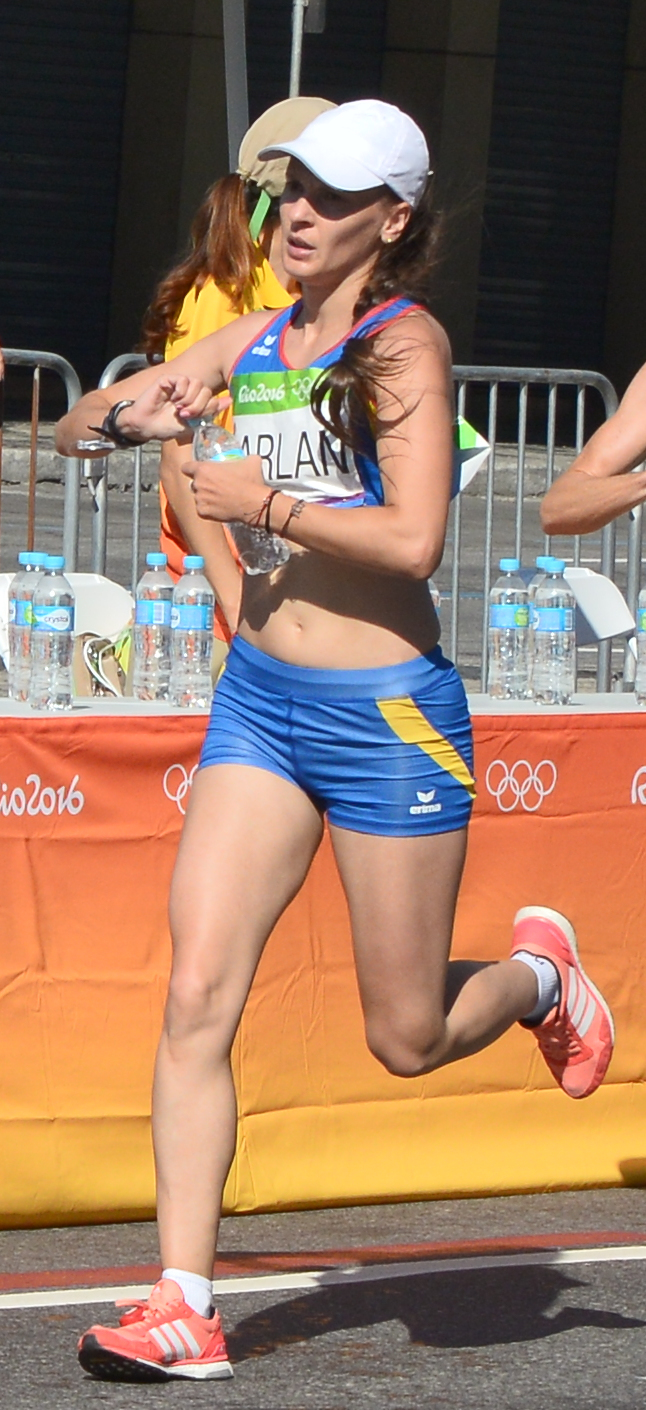
- Running at the Rio 2016 Olympic Games

Personal information
- Nationality: Romanian
- Born: 18 September 1980 (age 45) Sibiu, Romania
- Height: 1.62 m (5 ft 4 in)
- Weight: 45 kg (99 lb)

Sport
- Sport: Long-distance runner

Achievements and titles
- Olympic finals: 2004 Olympic Games
- World finals: 2003 World Championships

Elena Daniela Cîrlan (born 18 September 1980 in Sibiu), known as Daniela Cîrlan (sometimes spelled Cârlan), is a female long-distance runner and former race walker from Romania.

== Race walker ==
As a race walker her biggest successes were a fifth place in 5000 m walk at the 1998 World Junior Championships and a sixteenth place in 20 km at the 2004 World Race Walking Cup. She also competed at the 2003 World Championships and the 2004 Olympic Games.

=== Long-distance running ===
In 2006 Cârlan took up running. In October 2007 she ran the half marathon in 1:12:14 hours, finishing 28th at the 2007 IAAF World Road Running Championships. In marathon, she competed at the 2016 Olympic Games.

== Achievements ==
| Year | Competition | Venue | Position | Event | Notes |
Representing Romania
| 1998 | World Junior Championships | Annecy, France | 5th | 5000 m walk | 22:04.60 |
| 1999 | European Junior Championships | Riga, Latvia | 2nd | 5000 m walk | 21:46.15 |
| 2000 | European Race Walking Cup | Eisenhüttenstadt, Germany | 13th | 20 km walk | 1:31:30 |
| 2001 | European Race Walking Cup | Dudince, Slovakia | — | 20 km walk | DQ |
| 2001 | European U23 Championships | Amsterdam, Netherlands | 9th | 20 km walk | 1:34:41 |
| 2003 | World Championships | Paris, France | 23rd | 20 km walk | 1:36:02 |
| 2004 | Summer Olympics | Athens, Greece | 37th | 20 km walk | 1:37:14 |
| 2005 | European Race Walking Cup | Miskolc, Hungary | — | 20 km walk | DNF |
| 2007 | Vienna City Marathon | Vienna, Austria | 1st | Half marathon | 1:16:11 |
| 2008 | Berlin Marathon | Berlin, Germany | 9th | Marathon | 2:36:18 |
| 2009 | Hanover Marathon | Hanover, Germany | 3rd | Marathon | 2:45:22 |
| 2009 | Bucharest Marathon | Bucharest, Romania | 1st | Marathon | 2:44:49 |
| 2010 | Kavarna Marathon | Kavarna, Bulgaria | 1st | Marathon | 2:38:41 |
| 2010 | European Championships | Barcelona, Spain | — | Marathon | DNF |
| 2010 | Berlin Marathon | Berlin, Germany | 13th | Marathon | 2:42:34 |
| 2010 | Bucharest Marathon | Bucharest, Romania | 4th | Marathon | 2:50:01 |
| 2011 | Kavarna Marathon | Kavarna, Bulgaria | 4th | Marathon | 2:44:58 |
| 2011 | Bucharest Marathon | Bucharest, Romania | 5th | Marathon | 2:42:26 |
| 2012 | Naples Marathon | Naples, Italy | 2nd | Marathon | 2:44:14 |
| 2012 | Treviso Marathon | Treviso, Italy | 1st | Marathon | 2:39:20 |
| 2013 | Three Hearts Marathon | Radenci, Slovenia | 1st | Marathon | 2:41:55 |
| 2015 | Bratislava Marathon | Bratislava, Slovakia | 2nd | Marathon | 2:42:41 |
| 2015 | Krakow Marathon | Krakow, Poland | 3rd | Marathon | 2:43:38 |
| 2016 | Summer Olympics | Rio de Janeiro, Brazil | — | Marathon | DNF |
