= Workswell =

Czech company

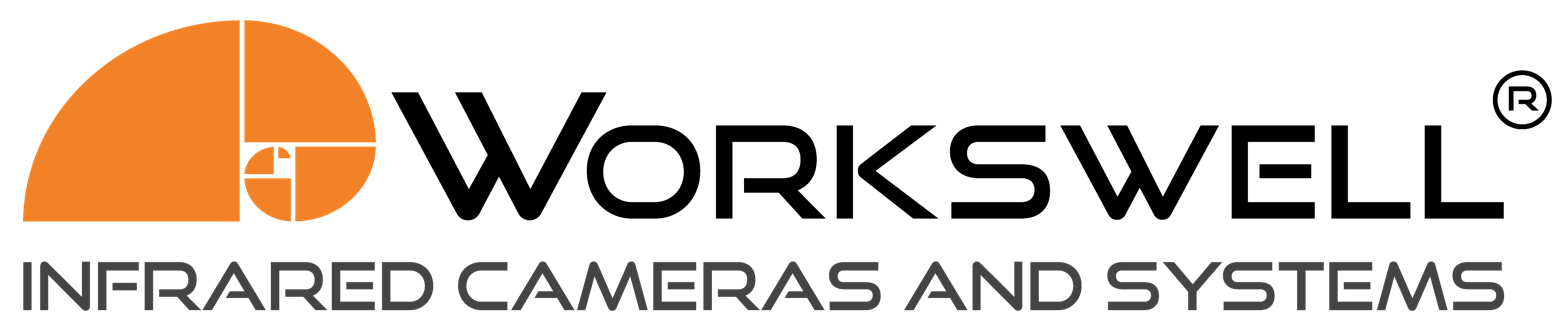
- Native name: Workswell s.r.o.
- Industry: monitoring, measuring
- Founded: 8. 3. 2010
- Headquarters: Na Okraji 335/42, 162 00, Praha 6-Veleslavín, Prague, Czech Republic
- Key people: Adam Svestka CEO, Jan Kovar CTO
- Website: www.workswell.eu

Workswell is a Czech company specializing in the development and production of thermal cameras and infrared imaging systems. The company was founded in 2010 and operates as a European manufacturer in this field.

Workswell was founded by Adam Švestka (CEO) and Jan Kovář (CTO), who continue to lead the company. The company focuses on developing thermal imaging technologies that are utilized in various industries, including industrial automation, agriculture, healthcare, security, and fire prevention.

Workswell develops specialized thermal cameras for drones, industrial applications, and gas emission measurement. Among the company's main products are the WIRIS Enterprise, SAFETIS EV, and WEOM thermal camera core.

The main focus of Workswell's current development and business strategy is its proprietary line of thermal imaging cores known as WEOM. These are compact and easily integrable thermal modules designed for manufacturers of security systems, drones, industrial cameras, and other devices that require thermal imaging as part of their functionality. WEOM cores are built for OEM integration and support standard communication protocols, including ONVIF, making them easy to deploy within standard IP-based infrastructures.

Workswell offers a range of WEOM variants tailored for different integration types and output interfaces. Available models include the WEOM thermal module, WEOM USB thermal module, WEOM HDMI thermal module, WEOM CVBS thermal module with analog output, and the WEOM GigE thermal module designed for industrial applications. For IP-based systems, the WEOM ONVIF thermal module is available, while zoom capabilities are offered through the WEOM zoom block thermal module.

WEOM cores utilize uncooled microbolometer technology (LWIR) and support real-time streaming of both radiometric and non-radiometric thermal data. Current development is focused on expanding functionality with advanced analytics, more compact designs, and broader compatibility with third-party systems.

Workswell's products are used in a wide range of applications. In industrial automation, thermal cameras are used to monitor and control production processes, while in agriculture, they help monitor the health of crops and soil. In healthcare, thermal imaging systems are used for fever screening, which is important for detecting febrile illnesses. In fire prevention, thermal imaging cameras play a role in the early detection of fires. In security, Workswell's systems are used for detecting people and objects in challenging conditions.

The company continues to focus on the development of new technologies and solutions in the field of thermal imaging. Their motto is "Innovation in Every Frame."

The company's customers include ČEZ, RWE, Bosch, Honeywell, Tesco, Heineken, Kofola, IKEA, Net4Gas, Semikron, ArcelorMittal, Vítkovice power engineering etc., among others.

One of the founders, Jan Kovář, received a prestigious award at the first Young Blood Awards 2023 for his contributions to thermographic technology.

Additionally, in a survey by Hospodářské noviny, the company received three awards in 2018:

- Company of the Year in Prague, an award they also won in 2015
- Responsible Company of the Year
- Economically Most Successful Company

For more information about the company and its products, visit Workswell.eu
