= Three Hearts Marathon =

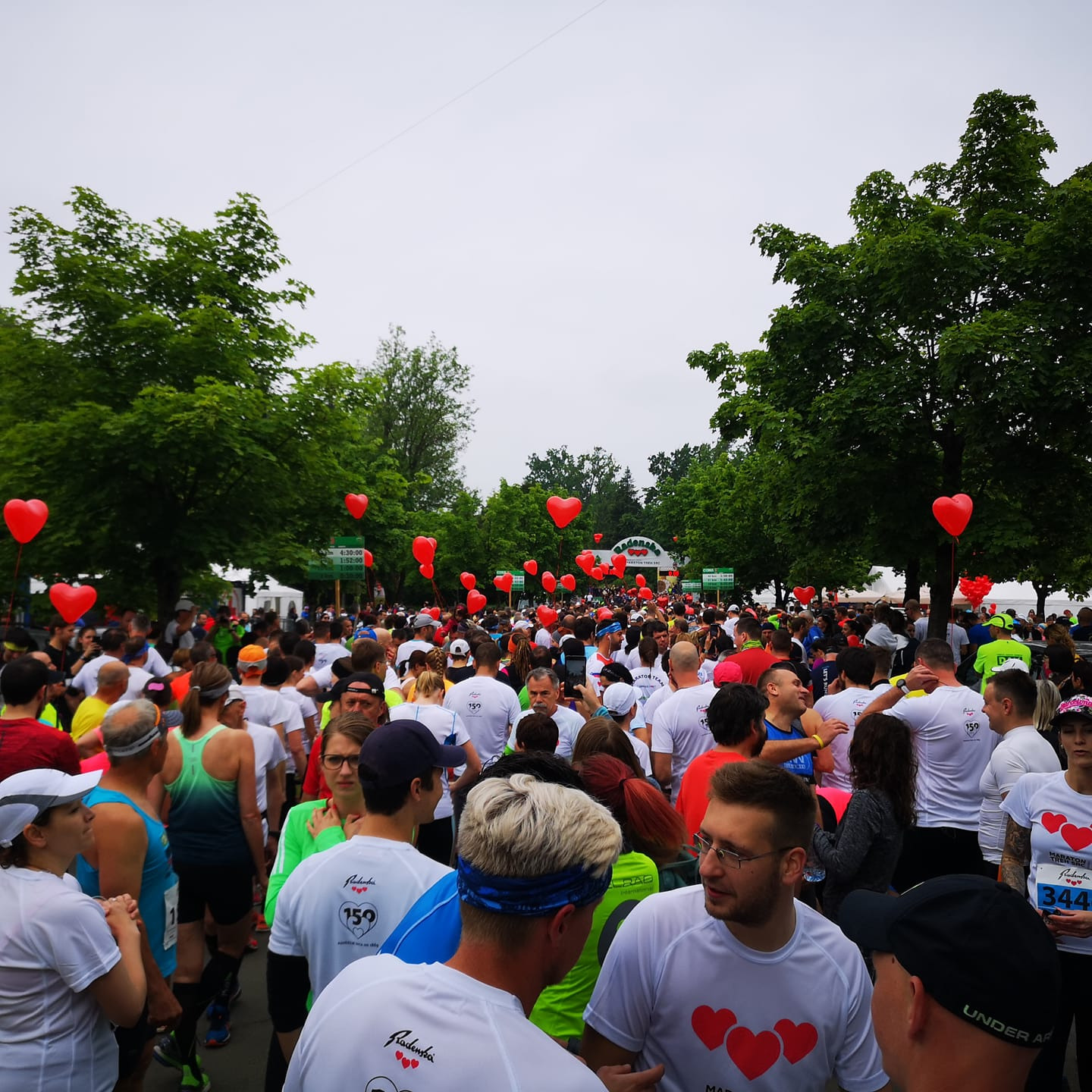
- 39th Three Hearts Marathon (2019)
- Date: May
- Location: Radenci, Slovenia
- Event type: Road
- Distance: Marathon, Half marathon, 10K run, 5K run
- Primary sponsor: Radenska
- Established: 1981
- Course records: Men's: 2:15:26 (2006) (Kenya) David Biwott; Women's: 2:38:10 (2024) (Kenya) Sheila Chebet
- Website: Three Hearts Marathon
- Participants: 181 (2019)

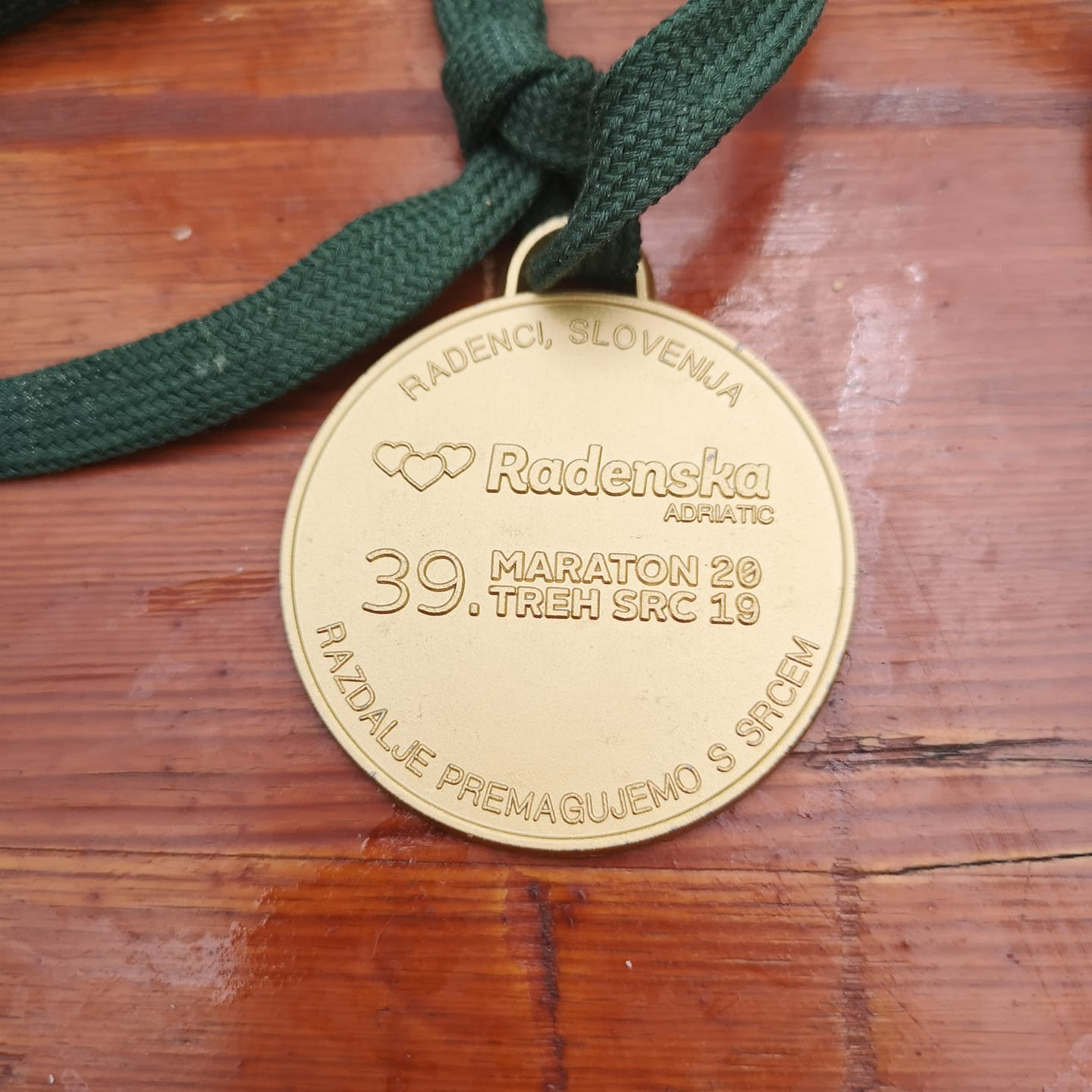
39th Three Hearts Marathon; memorial medal (2019)

Three Hearts Marathon (Slovene: Maraton treh src) is a marathon, organised in Radenci in Slovenia. It has been taking place since 1981 and attracts several thousand people each year. In addition to the marathon, a half marathon (21 km), recreative running (10 km) and a course for juniors and teenagers are organised.

The event was the Slovenian national championships race from 1992 to 1998 and has hosted the national race in even-numbered years since then, now sharing the honour with the Ljubljana Marathon.

The 2020 edition of the race was postponed to 2021.05.15 due to the coronavirus pandemic, with registrants having the option of obtaining a refund.

== Winners ==
Key: Course record

Year	Men's winner	Time (h:m:s)	Women's winner	Time (h:m:s)
2024	Sakong Ndiwa (KEN)	2:20:21	Sheila Chebet (KEN)	2:38:10
2023	Laban Cheruiyot (KEN)	2:20:39	Jasmina Ilijaš (CRO)	3:00:32
2022	Janez Mulej (SLO)	2:35:20	Andreja Gorčan (SLO)	3:35:01
2021	postponed to 2022 due to coronavirus pandemic			
2020	postponed to 2021 due to coronavirus pandemic			
2019	Moses Kipruto (KEN)	2:19:12	Hellen Kimutai (KEN)	2:50:14
2018	Daniel Chebolei (KEN)	2:19:02	Yunes Moraa (KEN)	2:44:22
2017	Joel Maina (KEN)	2:21:50	Gladys Biwott (KEN)	2:51:31
2016	Samson Kagia (KEN)	2:26:27	Hellen Kimutai (KEN)	2:47:59
2015	Silas Too (KEN)	2:16:20	Gladys Biwott (KEN)	2:40:14
2014	Elisha Sawe (KEN)	2:19:16	Tünde Szabó (HUN)	2:44:35
2013	Elisha Sawe (KEN)	2:25:46	Daniela Cârlan (ROM)	2:41:55
2012	Mitja Kosovelj (SLO)	2:22:09	Marija Vrajić (CRO)	2:57:33
2011	Edwin Kibowen (KEN)	2:33:35	Helena Javornik (SLO)	2:48:02
2010	Joshua Kurui (KEN)	2:19:38	Daneja Grandovec (SLO)	2:47:10
2009	Mitja Kosovelj (SLO)	2:23:10	Neža Mravlje (SLO)	3:04:35
2008	Silas Rutto (KEN)	2:24:45	Helena Javornik (SLO)	2:39:23
2007	Moses Kitum (KEN)	2:20:15	Ida Kovács (HUN)	2:50:14
2006	David Biwott (KEN)	2:15:26	Ida Kovacs (HUN)	2:45:50
2005	Jonathan Kipsaina (KEN)	2:20:47	Jožica Šiftar (SLO)	3:38:56
2004	Joachim Nshimirimana (BDI)	2:18:35	Margaret Chepkosgei (KEN)	2:42:29
2003	William Kiprotich (KEN)	2:17:45	Ida Šurbek (SLO)	2:48:27
2002	Roman Kejžar (SLO)	2:25:17	Ida Kovacs (HUN)	2:43:33
2001	Anatoliy Archakov (RUS)	2:22:57	Ida Kovacs (HUN)	3:09:47
2000	Mikhail Romanov (RUS)	2:16:20	Gigliola Borghini (ITA)	2:38:33
1999	Roman Kejžar (SLO)	2:18:58	Helena Javornik (SLO)	2:39:50
1998	Charles Subano (KEN)	2:20:38	Anica Živkovič (SLO)	2:47:57
1997	Charles Subano (KEN)	2:19:28	Silva Vivod (SLO)	2:54:37
1996	Mirko Vindiš (SLO)	2:29:47	Eniko Fehrer (HUN)	2:56:27
1995	Janos Szeman (HUN)	2:31:55	Helena Javornik (SLO)	2:51:33
1994	Mirko Vindiš (SLO)	2:21:08	Helena Javornik (SLO)	2:49:35
1993	Mirko Vindiš (SLO)	2:24:55	Helena Javornik (SLO)	2:52:40
1992	Srečo Končina (SLO)	2:29:15	Olga Grm (SLO)	3:09:47
1991	Josef Pulai (HUN)	2:35:34	Olga Grm (YUG)	3:09:50
1990	Marko Dovjak (YUG)	2:34:42	Olga Grm (YUG)	3:15:15
1989	Milan Jankovič (YUG)	2:44:10	Olga Grm (YUG)	3:24:10
1988	Milan Jankovič (YUG)	2:46:10	Olga Grm (YUG)	3:28:10
1987	Marjan Krempl (YUG)	2:38:22	Rezi Filipič (YUG)	3:39:17
1986	Dušan Mravlje (YUG)	2:34:31	Rezi Filipič (YUG)	3:28:16
1985	Pavel Močnik (YUG)	2:34:31	Rezi Filipič (YUG)	3:39:21
1984	Marko Dovjak (YUG)	2:36:34	Maja Kristl (YUG)	3:29:36
1983	Marko Dovjak (YUG)	2:50:42	Tatjana Jesenko (YUG)	3:37:10
1982	Janez Falež (YUG)	2:38:51	Modic Tina (YUG)	4:01:43
1981	Milan Kotnik (YUG)	2:48:29	Tatjana Goleš (YUG)	4:14:40

== Statistics ==
Note: Marathon statistics only

=== Winners by country ===
Country	Men's race	Women's race	Total
Slovenia	19	25	44
Kenya	13	7	20
Hungary	2	5	7
Croatia	0	2	2
Russia	2	0	2
Burundi	1	0	1
Italy	0	1	1
Romania	0	1	1
