= Bucharest Marathon =

Annual race in Romania held since 2008

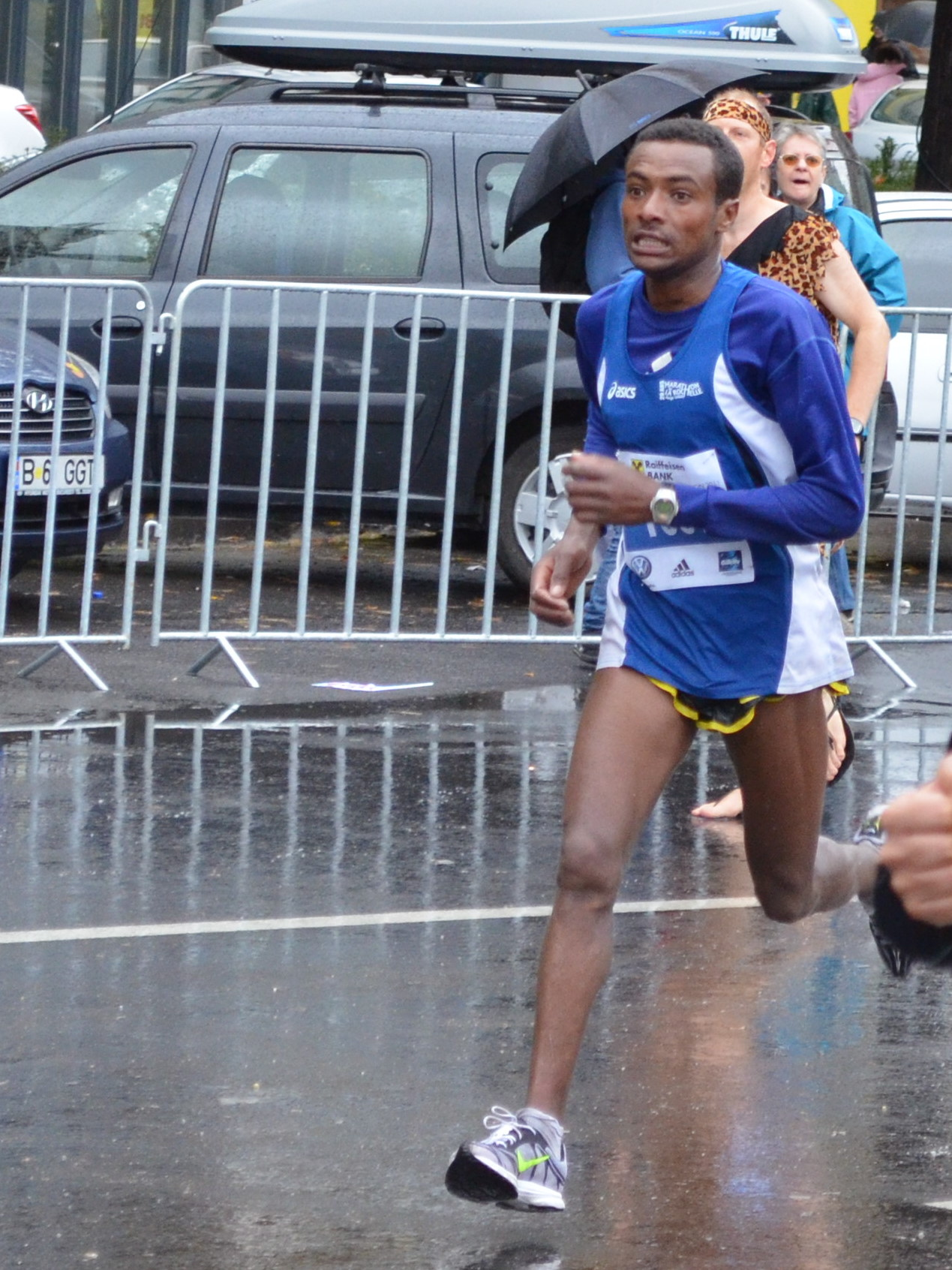
- Tekla Getu, winner of the 2011 marathon, running in the rain past a costumed person wearing sandals
- Date: October
- Location: Bucharest, Romania
- Event type: Road
- Distance: Marathon
- Primary sponsor: Raiffeisen Bank
- Established: 2008 (18 years ago)
- Course records: Men's: 2:10:51 (2019) (Kenya) Hosea Kipkemboi; Women's: 2:32:20 (2011) (Russia) Marina Kovaleva
- Website: Bucharest Marathon
- Participants: 426 finishers (2021); 914 (2019)

The Bucharest Marathon is an annual marathon and sport event hosted by the city of Bucharest, Romania since 2008. It is organized by the Bucharest Running Club, and held during the second weekend of October. The marathon is categorized as a Bronze Label Road Race by World Athletics.

== History ==
An annual marathon has been held in Bucharest as early as 1992.

The first edition of the most recent version of the annual marathon was first held in 2008.

In 2020, initially, the race was limited to 250 professional runners due to the coronavirus pandemic, with all other entries automatically transferred to 2021, and all such registrants given the option of also running the race virtually and receiving a medal for free. (Note: In addition, the marathon course was replaced with a loop of length 10.5 km (6.5 mi) for the professional runners that year, before the marathon was cancelled.) However, the day before the scheduled date, the marathon was cancelled due to a request from the Ministry of Youth and Sport sent to the organizers the night before, in reaction to rising numbers of coronavirus cases within the capital.

== Course ==
External image
- Course map of full marathon in 2019

The course begins on Bulevardul Libertății east of Izvor Park and heads briefly east on Bulevardul Unirii past Piața Unirii before returning to Parcul Izvor and then heading north to Arcul de Triumf via Strada Berzei. The course then turns around and heads back to Izvor Park via Calea Victoriei. The course then heads southwest past Piața Constituției to run a loop on Șoseaua Panduri and Bulevardul Tudor Vladimirescu. After returning to Piața Constituției, the course heads east again on Bulevardul Unirii, with a turnaround at the roundabout at Piața Alba Iulia and then a long loop on Splaiul Unirii, before returning to a finish at Piața Constituției.

== Other races ==
The event also includes a half marathon, a 10K, and a marathon relay. In addition, there are several races held the day before that are not electronically timed, including a 2.5 km (1.6 mi) race, a race for teens also of length 2.5 km (1.6 mi), and multiple races for kids.

== Winners ==
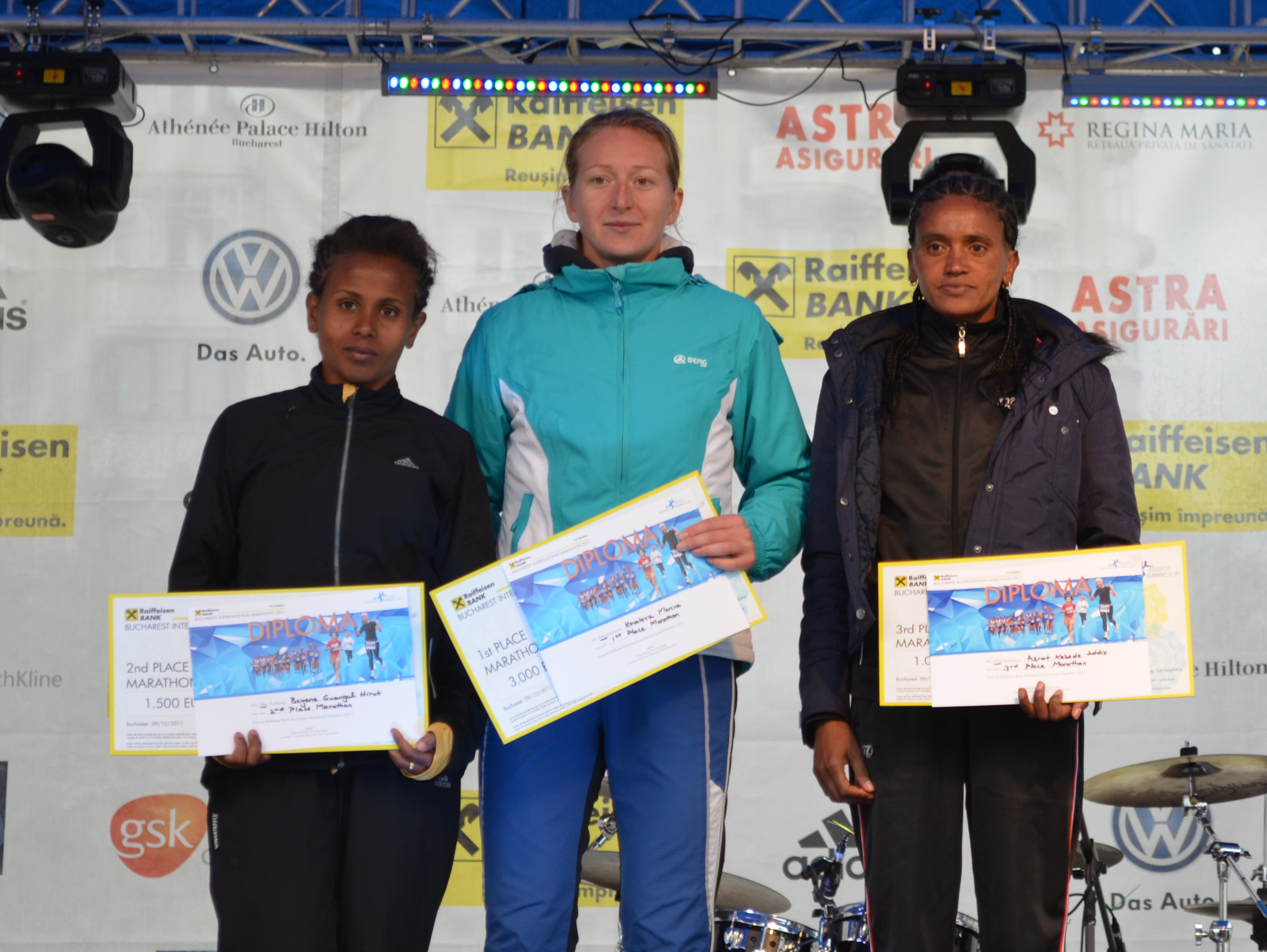
Winners of the 2011 marathon

Key: Course record

Ed.	Year	Men's winner	Country	Time	Women's winner	Country	Time	Rf.
1	2008	Francis Maundu	Kenya	2:15:48	Valentina Delion	Moldova	2:49:52	
2	2009	Eric Yator	Kenya	2:20:35	Daniela Cârlan	Romania	2:44:49	
3	2010	Duncan Koech	Kenya	2:13:59	Sviatlana Kouhan	Belarus	2:35:13	
4	2011	Tekla Getu	Ethiopia	2:17:21	Marina Kovaleva	Russia	2:32:20	
5	2012	Felix Kangogo	Kenya	2:15:19	Almaz Negede	Ethiopia	2:38:09	
6	2013	Victor Chelogoi	Kenya	2:14:05	Tigist Worku	Ethiopia	2:37:28	
7	2014	Michael Kipyego	Kenya	2:13:37	Paula Todoran	Romania	2:41:23	
8	2015	Patrick Kimeli	Kenya	2:13:16	Zeritu Wakjira	Ethiopia	2:48:53	
9	2016	James Barmasai	Kenya	2:15:05	Zeritu Wakjira	Ethiopia	2:40:33	
10	2017	Duncan Koech	Kenya	2:13:13	Almaz Gelana	Ethiopia	2:42:06	
11	2018	Hosea Kipkemboi	Kenya	2:11:31	Almaz Gelana	Ethiopia	2:41:29	
12	2019	Hosea Kipkemboi	Kenya	2:10:51	Sophia Chesire	Kenya	2:33:36	
–	2020	Cancelled due to COVID-19 in Romania						
13	2021	Ivan Siuris	Moldova	2:20:29	Adela Paulina Baltoi	Romania	2:47:25	
14	2022	Alexandru Corneschi	Romania	2:16:35	Adela Paulina Baltoi	Romania	2:48:08	
15	2023	Chaboud Mohamed	Morocco	2:17:19	Serkalem Mengiste Mekonnen	Ethiopia	2:37:44	
16	2024	Nicolae Soare	Romania	2:16:35	Sana Achahbar	Morocco	2:39:03	
17	2025	Nicolae Soare	Romania	2:11:58	Beatrice Cherono	Kenya	2:44:51	
