= Adanech Zekiros =

Ethiopian long-distance runner

Zekiros Adanech
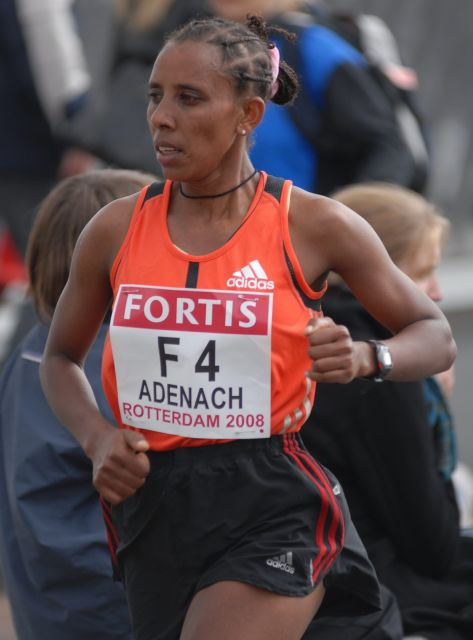

Personal information
- Nationality: Ethiopia
- Born: 26 March 1982 (age 44) Ethiopia

Sport
- Sport: Running
- Event: Marathon

Zekiros Adanech (Ethiopian: ዘኪሮስ አዳነች; born 26 March 1982) is an Ethiopian long-distance runner. For her career, her personal bests were: 31:59.37 in the 10,000 metres in Sollentuna on 28 June 2005, 1:12.06 in the half marathon in Addis Ababa on 28 August 2005, and 2:27.32 in the marathon in Rotterdam on 13 April 2008.

In the 2004 IAAF World Half Marathon Championships, Adanech finished 16th with a time of 1:13:50, at the time a personal best. After focusing on the 10,000 metres and half marathon early in her career, she moved to the full marathon in 2005. She ran in the Reims à Toutes Jambes and won in 2005 with a time of 2:35:55. In 2006, she followed that up with an eighth-place finish at the 2006 Berlin Marathon with a time of 2:36:48 and a third-place finish at the 2006 Rome Marathon with a time of 2:27:38. Adanech has won the Rock 'n' Roll Arizona Marathon twice; in 2007, she won with a time of 2:31:43, and the following year she won with a time of 2:31:14, breaking the course record in the process. Her last major race was the 2008 Rotterdam Marathon; she finished second with a personal-best time of 2:27.32.
