= Hafida Izem =

Moroccan long-distance runner

Hafida Izem (born 20 April 1979) is a Moroccan marathon runner. She represented her country at the 2004 Summer Olympics. Based in Italy, she mainly competes in road races in the country, having won marathons in Bari, Treviso and Naples.

== Biography ==
Her first international selection came at the 2001 Universiade, where she was 17th over 5000 metres. She won the Bari Marathon the following year. She opened her 2003 with a win at the Mare Monti half marathon and she improved her marathon best to 2:36.18 hours at the Rome City Marathon, coming fourth. She won the 2003 Prato Marathon in September.

She ran a half marathon best to claim the title at the Roma-Ostia Half Marathon in February, winning in a time of 1:10:39 hours. In March, Izem became the inaugural women's winner of the 2004 Treviso Marathon, and just one week later she ran at the 2004 IAAF World Cross Country Championships, taking 65th place. She set a course record at the Vivicittà Firenze Half Marathon the following month. A marathon best of 2:36:02 came at the Neapolis Marathon in Naples and she gained selection to represent Morocco the event at the 2004 Athens Olympics. She was 27th in the Olympic marathon race in Greece.

Izem had a period of illness in 2005 but returned in 2006 to set a career best time of 2:31:30 hours at the Frankfurt Marathon, taking third place on the podium. She was fifth at the Roma-Ostia race in 2007, but took the top honours at the Citti di Pistoia Half Marathon a month later. She also ran a best for the 20 km (1:09:36) that month, coming fifth at the 20 van Alphen. She won the half marathon race at the 2011 edition of the Casablanca Marathon, then won the Half Marathon de Laayoune at the end of the year.
