= Denis Curzi =

Italian long-distance runner

Personal information
- National team: Italy (caps 8)
- Born: 14 May 1975 (age 51) Dernbach, Germany
- Height: 1.72 m (5 ft 8 in)
- Weight: 54 kg (119 lb)

Sport
- Country: Italy
- Sport: Athletics
- Event: Long-distance running
- Club: Centro Sportivo Carabinieri

Achievements and titles
- Personal bests: Half marathon: 1:02:23 (2000); Marathon: 2:12:28 (2002)

Denis Curzi (born 14 May 1975) is an Italian male former long-distance runner who competed at individual senior level at four editions of the IAAF World Half Marathon Championships (2000, 2002, 2007, 2009).

He won Treviso Marathon in 2008.

== Career ==
In 1998, he won the Maratona del Lamone in his debut race over the 42.195 km distance. In 1999, he finished third in the South Tyrol Marathon and fourth in the Cesano Boscone Marathon. The following year, he finished eighth in the Garda Half Marathon and came in 53rd at the World Half Marathon Championships in Veracruz.

In 2001, he finished 13th in the Venice Marathon.

He achieved his second victory in Treviso in 2008.
