= Medina Armino =

Ethiopian long-distance runner

Personal information
- Full name: Medina Deme Armino

Sport
- Country: Ethiopia
- Sport: Athletics
- Event: Long-distance running

Medina Deme Armino is an Ethiopian long-distance runner. In 2019 and 2020 she won the Xiamen International Marathon held in Xiamen, China. In 2019, she won with a time of 2:27:25 and in 2020 she improved her time to 2:26:12.

In 2018, she won the Treviso Marathon held in Treviso, Italy with a time of 2:33:17. In that same year, she also won the Beirut Marathon held in Beirut, Lebanon with a time of 2:29:30.

== Achievements ==
Year	Competition	Venue	Position	Event	Notes
2018	Treviso Marathon	Treviso, Italy	1st	Marathon	2:33:17
2018	Beirut Marathon	Beirut, Lebanon	1st	Marathon	2:29:30
2019	Xiamen International Marathon	Xiamen, China	1st	Marathon	2:27:25
2020	Xiamen International Marathon	Xiamen, China	1st	Marathon	2:26:12
