= Zubr Brewery =

Czech beer brewery

Zubr
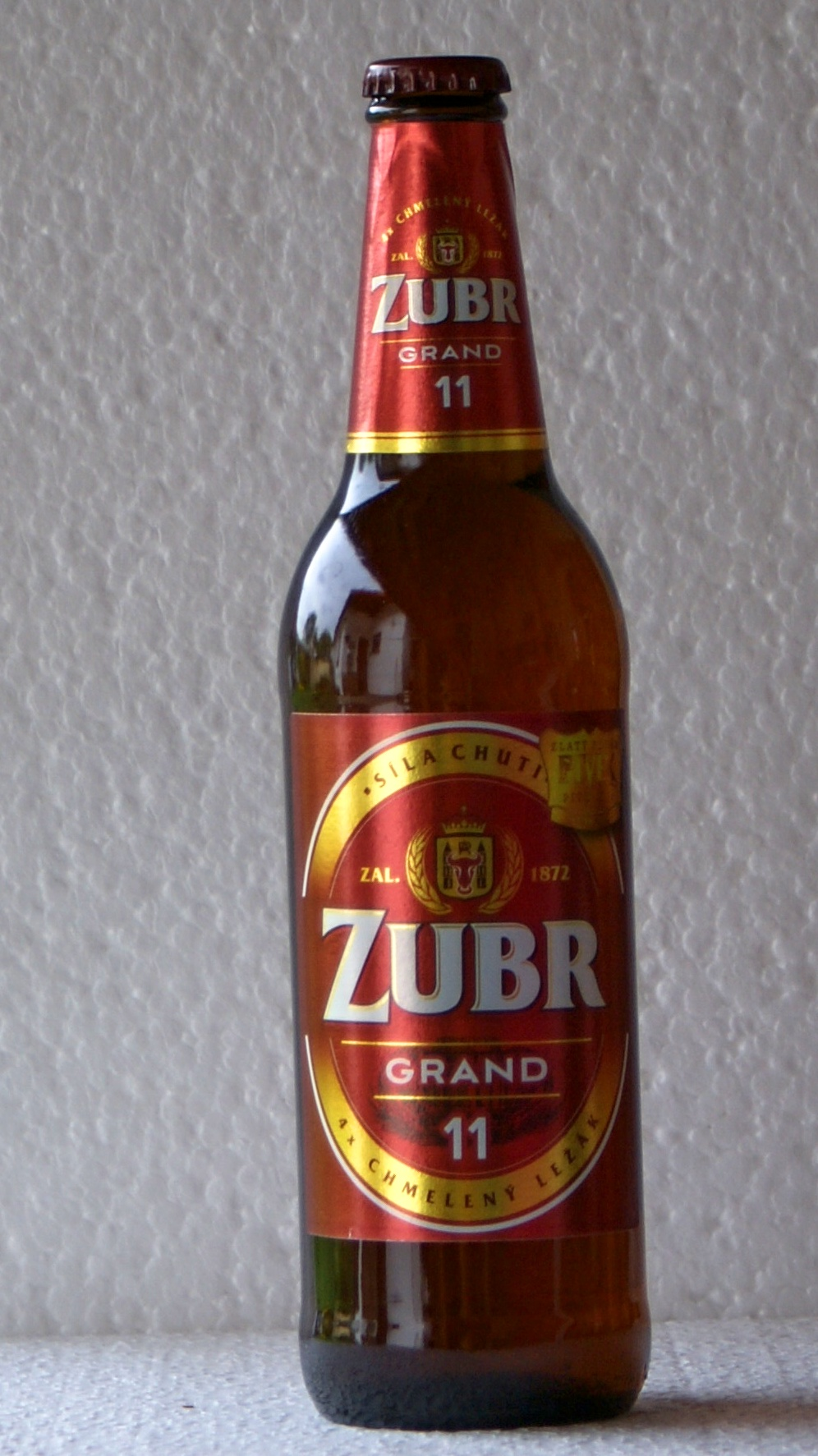
- Zubr Grand 11
- Type: Beer
- Origin: Czech Republic
- Introduced: 1872
- Website: zubr.cz

Zubr Brewery (Czech: Pivovar Zubr) or Přerov Brewery (Czech: Pivovar Přerov) is a beer brewery in the Czech Republic. Founded in 1872 in the town of Přerov, it has been owned by the Czech beverage company Kofola since 2023. The brewery sponsors the ice hockey team HC ZUBR Přerov.
