= Semtex (drink) =

Czech brand of energy drinks

- Type: Energy drink
- Manufacturer: Kofola
- Origin: Czech Republic
- Introduced: 1995
- Color: Amber, green
- Variants: Original, Forte, Light
- Website: www.semtex-energy.eu

Semtex is a brand of energy drink manufactured in the Czech Republic by Pinelli since 1995, and was the first such drink to be produced in the country. The drink gained notoriety after taking its name from Semtex, a well-known plastic explosive, which is also of Czechoslovak origin.

== History ==
Semtex was introduced in 1995 by the Pinelli company, which had been formed in 1993 in the town of Čáslav, and which also produced juices and fruit drinks. Over the following decade, Red Bull became the market leader in both the Czech Republic and neighbour Slovakia, with Semtex the second strongest seller, providing Pinelli with most of its sales. Semtex was also exported to Hungary, Austria, Germany and Russia. On 22 April 2011, Pinelli was taken over by the Kofola Group, the largest soft drinks producer in the Czech Republic.

In 2005, Russia's consumer protection agency refused to extend Semtex's production licence due to fears that it could be harmful to consumers' health. New regulations were introduced in Russia limiting stimulants in energy drinks to two for non-alcoholic drinks, and Semtex contains several such additives. Furthermore, it was claimed that Semtex products did not display adequate warnings about excessive consumption.

== Name controversy ==
The drink is named after Semtex – a popular plastic explosive also invented and produced in the Czech Republic by Explosia a.s., a subsidiary of Synthesia. According to Pinelli's director Květoslav Srovnal, the name inspired "a feeling of activity and motion". In late 1994, Pinelli applied for a trademark to gain exclusive use of the Semtex name for food and drinks, after which Synthesia applied for a universal trademark for the name with regard to all products – prior to this the company only owned the Semtex trademark for the explosives sector. Synthesia subsequently sued Pinelli for copyright infringement, and a company spokesman claimed that it was "unfair competition", and that an important reason for Pinelli's success was due to the use of the Semtex name. Pinelli had offered to donate a percentage of the drink's profits to a charity of Synthesia's choice, but Synthesia ultimately refused before filing the lawsuit. Srovnal dismissed the refusal of the offer as a "typical socialist management tactic".

In 2002, the two companies decided to settle financially and Pinelli were issued with a licence to use the Semtex name on their drinks products. After splitting from Synthesia, Explosia later threatened to sue Madonna for the use of the Semtex name in her film production company Semtex Girls, but later relented.

== Variants ==
Two basic versions of Semtex drink are available: original Semtex and the sugar-free Semtex Light with artificial sweeteners. Other variants including Semtex Junior, a children's version which lacked stimulants, Semtex Hot (with chilli and ginger) and Semtex Ice (with mint) are no longer available. Until 2012, a stronger version called Semtex Forte was available before being replaced by the similar Semtex Crazy. Semtex Cool, which is green in colour, was also introduced at this time.

Two sizes of original Semtex are produced – 250 ml and 500 ml. Semtex Light (like the discontinued Semtex Forte) is only available in 250 ml cans, which are 132 mm long and 52 mm in diameter.

== Ingredients ==
Semtex contains the maximum allowed amounts of caffeine and taurine, while the Semtex Forte version contains a higher concentration of glucuronolactone.

=== Key ingredients per 100 ml ===
	Semtex	Semtex Forte
Caffeine	32 mg	32 mg
Taurine	400 mg	400 mg
Glucuronolactone		240 mg
Inositol		20 mg
Vitamin C	20 mg	
Folic acid	0.06 mg	
Niacin	5.4 mg	8 mg
Pantothenic acid	1.8 mg	2 mg
Vitamin B_{2}	0.5 mg	
Vitamin B_{6}	0.6 mg	2 mg
Vitamin B_{12}		0.002 mg
Colourants	E 150, E 104	E 150
