= Duncan Koech =

Kenyan long-distance runner

Duncan Cheruiyot Koech (born 28 December 1984) is a male long-distance runner from Kenya. His personal best is 2:07:53 achieved at 2012 Cologne Marathon. He came third at the 2013 Cologne Marathon. He has won marathons in Riga, Bucharest, Hannover, and Sofia.

== Achievements ==
Year	Competition	Venue	Position	Event	Notes
Representing Kenya
2008	Hannover Marathon	Hannover, Germany	1st	Marathon	2:14:29
2010	Bucharest Marathon	Bucharest, Romania	1st	Marathon	2:13:59
2012	Cologne Marathon	Cologne, Germany	3rd	Marathon	2:07:53
2013	Riga Marathon	Riga, Latvia	1st	Marathon	2:15:34
2014	Riga Marathon	Riga, Latvia	3rd	Marathon	2:13:58
2016	Münster Marathon	Münster, Germany	1st	Marathon	2:13:00
2017	Bucharest Marathon	Bucharest, Romania	1st	Marathon	2:13:13
2021	Sofia Marathon	Sofia, Bulgaria	1st	Marathon	2:15:47
