= Rock 'n' Roll Arizona Marathon =

Annual race in the United States

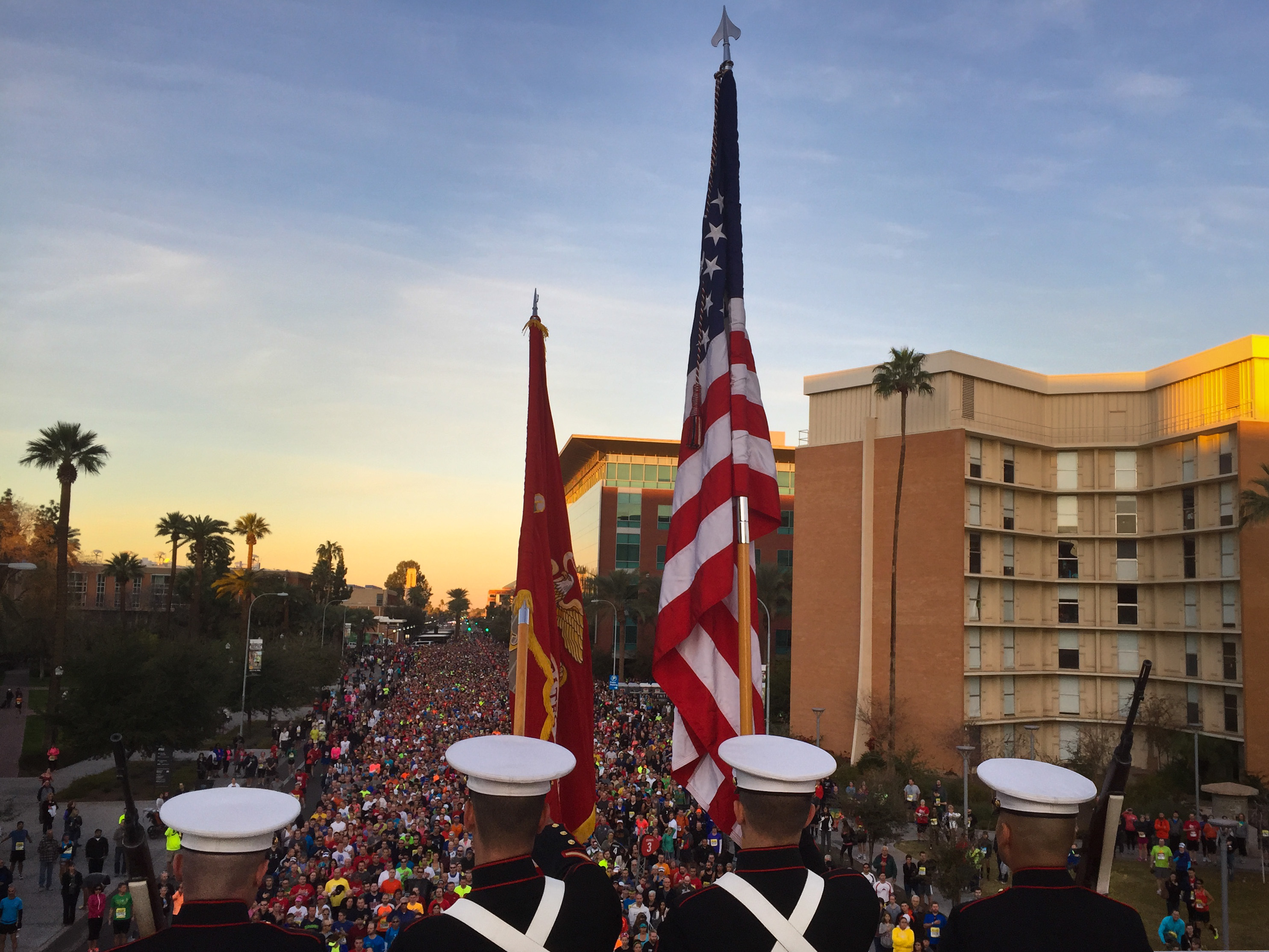
- Prerace ceremony in 2015
- Date: January
- Location: Phoenix–Tempe–Scottsdale, Arizona
- Event type: Road
- Distance: half marathon, 10k and 5k
- Established: 2004 (22 years ago)
- Course records: M: 2:10:33 (2004) (Kenya) Haron Toroitich; F: 2:30:39 (2010) (Ethiopia) Teyba Naser
- Website: Rock 'n' Roll Running Series - Arizona

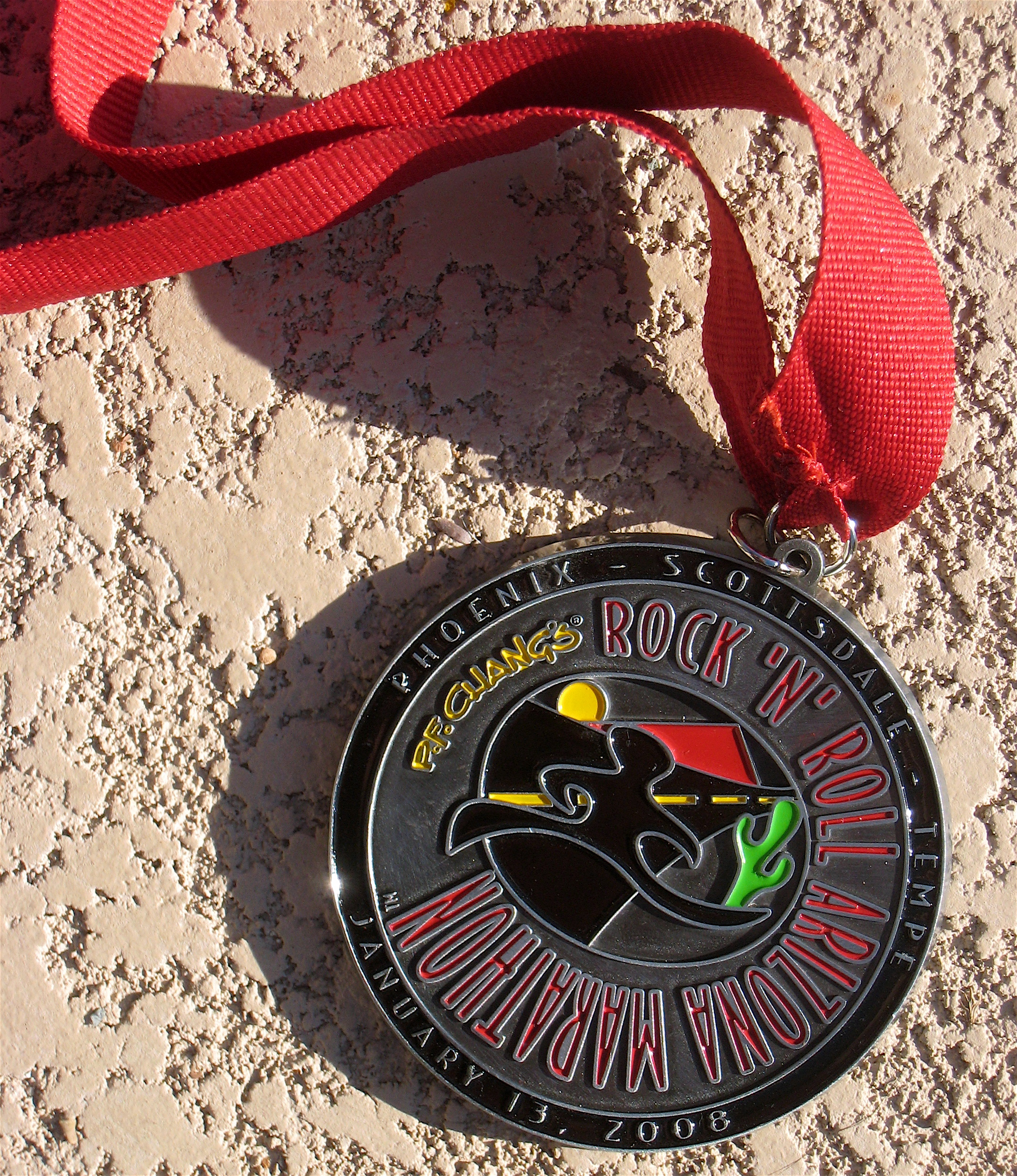
Finisher medal in 2008

The Rock 'n' Roll Arizona Running Series holds a half marathon, 10K and 5K annually in Arizona and is the first calendar race of the year in the series. On the weekend before Martin Luther King, Jr. Day, the former marathon and half-marathon courses links three cities of the Phoenix Metropolitan Area: Phoenix, Scottsdale, and Tempe. Until 2023, a full marathon distance race was offered whose time could be used to obtain a qualifying time for the Boston Marathon.

The competition attracts tens of thousands of runners each year; more than 32,000 competed in 2010. The prize money for winning either the men's or the women's marathon race was US$1,000.

Like the original Rock 'n' Roll Marathon in San Diego, it is organized by the IRONMAN Group, part of Wanda Sports Holdings. It was sponsored until 2015 by P. F. Chang's China Bistro.

== History ==
The race was first held on January 11, 2004, with 9,882 marathon finishers and 13,926 half marathon finishers in the inaugural event.

The 2021 edition of the race was cancelled due to the coronavirus pandemic.

=== World record ===
The event is noted for the half-marathon world record set by Haile Gebrselassie on January 15, 2006, who ran the second half of the marathon course in 58 minutes and 55 seconds. This part of the marathon course is slightly downhill, but is still within IAAF requirements for world record status. Gebrselassie's record stood for a year, until it was lowered by two seconds on February 9, 2007 by Samuel Wanjiru at Ras al-Khaimah.

== Course ==
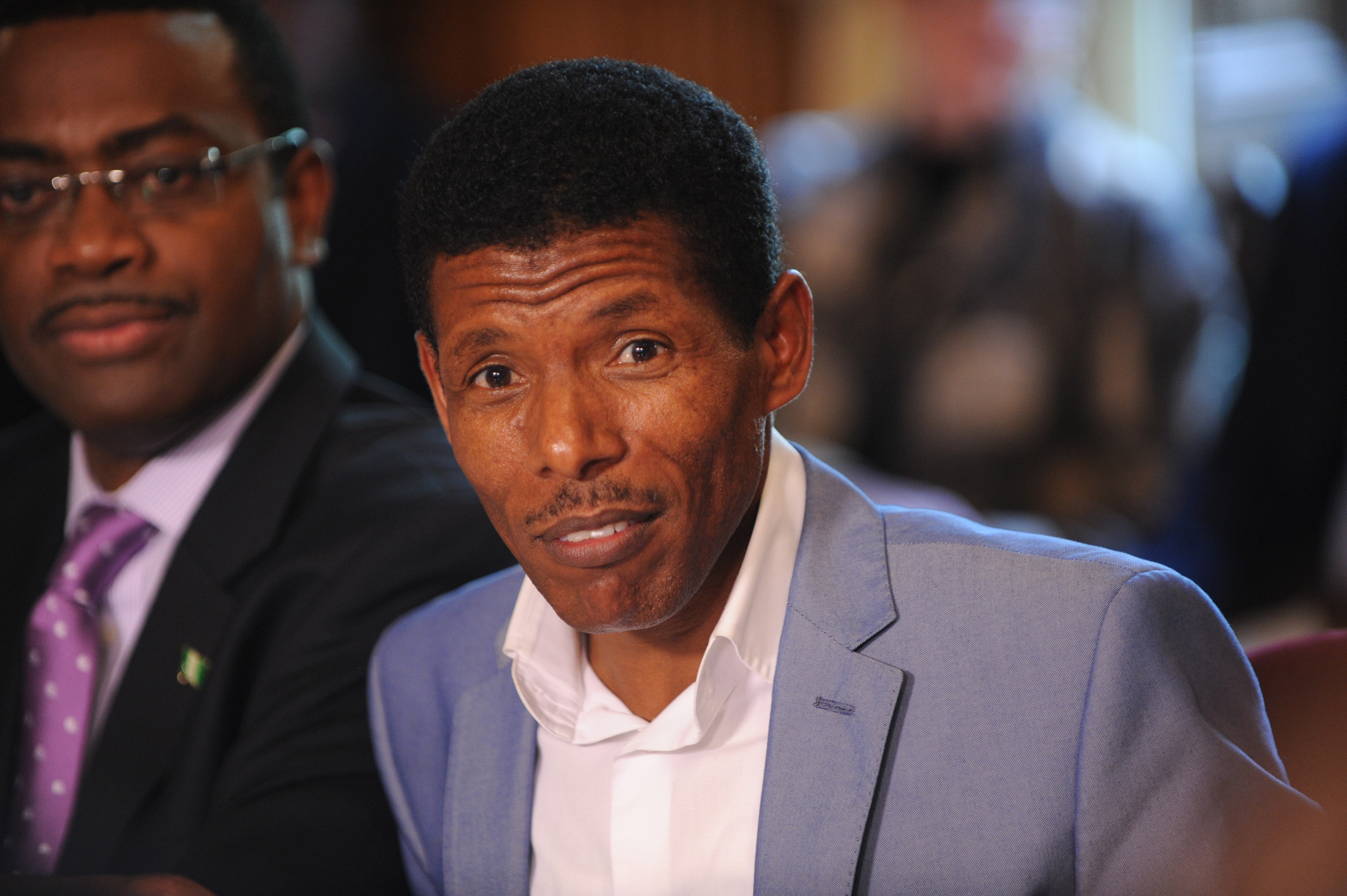
Haile Gebrselassie set a half marathon world record on the second half of the marathon course in 2006.

In prior years, both race courses started in Phoenix, however, in 2012 the courses were split. The start of the marathon is located in downtown Phoenix near the CityScape Plaza. The half marathon and newly added 10k start in Tempe. All races finish in the city of Tempe at the Tempe Beach Park. The event also includes wheelchair races starting 10 minutes and 5 minutes before the marathon and half-marathon races. The average start line temperature is around 40 °F (4 °C), and the average daily high temperature is between 50 °F and 70 °F (10 °C-21 °C).

Along the route are over 40 high school cheerleading teams and 70 bands who perform for the runners. Later in the evening there is a concert held in Tempe for all the runners, volunteers and spectators.

== Race records ==
Simon Bairu set a new men's race record for the half marathon, on January 17, 2010, with a time of 1 hour, 2 minutes, 47 seconds which was well under the previous race record of 1 hour, 4 minutes, 35 seconds set by the late Ryan Shay in 2004.

Deena Kastor set a new women's race record for the half marathon, also on January 17, 2010, with a time of 1 hour, 9 minutes, 43 seconds which also broke the state record.

== Winners ==
Key: Course record (in bold)

=== Marathon ===
Ed.	Year	Men's winner	Time	Women's winner	Time	Rf.
1	2004	Haron Toroitich (KEN)	**2:10:33**	Shitaye Gemechu (ETH)	2:31:33	
2	2005	Terefe Yae (ETH)	2:14:24	Zekiros Adanech (ETH)	2:31:14	
3	2006	Mola Shimelis (ETH)	2:13:08	Shitaye Gemechu (ETH)	2:31:44	
4	2007	Terefe Yae (ETH)	2:14:13	Zekiros Adanech (ETH)	2:31:43	
5	2008	Mike Aish (NZL)	2:13:21	Zekiros Adanech (ETH)	2:31:15	
6	2009	Moses Kigen (KEN)	2:10:36	Olena Shurkhno (UKR)	2:31:22	
7	2010	Terefe Yae (ETH)	2:12:41	Teyba Naser (ETH)	**2:30:39**	
8	2011	Josh Cox (USA)	2:17:32	Sally Meyerhoff (USA)	2:37:56	
9	2012	Peter Omae (KEN)	2:24:47	Trisha Miller (USA)	2:49:12	
10	2013	Ryan Neely (USA)	2:31:07	Christy Foster (USA)	2:44:42	
11	2014	Solomon Kandie (KEN)	2:21:00	Amy Cole (USA)	2:49:26	
12	2015	Roosevelt Cook (USA)	2:24:41	Zoila Gómez (USA)	2:46:00	
13	2016	Thomas Puzey (USA)	2:25:22	Tanaya Gallagher (USA)	2:46:44	
14	2017	Thomas Puzey (USA)	2:19:57	Bailey Drewes (USA)	2:42:50	
	2021	cancelled due to coronavirus pandemic				

=== Half marathon ===
Ed.	Year	Men's winner	Time	Women's winner	Time	Rf.
1	2004	Ryan Shay (USA)	1:04:35	Erica Larson (USA)	1:17:51	
2	2005	Thomas Lentz (USA)	1:10:53	Miho Ichikawa (JPN)	1:15:07	
3	2006	Joe Munoz (USA)	1:09:47	Heather Hanston (USA)	1:16:38	
4	2007	Mårten Boström (FIN)	1:06:33	Liz Wilson (USA)	1:18:34	
5	2008	Austin Baillie (USA)	1:07:12	Bridget Duffy (USA)	1:21:46	
6	2009	Kristopher Houghton (USA)	1:08:22	Nicky Archer (GBR)	1:20:23	
7	2010	Simon Bairu (CAN)	1:02:47	Deena Kastor (USA)	**1:09:43**	
8	2011	Shawn Forrest (AUS)	1:03:07	Madaí Pérez (MEX)	1:11:49	
9	2012	Dylan Wykes (CAN)	1:02:38	Sara Slattery (USA)	1:16:24	
10	2013	Scott MacPherson (USA)	1:05:25	Stephanie Bruce (USA)	1:15:18	
11	2014	Rob Watson (CAN)	1:05:03	Jessica Draskau-Petersson (DEN)	1:13:47	
12	2015	Benson Cheruiyot (KEN)	1:04:15	Amy Hastings (USA)	1:12:04	
13	2016	Scott Bauhs (USA)	**1:02:23**	Janet Cherobon-Bawcom (USA)	1:11:49	
14	2017	Jeffrey Eggleston (USA)	1:04:50	Neely Gracey (USA)	1:12:39	
	2021	cancelled due to coronavirus pandemic				

=== Wheelchair race ===
Date	Male winner	Representing	Time	Female winner	Representing	Time	Rf.
2009.01.18							
2008.01.13	Tyler Byers	(United States) Sterling, VA, USA	**1:45:07**				
2007.01.14	Tyler Byers	(United States) Reston, VA, USA	1:57:28				
2006.01.15	Bradley Ray	(United States) Albuquerque, NM, USA	2:18:30				
2005.01.09	Peter Hawkins	(United States) Malverne, NY, USA	2:22:03				
2004.01.11	Peter Hawkins	(United States) Malverne, NY, USA	2:09:14	Tricia Downing	(United States) Denver, CO, USA	**2:55:45**	

== See also ==
- Rock 'n' Roll Marathon Series
- List of marathon races in North America
