= Shitaye Gemechu =

Ethiopian long-distance runner

Shitaye Gemechu (born 17 June 1980) is an Ethiopian long-distance runner, who specializes in marathon races. Shitaye was the women's winner of the Rock 'n' Roll Arizona Marathon for the years 2004 - 2006. She won the 2007 edition of the Treviso Marathon.

Shitaye first came to prominence with a win at the 2001 Amsterdam Marathon. She went on to represent Ethiopia in the marathon at the World Championships in Athletics four times consecutively from 2001 to 2007. Her best finish was seventh at the 2001 edition.

She was banned for two years in 2009 after failing a test for Erythropoietin (EPO) at a race in Luxembourg. She returned to competition in 2011 and placed fourth at the Turin Marathon. At the 2012 Hong Kong Marathon she was runner-up to Misiker Demissie, crossing the line in a time of 2:31:44 hours in spite of a toe injury. She was runner-up to Ashu Kasim at the Lanzhou Marathon in June 2013.

Her husband, Asnake Fekadu, is also a marathon runner.

== Achievements ==
| Year | Competition | Venue | Position | Notes |
Representing Ethiopia
| 2001 | World Championships | Edmonton, Canada | 7th | 2:28:40 |
| 2001 | Amsterdam Marathon | Amsterdam, Netherlands | 1st | 2:28:40 |
| 2003 | World Championships | Paris, France | 10th | 2:27:26 |
| 2005 | World Championships | Helsinki, Finland | 22nd | 2:34:01 |
| 2007 | World Championships | Osaka, Japan | — | DNS |

=== Personal bests ===
- Half marathon - 1:10:46 hrs (2003)
- Marathon - 2:26:15 hrs (2002)

== See also ==
- List of doping cases in athletics
