= Barcaffe =

Coffee brand

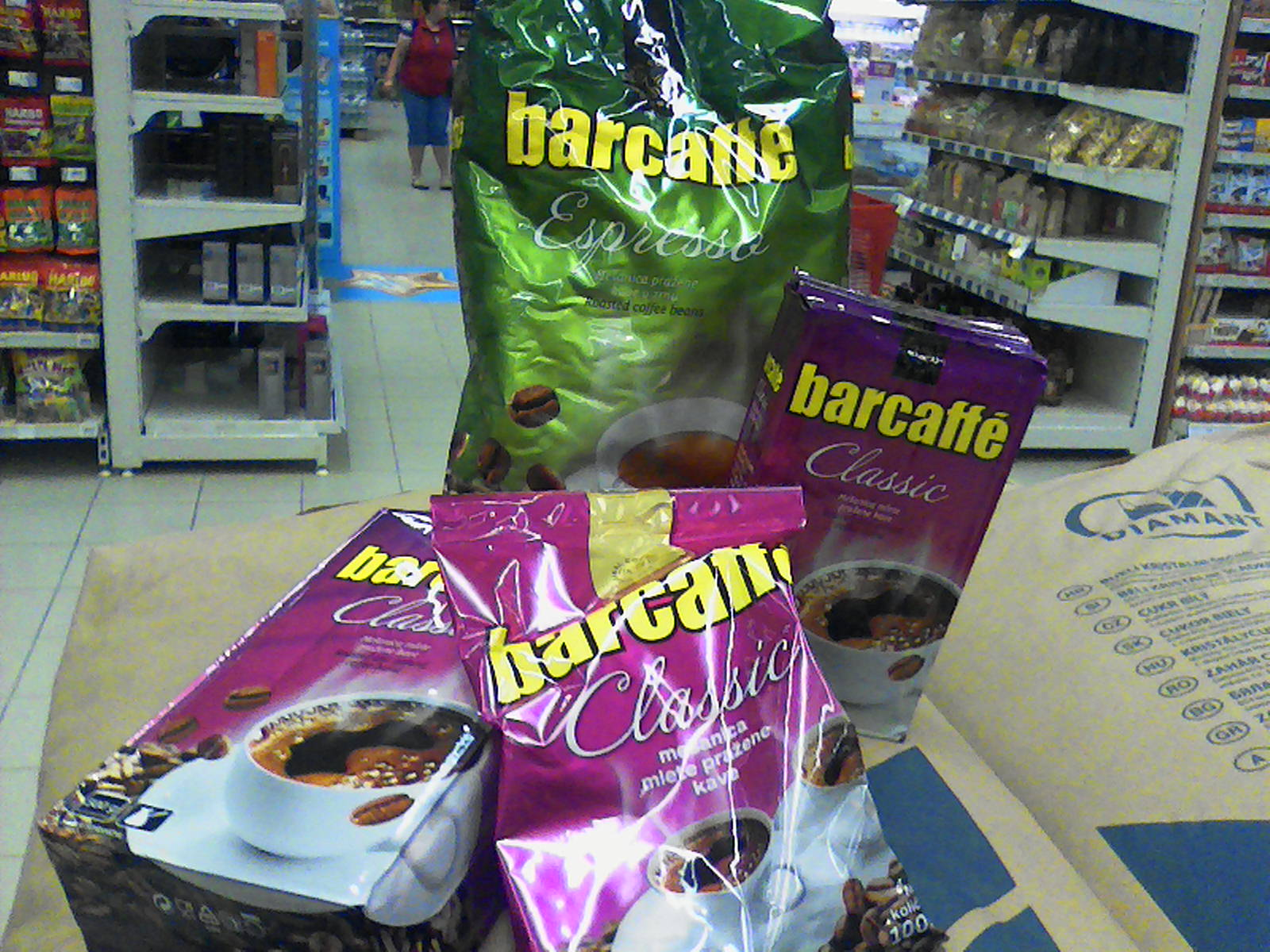
Packets of Barcaffe

Barcaffe is a Slovenian coffee brand manufactured by Atlantic Droga Kolinska.

== History ==
Barcaffe has been made in Slovenia (and its predecessor Yugoslavia) since 1970. The first product was packed in 100 gram bags. The brand is available as whole beans, ground coffee or instant coffee varieties. Recently, take-away service at local filling stations has been introduced.

Barcaffe has become the strongest coffee brand in Slovenia, with approximately 60% market share. In July 2018, Barcaffe introduced Barcaffe Divino 100% Arabica an espresso coffee mix.
