= Kofola =

Czech soft drink

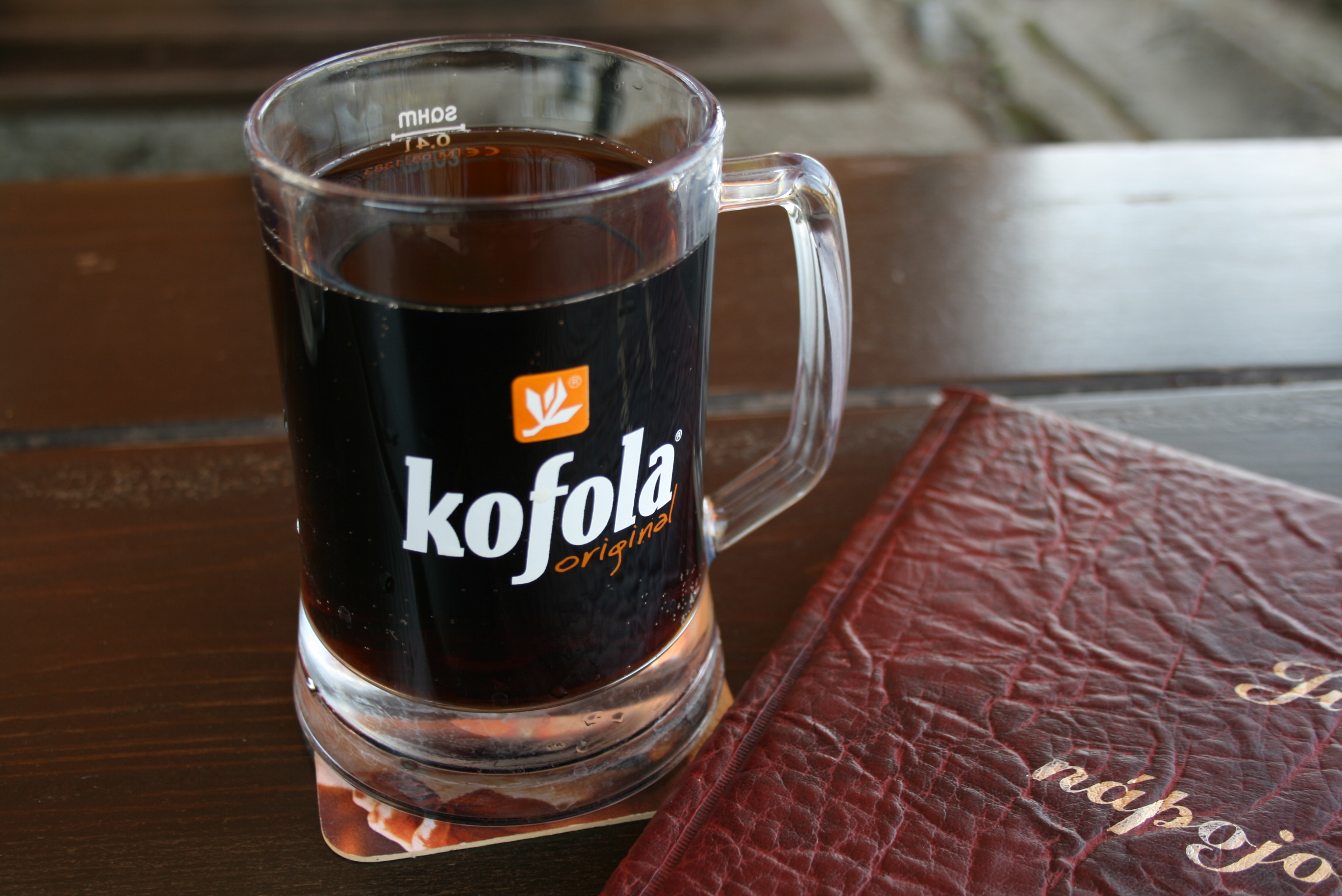
- Type: Soft drink
- Manufacturer: Kofola ČeskoSlovensko a.s.
- Origin: Czechoslovakia (present day Czech Republic and Slovakia)
- Introduced: 1960; 66 years ago
- Colour: Caramel
- Variants: Kofola Original; Meruňka/Marhuľa (apricot); Meloun/Melón (watermelon); Malina (raspberry); Ostružina (blackberry); Angrešt/Egreš (gooseberry); Guarana; Bez cukru (zero sugar); Višňa (cherry); Citrus; Vanilka (vanilla); Ananas (pineapple); Černý rybíz/Čierna ríbezľa (blackcurrant)
- Related products: Coca-Cola; Pepsi; Polo Cockta
- Website: kofola.cz

Kofola (Czech pronunciation: [ˈkofola]) is a carbonated soft drink introduced in Czechoslovakia in 1960. It was developed as a domestic alternative to Western cola drinks.

The drink is based on Kofo, a syrup developed by a team led by Zdeněk Blažek at a research institute in Prague. It is sold in bottles and served on draught in pubs and restaurants. The brand is owned by Kofola ČeskoSlovensko, based in Ostrava.

== History ==
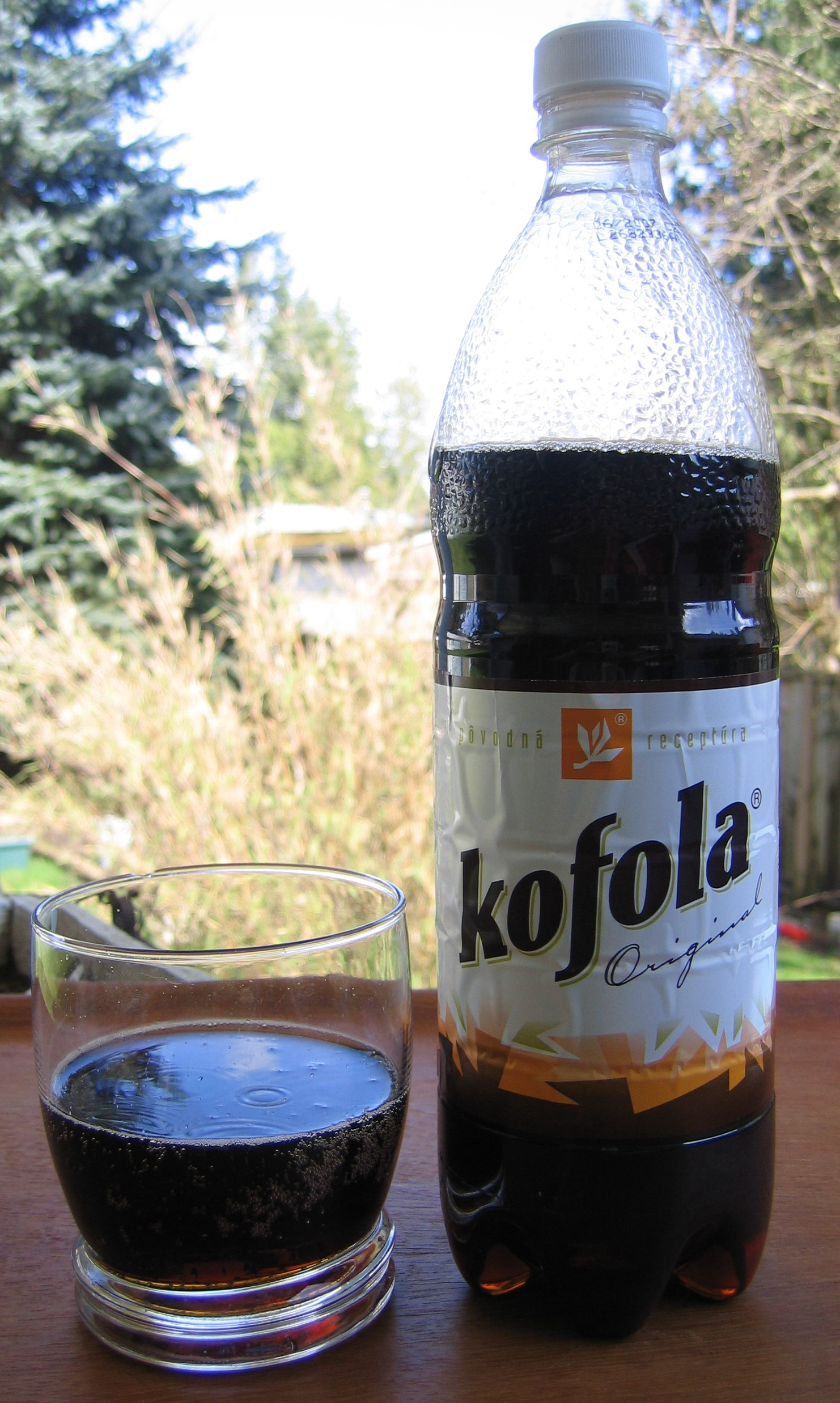
A glass and a bottle of Kofola

Kofola originated in the Czechoslovak Research Institute of Medicinal Plants in Prague in 1959, during research targeted at finding a possible use for surplus caffeine produced in the process of coffee roasting. The resulting dark-coloured, sweet-and-sour syrup, kofo, became the main ingredient of a new soft drink introduced in 1960. During the 1960s and 1970s, Kofola became popular in communist Czechoslovakia, successfully competing with Western cola drinks like Coca-Cola or Pepsi, which were generally available after 1968 (Pepsi in 1974) but were expensive. In the present day, Kofola is a popular option in restaurants, as it can be draught-poured from kegs. Since 1998, Kofola has been bottled (in addition to classic 0.33-litre glass bottles) in 0.5-litre and 2-litre plastic bottles. 0.25-litre cans were introduced in 2003, and 1-litre plastic-bottles in 2004.

== Presentation ==
Until 2000, the Kofola logo featured a coffee bean. It now resembles a coffee flower.

In 2003, Kofola created a Christmas TV commercial that became one of the most successful ads on Czech television. It was regularly screened during Christmas in subsequent years.

== Company ==
Kofola ČeskoSlovensko a.s.
- Type: Joint-stock company
- Traded as: PSE: KOFOL; WSE: KOF
- ISIN: CZ0009000121
- Headquarters: Krnov, Czech Republic
- Revenue: ▲EUR 263.6 million (2015)
- Operating income: ▲EUR 21.6 million (2015)

After the fall of the communist regime in 1989, Kofola had to compete with foreign brands that entered the new open market. In 2000, the brand was purchased by the Samaras family from Opava.

In 2008, Kofola announced a merger with the Polish lemonade producer Hoop. Later that year, the Polish private equity fund Enterprise Investors acquired 42.46% of Kofola-Hoop for approximately €140 million.

In 2009, Kofola acquired Pinelli and has since produced the energy drink Semtex. In 2014, Kofola purchased the Slovenian mineral water brand Radenska.

In 2018, the company took a 100% stake in the Czech herbal tea producer Leros.

In 2023, Kofola acquired a majority stake in Pivovary CZ Group, which produces beer under the brands Holba, Zubr, and Litovel.

== Ingredients ==
Kofo syrup, the main ingredient of Kofola, consists of 14 herbal and fruit ingredients (such as extracts from apple, cherry, currant, or herbal aroma), sugar and/or high fructose corn syrup (2014), and caramel.

== Products ==
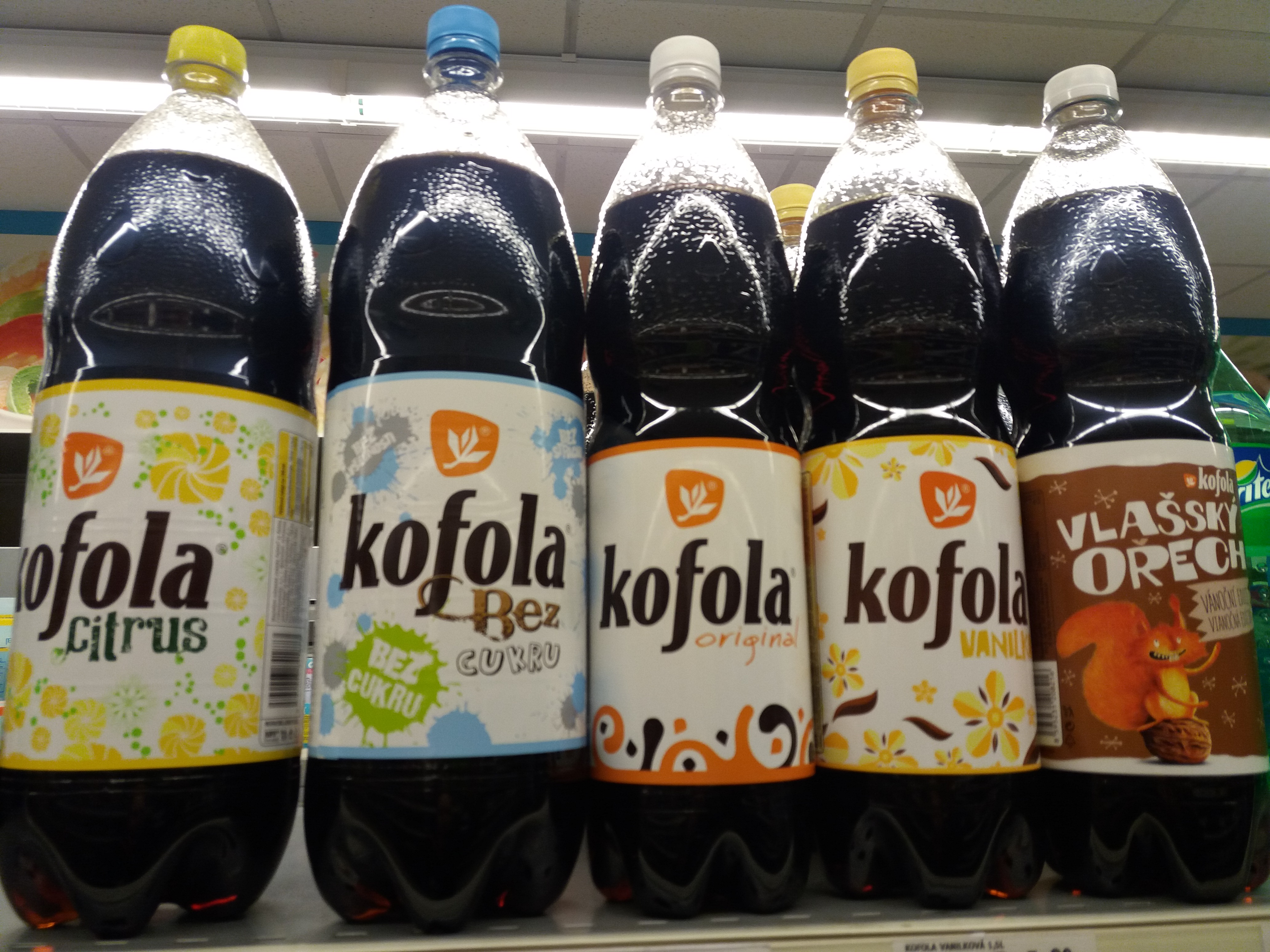
Kofola Lemon, Sugar-Free, Original, Vanilla, and Walnut

- Kofola Original
- Kofola Citrus – lemon-flavoured
- Kofola Bez Cukru – sugar-free alternative
- Kofola Višňová – sour cherry-flavoured
- Kofola Vanilka – vanilla-flavoured
- Kofola Guarana – energy drink containing guarana
- Kofola Meruňka – apricot-flavoured
- Kofola Meloun – watermelon-flavoured
- Kofola Černý Rybíz – blackcurrant-flavoured
- Kofola Malina – raspberry-flavoured
- Kofola Ostružina – blackberry-flavoured
- Kofola Ananas – pineapple-flavoured
- Kofola Grep – grapefruit-flavoured
- Kofola Angrešt – gooseberry-flavoured

== Cocktails ==
- Čeko Libre (a Czech version of the Cuba libre cocktail) is a highball made of kofola and Tuzemák.
