= Marija Vrajić =

Croatian long-distance runner

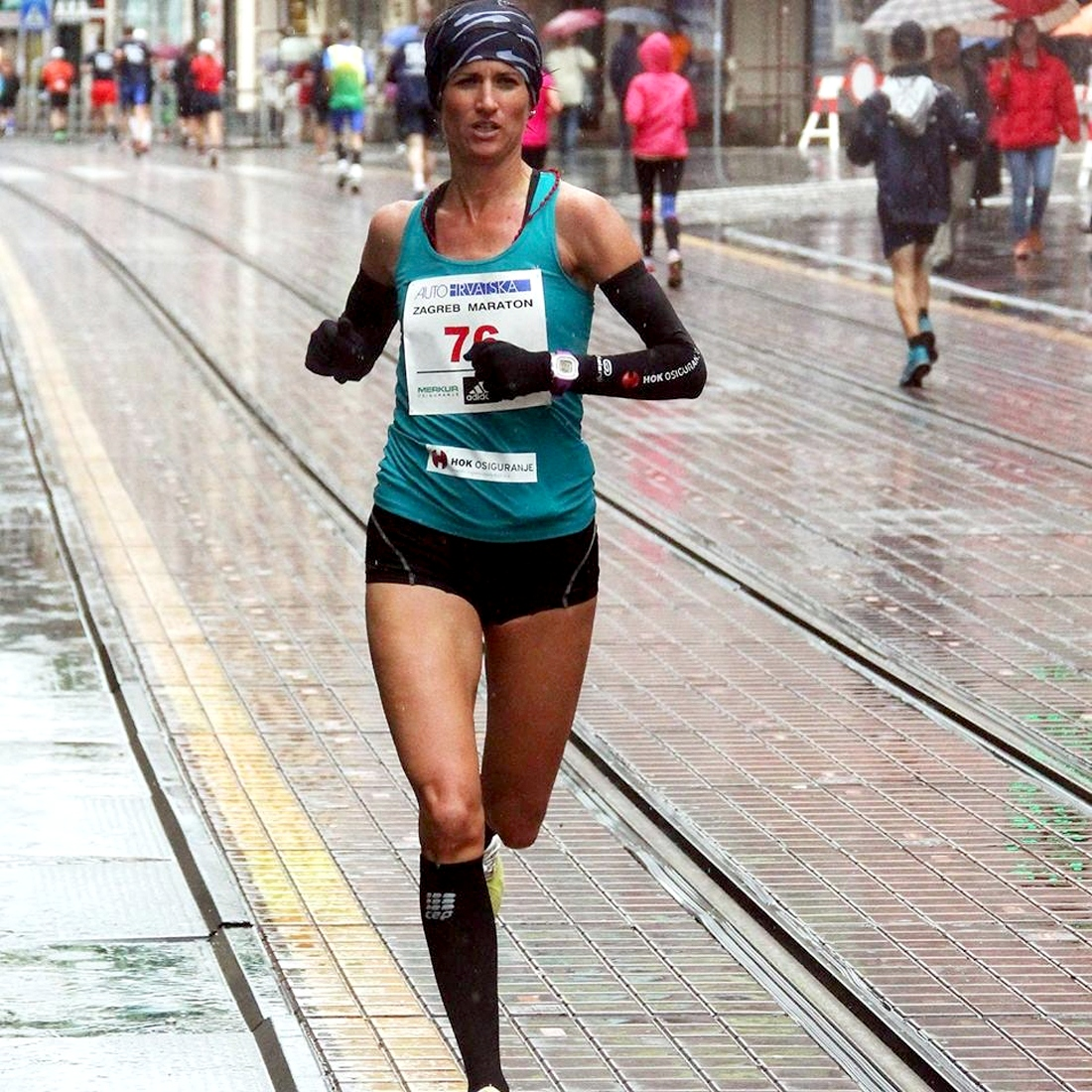

Personal information
- Nationality: Croatian
- Born: September 23, 1976 (age 49) Osijek, Croatia
- Height: 1.70 m (5 ft 7 in)
- Weight: 50.80 kg (112 lb)

Sport
- Country: Croatia
- Sport: Track and field
- Event: Marathon

Achievements and titles
- Personal best: Marathon: 2:40:41
Medal record
Women's athletics
Representing Croatia
100 km World Championships
Bronze medal – third place	2015 Winschoten	100 km

Marija Vrajić Trošić (born 23 September 1976) is a Croatian marathoner and ultra marathoner. In 2015, she took bronze at the IAU 100 km World Championships.

She was the winner of the 2009 Skopje Marathon and the 2012 Three Hearts Marathon.

In 2015, she took third by 3 seconds in the Three Hearts Marathon with a time of 2:44:57, and qualified for the 2016 Summer Olympics.

== Personal bests ==
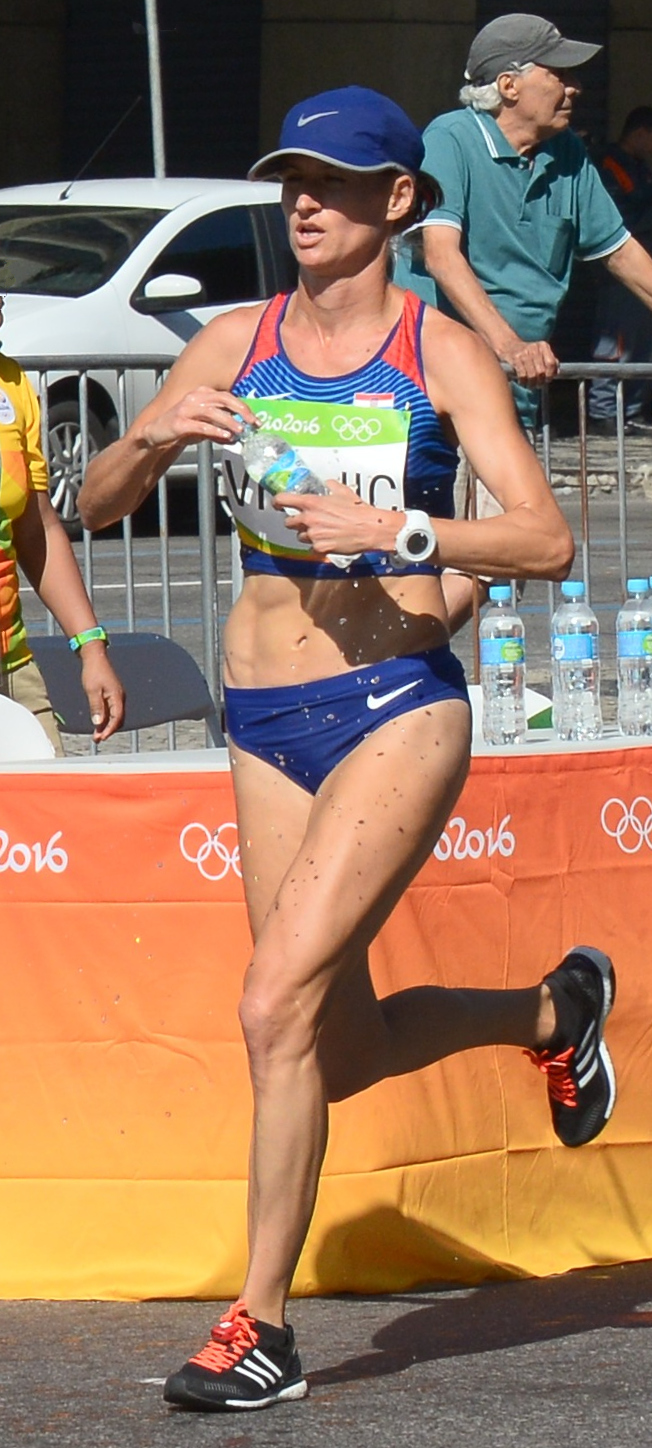
Marija Vrajić Trošić in Rio 2016.

- Marathon: 2:40:41 (Treviso, 6 March 2016)
- 100 km: 7:27:11 (Winschoten, 12 September 2015)
- 24 hours: 233.460 km (Albi, 26–27 October 2019)
