= Holba =

Brewery in Hanušovice, Czech Republic

Pivovar Holba
- Holba

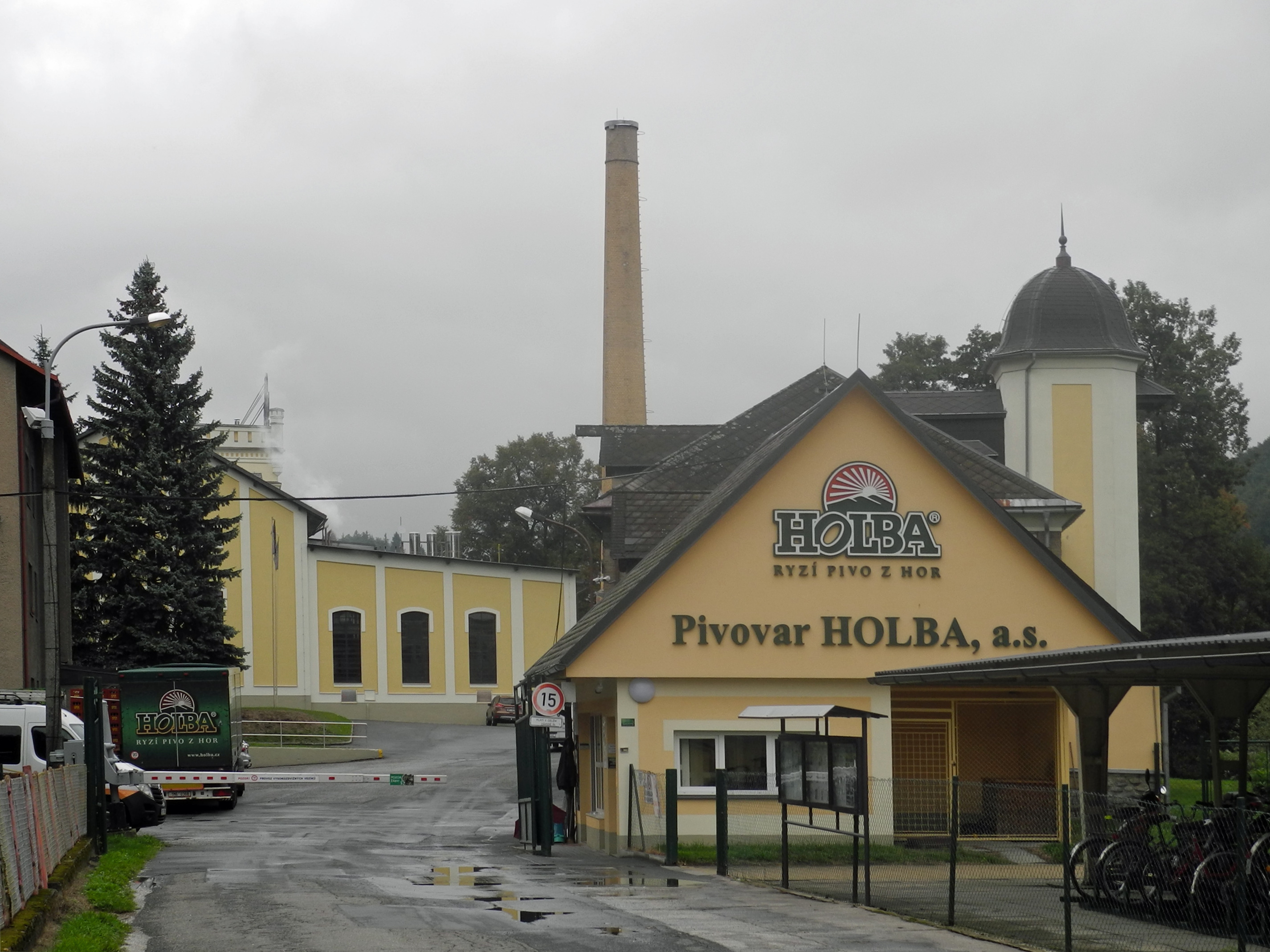
- Holba brewery
- Location: Hanušovice, Czechia
- Opened: 1874
- Owner: Pivovary CZ Group a.s.
- Website: holba.cz

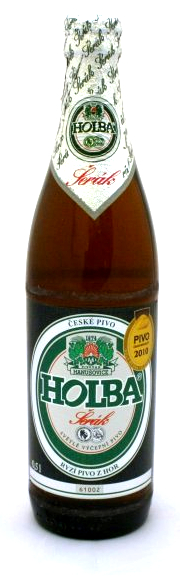
A bottle of Holba Šerák

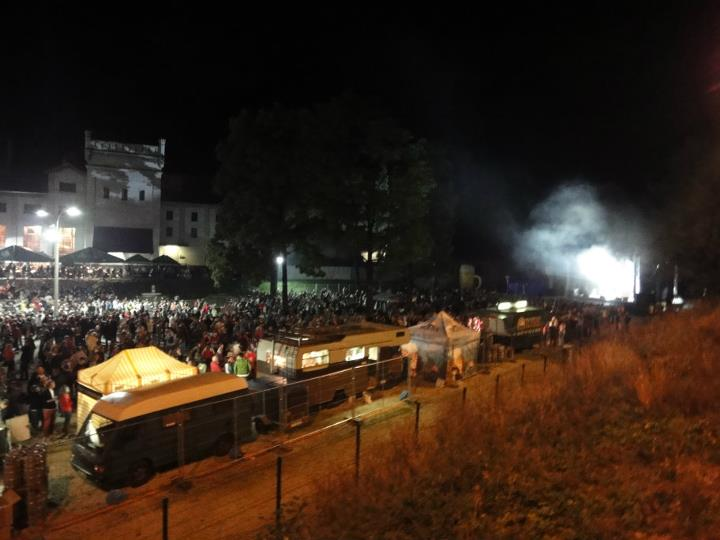
The Holba brewery during a beer festival

Pivovar Holba is a beer brewery located in Hanušovice, Czechia. The major owner is a brewer company Pivovary CZ Group a.s. Annual production is over 350,000 hectoliters. The most notable product is Holba Šerák, a medium strong beer, named after the nearby mountain. The motto of the brewery is Pure Beer from the Mountains.

== History ==
The brewery was founded by maltster Josef Müllshitzský in 1874. In 1906, the brewery became a part of joint-stock company named Nordmährische Brauerei und Malzfabriks Aktiengesselschaft im Mährisch Schönberg. The brewery was third largest Czechoslovak beer producer during interwar period. In 1948, the brewery was nationalized by communist regulation and became non-independent part of Severomoravské pivovary Přerov, the national enterprise. Producing of Holba Šerák brand was started in 1983. The Czechoslovak republic government launched economic transformation after Velvet revolution in 1990s; a major goal was disposing of enormous nationalized property. Therefore the joint-stock company Holba a.s. was created, the PMS Přerov a.s. has become major owner in 1995. The brewery was acquired by Kofola in 2023.

== Marketing and PR ==
=== Marketing ===
A slogan is Ryzí pivo z hor, literally Pure beer from the mountains. Company marketing is strongly connected with locality of the brewery which is situated close to High Ash Mountains. Posters almost always contain mountain motives. The product Holba Šerák is named after well known Šerák peak. The enterprise finances maintenance of hiking trails and is generous sponsor of sport events taking place in the mountains. The company also participates in art project Alois Nebel.

=== PR ===
The brewery organizes two popular events. The Pivovarská čtvrtka is an undemanding sport event and The Pivovarské slavnosti is a music and beer festival taking place in brewery. Last year attendance of The pivovarská čtvrtka was 3238 persons and of The Pivovarské slavnosti was more over 7000 people.

== Products ==
Classic, Šerák, Šerák Polotmavý, Premium, Free, Horské Byliny and occasionally special lager are sold in bottles (some also in cans), rest of the production is sold only in kegs and barrels.

- Holba Classic – pilsener light lager, containing 4.2% of alcohol (canned version contains 3.5%)
- Holba Šerák – pilsener light lager, containing 4.7% of alcohol, flagship product
- Holba Šerák polotmavý – pilsener amber lager, containing 4.7% of alcohol
- Holba Premium – pilsener pale lager, containing 5.2% of alcohol
- Holba Free – pale non-alcoholic beer
- Holba Horské byliny – beer mixed with a soft drink, containing 2.5% of alcohol
- Holba Brusinka s mátou – beer mixed with a soft drink, containing 2.2% of alcohol
- Holba Kvasničák – unfiltered pilsener pale lager, containing 4,7% of alcohol and yeast
- Holba Šerák 13,51° – pilsener special pale lager, containing 6,2% of alcohol
