= Radenci =

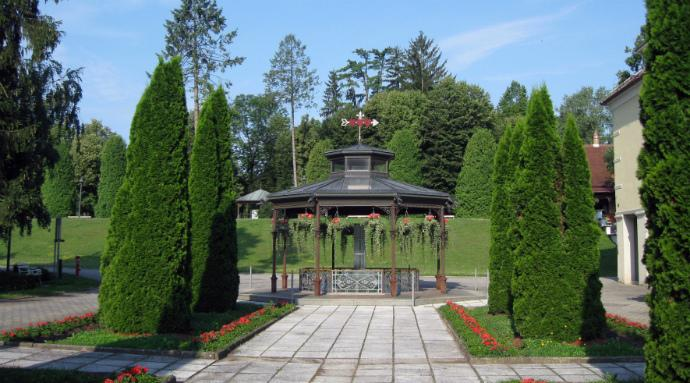
- Radenska spring.

- Location in Slovenia
- Coordinates: 46°38′34″N 16°2′43″E
- Country: Slovenia
- Traditional region: Styria
- Statistical region: Mura
- Municipality: Radenci

Area
  - Total: 3.00 km^{2} (1.16 sq mi)
- Elevation: 201.7 m (662 ft)

Population (2020)
  - Total: 2,171

Radenci (pronounced [ˈɾaːdɛntsi]; German: Bad Radein) is a town on the right bank of the Mura River in the Mura Statistical Region of northeastern Slovenia. It is a well-known spa town and was first mentioned in written documents dating back to 1436. After 1833, when a new source of mineral water was discovered, it developed into a popular resort. Since 1994 it has been the seat and the largest settlement of the Municipality of Radenci.

== History ==
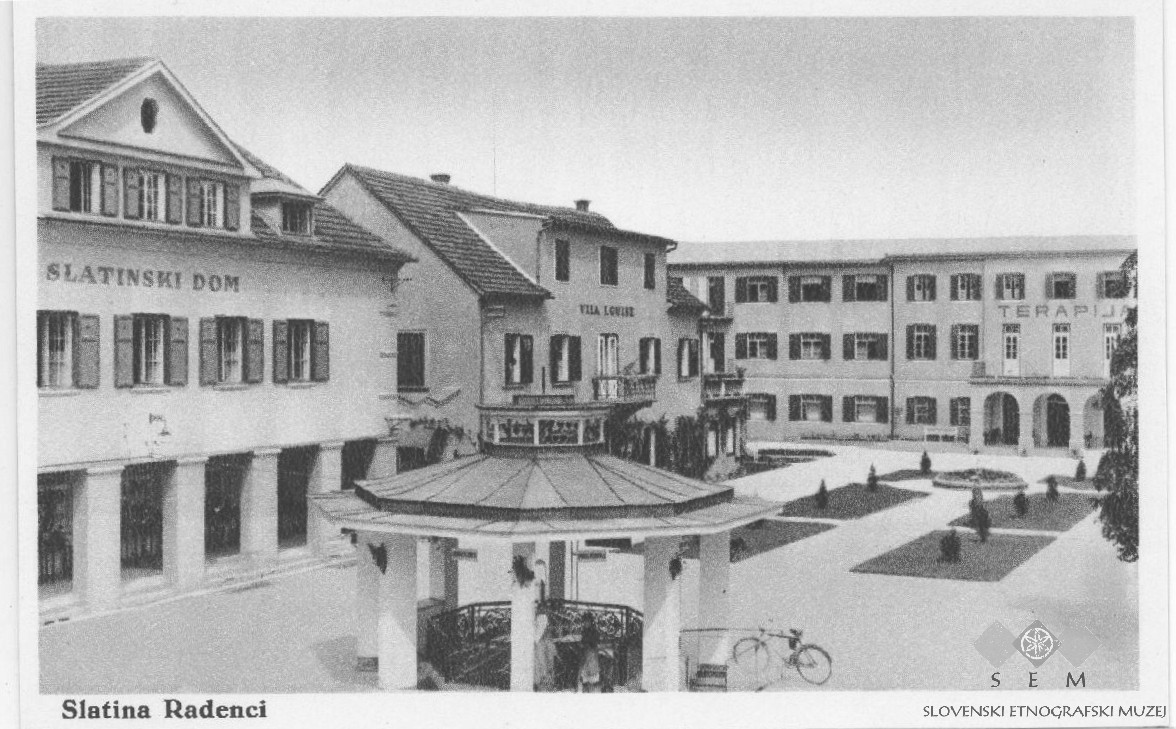

Radenci was first mentioned in 1436 under the name Radein. In 1833 Karol F. Henn, at the time still a student of medicine, discovered the mineral water there. According to a local legend, strange sounds and bubbling coming from the ground was believed to be the sounds of witches cooking soup deep underground. While passing by the mineral water spring in a carriage on the way to nearby Ljutomer, Henn overheard the sounds of the bubbling water. He took some samples of the water for analysis and returned to Radenci after 32 years, in 1869, at that time already a renowned doctor and expert in balneology. He bought the property together with the mineral spring, and in 1869 the first mineral water, named "Radeiner Sauerbrunn," flowed from the spring.

The same year he bottled the first "Radenska Three Hearts" mineral water, which was later supplied to the emperor's court in Vienna and to the pope's palace in Rome. The mineral water became known for its healing effects, and in 1882 the first guests were welcomed to the health resort and the town later developed into a thermal spa health resort.

== See also ==
- Radenska d.d.
- Three Hearts Marathon
