= Radenska =

Slovenian mineral water brand

- Logo of Radenska

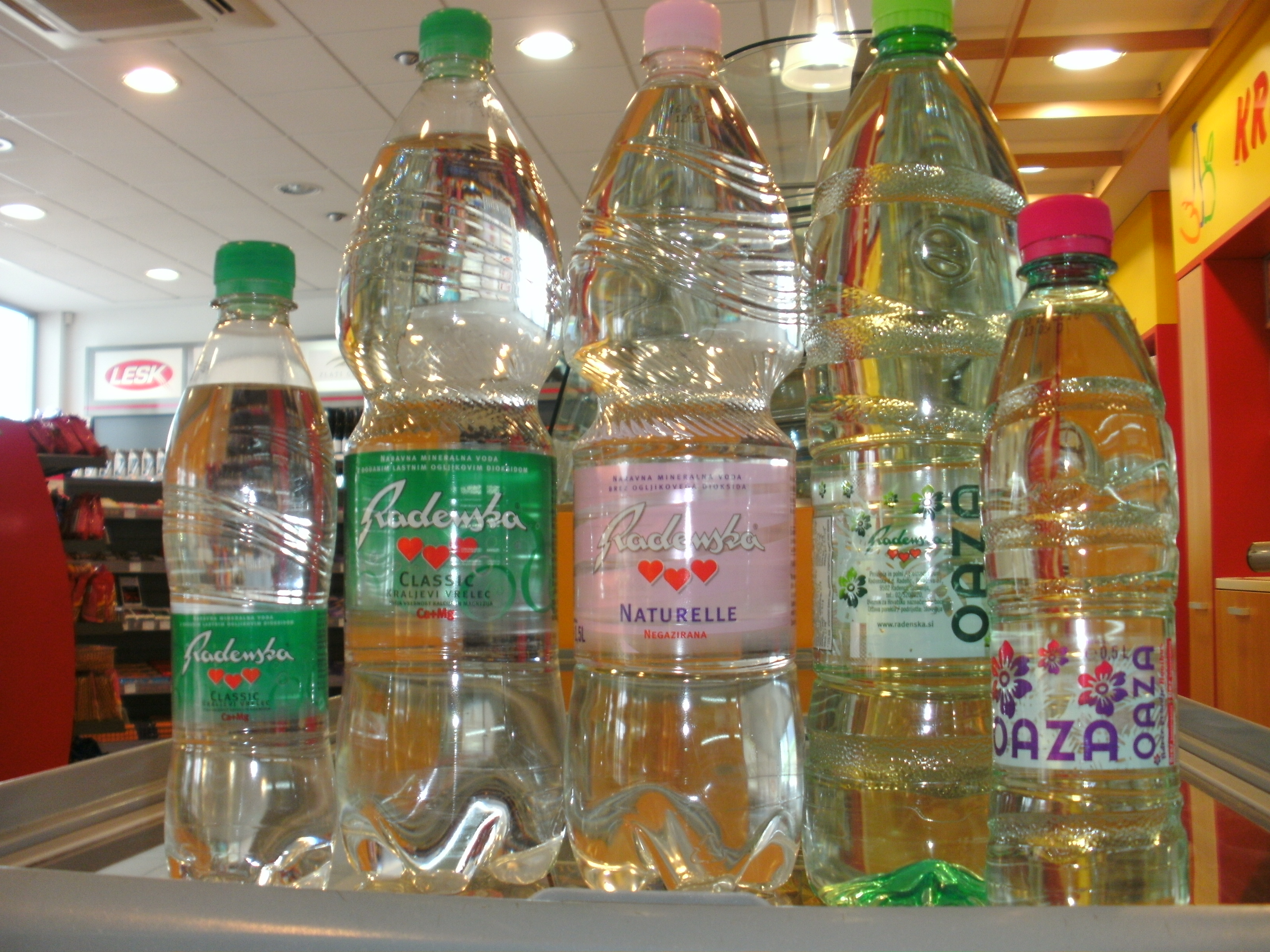
- Radenska mineral water
- Country: Slovenia
- Introduced: 1869; 157 years ago
- Source: Radenci
- Type: Mineral water
- Calcium (Ca): 220
- Chloride (Cl): 44
- Bicarbonate (HCO_{3}): 2000
- Magnesium (Mg): 95
- Potassium (K): 70
- Sodium (Na): 400
- Sulfate (SO_{4}): 72
- Website: radenska.si
- All concentrations in milligrams per liter (mg/L); pH without units

Radenska is a Slovenia-based worldwide known brand of mineral water, a trademark of Radenska d.o.o. It is one of the oldest Slovenian brands.

== Brand history ==
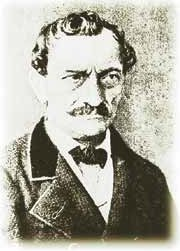
Karl Henn

Development of the mineral water company started at Radenci in 1869, when Karl Henn, owner of the land, filled the first bottles of mineral water.

In December 2014, the Czech beverage company Kofola acquired Radenska from the Slovenian government at a valuation of approximately 70M Euros.

== Three hearts ==
Mineral water brand name Radenska Three Hearts (Radenska Tri srca) has been in use since 1936. It was designed in 1931 by the illustrator Milko Bambič. The three hearts are said to symbolise three former nations of the Kingdom of Yugoslavia: Serbs, Croats, and Slovenes.

== See also ==
- Donat Mg
