= Hanušovice =

- Town
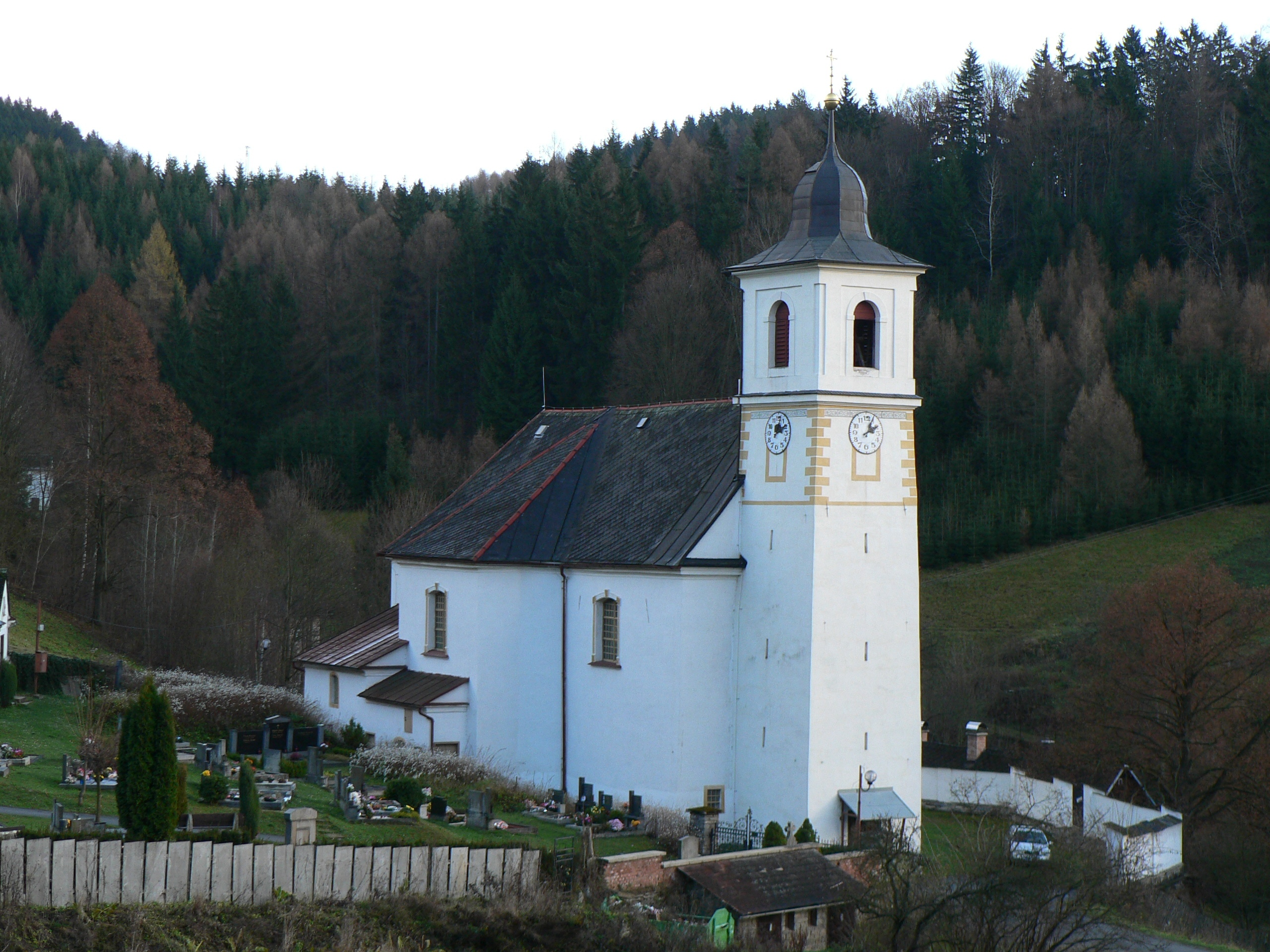
- Church of Saint Nicholas

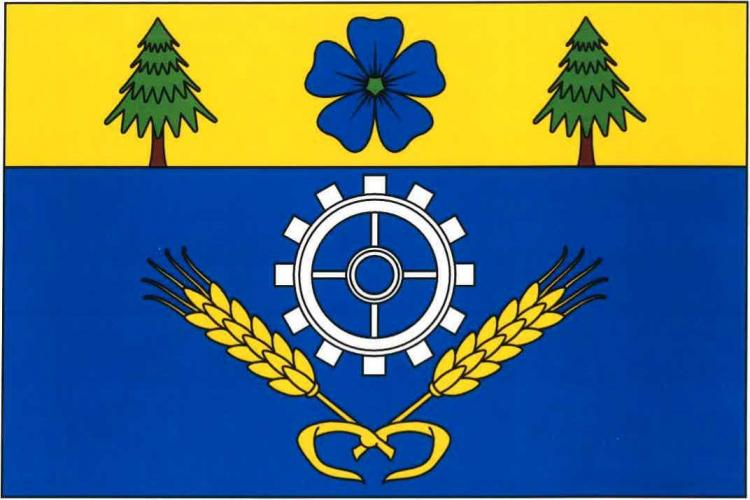
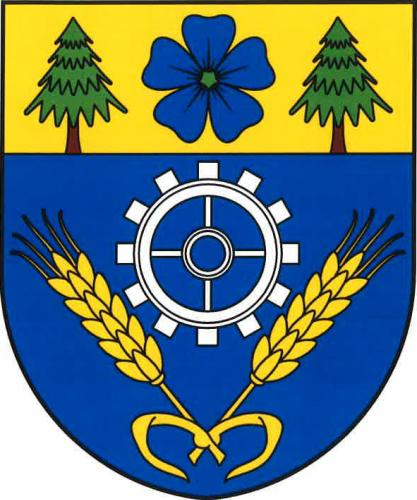
- Flag Coat of arms

- Location in the Czech Republic
- Coordinates: 50°4′50″N 16°56′11″E
- Country: Czech Republic
- Region: Olomouc
- District: Šumperk
- First mentioned: 1325

Government
  - Mayor: Marek Kostka

Area
  - Total: 36.81 km^{2} (14.21 sq mi)
- Elevation: 400 m (1,300 ft)

Population (2026-01-01)
  - Total: 2,837
  - Density: 77.07/km^{2} (199.6/sq mi)
- Time zone: UTC+1 (CET)
  - Summer (DST): UTC+2 (CEST)
- Postal code: 788 33
- Website: www.hanusovice.info

Hanušovice (Czech pronunciation: [ˈɦanuʃovɪtsɛ]; German: Hannsdorf) is a town in Šumperk District in the Olomouc Region of the Czech Republic. It has about 2,800 inhabitants. The Holba brewery is located in the town.

== Administrative division ==
Hanušovice consists of five municipal parts (in brackets population according to the 2021 census):

- Hanušovice (2,522)
- Hynčice nad Moravou (89)
- Potůčník (102)
- Vysoké Žibřidovice (69)
- Žleb (37)

== Etymology ==
The name of Hanušovice is derived from its original name Hanns Dorf / Hanušova ves, meaning "Hanns'/Hanuš's village".

== Geography ==
Hanušovice is located about 12 kilometres (7 mi) north of Šumperk and 58 km (36 mi) northwest of Olomouc. It lies in the Hanušovice Highlands. A small part of the municipal territory in the north extends into the Králický Sněžník mountains and includes the highest point of Hanušovice, a contour line at 990 m (3,248 ft) above sea level. The town is situated in a narrow valley at the confluence of the Morava and Branná rivers.

== History ==
The first written mention of Hanušovice is from 1325. The village was burned down during the Bohemian–Hungarian War (1468–1478) and renewed a hundred years later. In the 16th century, the hamlet of Holba was founded. Hanušovice was originally an agricultural village, but became industrialised in 1852 after the cotton mill was established. In 1923, Hanušovice and Holba were merged. The municipality became a town in 1975.

Hanušovice was originally ethnically a German village. During World War II, the Gross Rosen concentration camp was located nearby. After the war, the whole German-speaking population was expelled and Hanušovice was resettled by Czechs.

Hanušovice was damaged during the 1997 and 2024 floods.

== Demographics ==
Historical population

Year	Pop.	±%
1869	2,799	—
1880	3,373	+20.5%
1890	3,722	+10.3%
1900	3,924	+5.4%
1910	4,285	+9.2%

Year	Pop.	±%
1921	4,181	−2.4%
1930	4,841	+15.8%
1950	2,919	−39.7%
1961	3,156	+8.1%
1970	3,051	−3.3%

Year	Pop.	±%
1980	3,416	+12.0%
1991	3,754	+9.9%
2001	3,599	−4.1%
2011	3,253	−9.6%
2021	2,819	−13.3%

Source: Censuses

== Economy ==
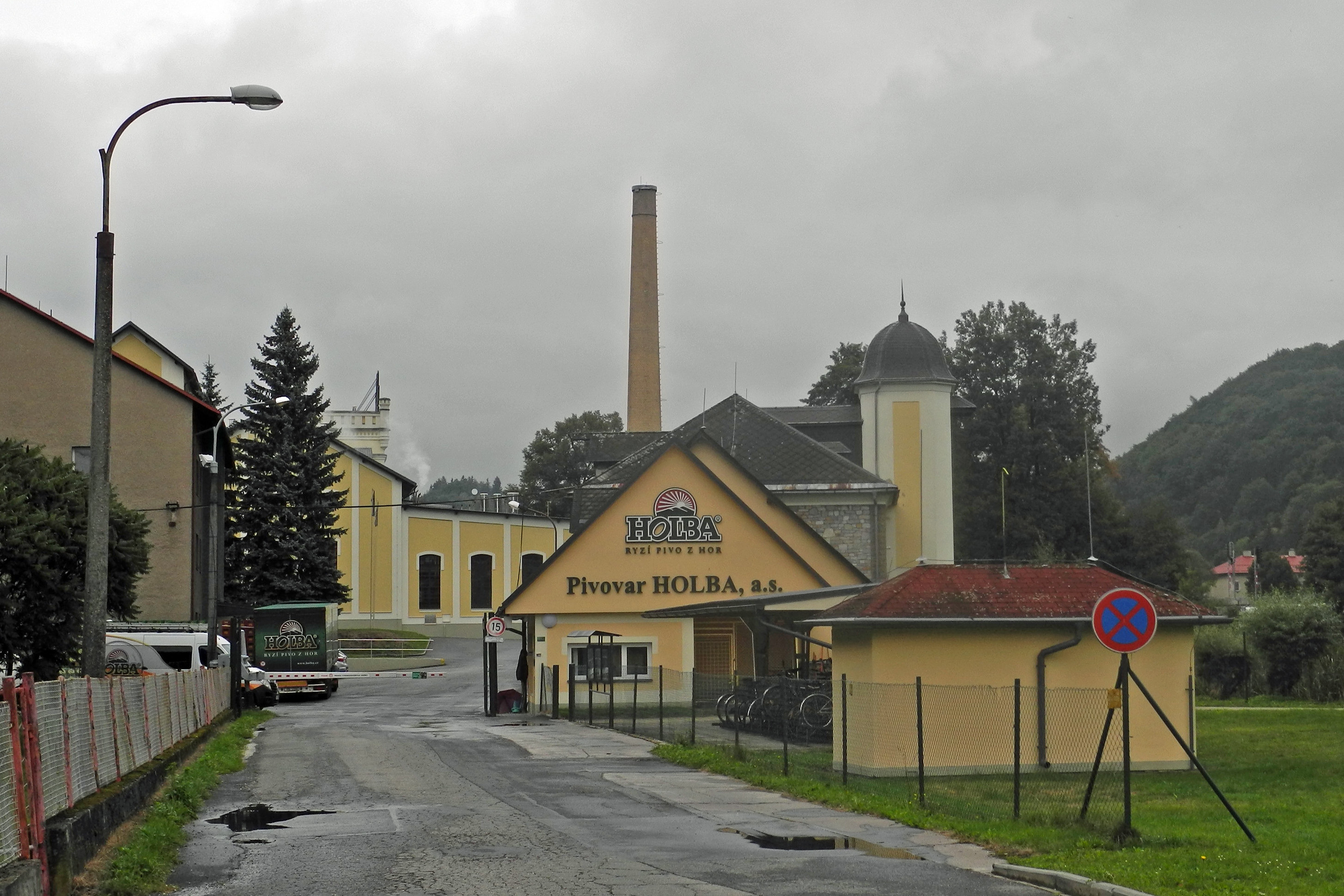
Holba brewery

Hanušovice is known for the Holba brewery, founded in 1874.

== Transport ==
Hanušovice lies on two railway lines: Šumperk–Jeseník and Zábřeh–Jeseník. The town is served by five train stations: Hanušovice, Hanušovice zastávka, Hanušovice-Holba, Potůčník and Vysoké Žibřidovice.

== Culture ==
The town hosts a beer festival every year, known as Pivovarské slavnosti ("Brewery festivities"). It is organised by the Holba Brewery and is situated in the brewery's areal. Two stages are presented with music performances are presented. Special kinds of beers are prepared.

== Sights ==
The main landmark is the Church of Saint Nicholas with a Renaissance core from 1656. It was reconstructed in the Baroque style in 1783. The church complex includes a Baroque statue of Saint John of Nepomuk from 1748 and a Marian column from 1825 in the Empire style.

The Empire building of the rectory dates from the 1830s.

There is a small museum in the brewery.

== Notable people ==
- Arnold Walter (1902–1973), Canadian musicologist and composer

== Twin towns – sister cities ==
Hanušovice is twinned with:

- Nitrianske Pravno, Slovakia
