= ProCredit Bank (Romania) =

Coordinates: 44.449201°N 26.083079°E

ProCredit Bank S.A.
- Formerly: Banca de Microfinantare MIRO SA
- Industry: Financial services
- Founded: Bucharest, Romania (2002)
- Headquarters: Strada Buzesti, nr. 62 - 64, sector 1, Bucharest 11017, Romania
- Number of locations: 4 as of 5 January 2022
- Number of employees: 783 as of 31 December 2011
- Website: www.procreditbank.ro

ProCredit Bank is a commercial bank based in Bucharest (Romania) which is a subsidiary of German lender ProCredit Bank and therefore of the group ProCredit Holding.

== History ==
ProCredit Bank was founded in 2002 as Banca de Microfinantare MIRO and was renamed in December 2004.

In 2013, the bank signed loan guarantee agreements with the European Investment Fund in order to give small and medium businesses in Romania better access to loans.

The bank experienced significant growth over the period from 2005 until 2009..

== See also ==
- List of banks in Romania
