= Dacia Felix Bank =

Romanian bank

Dacia Felix Bank (Romanian: Banca Dacia Felix, BDF) was the second private bank established in Romania after the Romanian Revolution. It was founded in Cluj-Napoca in March 1991.

At that time, the Caritas Ponzi scheme was running out in the same city and, together, Dacia Felix Bank and Caritas circulated one third of the Romanian money supply in the early 1990s.

As in the banking sector there were no regulations in the year of its establishment, the founders of the bank, including Mircea Horia Hossu and Sever Mureșan, established it as a trading company without the National Bank of Romania (BNR). After attracting money from the population's deposits, Dacia Felix Bank started to have problems in 1996 due to bad loans. A criminal investigation conducted since that year was encountered difficulties: Daniel Morar, at that time prosecutor of the Cluj Tribunal and later Judge of the Constitutional Court, remembered that the bank refused to send to the prosecutors the documents they had requested for the investigation. On 5 July 1996, the Ministry of Internal Affairs announced that Sever Mureșan and Mircea Horia Hossu were suspects of carrying out operations by which the bank was injured by about 2000 billion lei, and that the volume of the bad investments at that time represented about 70% of the total investments. In 1997, the bank was taken over by a group of Israeli investors, which initially avoided bankruptcy, winning the lawsuit filed by the CEC Bank and the BNR. However, in 2000, the BNR demanded again bankruptcy, with PricewaterhouseCoopers as liquidator. Their report showed that the collapse of the bank was caused by the taking over of the bank by its shareholders in violation of the banking law and the practice of unfair business.

During this time, Mureșan and Hossu were investigated. Hossu was sentenced in 2000 to 10 years in prison for bribery as he received cash in exchange of bad loans. He was caught in France in 2007 and was extradited to Romania, being released after the performance of about half of the sentence. Mureșan was acquitted in 2005 due to the statute of limitations, but was forced to pay about $100 million to cover the incurred damages.

== See also ==
- List of banks in Romania
