= BCR Tower Sibiu =

Office building in Sibiu, Romania

Coordinates: 45.7896°N 24.1471°E

BCR Tower
- Interactive map of the BCR Tower area

General information
- Status: Completed
- Location: Sibiu, Romania
- Construction started: 2002
- Opening: 2001
- Owner: Banca Comercială Română

Height
- Roof: 56 m (184 ft)

Technical details
- Floor count: 13
- Floor area: 12,000 m^{2} (130,000 sq ft)

BCR Tower is an office building located in the city of Sibiu, Romania. It stands at a height of 56 meters and has 13 floors, with a total surface area of 12,000 m^{2}.
