= List of banks in Romania =

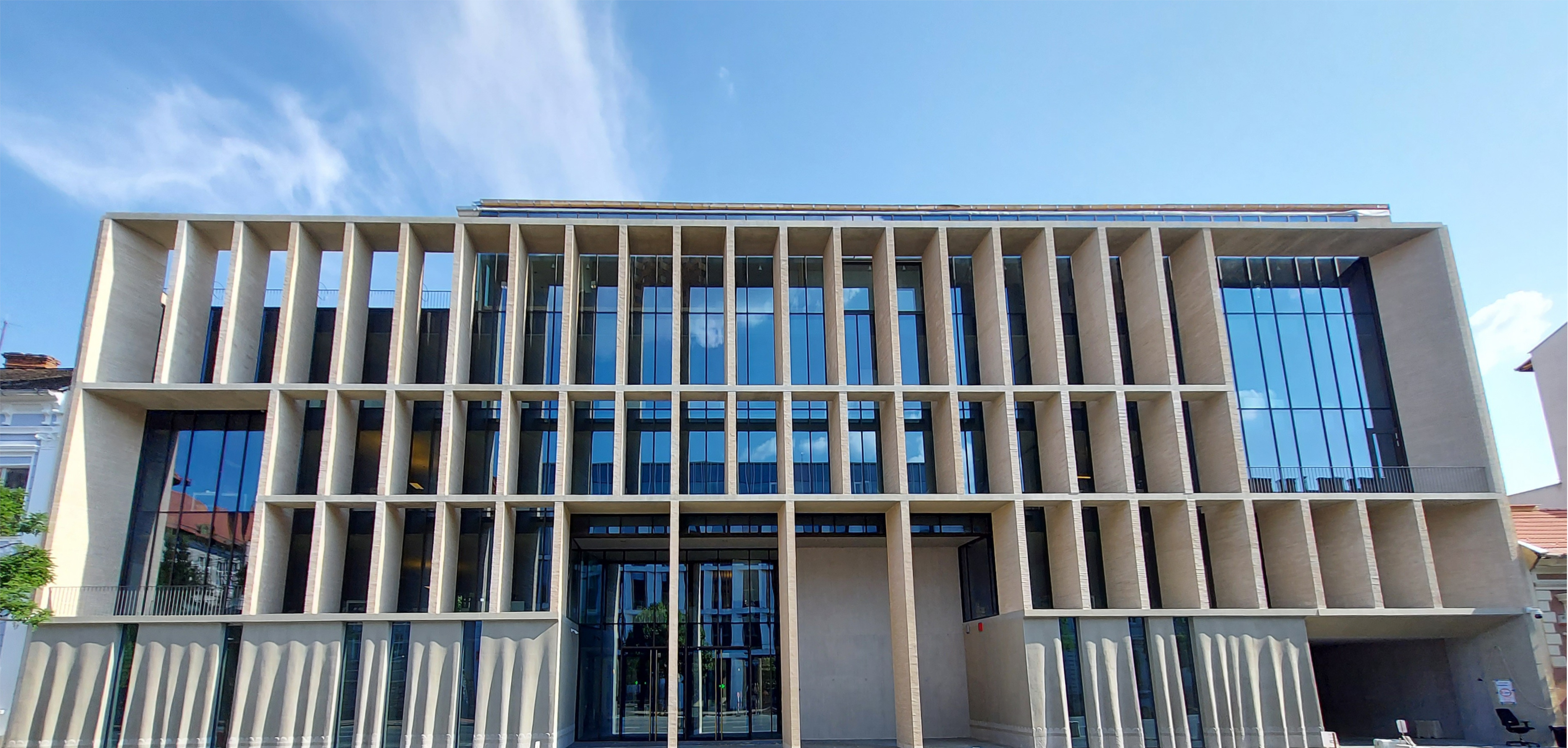
Banca Transilvania head office, Cluj-Napoca

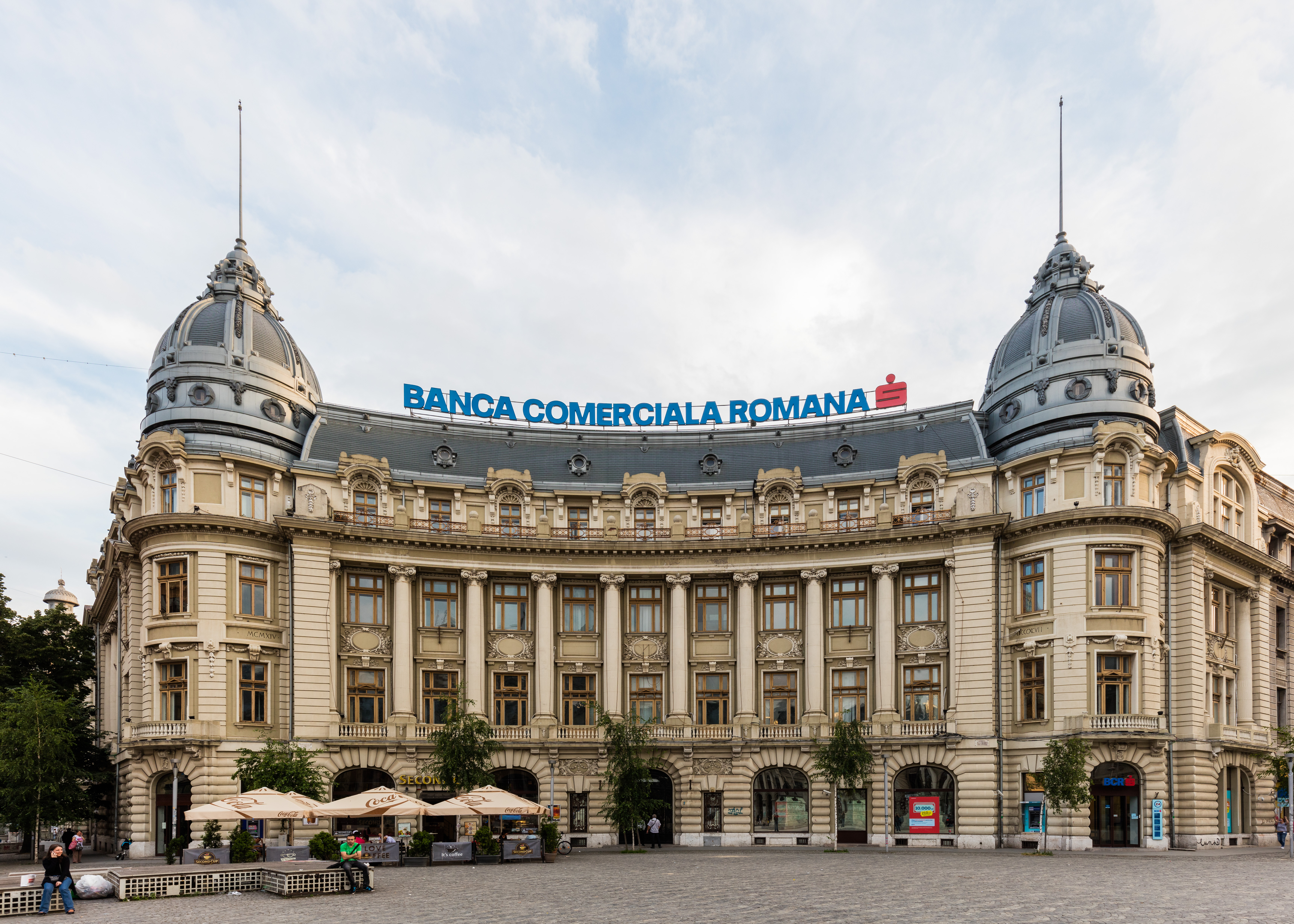
Historic building of Banca Comercială Română, Bucharest

Unicredit Tower Bucharest, head office of UniCredit Bank Romania

BRD head office, Bucharest

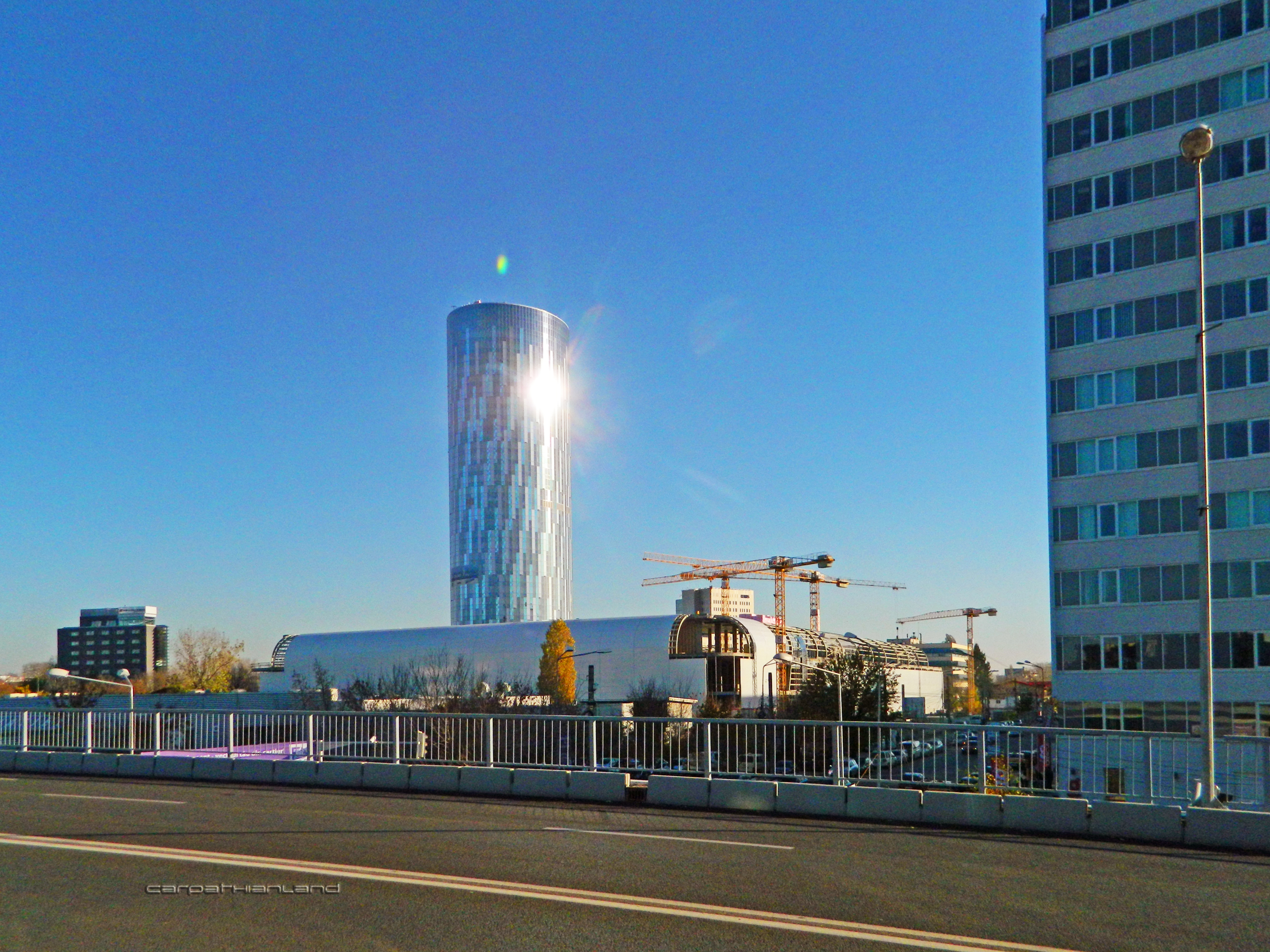
Sky Tower Bucharest, head office of Raiffeisen Bank Romania

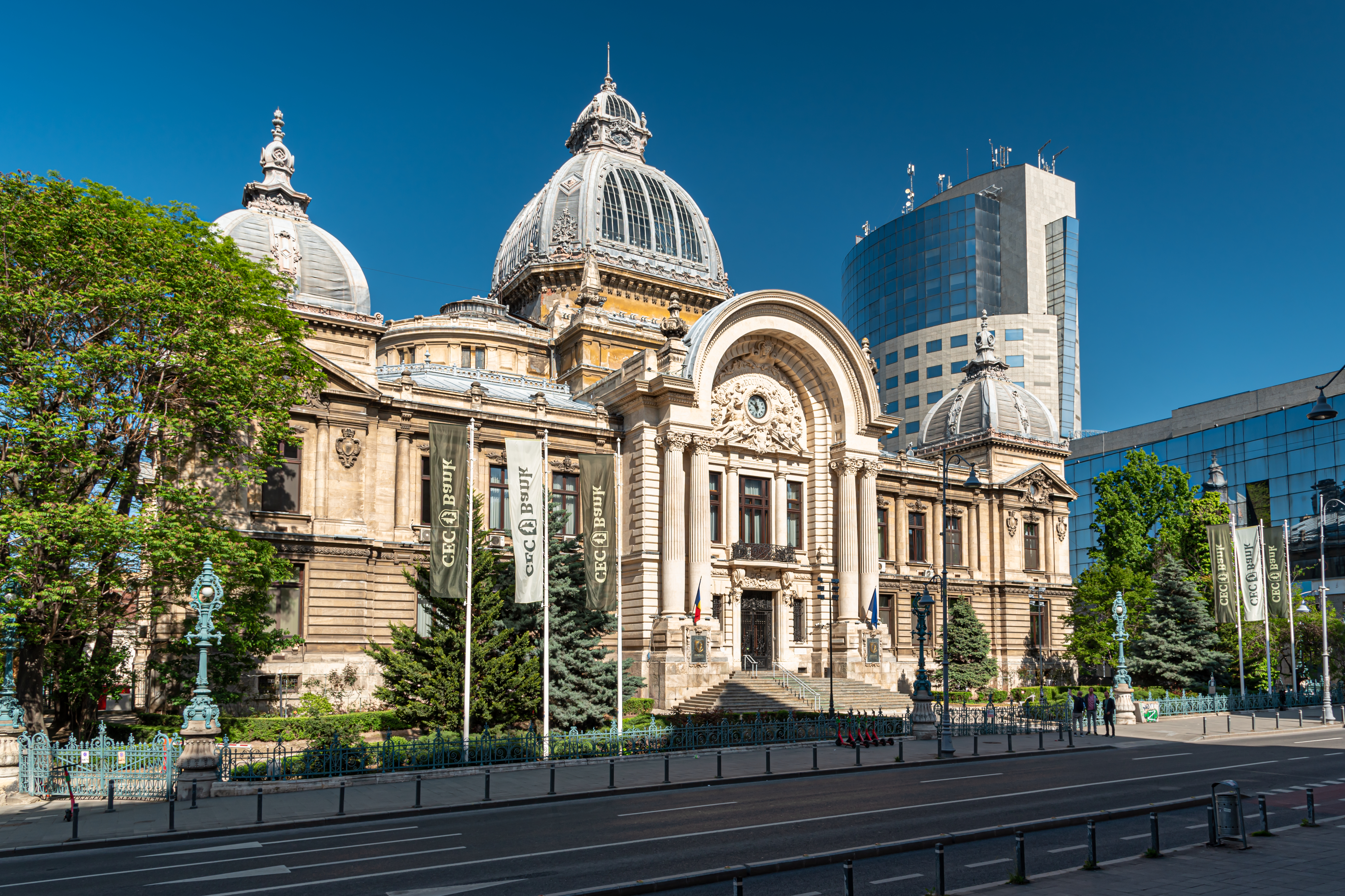
CEC Bank head office, Bucharest

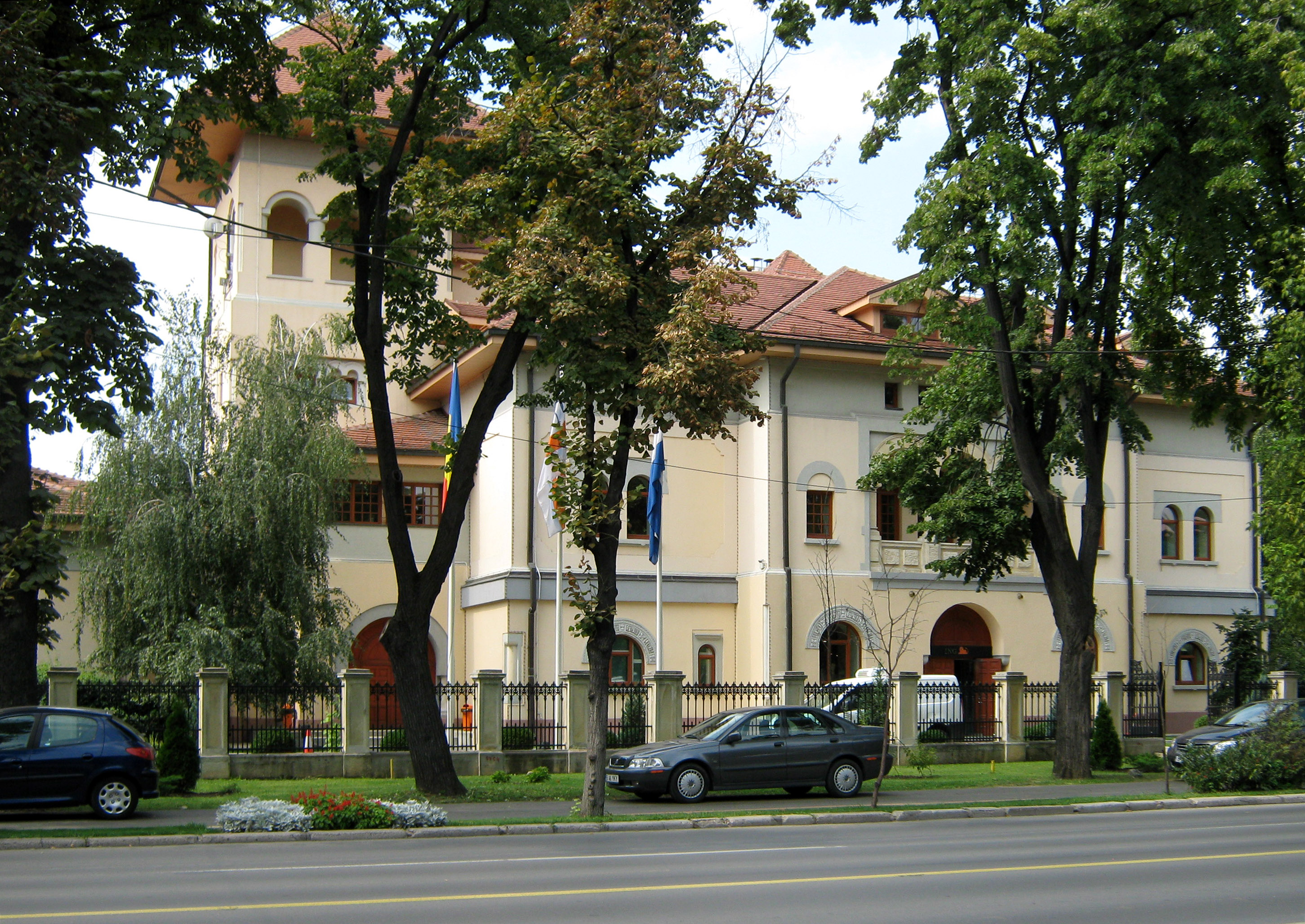
Kiseleff Palace in Bucharest, head office of Exim Banca

The following list of banks in Romania is to be understood within the framework of the European single market, which means that Romania's banking system is more open to cross-border banking operations than peers outside of the European Union.

== Recent developments ==
As of 2026, Romania's banking sector comprises around 29 active banks, with additional institutions undergoing mergers or acquisitions. The sector has experienced gradual consolidation in recent years, reflecting broader structural changes and competitive pressures.

Total banking assets reached approximately 900–915 billion RON (around €180–185 billion) by early 2026, supported by steady credit growth and strong capitalization levels across the system.

== Systemically important banks ==
As of 2025, the following Romanian banks were designated as systemically important, listed here by decreasing score of systemic importance:

- Banca Transilvania SA
- Banca Comercială Română SA, majority-owned by Erste Group (Austria)
- UniCredit Bank SA, subsidiary of UniCredit (Italy)
- BRD - Groupe Societe Generale SA, majority-owned by Société Générale (France)
- Raiffeisen Bank SA, subsidiary of Raiffeisen Bank International (Austria)
- CEC Bank SA, state-owned
- Exim Banca Românească SA, state-owned

== Other commercial banks ==
As of early 2026, the National Bank of Romania listed the additional commercial banks in addition to the above:

- Banca Română de Credite și Investiții
- Banca Comercială Intesa Sanpaolo România SA, subsidiary of Intesa Sanpaolo (Italy)
- Libra Internet Bank SA
- Salt Bank SA, subsidiary of Banca Transilvania
- Vista Bank (Romania) SA, controled by the Vardinogiannis family (Greece)
- Patria Bank SA
- ProCredit Bank SA, subsidiary of ProCredit Bank (Germany)
- Credex Bank SA
- Garanti Bank SA, subsidiary of Banco Bilbao Vizcaya Argentaria (Spain) via Garanti BBVA (Turkey) , sold to Raiffeisen in March 2026
- TechVentures Bank SA

== Cooperative banks ==
The Banca Centrală Cooperatistă Creditcoop acts as the central entity of a cooperative banking group that, as of early 2026, comprised 31 local cooperative banks, respectively headquartered in Arad, Pitești, Onești, Bacău, Marghita, Ștei, Oradea, Bistrița, Botoșani, Codlea, Brașov, Bucharest, Buzău, Călărași, Cluj-Napoca, Sfântu Gheorghe, Târgoviște, Craiova, Târgu Jiu, Deva, Iași, Sighetu Marmației, Baia Mare, Târnăveni, Slatina, Ploiești, Suceava, Tulcea, Râmnicu Vâlcea, Vaslui, and Focșani.

== Development bank ==
The Romanian Investment and Development Bank was established in 2023 and is under the prudential supervision of the National Bank of Romania.

== Romanian branches of international banks ==
As of early 2026, the following banks based in the European Economic Area had branches in Romania:

- (Netherlands) ING
- (France) Banque Banorient, subisidary of BLOM Bank (Lebanon)
- (Republic of Ireland) Citibank Europe, subsidiary of Citigroup (United States)
- (Bulgaria) TBI Bank
- (France) BNP Paribas
- (France) BNP Paribas Personal Finance, subsidiary of BNP Paribas
- (Hungary) Bank of China (Central and Eastern Europe) Ltd, subsidiary of Bank of China
- (Poland) PKO Bank Polski
- (Lithuania) Revolut Bank UAB, subsidiary of Revolut (United Kingdom)
- (Netherlands) Nexent Bank, subsidiary of Fiba Group (Turkey)
- (Germany) Trade Republic

As of October 2025, there were no branches of banks located outside the European Economic Area ("third-country branches") in Romania, based on data compiled by the European Banking Authority.

== Market shares ==
The following table tracks the respective market shares of banks in Romania, in terms of assets (above 1%).

	Bank	2025	2024	2023	2022	2021	2020	2019	2018	2017	2016	2015	2014	2013
1	Banca Transilvania	21.98%^{[j]}	20.90%	20.15%	19.11%	19.55%	18.46%	17.72%	16.48%^{[a]}	13.87%	13.15%	12.60%^{[b]}	9.80%	8.90%
2	Banca Comercială Română	13.81%	13.68%	13.44%	13.95%	13.93%	14.20%	14.43%	15.05%	15.83%	16.28%	15.80%	16.20%	17.50%
3	CEC Bank	11.24%	11.26%	10.41%	8.83%	7.92%	7.37%	6.64%	6.50%	7.41%	7.16%	7.30%	7.70%	7.40%
4	UniCredit Bank	10.76%^{[i]}	8.23%	8.43%	8.62%	7.84%	8.11%	8.99%	9.21%	8.78%	8.30%	8.10%^{[c]}	7.90%	7.60%
5	BRD – Groupe Société Générale	9.97%	9.75%	10.13%	10.20%	10.48%	11.01%	11.28%	11.99%	12.50%	12.87%	13.00%	12.40%	13.00%
6	Raiffeisen Bank	9.26%	9.31%	8.73%	8.85%	9.25%	9.16%	8.66%	8.88%	8.44%	8.49%	8.40%	7.90%	7.30%^{[d]}
7	ING Bank	8.40%	8.85%	8.93%	9.00%	9.27%	9.55%	9.01%	8.51%	7.87%	7.08%	6.30%	5.10%	5.00%
8	Exim Banca Românească	3.07%	3.03%	3.29%	3.28%	2.30%	2.11%^{[g]}	1.57%	1.60%	1.30%	1.09%	1.00%	1.10%	1.10%
9	Garanti BBVA		1.89%	1.90%	1.91%	1.78%	1.91%	2.19%	2.27%	2.33%	2.28%	2.50%	2.20%	2.00%
10	Citibank^{[e]}	1.98%	1.78%	1.77%	2.05%	1.91%	1.98%	2.06%	1.78%	1.57%	1.73%	2.30%	2.40%	1.80%
11	Intesa Sanpaolo	1.55%^{[k]}	0.91%	0.92%	1.09%	1.09%	1.15%	1.33%	1.26%	1.05%^{[f]}	1.04%	1.10%	1.20%	1.40%
12	Libra Internet Bank	1.45%	1.44%	1.39%	1.39%	1.50%	1.31%	1.32%	1.21%	1.08%	0.86%	0.60%	0.50%	0.30%
14	Vista Bank		1.00%	1.18%	1.16%^{[h]}									

Notes
^{a} Banca Transilvania acquired Bancpost in 2018 from Eurobank.
^{b} Banca Transilvania acquired Volksbank Group's Romanian subsidiary in 2015.
^{c} UniCredit Bank acquired Royal Bank of Scotland's Romanian subsidiary in 2015.
^{d} Raiffeisen Bank acquired Citibank's retail banking operations in 2013.
^{e} Citibank sold its retail banking operations to Raiffeisen Bank in 2015, and currently only has corporate banking operations on the local market.
^{f} Intesa Sanpaolo acquired Veneto Banca, including its Romanian subsidiary, in 2017.
^{g} EximBank acquired Banca Românească, a subsidiary of National Bank of Greece, in 2020 and completed the merger in 2022.
^{h} Vista Bank acquired Credit Agricole's Romanian subsidiary in 2021.
^{i} UniCredit acquired Alpha Bank's Romanian subsidiary in 2025 and merged it into UniCredit Bank Romania.
^{j} OTP Bank acquired Millennium BCP's Romanian subsidiary in 2015.
^{k} Intesa Sanpaolo acquired First Bank in 2024 and merged it into its Romanian branch (Intesa Sanpaolo Bank Romania) in 2025.

== Defunct banks ==
- Banca Marmorosch Blank (1848-1948)
- Bank of Romania (1865-1948)
- Banca Albina din Sibiu (1871-1948)
- Banca Agricolă (1872-2002)
- Central Bank for Industry and Commerce (1887-1950)
- Romanian Credit Bank (1888-1950)
- Banca Generală Română (1897-1919)
- Bancorex (1968-1999)
- Anglo Romanian Bank (1973-2011)
- Bankcoop (1990-2000)
- Credit Bank (1990-1996)
- Bancpost (1991-2019)
- Banca Comercială Carpatica (1991-2017)
- Dacia Felix Bank (1991-2000)
- Banca Românească (1992-2023)
- Banca Internațională a Religiilor (1993-2000)
- Credit Europe Bank Romania (1993-2025)
- Columna Bank (1995-1998)
- First Bank (1995-2025)
- OTP Bank Romania (1995-2024)
- RBS Romania (1995-2015)
- Banca Italo Romena (1996-2017)
- Banca Română de Scont (1996-2002)
- Crédit Agricole Bank Romania (1999-2021)
- Volksbank Romania (2000-2015)
- Nova Bank (2002-2006)
- Millennium Bank Romania (2007-2015)
- Alior Bank Romania (2016-2024)

== Additional discontinued operations ==
Bank	Licence withdrawn	Fate	Date
Albina Bank	13 May 1999	Bankruptcy	25 May 1999
Investment and Development Bank	29 March 2002	Dissolved	11 March 2002
Turkish-Romanian Bank	30 April 2002	Bankruptcy	3 July 2002
HVB Bank		Merged with Banca Comerciala Ion Tiriac as HVB Tiriac Bank	31 August 2006
Banca di Roma		The group, including its Romanian branch, merged with Unicredit	12 June 2008
Banca CR Firenze		The group, including its Romanian subsidiary, merged with Intesa Sanpaolo.	1 October 2012
Veneto Banca	8 June 2018	The group, including its Romanian branch, merged with Intesa Sanpaolo.	27 June 2017
Piraeus Bank		The Romanian subsidiary of Piraeus Bank was acquired by J.C. Flowers & Co., whom later changed the bank's name to First Bank on 30 October 2018.	28 June 2018
Bank of Cyprus	1 January 2019	Sold its assets and liabilities to Marfin Bank (now known as Vista Bank) in 2013, and closed in 2018.	31 December 2018
National Bank of Greece		The Romanian subsidiary of National Bank of Greece, Banca Românească, was acquired by the Romanian state-owned corporate bank EximBank.	23 January 2020
Bank Leumi	30 April 2020	Bank Leumi's Romanian subsidiary merged with First Bank.	31 April 2020
Alpha Bank		The Romanian subsidiary of Alpha Bank merged with UniCredit.	18 August 2025

== See also ==
- List of banks in Europe
- List of banks in the euro area
