= Golden Team (disambiguation) =

Golden Team may refer to:

- Golden generation or golden team, an exceptionally gifted group of players of similar age
- Golden Team, the Hungary national football team of the 1950s.
- Romanian Golden Team, a group of former Romanian gymnasts founded in 2006.
- CCA Golden Team
