= UpGround =

Coordinates: 44.479728°N 26.114781°E

- Interactive map of the UpGround area

General information
- Status: Completed
- Location: Bucharest, Romania
- Construction started: 2007
- Opening: 2010
- Cost: €260 million
- Owner: Deutsche Bank

Height
- Roof: 55 m (180 ft)

Technical details
- Floor count: 16
- Floor area: 226,000 square metres (2,430,000 ft^{2})
- Lifts/elevators: 16

UpGround is a condominium located in Bucharest at the intersection of Barbu Văcărescu and Fabrica de Glucoză streets and Şoseaua Petricani. The project consists of four buildings, two residential and two office with a total floor area of 226,000 square metres (2,430,000 ft^{2}). The two residential buildings have 16 floors each and include a number of 600 apartments and have a floor area of 126,000 m^{2} (1,360,000 ft^{2}). The project also includes the seven floor class A office building BOC Tower. The tower has a gross leasable area (GLA) of 57,000 m^{2} (610,000 ft^{2}) making it the largest office building in Romania. The most important tenants are Banca Românească which occupies 15,000 m^{2} (160,000 ft^{2}) and GfK with 2,730 m^{2} (29,400 ft^{2}).

In May 2008 the project was bought by RREEF Real Estate, the real estate branch of Deutsche Bank for €340 million making it the largest real estate transaction in Romania.
