= History of the Steaua București football team =

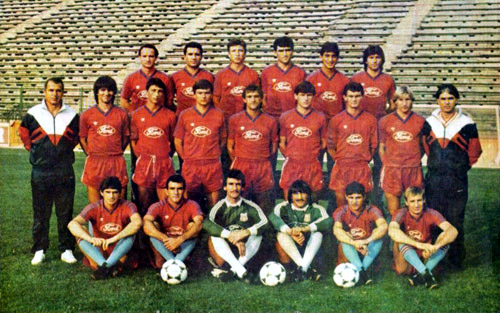
The Steaua București champion team of 1989.

Steaua București is a Romanian professional football club. It is the most successful team in Romania, being the only one from a communist country to have won the European Cup, which it did in 1986.

The original football team was founded in 1947 as ASA București and belonged to the Ministry of National Defence, through the namesake sports club. It quickly became successful, winning the Cupa României (as CSCA București) in 1948–49 and (as CCA București) in 1950, the League and Cup double in 1951 and 1952, and the League four more times between 1953 and 1961. Renamed CSA Steaua București in 1961, the club continued to win trophies. Under manager Ștefan Covaci they won one League title and three Romanian Cups between 1967 and 1971. Altogether, they won the Cup eight times between 1961 and 1979, reaching the quarter-finals of the Cup Winners' Cup in 1972. Steaua's stadium, the 30,000-seater Stadionul Ghencea, was opened in 1974.

Under coaches Emerich Jenei and Anghel Iordănescu, Steaua won the League in 1984–85. As a result they were entered in the 1985–86 European Cup, which they won, beating Barcelona on penalties in the final. A few months later they won the 1986 European Super Cup. They reached the semi-final of the 1987–88 European Cup, and the final of the 1988–89 European Cup.

In 1998, the football team of CSA Steaua București ceased its activity and was replaced by a new team called AFC Steaua București, structured as a non-governmental organization. While AFC Steaua did not own the Steaua brand, it had temporary rights to use it, along with access to the club's facilities, staff, and players.

In the early 2000s, AFC Steaua began borrowing money from Gigi Becali. In exchange for the debts, Becali received federative rights over the players, along with the promise of receiving shares in the future. At the beginning of 2003, Becali established FC Steaua București SA, a joint-stock company in which AFC Steaua was one of the shareholders. This decision was made because Romanian law prohibited an NGO like AFC Steaua from transforming into a joint-stock company. Gigi Becali received 51% of the shares, AFC Steaua held 36%, Viorel Păunescu 6%, Victor Pițurcă 4%, and Lucian Becali 3%. The newly formed club formally requested permission from CSA Steaua to use the Steaua brand, as AFC Steaua had done previously, but their request was denied.

In 2011, CSA Steaua filed a lawsuit against Becali's club, arguing that it had been using the brand illegally since 2004 and seeking to revoke its rights. The Bucharest Tribunal initially rejected this claim on 17 April 2012, and the Court of Appeal upheld the decision on 20 December 2013. However, the High Court of Cassation and Justice later overturned these rulings. On 3 December 2014, the High Court ruled that Becali's club had no legal right to use the Steaua name, colors, or logo. As a result, the team was forced to play its next league match in an all-yellow kit instead of red and blue. On the scoreboard, the team was labeled as "Hosts," and an empty square showed instead of a logo. On 30 March 2017, the club officially changed its name to Fotbal Club FCSB.

In 2017, the Ministry of National Defence reactivated the CSA Steaua București football section and enrolled the team in the 2017-2018 Liga IV season. This decision followed court rulings that recognized CSA Steaua as the rightful owner of the original club's name, logo, and history. As of now, CSA Steaua București competes in Liga II. However, the club is currently ineligible for promotion to Liga I due to Romanian laws prohibiting publicly owned clubs from participating in the Liga Profesionistă de Fotbal competition.

== Foundation and early years (1947–1950) ==
Period	Name
1947–1948	ASA București
1948–1950	CSCA București
1950–1961	CCA București
1961–1998	CSA Steaua București
1998–2003	AFC Steaua București
2017–present	CSA Steaua București

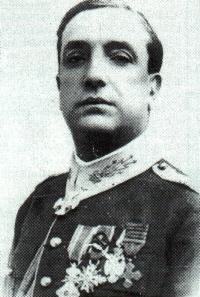
Mihail Lascăr, High Commander of the Romanian Royal Army, that signet the degree for the foundation of Steaua.

On 7 June 1947, at the initiative of several officers of the Romanian Royal House, the first Romanian sports club of the Army was born through a decree signed by General Mihail Lascăr, High Commander of the Romanian Royal Army. The club was to be called ASA București (Asociația Sportivă a Armatei București – English: Army Sports Association), with seven different sections (football, fencing, volleyball, boxing, shooting, athletics, tennis), and its leadership was entrusted to General-Major Oreste Alexandrescu. The decision had been adopted on the ground that several officers were already playing for different teams, which was premise to a good nucleus for forming a future competitive team. With this squad, Coloman Braun-Bogdan, the first coach in the club's history, went to a sustained training camp in the mountain resort of Sinaia. Although shirts, boots and balls were missing, atmosphere inside the team was rather optimistic.

Thanks to sustained efforts, in the shortest time possible, the club soon acquired the first training suits, navy green, duck material of, and the first shirts, blue. The big surprise, however, were the 40 pairs of boots the club had purchased for the 20 selected players.

With a squad gathered in record time, ASA was preparing itself for the Romanian second league promotion play-offs. However, the new Communist government that had come to power in 1945 and assumed total control of the country at the end of 1947 stated that every sports association in the country was now to be linked to a certain trade union, be it a State Department, a Ministry or a company. However, this was not the case for first league club, Carmen București, owned by wealthy industrialist Dumitru Mociorniță, who saw his team excluded from the championship and later on dissolved, its place in the 1st league being now taken by newly formed ASA.

The team's first official competition was the 1947–48 Romanian Football Championship season, in which they finished 14th. Their first official match was played in Bucharest against Dermata Cluj and ended 0–0. The team managed to avoid relegation after a play-out with seven other teams.

On 5 June 1948, by Order 289 of the Ministry of National Defence, ASA became CSCA (Clubul Sportiv Central al Armatei – English: Central Sports Club of the Army), after which performances began to roll.

In 1949, CSCA won its first trophy in history, the Romanian Cup, after defeating CSU Cluj 2–1 in the final. Because of the championship's switch to a Soviet-inspired spring-fall system, which lasted from 1950 to 1956, CSCA played that fall in an unofficial competition called "The Autumn Cup", held in six different groups, without a final tournament, winning one of them.

== The CCA Golden Team (1950–1957) ==
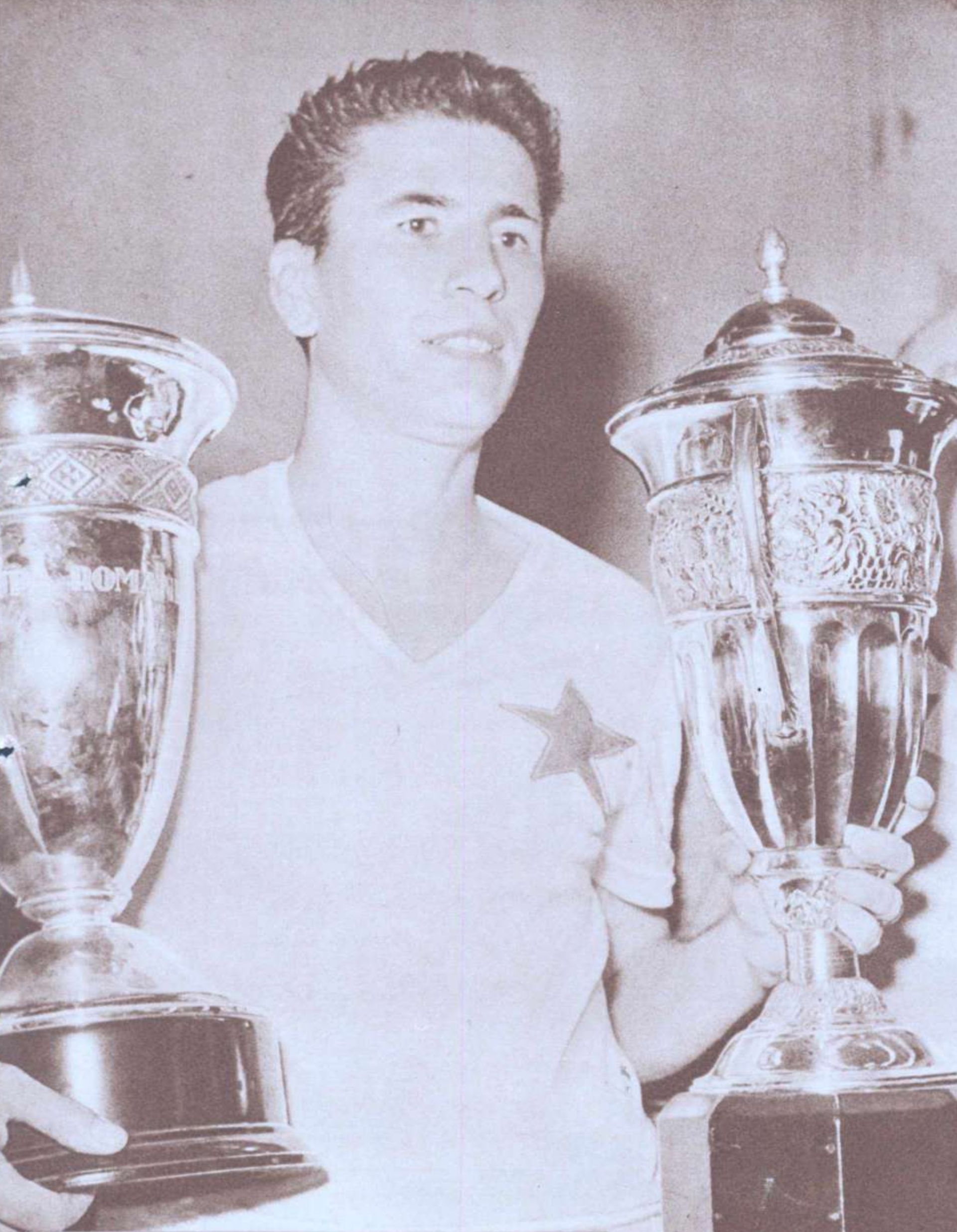
Club legend and former coach Gheorghe Constantin

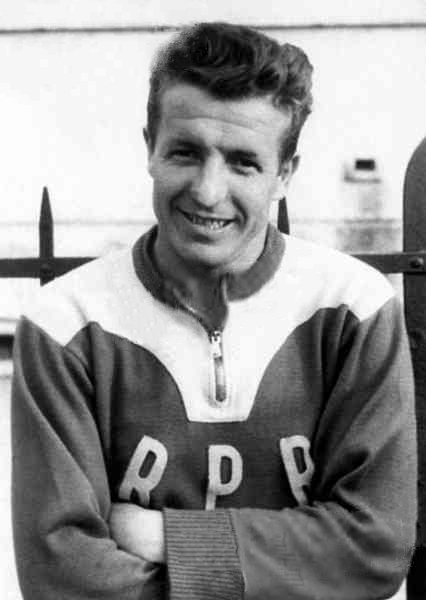
Alexandru Apolzan

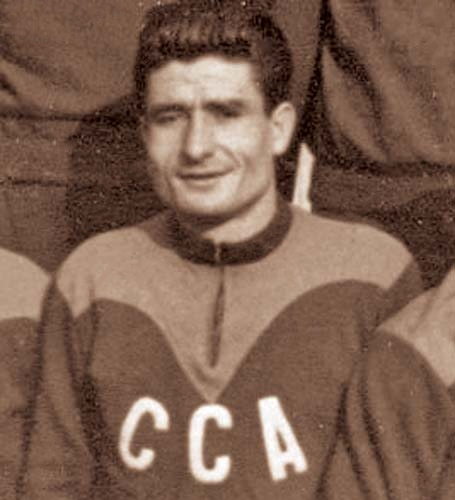
Ion Voinescu

In March 1950, CSCA changed its name to CCA (Casa Centrală a Armatei, English: "Central House of the Army").

Under the new name, the club would enter the high-life of Romanian football by winning their first Championship-Cup Double in 1951, just shortly after conquering their second national cup one year earlier after trailing 3–1 past Flamura Roșie Arad. The first title was achieved on goal average (which was then used as a second criterion instead of goal difference), while the cup by disposing 3–1 of Flacăra Mediaș in the final. Two subsequent titles followed consecutively after that year and another one in 1956. The team also won the Romanian Cup in 1952 (2–0 v Flacăra Ploiești) and 1955 (6–3 v Progresul Oradea).

The 1950s were years of great domestic performances, ones in which the famous "CCA Golden Team" crystallized itself, a team which sometimes confused itself with the Romania national team itself, with players such as goalkeeper Ion Voinescu, defenders Vasile Zavoda and Alexandru Apolzan, midfielders Ștefan Onisie and Tiberiu Bone or strikers Gheorghe Cacoveanu, Gheorghe Constantin, Ion Alecsandrescu, Francisc Zavoda, Iosif Petschovsky and Nicolae Tătaru directed by Technical Consultant Virgil Economu and coaches Ilie Savu and Ștefan Dobay. 1956 was one of CCA's most prestigious years, when, apart from winning the title, the team enterprised a tournament in England, where they defeated Luton Town 4–3 (which they had already defeated 5–1 in a friendly in Bucharest one year earlier), drew against Arsenal 1–1 and Sheffield Wednesday 3–3 and lost 5–0 in front of Wolverhampton Wanderers. Also, on 22 April 1956, the Romania national team beat Yugoslavia 1–0 in Belgrade with a team comprised only by CCA players.

1957 was the year Romania switched back to the fall-spring system and in whose spring CCA took part in the Danube Cup (former Mitropa Cup), being knocked out by MTK Budapest in the first round. That year, the team also made their first European Cup appearance, being eliminated by Borussia Dortmund in the European Champions Cup after a third match play-off in Bologna.

== A new "Star" (1957–1985) ==
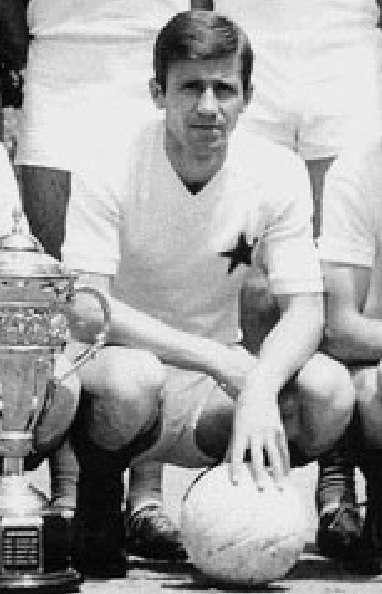
Florea Voinea

In 1961, after having won the previous two national titles, CCA changed names once again (for the final time) to CSA Steaua București (Clubul Sportiv al Armatei Steaua – English: Army Sports Club Steaua). The name Steaua is Romanian for The Star and was adopted because of the presence, just like in any other Eastern-European Army team, of a red star (turned yellow now, to symbolize Romania's tri-colour red, yellow and blue flag) on their badge.

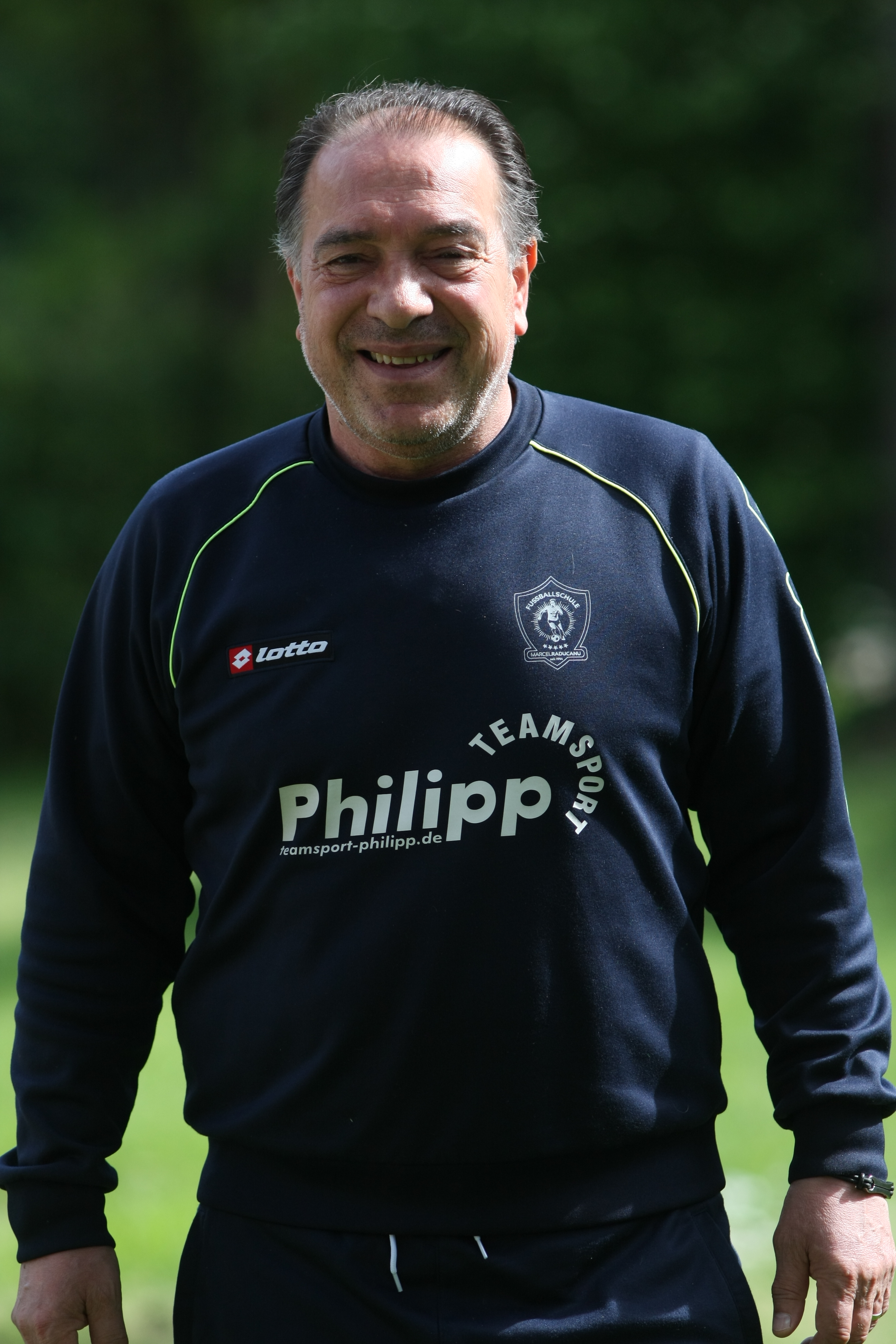
Marcel Răducanu wore the Steaua jersey 229 times.

In the late 1960s, Ștefan Covaci was hired as manager of the club. During his first season in charge, he won the Romanian League in 1967–68 and three national cups in 1969, 1970 and 1971, before leaving to coach Johan Cruyff's Ajax in 1971.

In 1972, Steaua reached the quarter-finals of the European Cup Winners' Cup, defeating Barcelona, but lost against Franz Beckenbauer's Bayern Munich 1–1 on away goals.

On 9 April 1974, Steaua's home, Stadionul Ghencea, was inaugurated with a friendly match opposing OFK Beograd which ended 2–2. The arena was something new for post-War Romania, as it was built especially for football, with a capacity of 30,000 and with no athletics track. Up to that date, Steaua had played its home matches on either two of Bucharest's largest stadiums, Republicii and 23 August.

Internally, fierce rivalry with teams like Dinamo București, Petrolul Ploiești and UTA Arad made it more and more difficult for the military team to reach the title, the 1970s and 1980s seeing them win the title only three times under their new name (1967–68, 1975–76, 1977–78). However, during that same period, Steaua won eight National Cups (1961–62, 1965–66, 1966–67, 1968–69, 1969–70, 1970–71, 1975–76 and 1978–79), ultimately being nicknamed the cup specialists.

The first half of the 1980s was a very poor period for the club, as no trophies were won for six years. However, several prodigies were transferred, such as Helmut Duckadam, Ștefan Iovan, Miodrag Belodedici, Marius Lăcătuș, Victor Pițurcă, Mihail Majearu, Gavril Balint and Adrian Bumbescu, who would set the basis for the future team. However, these years of search and frustration did no less than to foretell the amazing performances of the 1980s and 1990s.

== Champions of Europe (1985–1989) ==
=== Jenei's Steaua side ===
==== 1985–86 season ====
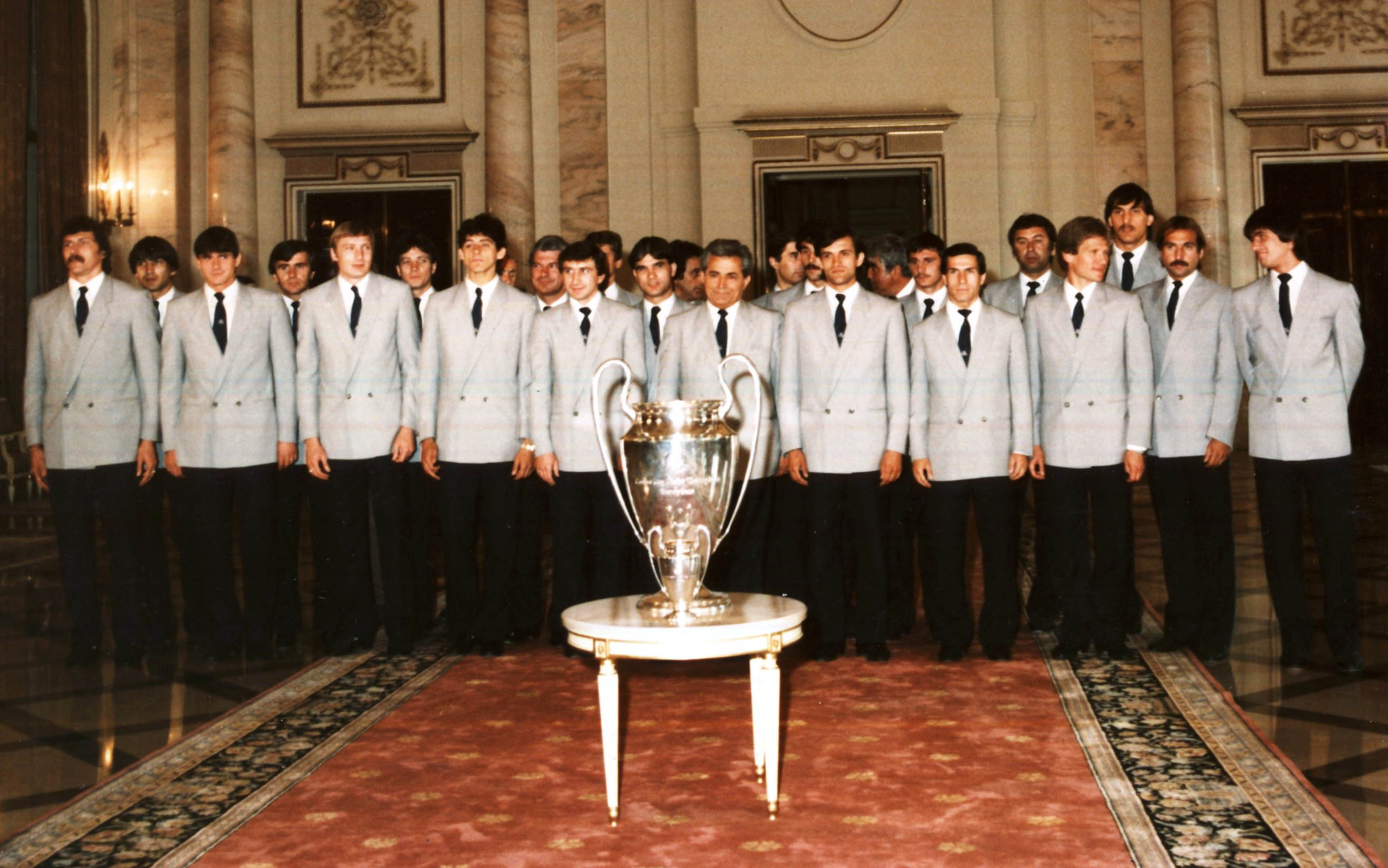
Steaua București squad with the UEFA European Champions Clubs' Cup in 1986.

Under coaches Emerich Jenei and Anghel Iordănescu, Steaua București won the national championship in the 1984–85 season, ending a six-year title drought. In the following European Cup campaign, the team eliminated Vejle BK, Budapest Honvéd FC, FC Kuusysi and R.S.C. Anderlecht, becoming the first Romanian club to reach the final of the competition. The final was held on 7 May 1986 at the Ramón Sánchez Pizjuán Stadium in Seville, where Spanish champions FC Barcelona were widely regarded as favourites. After a goalless draw, goalkeeper Helmut Duckadam saved all four penalties he faced, a feat later recognised in the Guinness Book of Records, while Gavril Balint and Marius Lăcătuș scored their attempts, securing Steaua’s victory and making them the first Eastern European team to win the competition.

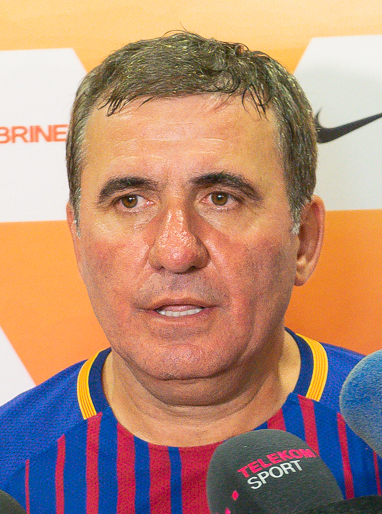
Gheorghe Hagi scored the winning goal in the European Super Cup against Dynamo Kyiv in 1987.

==== 1986–87 season ====
Gheorghe Hagi, Romanian all-time best footballer, joined the club a few months later, scoring the only goal of the match against Dynamo Kyiv which brought Steaua an additional European Super Cup on 24 February 1987 in Monaco, just two months after having lost the Intercontinental Cup 1–0 to Argentinians River Plate in Tokyo. However, that match was marred with a questionable decision by referee José Martínez when he disallowed a clear goal scored by Miodrag Belodedici.

==== 1988–89 season ====
Surprisingly for those who thought of these performances as an isolated phenomenon, Steaua remained at the top of European football for the rest of the decade, managing one more European Cup semi-final against Benfica (1987–88) and one more European Cup final in 1989, which was lost 4–0 in front of Marco van Basten, Ruud Gullit and Frank Rijkaard's Milan. This happened next to their four additional national titles (1985–86, 1986–87, 1987–88, 1988–89) and four national cups (1984–85, 1986–87, 1987–88, 1988–89). In addition, from June 1986 to September 1989, Steaua ran a record 104-match undefeated streak in the championship, setting a world record for that time and a European one still standing.

During these last years of the Communist regime in Romania, dictator Nicolae Ceaușescu's son Valentin was involved in the life of the team. Valentin Ceaușescu admitted in a recent interview that he had done nothing else than to protect his favourite team from Dinamo's sphere of influence, ensured by the Ministry of Internal Affairs. Though contested by some, their five-year winning streak in the championship between 1984–85 and 1988–89 corroborates the notion that the team was really the best during this period.

== Post-Revolution era (1990–2002) ==
The Romanian Revolution led the country towards a free open market and, subsequently, several players of the great 1980s team left for other clubs in the West. Gheorghe Hagi left for Real Madrid for a record $4.3 million transfer fee which stands up to this day for the national championship, Marius Lăcătuș to Fiorentina, Dan Petrescu to Foggia, Silviu Lung to Logroñés, Ștefan Iovan to Brighton & Hove Albion, Tudorel Stoica to Lens, among other departures.

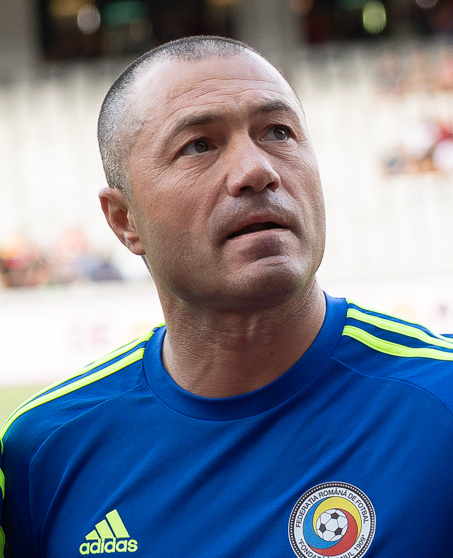
Adrian Ilie joined the club in 1993, winning six domestic titles

Therefore, three years followed in which the club won only a national cup in the 1991–92 season. However, a swift recovery followed and Steaua managed a six consecutive championship streak between 1992–93 and 1997–98 to equalize the 1920s performance of Chinezul Timișoara and also three more cups in 1995–96, 1996–97 and 1998–99. Other records highly regarded by the fans were the eight-year and six-month long undefeated streak in front of arch-rivals Dinamo București, which counted 19 matches in both the championship and the Romanian Cup, and the 17-year and 7-month long undefeated league run at Ghencea against the same Dinamo.

At international level, the club managed to reach the Cup Winners' Cup quarter-finals in 1993, when they lost on away goals to Royal Antwerp, and also to make it to the Champions League group stage three years in a row between 1994–95 and 1996–97.

In 1998, following lobbying from the football department president, Marcel Pușcaș, and new LPF regulations, the football section ended its activity and was replaced by a new team, AFC Steaua Bucuresti, structured as an NGO, with Romanian businessman Viorel Păunescu serving as president. At that time, the Minister of National Defence, Victor Babiuc, granted the NGO the temporary right to use the Steaua brand name and the Steaua Stadium, as well as Steaua's place in the Romanian first division, and its entire staff.

== Successors ==
=== FCSB ===
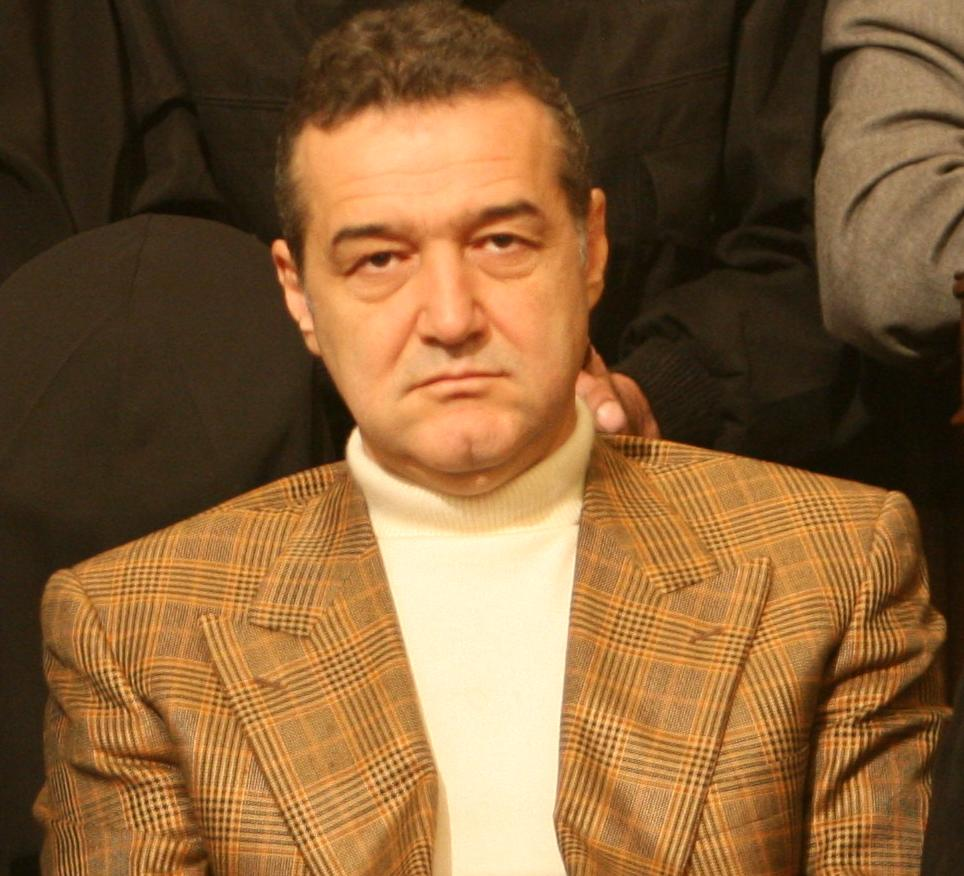
Gigi Becali, the controversial owner of FCSB since 2003.

Viorel Păunescu performed poorly as a president and soon the club was plunged into debt. Despite the title won in 2000–01, George "Gigi" Becali, another businessman, was offered the position of vice-president, in hope that he would invest money in the club. In January 2003, during the 2002-2003 Divizia A season, Becali established FC Steaua București SA, a joint-stock company, which replaced AFC Steaua. This decision was made because the law prohibited AFC Steaua, as an NGO, from transforming into a joint-stock company. In the newly created club Gigi Becali received 51% of the shares, AFC Steaua held 36%, Viorel Păunescu 6%, Victor Pițurcă 4%, and Lucian Becali 3%. The total value of the shares at that time was estimated at 10 million dollars. Following this, FC Steaua Bucuresti SA formally requested permission from CSA Steaua to use the Steaua brand, similar to what AFC Steaua had done, but their request was denied.

In the summer of 2004, following a third consecutive year with no trophy won, former Italian glory Walter Zenga was appointed as head coach, becoming the first ever foreign Steaua manager. Following the appointment, results came immediately, as the team qualified for the UEFA Cup group stage and further on became the first Romanian team to make it to the European football spring since 1993 (also Steaua's performance), where they outpassed holders Valencia after a penalty shoot-out at Ghencea. Zenga was sacked with three matchdays to play in the Divizia A, but Steaua eventually won the title, performance repeated the following year, when, under coaches Oleh Protasov (August – December) and Cosmin Olăroiu (March 2006 – May 2007), they also managed to make it to the UEFA Cup semi-finals (knocked out dramatically by Middlesbrough's late goal in the 89th minute after having eliminated local rivals Rapid București in an all-Romanian quarter-final) and to win the Romanian Supercup (1–0 against the same Rapid București in July 2006), the latter being the club's 50th trophy in its 59-year history.

In the next season, after having successfully passed two qualifying rounds against Gorica and Standard Liège, Steaua reached the group stage of the 2006–07 UEFA Champions League, where they ended third in Group E, behind Lyon (0–3 home, 1–1 away) and Real Madrid (1–4 home, 0–1 away) and in front of Dynamo Kyiv (1–1 home, 4–1 away). However, their continuation in the UEFA Cup was short, having been outpassed by holders Sevilla in the round of 32.

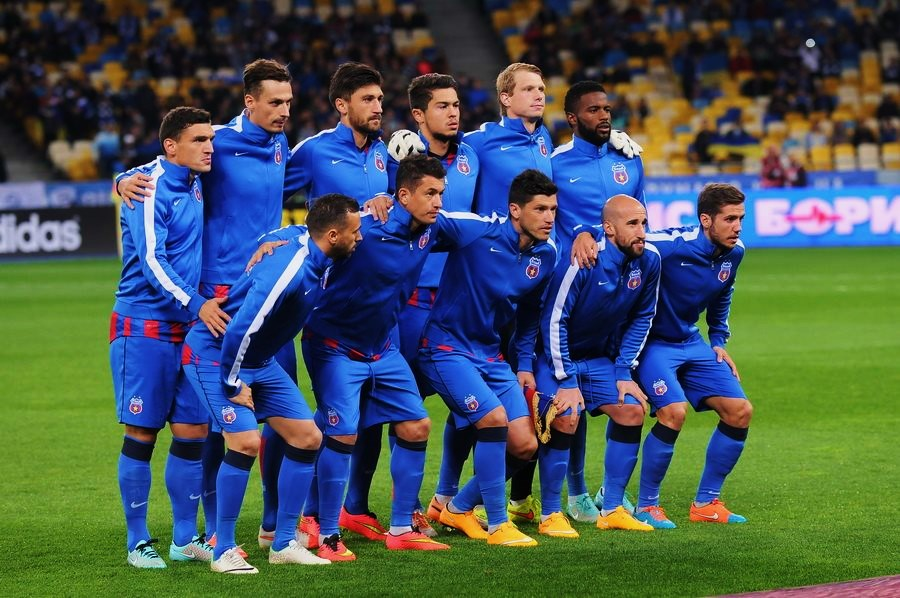
FCSB players lining up before a UEFA Europa League match in 2014. The team was still named FC Steaua București at that time.

Internally, even though ranked second during the winter break, they lost contact with leader Dinamo București, who built a massive point advance in front to win the title. Steaua still entered the second Champions League qualifying round as league runners-up. Steaua also qualified for the semi-finals of the Romanian Cup, a trophy not seen at Ghencea since 1999, where they were defeated by Politehnica Timișoara. In the Champions League, they passed Zagłębie Lubin (1–0 away and 2–1 home) and BATE Borisov (2–2 away and 2–0 home), and reached the group stage, where they played against Arsenal, Sevilla, and Sparta Prague. However, their performance was sub-par, finishing last with one point.

The 2008–09 Champions League season saw them advance to the group stage after defeating Galatasaray (2–2 away and 1–0 home), only to finish again last with one point, after Bayern Munich, Lyon and Fiorentina. Between 2006 and 2011, €45.1 million were invested in transfers. Steaua Bucharest in the 2009–10 season, the team had a poor result followed by a catastrophic 2010–11 season in which the team finished in 5th place but still managed to win the Romanian Cup, in this season 6 coaches were changed. The 2011–12 season was a season in which things became clearer, the star managing to finish in the top 3 of the championship and reach the European spring in the Europa League.

In 2012, due to the departure of Mihai Stoichita from the club, coach Laurentiu Reghecampf was brought in, who stayed at the football rebirth of the star, he brought his staff with whom he had to do one of the last football performances of Romanian clubs. At first, the star fans were not happy with Reghecampf, but he calmed down by bringing them close to the Quarter-finals of the Europa League and won the championship, 16 points from the second place.

2013–14 season it would become a special one due to the victories with Legia Warsaw managing to be the last club from Romania qualified in the UEFA Champion League, the red and blues had an excessive group with Chelsea Schalke and Basel but they did not manage to pass it. They won the second consecutive championship, 5 points from second place, after a season full of victories.

After that Laurentiu Reghecampf left the club for Arabian club Al-Hilal that make the club selected Costel Galca for being the next manager of Steaua being anointed by the club with a special treatment. Costel Galca failed to make a second row champion league appearance, losing in the playoff of the competition after penalty being save by Romanian Cosmin Moti

=== Identity problems (2015–present) ===
In 2011 the Ministry of National Defense sued FC Steaua București SA, claiming that the Romanian Army were the rightful owners of the Steaua logo, colours, honours and name. The 2014–2015 season signaled the start of the most significant identity crisis for the club. On 3 December 2014, the High Court ruled that Becali's club had no right to use the Steaua name, colors, or logo. Consequently, the team was forced to play their next league game in an all-yellow strip instead of their usual red and blue. In place of their name, the scoreboard displayed Hosts and the space for the logo showed an empty square. Following more judiciary sentences, on 30 March 2017, the Romanian Football Federation approved an application to modify the name of the club from SC Fotbal Club Steaua București SA to SC Fotbal Club FCSB SA. CSA Steaua București had previously announced they would refound their football department in the summer of the same year. However, owner Becali announced that his team would retain the original honours and UEFA coefficient, and was also hopeful of recovering the name in the near future. On 23 October 2023 the Bucharest Court of Appeal definitively ruled that CSA Steaua retains its records for the period between 1947 and 1998. The court also rejected the Army club's claim for the period between 1998 and 2003, which remains with the now defunct AFC Steaua, Viorel Păunescu's organization. In the same case, Gigi Becali's lawyers submitted a related request for sporting rights to the records from 2003 to 2017, which was also denied.

Between 2016 and 2019, FCSB finished each time as runners-up in the league, thus becoming the first club in Romania to do so for four consecutive years. In the 2017–18 season under the command of Nicolae Dica, it represented the last glimmer of FCSB by passing the Europa League group, facing Lazio, winning the first match but being destroyed by a 5–1 in the second leg. After Dica's departure, nine coaches followed who did not succeed in qualifying for the European competition or winning the championship. On 26 July 2022, Nicolae Dica returned to FCSB managing to qualify the team in the UEFA Europa Conference League but having a macabre season losing twice 5–0 to Silkeborg.

=== CSA Steaua București ===
CSA Steaua București reactivated its football section and enrolled in the 2017–18 Liga IV season, the fourth tier of the Romanian football pyramid. The team's objective was to advance to a higher league each year, aiming to reach Liga I, a goal that coincided with the opening of the new Steaua Stadium. In April 2018, Steaua București played a home league fixture against AS Academia Rapid București, the principal 'phoenix club' established by supporters of the defunct FC Rapid București. Due to the high profile of the participants, the match was moved to the Arena Națională and attracted a crowd of 36,277, setting a lower-league national record; Rapid București won 3–1 to consolidate their position at the top of the table, with Steaua five points behind in second place.

The team reached the promotion play-offs in their first two seasons but lost each time. Steaua finally achieved promotion at the end of the 2019–20 Liga IV season. They spent only one season in Liga III, as they managed to secure promotion in the play-offs. Steaua currently plays in the second division from where it cannot promote due to the National Sports Law passed in 2000.

== Shirt sponsors and manufacturers ==
Period	Kit manufacturer	Shirt sponsor
1947–1976	None	None
1976–1988	(Germany) Adidas	None
1988–1990	(Germany) Adidas	(United States) Ford
1990–1991	(Germany) Adidas	(United Kingdom) Castrol
1991–1994	(Germany) Adidas	(Netherlands) Philips
1994	(Germany) Adidas	(United States) CBS
1995	(Germany) Adidas	(Romania) BRCE
1996–1997	(Germany) Adidas	(Romania) Bancorex
1997–1999	(Germany) Adidas	(Romania) Dialog
2000–2002	(Germany) Adidas	(Romania) BCR
2017–2018	(Spain) Joma	(Romania) BetArena
2018–2019	(Spain) Joma / (Germany) Jako	(Romania) GoBet^{1}
2019–2021	(Spain) Joma	None
2021^{2}	(Spain) Joma	(Romania) Get's Bet, (Austria) Porotherm (Wienerberger) & (Romania) International Alexander Holding
2021–2024	(Germany) Adidas	(Romania) Get's Bet, (Austria) Porotherm (Wienerberger) & (Romania) International Alexander Holding
2024–present	(Germany) Adidas	(Romania) Stanleybet

1. Partner of Superbet
2. Just for a few matches (pre-season friendlies, 1 cup match and the first 4 league games of the 2021-22 season)
