= Raiffeisen Bank (Romania) =

Universal bank in Romania

- Type: Subsidiary
- Industry: Finance
- Founded: 1998
- Headquarters: Bucharest, Romania
- Area served: Romania
- Products: Financial Services, Retail Banking
- Number of employees: 4,858 (2023)
- Parent: Raiffeisen Bank International
- Website: www.raiffeisen.ro

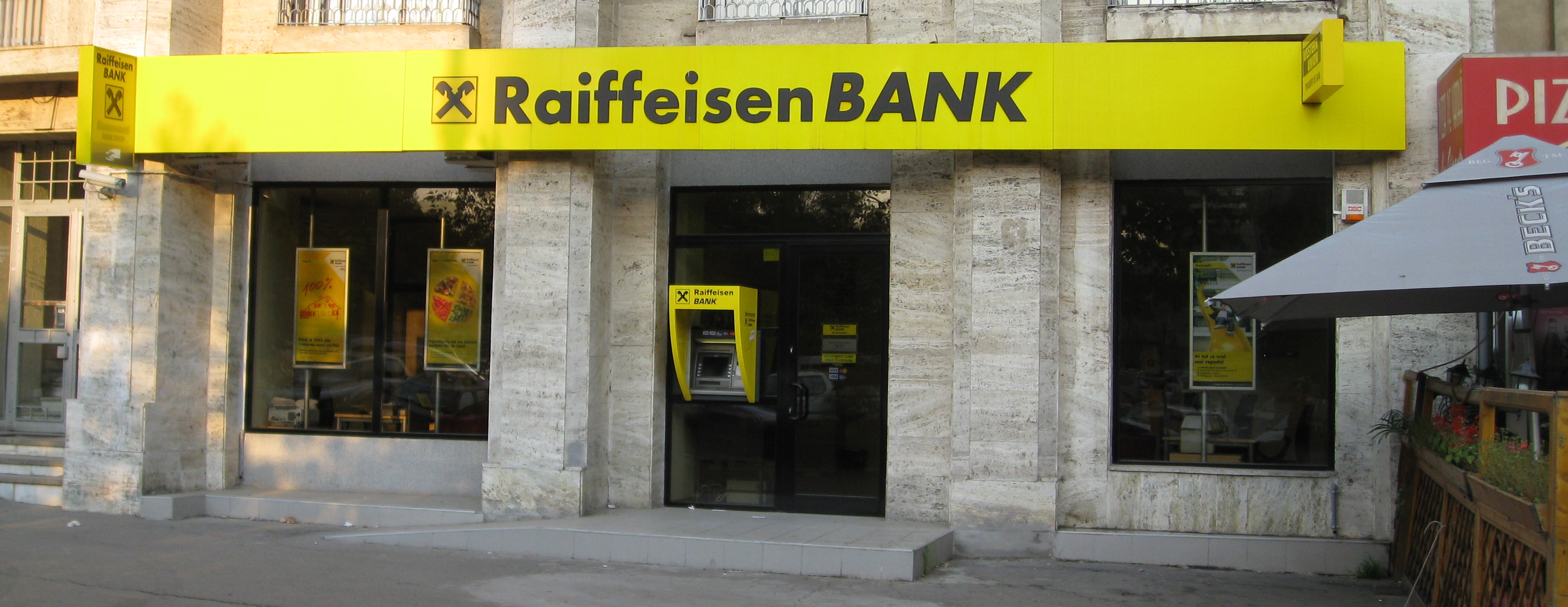
Raiffeisen branch in Bucharest

Raiffeisen Bank is a commercial bank in Romanian. A subsidiary of Raiffeisen Bank International, it provides retail, corporate, and investment banking services in the country.

== History ==
Raiffeisen Bank Romania was formed in June 2002 following the merger of two Raiffeisen Group entities present in the local market: Raiffeisenbank (Romania) S.A., established in 1998 as a subsidiary of RZB Austria, and Banca Agricola Raiffeisen S.A., established in April 2001 after the acquisition and privatization of the state-owned Banca Agricolă by RZB Austria.

On March 20, 2013, the bank acquired the retail credit portfolio of Citibank Romania.

In March 2026, Raiffeisen Bank reached an agreement to acquire Garanti Bank Romania, the Romanian subsidiary of Banco Bilbao Vizcaya Argentaria (BBVA), for €591 million to further expand its operational presence in the country.

== See also ==
- List of banks in Romania
- Banking in Romania
