= UniCredit Bank Romania =

Romanian bank of the UniCredit group

UniCredit Bank
- Company type: Private
- Founded: 1991 - Ion Țiriac Bank
- Headquarters: Bucharest, Romania
- Key people: Pasquale Giamboi, President of the Supervisory Board; Mihaela Lupu, CEO
- Products: Commercial banking, Investment banking, Private banking, Asset management
- Revenue: ▲1.52 billion RON (31 December 2015)
- Net income: ▲269.5 million RON (31 December 2015)
- Total assets: 34.6 billion RON (31 December 2015)
- Number of employees: ▲2.929 (2016)
- Website: www.unicredit.ro

UniCredit Bank is a Romanian bank and member of UniCredit Group. It has a network of 8,500 branches in 17 European countries, and a presence in another 50 international markets.

Being one of the top 5 banks on the Romanian market, UniCredit Bank has 208 branches and almost 3,000 employees. At the end of 2015, the bank had total assets in amount of 34,6 billion RON and included approximately 600,000 active customers.

Among the offered services are: financial solutions for individuals, SMEs, companies and freelancers. UniCredit Bank is recognized for specializing in the real estate market and is the only bank with a dedicated real estate department. In addition, the bank offers cross border solutions, through which the bank manages the customer’s banking relations in multiple countries, ensuring that they receive the same quality of service as in their country. In 2012 and 2013, the prestigious Euromoney magazine awarded UniCredit Bank Award “Best Bank for Cash Management in Romania. Also, UniCredit Bank is recognized for their services to Online Banking in 2009 and recorded the highest value of transactions in Romania by Online Banking. In October 2012, UniCredit Bank launched Mobile Banking [sic] application that allows customers to access banking services at any time, with minimum effort and securely, available with a mobile phone with Internet access. Thus, UniCredit Bank is among the banks in Romania to implement mobile Banking service for phones or tablets such as the iPhone, iPad, BlackBerry, Nokia, Samsung, HTC, LG, or Motorola.

UniCredit Bank launched in March 2012 the first virtual branch on Facebook from Romania, where customers can chat live via a secure connection with the bank’s consultants. Also, e-branch provides access to Online Banking and Business Net which offer the possibility to download brochures about UniCredit Bank services and programs, for individuals or legal entities, to verify the map, to locate the nearest branch or ATM BNA network, or exchange rate, updated in real time.

== History ==
Ion Țiriac Bank was founded in 1991, and then in June 2005 it merged with HVB Bank Romania. In the merger moment in 2005, Ion Țiriac Bank has a network of 60 units, total assets of 706 million (31 March 2005) and a market share of 2.9%, which ranks 11th in the banking system in Romania. Meanwhile, HVB Bank Romania is ranked in the top seven banks in the local market, with total assets of around 1.4 billion euros with 320 employees in 12 branches and nearly 32,000 customers. In 2008, UniCredit Bank acquired subsidiary Banca di Roma in Romania as part of a larger merger, through which UniCredit took Capitalia banking group who held also Banca di Roma. Banca di Roma, Bucharest Branch, had assets of £165.3 million at the end of 2005.

In August 2013, UniCredit Bank and RBD Romania announced the completion of the legal transfer of the Retail and Royal Preferred Banking Business of RBS (Bank) Romania S.A. towards UniCredit Bank S.A. and UniCredit Consumer Financing IFN S.A.. Included in this transfer were the personal use credits, the mortgage credits for property investments, the credit cards, the current accounts and the products and services related to the deposits, the economy accounts, the debit cards, the overdraft accounts and the iBanking service.

UniCredit Țiriac changed its name to Unicredit Bank starting August 2015 following the acquisition by Unicredit Bank Austria AG of shares representing 45 pct of UniCredit Țiriac Bank S.A owned by Țiriac Holdings Ltd.

== Shareholders ==
- 95.62% UniCredit Bank Austria AG
- 4.38% Others

== See also ==
- List of banks in Romania
