= Patria Bank =

Patria Bank S.A.
- Company type: Public
- Traded as: BVB: PBK
- ISIN: ROBACRACNOR6
- Industry: Banking, Financial services
- Founded: 1999; 27 years ago as Banca Comercială Carpatica; 1 May 2017; 8 years ago as Patria Bank (current)
- Headquarters: Bucharest, Romania
- Key people: Horia Manda (Chairman); Bogdan Merfea (CEO)
- Total assets: EUR 0.942 billion (30 June 2025)
- Owner: EEAF Financial Services BV (84%)
- Number of employees: 860 (2017)
- Website: patriabank.ro

Patria Bank S.A. is a Romanian bank based in Bucharest, resulting from the 2017 reverse merger between Banca Comercială Carpatica and Patria Bank (known as Nextebank until 2016), which saw the latter being absorbed into the former, with its name and brand being adopted by the restructured company.

== See also ==
- List of banks in Romania
