= CEC Palace =

Heritage site in Bucharest, Romania

CEC Palace Palatul CEC
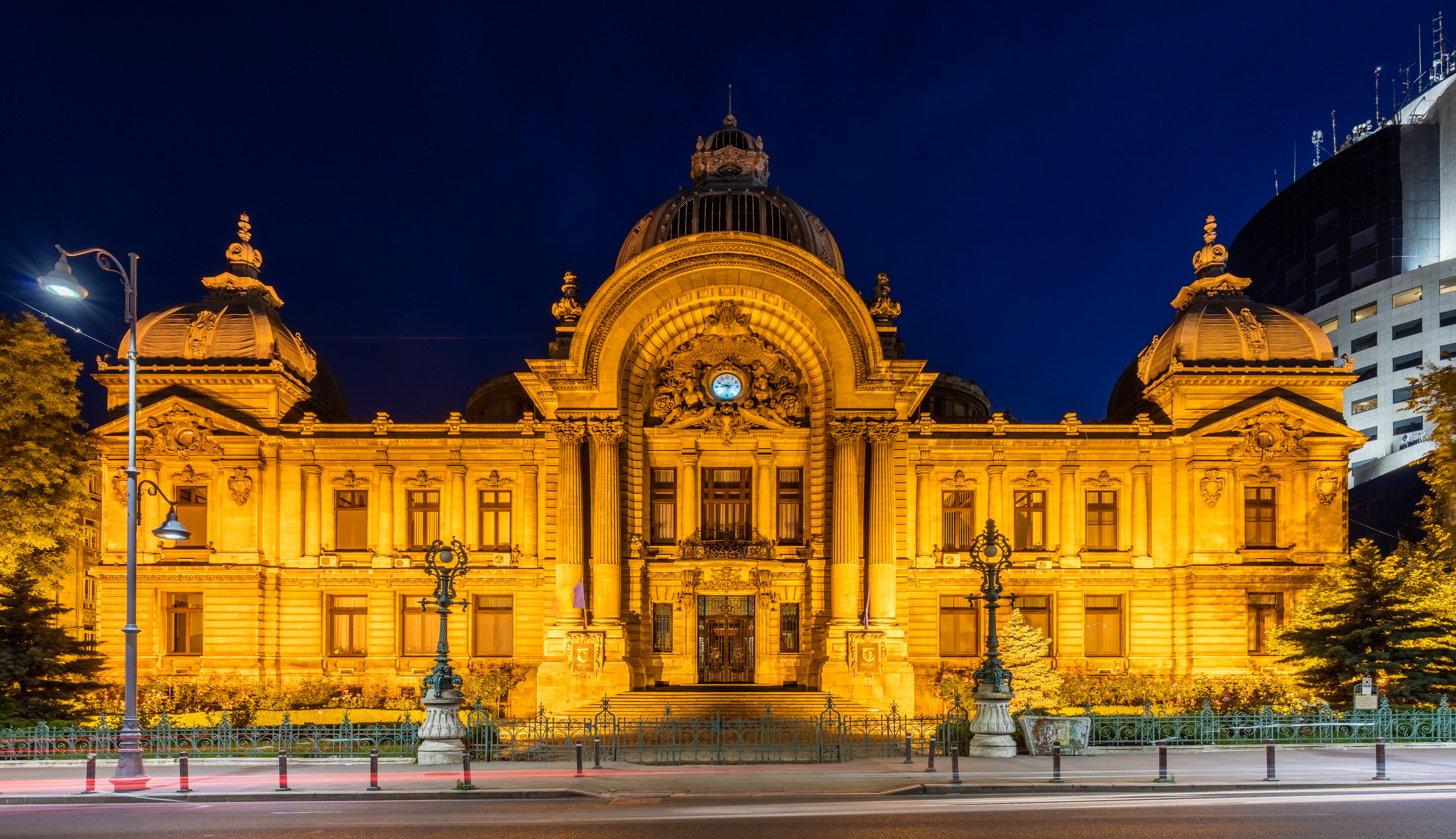
- The CEC Palace in May 2016
- Interactive map of the CEC Palace; Palatul CEC area

General information
- Architectural style: Beaux-Arts
- Location: Bucharest, Romania
- Coordinates: 44.4320°N 26.0965°E
- Construction started: 8 June 1897
- Completed: 1900
- Cost: 30.0 million lei
- Client: CEC Bank

Design and construction
- Architects: Paul Gottereau (project), Ion Socolescu (construction)

The CEC Palace (Romanian: Palatul CEC) in Bucharest, Romania, built between 8 June 1897 and 1900, and situated on Calea Victoriei opposite the National Museum of Romanian History, is the headquarters of CEC Bank.

== History ==
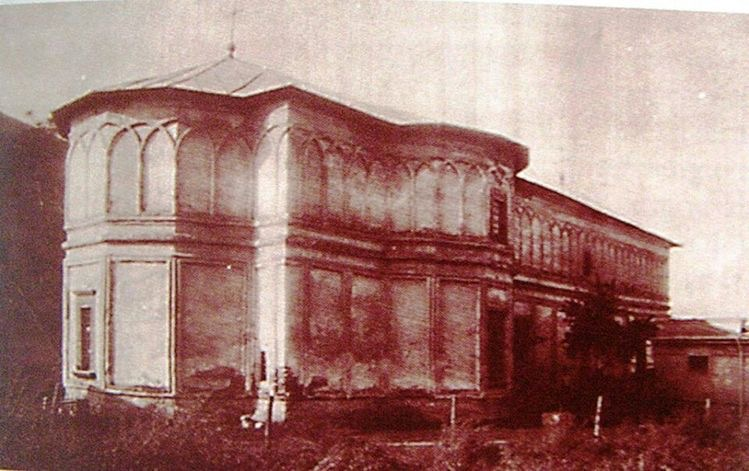
The Church of Saint John the Great Monastery during the 19th century, where the CEC Palace now lies.

Before the construction of the palace, the location was occupied by the ruins of a monastery (Saint John the Great) and an adjoining inn. The 16th-century church was renovated by Constantin Brâncoveanu between 1702 and 1703, but later deteriorated and was demolished in 1875.

The palace was built as a new headquarters for Romania's oldest bank, the public savings institution Casa de Depuneri, Consemnațiuni și Economie, later known as C.E.C. (Romanian: Casa de Economii și Consemnațiuni), and nowadays CEC Bank. The land was bought and the building constructed with the institution's own funds. Work started on June 8, 1897 and was completed in 1900. The project was designed by the architect Paul Gottereau, a graduate of the École nationale supérieure des Beaux-Arts in Paris; construction was supervised by the Romanian architect Ion Socolescu.

In 2009, it was the venue for the 60th birthday celebrations of Crown Princess Margareta of Romania, and in 2015 it was also the venue for the 25th anniversary of the celebration of Crown Princess Margareta's charity (FPMR).

== Architecture ==
Built in eclectic style, the palace is topped by a glass and metal dome. The entrance features an arch supported by two pairs of columns in composite style. The four corners are decorated with gables and coats of arms and ending in Renaissance domes.

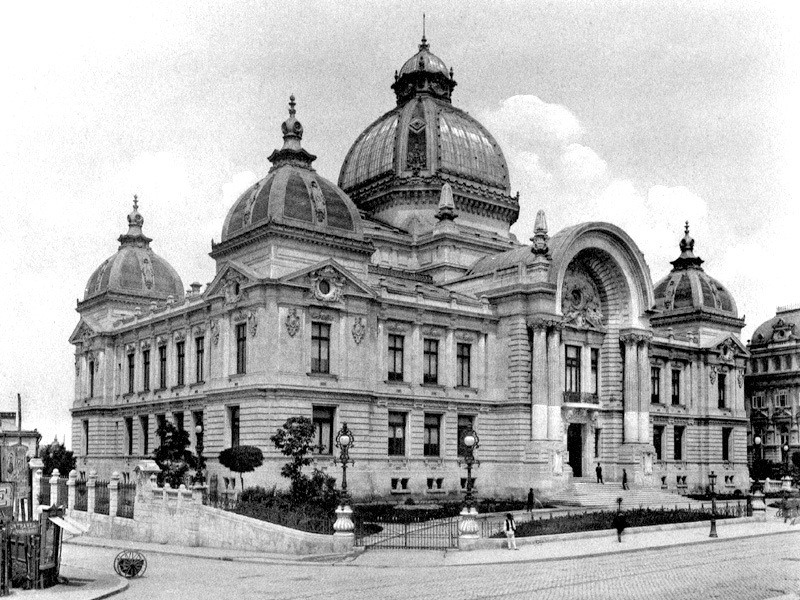

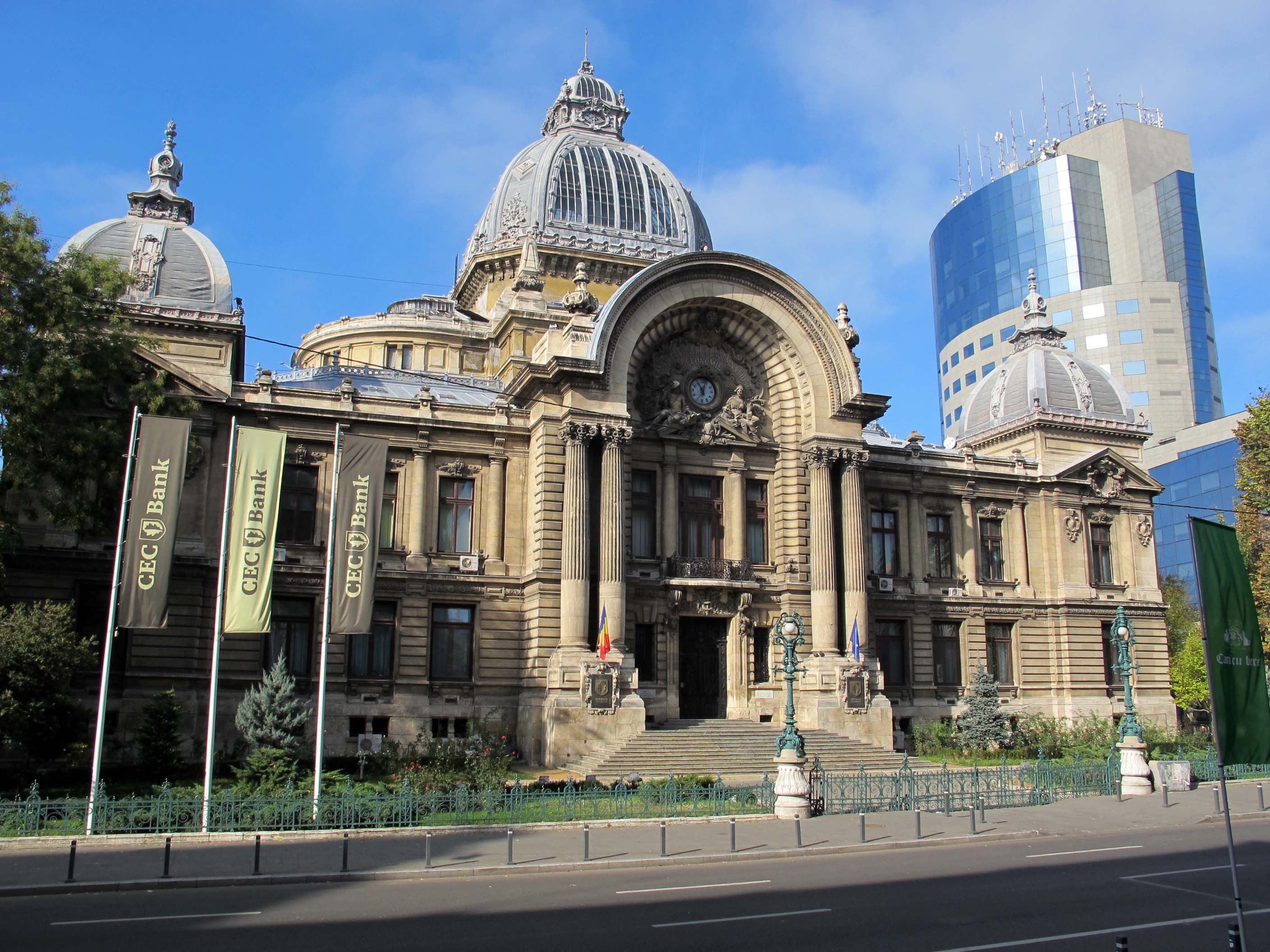

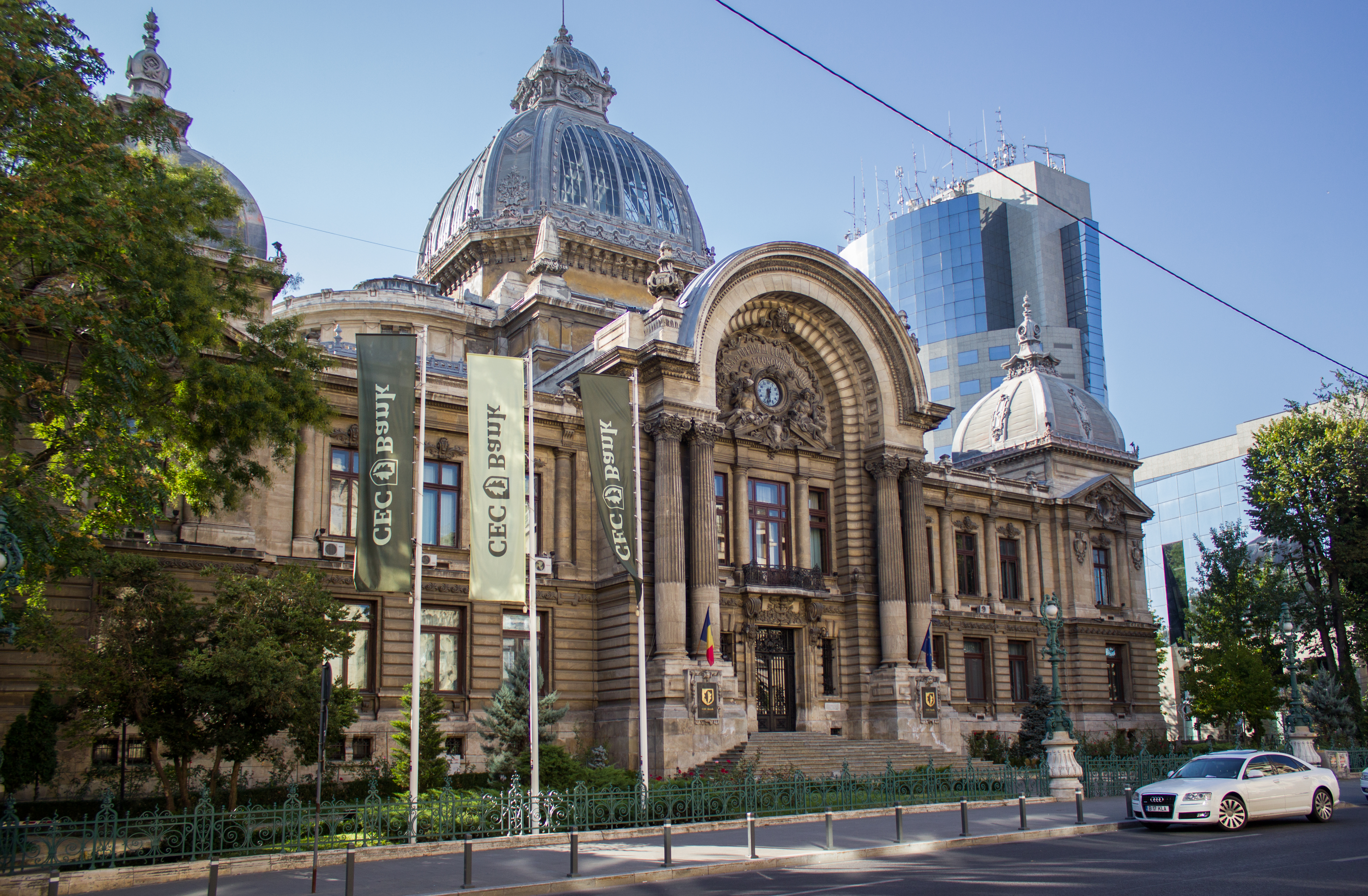

== See also ==
- List of palaces
