= Carmen Radu =

Romanian businessman

Carmen Radu is a former president and CEO of Exim Bank of Romania. Radu took on the role in 2005 and was replaced by Ionuț Costea in 2009. She formally occupied posts in the Ministry of Public Finance and was a director in the institution.

She graduated from the Bucharest Academy of Economic Studies (ASE) in 1985. From 2003 to 2006 she pursued her studies at the National University of Political Studies and Public Administration (SNSPA) and then obtained her PhD in Economics from ASE in 2010.
