= Libra Internet Bank =

Romanian company

- Type: Private company
- Industry: Finance and banking
- Predecessor: Libra Bank (2011)
- Founded: 1996
- Headquarters: Bucharest
- Number of locations: ▲59 branches (2025)
- Area served: Romania
- Key people: Cristina-Carmen Mahika-Voiconi (general manager); Radu Gratian Ghetea (chairman of the board)
- Services: Banking
- Net income: ▲324 million lei (2025)
- Total assets: ▲13902 million lei (2025)
- Total equity: 512.6 million lei (2025)
- Owner: New Century Holdings
- Number of employees: ▲1386 (2025)
- Website: librabank.ro

Libra Internet Bank is a bank from Romania founded in 1996. The bank has a niche strategy, specializing in areas such as liberal professions, real estate, and agribusiness.

Libra Internet Bank is a bank authorized to perform all activities specific to a commercial bank and some activities related to capital markets. Additionally, the bank is a member of SWIFT, shareholder of SNCDD, Transfond, and the Credit Bureau. The bank is a settlement agent for Financial Investment Services Companies (SSIF), intermediary on the secondary market for government securities, and depository for an investment fund.

Libra Internet Bank has issued bonds that are traded on the main segment of the Bucharest Stock Exchange.

== History ==
- 2022: Winning the best employer award in the financial sector for the third consecutive year
- 2020: Partnerships with the most important international fintechs active in Romania
- 2016: First 100% online credit in Romania
- 2014:
  - Niche strategy: real estate developers for residential projects
  - First 100% online account in Romania
- 2012: Niche strategy: Agribusiness
- 2004: Niche strategy: Liberal professions
- 2003: From May 2003, it became a member of the American investment group New Century Holdings (NCH).
- 1998: Becomes a member of the Romanian Association of Banks in February
- 1997: Becomes operational
- 1996: Founded, with Viorel Cataramă and former Minister of Defense, Victor Babiuc among the founding members.

== See also ==
- List of banks in Romania
