= Caritas (Ponzi scheme) =

1990s Ponzi scheme in Romania

Caritas was a Ponzi scheme in Romania that was active between April 1992 and August 1994. It attracted millions of depositors from all over the country, who invested more than a trillion old lei (between US$1 billion and $5 billion) before it finally went bankrupt on 14 August 1994, having a debt of US$450 million ($977 million in current terms).

== History ==
The Caritas company, which organized the scheme, was founded by Ioan Stoica in April 1992 in Brașov as a limited liability company with just 100,000 lei (US$500, or $1147 in current terms) in capital. Caritas moved to Cluj-Napoca two months later. The deposits were initially small (2,000–10,000 lei), but later, the minimum initial deposit was 20,000 lei, while the maximum was 160,000 lei. At the beginning, only residents of Cluj were allowed to make a deposit, but starting summer 1993, all Romanian citizens were allowed to participate.

It labeled itself a "mutual-aid game" (hence the name "Caritas", meaning charity in Latin) which had the purpose of helping impoverished Romanians during the transition to capitalism and promised eight times the money invested in six months.

Caritas prospered with the help of the connection it had with the nationalist Romanian National Unity Party (PUNR) and the mayor of Cluj-Napoca, Gheorghe Funar, who welcomed this scheme and even helped it build credibility by renting them space in the Cluj town hall, appearing with Stoica in public and on television, and defending Caritas from attacks. Funar paid for space in the local newspaper to publish a list of the "winners" who would see their money multiply eightfold; the list was 44 pages per day less than a month before the scheme collapsed.

== Size ==
The size of the scheme is unclear. Estimates vary between two and eight million depositors. The number most commonly quoted in the Romanian newspapers is four million, while the international newspapers tended to estimate their number to two or three million. In Autumn 1993, the list of names to be paid on a certain day as published in a Transylvanian newspaper included 22,000 names, which suggests that there were 660,000 depositors at one time. An estimate in 1993 said that one-third of all of Romania's money moved through Caritas.

Dan Pascariu, a banker and the chairman of Bancorex, estimated that between 35% and 50% of Romanian households were involved in the scheme. Mugur Isărescu, the president of the National Bank of Romania, estimated that it held a third of Romania's banknotes at one point.

An estimate of Romanian newspaper România Liberă gives the amount of money involved as 1.4 trillion lei or about 20% of the 1993 expenditures of the Romanian government of 6.6 trillion. The New York Times estimated the scheme attracted between $1 billion and $5 billion.

== Bankruptcy ==
The Romanian government banned pyramid schemes only after Caritas went bankrupt. The government received warnings about the scheme from several sources, including the Romanian Intelligence Service, which wrote a report in early 1993 (leaked to the press) and from Daniel Dăianu, the chief economist at the National Bank, who called it a fraud.

As president Ion Iliescu commented on the issue, the main reason why the government allowed the game to go on was the fear of being ousted by riots and protests, or being afraid that such a measure would make it more unpopular.

The first signs of the downfall were in autumn 1993, when several western newspapers ran articles on Caritas predicting its failure. At the same time, more and more Romanian newspapers published stories on it. In a press conference in September 1993, president Iliescu predicted its demise, noting that anyone with an elementary education could predict that anything which gives eightfold returns in three months cannot last.

There were discussions in parliament on banning such schemes. The state-controlled Romanian Television ran a negative report on Caritas, which indicated that it might have problems with the state.

After this, the operations stopped for two days, initially explained as a computer error. Stoica tried to show that everything was fine by opening a large supermarket in Cluj-Napoca. Although Caritas opened new branches in more cities, it failed to gather enough money to continue its activity and it was not able to pay back money for those who deposited after July 5.

In February 1994, Stoica claimed Caritas was not dead, just reorganizing itself. Soon it again announced a temporary cessation of activities, blaming the government. Stoica announced the termination of activities on May 19, 1994, saying his staff was trying to find a way to return the money to some of the depositors.

Stoica was sentenced in 1995 by the Cluj Courthouse to seven years in prison for fraud, but he appealed and it was reduced to two years; then he went on to the Supreme Court of Justice and the sentence was reduced to one and a half years. He has been free since June 14, 1996. The trials between the depositors and the Caritas company were still under way as of 2004.
