= First Bank (Romania) =

- Formerly: Piraeus Bank Romania (2000-2018); Pater Bank (1995-2000)
- Company type: Societate pe Acțiuni (S.A.)
- Industry: Financial services
- Founded: May 3, 1995; 30 years ago
- Headquarters: Bucharest, Romania
- Area served: Romania
- Key people: Henk Paardekooper (CEO)
- Total assets: EUR 1.479 billion (31 December 2024)
- Owner: Independent; (1995–2000); Piraeus Bank; (2000–2018); J.C. Flowers & Co.; (2018–2024); Intesa Sanpaolo; (2024–present)
- Number of employees: 959 (2023)
- Website: firstbank.ro

First Bank was a Romanian bank founded in 1995 as Pater Bank. It was acquired by Italian group Intesa Sanpaolo in May 2024 and merged with Intesa Sanpaolo's Romanian branch (Intesa Sanpaolo Bank Romania) on 31 October 2025.

== History ==
Five years after it was founded, Pater Bank was sold in 2000 to Piraeus Bank, and its name was changed to reflect its new owner. Piraeus Bank sold its Romanian subsidiary to J.C. Flowers & Co. on 28 June 2018, who changed the bank's name to First Bank on 12 September 2018.

As of the following month, its shareholding structure became as follows:

- J.C. Flowers & Co. - 76.1%
- EBRD - 19%
- Natural persons - 4.9%

In April 2020, First Bank acquired and absorbed the Romanian subsidiary of Bank Leumi.

== Acquisition by Intesa Sanpaolo and subsequent merger ==
In May 2024, the Italian banking group Intesa Sanpaolo finalised the acquisition of Romanian lender First Bank, thus expanding its footprint in Romania.

On 31 October 2025, Intesa Sanpaolo merged First Bank into its Romanian branch (Intesa Sanpaolo Bank Romania), thus discontinuing the 'First Bank' brand in Romania.

== See also ==
- List of banks in Romania
- J.C. Flowers & Co.
