= Exim Banca Românească =

- Type: Public
- Industry: Finance and Insurance
- Founded: 1991
- Headquarters: Bucharest, Romania
- Key people: Carmen Radu (former CEO), Traian Sorin Halalai (current CEO)
- Products: Financial services
- Net income: 44,570,820 Romanian Leu (2024)
- Total assets: 26,945,807,103 Romanian Leu (2024)
- Number of employees: 1,317 (2024)
- Website: eximbank.ro

Exim Banca Românească, formerly a corporate bank known as EximBank and the Export–Import Bank of Romania, is a universal bank based in Bucharest, Romania. It was founded in 1992 as a public limited company, with the Romanian state being the majority shareholder. Currently, the majority of the shares, ie 95.3%, is managed by the Ministry of Finance, the other shareholders are SIF Banato Crisana - 0.31%, SIF Moldova - 0.31%, SIF Transilvania - 0.31%, SIF Muntenia - 0.42% and SIF Oltenia - 3.27%.

Export-Import Bank of Romania logo until 2023

In June 2019, Export-Import Bank of Romania has signed an agreement with National Bank of Greece (NBG) to acquire 99.28% stake in Banca Românească (BROM). Following the completion of the deal, EximBank will foray into the domestic retail banking market and will become a universal commercial bank. As a result of the deal, EximBank's market share is said to increase by 3%, placing it at one of the top 10 largest tenders in the country.

As a result of the merger with Banca Românească, on 10 May 2023, EximBank relaunched itself from a corporate bank to a universal bank, under the new name Exim Banca Românească.

== Three Seas Initiative Investment Fund ==
The twelve members of the Three Seas Initiative met for their first summit in 2016, in Dubrovnik. It is composed of Austria, Bulgaria, Croatia, Czech Republic, Estonia, Hungary, Latvia, Lithuania, Poland, Romania, Slovakia, and Slovenia.

In 2019, Bank Gospodarstwa Krajowego and Export–Import Bank of Romania established the Three Seas Initiative Investment Fund. It is focusing on projects creating transport, energy and digital infrastructure in the Three Seas region. The aim is to raise up to EUR 3-5 billion.

The Fund will engage, on a commercial basis, in infrastructure projects with a total value of up to EUR 100 billion, while the needs of the Three Seas region have been estimated at over EUR 570 billion.

== See also ==
- List of banks in Romania
