= CEC Bank =

Romanian state-owned banking institution

- Type: State-owned
- Industry: Finance and Insurance
- Founded: 1 December 1864
- Founder: Alexandru Ioan Cuza; Enric Winterhalder (first director)
- Headquarters: Bucharest, Romania
- Area served: Romania
- Key people: Bogdan Neacșu – president
- Products: Commercial banking, Investment banking, Private banking, Asset management
- Revenue: ▲1.47 billion RON (298.7 mil. €) (2021)
- Net income: RON 424,3 mil. (2022)
- Total assets: RON 61.748,7 mil. (2022)
- Website: www.cec.ro

CEC Bank (prior to May 6, 2008 Casa de Economii și Consemnațiuni, but already known then as CEC), is a state-owned Romanian banking institution.

In 1990, shortly after the Romanian Revolution of 1989, CEC had a 32.9% share of the Romanian market for banking; by 2006 this had fallen to 4.03%. At the end of 2009, CEC Bank had 1,351 branches, more than 800 of which were in rural Romania. After 2017 CEC began a protracted modernization process and as of January 2024, it had grown back to third-largest bank in Romania.

== History ==
CEC was founded in 1864—five years after the union of the two Danubian Principalities, and more than a decade before the Romanian state as such—as the Casa de Depuneri și Consemnațiuni (literally "Deposits and Consignments House" but effectively "Deposits and Consignments Bank": the Romanian casa is used analogously to the French caisse; both are related to the English cash.) In 1880, the name was changed to Casa de Depuneri, Consemnațiuni și Economie ("Deposits, Consignments and Savings House"). In 1881, the financially independent Casa de Economie ("Savings Bank"), was set up under its aegis.

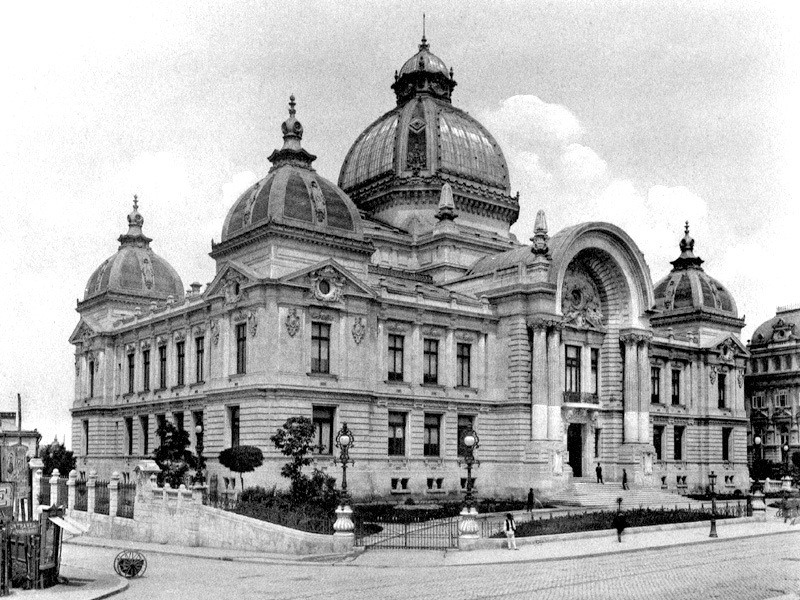
The CEC Palace shortly after its completion

In 1887, the cornerstone of the CEC Palace was set; the building opened as the bank's headquarters in 1900. As of 2012, CEC Bank is still headquartered there, although the building has been sold to the municipality of Bucharest for an eventual museum; CEC Bank is leasing the building until they build or otherwise obtain an appropriate modern headquarters.

Romania entered World War I belatedly on the Allied or Entente side, and was largely overrun by the forces of the Central Powers (see Romania in World War I). A portion of the bank's management remained in occupied Bucharest, while another portion relocated to Iași, in Northeast Romania. Prime minister Ion I. C. Brătianu decided to send the Bank's treasury, as well as other assets including the treasury of the National Bank of Romania, to Iași and later to Moscow.

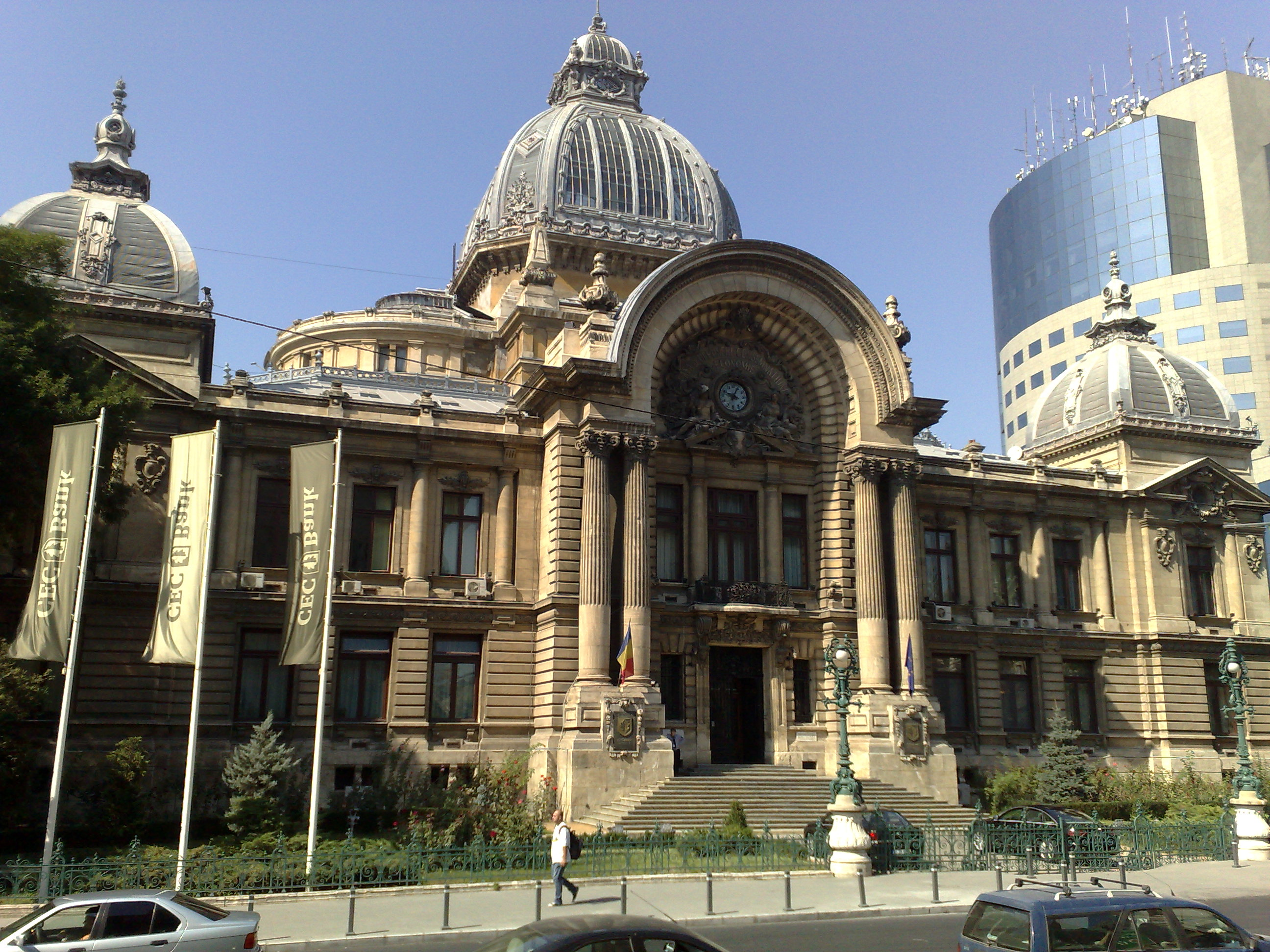
Present building

In 1930, the Casa de Economie was spun off as an institution in its own right, the Casa Generala de Economii ("General Savings House" or "General Savings Bank"), which in 1932 became the Casa Națională de Economii și Cecuri Poștale ("Savings and Postal Cheques National House", "National Bank for Savings and Postal Cheques", etc.). The two entities were joined back together at the start of the Communist era, in 1948.

In Communist Romania, CEC the main retail institution collecting household deposits and placing them into government-issued assets while being also involved in housing finance, similarly as DSK in Bulgaria, OTP in Hungary, and PKO in Poland. It created a number of types of accounts, including passbook savings accounts with various combinations of interest and prizes, and opened branches throughout Romania. From 1970 to 1985, CEC made housing loans as well. After the 1989 revolution, CEC began activities such as granting loans to other banks and dealing in government securities.

In 1996, Law No. 66 reorganized CEC as a joint-stock company with the Finance Ministry as its sole shareholder. Beginning in 2005, moves were made toward privatization. A 2006 attempt at privatization was cut short when the government was dissatisfied with the bids. The possibility of privatization was in play again in January 2011.

== See also ==
- List of banks in Romania
