= ProCredit Bank =

Bank in Germany

Coordinates: 50.121166°N 8.644731°E

ProCredit Bank Deutschland
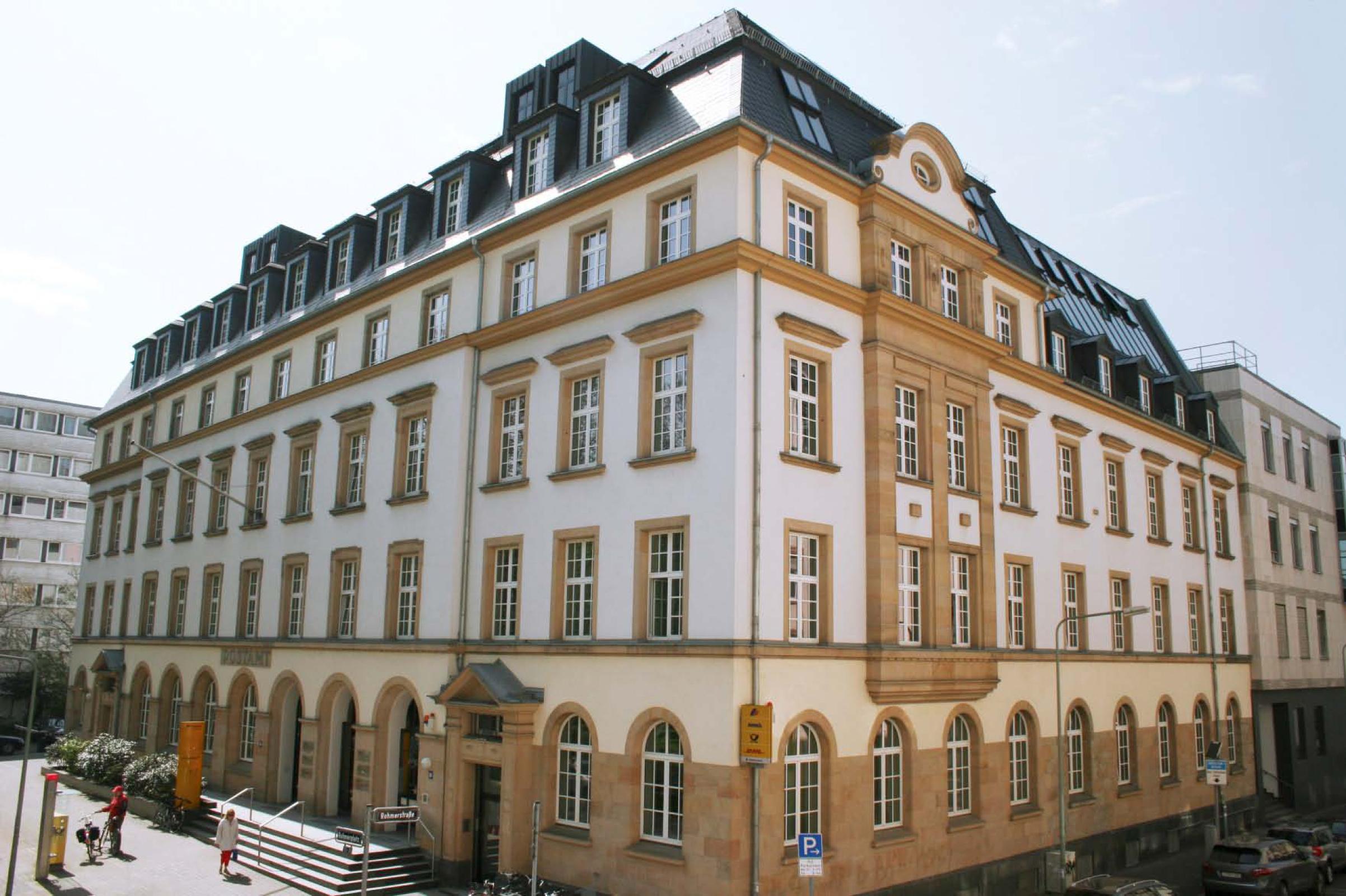
- Company type: Corporation
- Founded: 2012
- Headquarters: Frankfurt, Germany
- Total assets: €5,499 million (2017)
- Number of employees: 3,384 (2017)
- Parent: ProCredit Holding
- Website: www.procreditbank.de

The ProCredit Bank Deutschland is a bank based in Frankfurt am Main. It is the youngest bank of the ProCredit Holding, which operates primarily in Southeastern and Eastern Europe as well as in South America and wants to make a contribution to sustainable economic development through responsible banking business. The admission of the customer business in Germany took place in March 2013.

== Business model ==
The ProCredit Bank in Germany provides financial services for the ProCredit Banks worldwide and at the same time offers private and corporate customers in Germany a platform for engagement in Southeastern and Eastern Europe as well as South America. The bank specializes in small and medium-sized enterprises. The ProCredit Bank finances renewable energy projects and has an exclusion list for activities that are not funded. It also takes into account environmental risks when lending.

Within the ProCredit Holding, the ProCredit Bank in Germany is also a service bank for the other ProCredit Banks. It supports the liquidity management and financing of the ProCredit Holding Banks.

The ProCredit Bank is subject to German statutory deposit insurance. In addition, it is affiliated to the Deposit Guarantee Fund of the Bundesverband deutscher Banken. This increases the security limit to € 9,950,000 per customer.

== Ownership ==
The shares of the bank are held in full by the Frankfurt-based ProCredit Holding. This is a public-private partnership and the parent company of the ProCredit banks. The most important owners of the ProCredit Holding are Zeitinger Invest GmbH together with ProCredit Staff Invest GmbH & Co KG.

Other important shareholders are the German state development bank Kreditanstalt für Wiederaufbau (KfW) and the International Finance Corporation (IFC, a member of the World Bank Group) as well as the Dutch DOEN Foundation. In addition, various long-term and development-oriented investment companies are shareholders in the holding.

== Banking supervision ==
Since the issuing of the banking license for the ProCredit Bank in Germany, the ProCredit Holding banks worldwide are under the consolidated supervision of the Federal Financial Supervisory Authority (Bundesanstalt für Finanzdienstleistungsaufsicht, BaFin) and the Deutsche Bundesbank. Holding-wide risk management and standardized reporting for all countries were set up in accordance with German regulatory requirements.
