= Banca Românească =

- Company type: Subsidiary
- Industry: Financial services
- Founded: 1992
- Defunct: 2023
- Headquarters: Bucharest, Romania
- Products: Banking, insurance, asset management
- Parent: EximBank
- Website: www.eximbank.ro

Banca Românească was a Romanian bank based in Bucharest owned by Eximbank. In 2023, it was merged with Eximbank to form Exim Banca Românească.

== General data ==
The Bank owns over 100 locations (branches and business centers) and has 1,039 employees (December 2019). At the end of 2019, the Romanian Bank had assets of 6,630,686 RON.

== See also ==
- List of banks in Romania
