= Bancorex =

Coordinates: 44.432751°N 26.096164°E

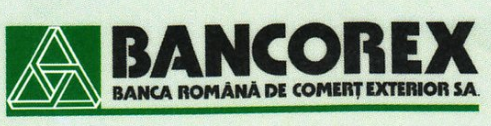
- Type: Government-owned corporation
- Industry: banking
- Founded: 1968
- Defunct: 2 August 1999
- Fate: government bailout, merger
- Successor: Banca Comercială Română
- Headquarters: Bucharest, Romania

Bancorex was the largest bank in Romania during the 1990s, accounting for more than a fourth of the banking market share when it was closed down in 1999. The bank failed due to non-performing loans that were related to political corruption, especially behind-the-scenes political dealings. The bank was bailed out by the Romanian state, its good assets being then merged with the more solvent Banca Comercială Română.

It was founded as the Banca Română de Comerț Exterior ("Romanian Bank for Foreign Trade") in 1968 and for decades it was the bank through which much of Romania's foreign trade was conducted.

== Bailout and merger ==
Toward the end of 1997, Bancorex received a sum of $600 million from the government, representing 2% of Romania's GDP. The recapitalization was followed by a management change in April 1998, but by not restructuring, the situation of the bank further deteriorated. It was only in late 1998, when a crisis hit Bancorex again, that the government considered restructuring the bank, eyeing a privatization procedure.

By 1999, it became clear that a recapitalization of the bank would require $2 billion (almost 6% of Romania's GDP), which couldn't have been afforded by the government. A February 1999 estimate said that $1.7 billion (or 85-90% of its loan portfolio), much of it in foreign currency, was non-performing. This sum represented 5% of Romania's GDP at the time.

In April 1999, Bancorex collapsed as depositors lined up to get their savings out of the bank. In order to prevent further bank runs, the Romanian authorities decided upon a fast liquidation, transferring bad assets to a newly created Asset Recovery Agency, while deposits and most of the structure of Bancorex were absorbed by another state-owned bank, Banca Comercială Română. The banking license was withdrawn on 31 July 1999, effective from 2 August 1999. The Romanian government compensated Banca Comercială Română for the liabilities transferred from Bancorex and gave it the right to refuse any assets of Bancorex.

== Cost of the bailout ==
In 1999, the government took into public debt from Bancorex a sum of $1.5 billion, or 4.5% of GDP, in addition to the 1997 recapitalization of $600 million and the assumption of some off-balance-sheet items and legal liabilities that have not been disclosed in order to protect the politicians that approved non-performing loans. .

== See also ==
- List of banks in Romania
