= ProCredit Holding =

Banking company

- Type: Public
- Industry: Financial services
- Founded: 1998
- Headquarters: Frankfurt am Main, Germany
- Key people: Eriola Bibolli (Chair of the Management Board); Christian Dagrosa; Christoph Beeck; Georgios Chatzis
- Products: Financial services
- Total assets: €11.595 billion Loan portfolio: €7.752 billion Customer deposits: €9.136 billion (2025)
- Website: www.procredit-holding.com

ProCredit Holding AG, based in Frankfurt am Main, is the parent company of ProCredit group, an international group of commercial and retail banks operating primarily in South Eastern and Eastern Europe. ProCredit banks specialize in providing financial services to micro, small and medium-sized enterprises (MSMEs) as well as private individuals.

ProCredit Holding, which began as Internationale Micro Investitionen AG, was founded in 1998 and is currently managed by Eriola Bibolli, Christian Dagrosa, Christoph Beeck and Georgios Chatzis. As the superordinate institution of the ProCredit group, ProCredit Holding is regulated on a consolidated basis by the German financial supervisory authorities, namely the Federal Financial Supervisory Authority (BaFin) and the Deutsche Bundesbank. The company has a Fitch Rating of BBB

== ProCredit Holding banks ==
A full list of the banks in the ProCredit group can be found in the following table.

Name	Ownership	Reference
ProCredit Bank Albania	100 % ProCredit Holding
ProCredit Bank Bosnia and Herzegovina	100 % ProCredit Holding
ProCredit Bank Bulgaria	100 % ProCredit Holding
ProCredit Bank Germany	100 % ProCredit Holding
ProCredit Bank Ecuador	100 % ProCredit Holding
ProCredit Bank Georgia	100 % ProCredit Holding
ProCredit Bank Kosovo	100 % ProCredit Holding
ProCredit Bank North Macedonia	100 % ProCredit Holding
ProCredit Bank Moldova	100 % ProCredit Holding
ProCredit Bank Romania	100 % ProCredit Holding
ProCredit Bank Serbia	100 % ProCredit Holding
ProCredit Bank Ukraine	100 % ProCredit Holding

== Shareholders ==
Major shareholders of ProCredit Holding AG (with holdings above 5%) are listed below.:

- Zeitinger Invest GmbH (18.3%)
- KfW (13.2%)
- The Dutch DOEN Participaties (12.5%)
- EBRD (8,7%)

== See also ==
- List of banks in the euro area
- List of banks in Germany
