= Banca Comercială Română =

Romanian bank

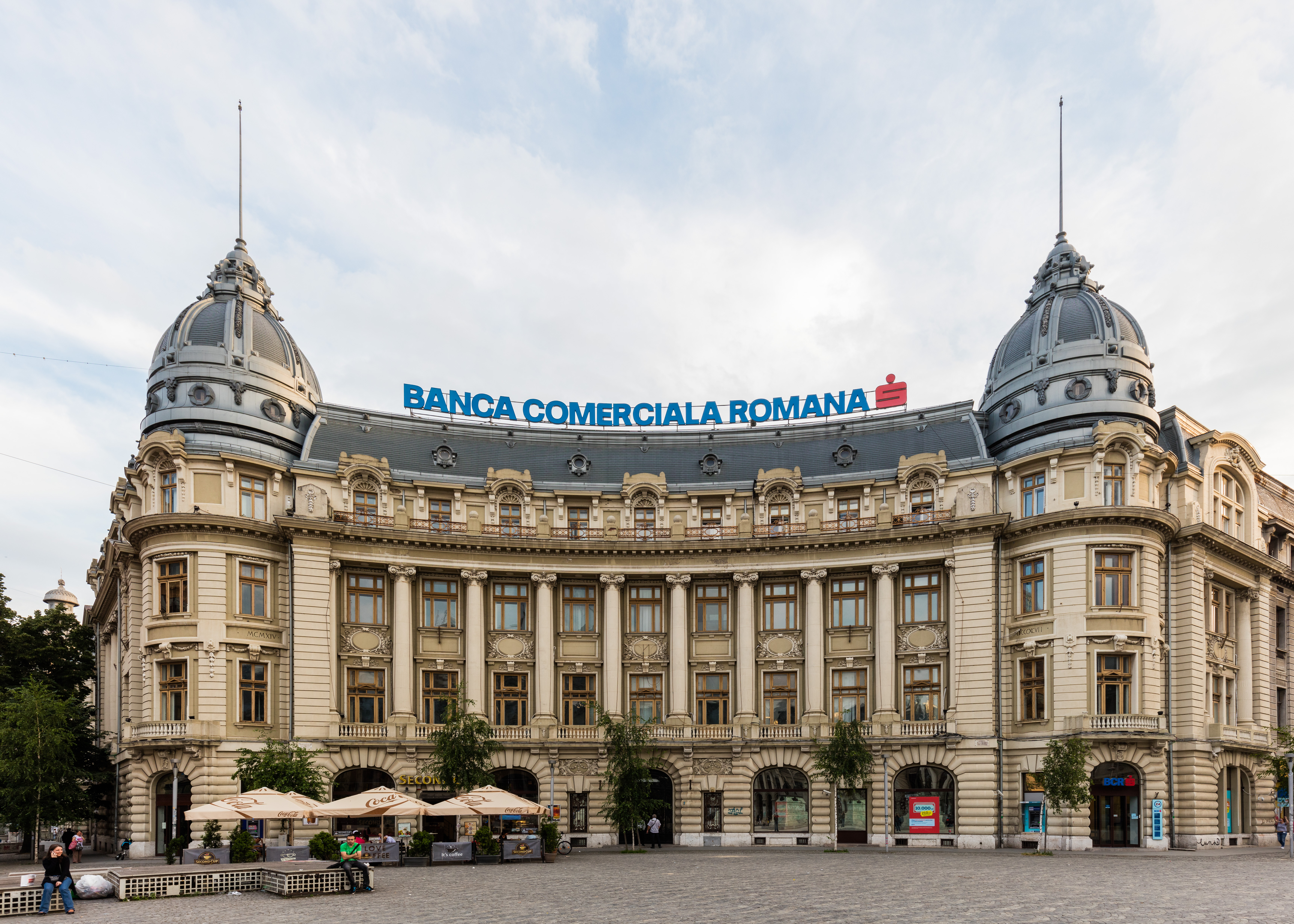
- BCR's headquarters in Bucharest, Romania
- Type: Subsidiary
- Traded as: WBAG: EBS; PSE: EBS; BVB: EBS; ATX Index component; PX Index component
- ISIN: AT0000652011
- Industry: Financial services
- Founded: December 1, 1990; 35 years ago
- Headquarters: The Bridge 1 Building, Bucharest, Romania
- Key people: Sergiu Manea (CEO)
- Products: Retail banking; Commercial bank; Investment banking; Private banking; Wealth management
- Operating income: ▲€ 1.22 billion (2024)
- Net income: ▲€ 556 million (2024)
- Total assets: ▲€ 28.7 billion (2024)
- Total equity: ▲€ 7.35 billion (2024)
- Number of employees: 5,220 (2024)
- Parent: Erste Group
- Capital ratio: Tier 1+2 20.9% (2024)
- Rating: Moody's: BBB+; Fitch: Baa1
- Website: www.bcr.ro

Banca Comercială Română (BCR) is a Romanian financial services company and investment bank. Founded in 1990 following the restructuring of the National Bank of Romania, BCR is headquartered in Bucharest and operates as the primary Romanian subsidiary of the Austrian-based Erste Group. It is considered a systemically important financial institution by the National Bank of Romania.

Banca Comercială Română offers services in universal banking, investment banking, spanning retail and corporate finance, treasury management, securities brokerage, asset management, wealth management and private pension. It provides advisory for mergers and acquisitions (M&A), project finance, and structured finance for large-scale infrastructure and energy projects. As a key participant in the Romanian capital markets, it serves as a primary dealer for government bonds and provides extensive custody and settlement services.

== History ==
=== Founding and Early Years ===
Banca Comercială Română (BCR) was established on December 1, 1990, by the Romanian government through Resolution No. 1195, which transferred the commercial banking operations previously handled by the National Bank of Romania to the new entity as part of the country's shift toward economic liberalization following the fall of communism. As a state-owned universal bank, BCR assumed responsibility for retail, corporate, and international transactions amid Romania's turbulent post-communist economic environment, which featured high inflation, currency instability, and a nascent market economy. This foundational role positioned BCR as a key institution in facilitating the transition from a centralized to a market-oriented financial system, serving as the primary channel for commercial banking services during a period of significant structural reforms.

=== Expansion and Acquisition Era ===
Bank logo before privatization

During the early 2000s, Banca Comercială Română (BCR) pursued aggressive growth strategies to modernize its operations and position itself for Romania's impending European Union accession in 2007, focusing on product innovation and infrastructural expansion while undergoing preparatory reforms for privatization. In 2001, BCR launched BCR Leasing. This move aligned with broader efforts to broaden revenue streams amid Romania's economic liberalization.

=== Post-Acquisition Developments ===
In October 2006, Erste Group Bank AG completed its acquisition of a 61.88% stake in Banca Comercială Română (BCR) for €3.75 billion from the Romanian Authority for State Assets Recovery (AVAS), the European Bank for Reconstruction and Development (EBRD), and the International Finance Corporation (IFC), marking a pivotal shift toward foreign ownership and integration into a larger Central and Eastern European banking network. This transaction positioned BCR as Erste Group's largest subsidiary by assets and client base, facilitating the transfer of advanced banking practices to Romania's leading lender.

== See also ==
- List of banks in Romania
