= Ieremia Cecan =

Romanian journalist and priest (1867–1941)

Ieremia Teodor Cecan
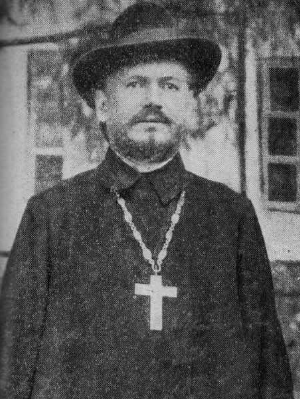

Regional leader of the Romanian National Socialist Party
- In office September – December 1933

Personal details
- Born: May 31, 1867 Novoselitsa or Beleuța, Bessarabia Governorate, Russian Empire
- Died: June 27, 1941 (aged 74) Tiraspol, Moldavian SSR, Soviet Union
- Other political affiliations: Union of the Russian People (1906–1912); Committee for the Salvation of Bessarabia (1919); League of Bessarabian Christians (ca. 1922); Iron Guard (ca. 1933); National Renaissance Front (ca. 1938)
- Spouse: Eugenia Cecan
- Relations: Octavian Vasu (son-in-law)
- Profession: Priest, theologian, journalist, agriculturalist, inventor

Military service
- Allegiance: Russian Republic; Ukrainian Soviet Socialist Republic
- Years of service: 1917–1919
- Battles/wars: World War I; Eastern Front; Russian Civil War; Southern Front; Soviet–Ukrainian War

Ieremia Teodor Cecan (first name also Jeremia, Eremia or Irimia, last name also Ciocan; Russian: Иеремия Федорович Чекан, romanized: Yeremya Fedorovich Chekan; May 31, 1867 – June 27, 1941) was a Bessarabian-born Romanian journalist, Bessarabian Orthodox priest and political figure. During the first part of his life, he was active in the Bessarabia Governorate of the Russian Empire, earning his reputation as a Christian philanthropist and putting out the pioneering church magazine Nashe Obyedineniye. His opposition to Russification and his advocacy of social improvement led to a public scandal and then to his demotion by church officials, and pushed Cecan into independent journalism. However, his sympathies remained with the conservative-antisemitic Union of the Russian People, developing into a critique of Romanian nationalism that was well liked by the imperial authorities. During the latter stages of World War I, Cecan was a chaplain in the Russian Army.

Opposing the union of Bessarabia with Romania from a conservative position, Cecan fled to Odessa in November 1918. For the following two years, he championed the cause of Russian Bessarabia, and came into contact with the Bolsheviks. He recruited for the Red Army, and was himself drafted in 1919, briefly serving under Mishka Yaponchik. Threatened with retaliation by the White movement, and hoping that Romanian loyalism would save his son from a Romanian prison, he returned to Bessarabia in 1920. During the subsequent two decades, he found himself at odds with the Bessarabian church hierarchs, especially after advocating the preservation of services in Russian and Slavonic. Cecan founded a series of short-lived newspapers in Russian, most of which bridged the distance between the Romanians and the White émigrés. Much of his work focused on attempts at dialogue and reunification between the Orthodox and the Catholics, sparking controversy among his colleagues in the Romanian Orthodox Church, but earning notoriety in Western circles. He maintained to his death the vision of a "world church" centered on anti-communism and anti-Masonry, which, in Cecan's opinion, were intertwined.

In the 1920 and early '30s, Cecan became a perennial candidate in elections for the Parliament of Romania. In 1933, retired from active priesthood and finally defrocked, he veered toward Nazism, which he considered a manifestation of Christian socialism. He served for as regional president of the Romanian National Socialist Party, and put out its Russian-language newspaper, Telegraf. When the party fell apart, Cecan attempted to resume his political career with the Iron Guard and the National Renaissance Front. His final activities in the press evidenced his turn to anti-fascism, condemnation of antisemitism, and admiration for the Soviet Union. Increasingly isolated during the final stages of his life, he focused on his work as an agricultural inventor. Cecan was captured by the Soviets during the 1940 occupation of Bessarabia, then sentenced to death for his anti-communist past. He was ultimately shot in Tiraspol during the retreat of June 1941.

== Biography ==
=== In the Russian Empire ===
Cecan was born among the Romanians of Novoselitsa (Noua Suliță or Novoselytsia) or Beleuța village, Hotin County. Both were located in the northern tip of the Bessarabia Governorate, Russia (now in Chernivtsi Oblast, Ukraine). His native area had been split from ancient Moldavia; Western Moldavia remained in Romania, whereas the Moldavian sub-region of Bukovina, just west of Novoselitsa, was administered by Austria-Hungary. Ieremia Teodor's original surname was Ciocan ("hammer"), which was approximated into Russian as Chekan, then mutated back into Romanian as Cecan. He went on to study in Kishinev (Chișinău), training at the Theological Seminary (in 1889). He began his mission as a priest in Kotylevo, just outside Novoselitsa, before being assigned the central Bessarabian parish of Roșcani, then transferred to Nișcani. In 1910 Cecan built a new local church, its inauguration attended by Governor Ivan Kankrin and Marshal of Nobility Alexander N. Krupensky. His activity doubled as a schoolteacher and catechist, allowing him to open the Nișcani parish school, after running a successful fundraiser in 1912; he then did the same for the communities of Răciula and Păulești. He was by then married and had five children of his own: Lyudmila, Zinaida, Alexander, Nikolai, and Boris.

The Eparchy of Kishinev and Khotin appointed Cecan as its "spiritual investigator" in Orhei County, and also assigned him to an unpaid position at the Diocesan Temperance Committee. He recommended himself as an early champion of the lower classes: "To the end of his days, he remained proud of the fact that he had achieved the dismissal of a zemstvo chief, who struck a peasant in the face." While active in his parishes, Cecan also furthered his studies in theology at Kiev Academy. He became a passionate reader and follower of Vladimir Solovyov, as well as a speaker for the reunification of Orthodoxy and Catholicism. In his later articles on the subject, Cecan favored leniency toward the use of Filioque in the Nicene Creed and accepted the doctrine of papal infallibility.

Officially, Cecan favored Russification and displayed his support for the House of Romanov and Tsarist autocracy—by 1906, he had joined the Union of the Russian People (SRN, known locally as the "League of True Russians"), serving as a member of its executive board in Călărași. Cecan "was co-opted into the union's leadership in 1907 and served as the official Bessarabian representative within the union's Main Board." Later, he put up some opposition to Archbishop Seraphim Chichagov, who opposed all forms of Romanian nationalism. On the archbishop's orders, the Eparchy began putting out journals with increasingly Russified content, and also with shows of support for the monarchy. As seen by historian Piotr Șornikov, Cecan was an exponent of "Moldavian patriotism" during the Russian Revolution of 1905; this meant advocating for Bessarabian autonomy and language rights in the province, while expressing loyalty toward the Romanovs' "Russian statism". The outlook was shaped by Seraphim, whom historian Andrei Cușco depicts as "the first Moldovanist"; Seraphim himself "articulate[d] the idea of the fundamental difference and even antagonism between Moldovan and Romanian linguistic identity".

From December 18, 1909, Cecan and his wife Eugenia began putting out Nashe Obyedineniye ("Our Association" or "Our Union"). Presumably "the only private-owned church magazine" in early 20th-century Russia, it had a maximum of 800 copies per issue. Although mostly in Russian, this publication was mainly aimed at the Bessarabian–Moldavian priests and other Romanian-speaking intellectuals. Its Romanian-language content was directed at the peasants and the schoolteachers, focusing on ideals of social improvement and education. These were regarded as independent and progressive stances—for such reasons, it came to be indexed by Okhrana agents.

As a Romanian nationalist, Ion Pelivan doubts that Nashe Obyedineniye was ever pro-Romanian in content: "[it] came out with corresponding text in Roumanian [sic] to fight against the increasing influence of Roumanian newspapers." Similarly, in a Bessarabian column published by Neamul Românesc in October 1910, Cecan's paper was described as a "clerical gazette", whose Moldavian-only content was to "facilitate the learning of Russian by the Moldavians." It called Cecan (or "Ciocan") a "Russified Romanian priest". Criticized by Seraphim and by the conservative Russian press (the journals Besarabskaya Zhizn' and Drug), Nashe Obyedineniye closed down formally in August 1911 and reemerged instantly as Obyedineniye, with Eugenia Cecan for its editor. Published from Nișcani, it drew contributions from Orthodox intellectuals such as Andrei Murafa. Despite being identified as anti-conservative dissenters, the Cecans generally took up the cause of far-right Russian nationalism. In its pages, Obyedineniye expressed full support for the SRN, and in particular for the antisemitic agitator Pavel Krushevan.

Reportedly, Father Ieremia was also co-opted by his former critics at Drug, which was otherwise noted for its strong expressions of anti-Romanian sentiment. In preparation for the legislative election of September 1912, he was called upon by Alexander Makarov, the Russian Minister of Internal Affairs, to oversee the election and ensure that overt expressions of Romanian nationalism were being marginalized. Cecan and Alexandru Baltagă founded some 29 electoral committees on Eparchy grounds. This led them into open conflict with Archbishop Seraphim, who had ordered his clergy not to interfere with politics. After signing their names to a letter of protest against Seraphim's "absolutism", Cecan and Baltagă were demoted and stripped of their parishes. Obyedineniye put out its last issue on August 23, 1912.

=== World War I and revolutionary exile ===
Șornikov notes that, although in conflict with Seraphim and threatened to lose his income, Cecan was honored by the Russian authorities. Awards he received included medals marking the annexation of Bessarabia centennial (1912) and the 300th anniversary of the Romanovs (1913), as well as the Order of Saint Anna, 3rd class. Reassigned to the Kishinev Church of the Nativity, where he opened a school, Cecan was finally able to resume his journalistic activity, founding, in 1914, the newspaper Bessarabets. He was moderating his stances: although still representing the "right-wing section of the Eparchy", he opened up to former adversaries on the right and the left, together with whom he put out Bessarabya (1914), then Bessarabaskaya Pochta and Nash Dolg (both 1915). The latter functioned as an appendage of the Church of the Nativity and its orphanage.

During World War I, Cecan enjoyed friendly contacts with the eparchy's officials, who allowed him to publish in the official bulletin, Kishinyovskie Eparhial'nye Vedomosti. In August 1915, he contributed therein a piece in favor of agricultural schools for the newly orphaned. He argued that doing so would empower the future peasants economically and ensure that they remained patriotic and proud citizens of the Empire. Sociologist Andrei Dumbrăveanu describes this text as proof that Cecan, "many times defeated, arrived, whether aware or unwitting, at shaping the minds of Bessarabians as required in times of war." The following year, Cecan was designated as editor of the revamped Kishinyovskie Eparhial'nye Vedomosti, though this revival never actually took place. Pelivan notes that, like Drug, Bessarabya was receiving secret funding from the Russian Interior Ministry. Cecan himself acknowledged that the government of Prince Golitsyn was paying him 1,200 rubles monthly, because he "championed ethnic-Russian interests on the periphery of Russia and fought against the separatism of Moldavian elements". According to Șornikov, Cecan's overall activity at that stage shows him as a "defensist", or one who fully supported Russian victory against the Central Powers.

In 1934, Cecan claimed to have predicted the anti-Christian strife of the Revolutions of 1917 as early as 1909. During the February Revolution, he had joined the Russian Army as a chaplain. In the aftermath, the Russian Provisional Government stopped donating to propaganda outlets, including Cecan and his newspapers, causing him to issue a note of protest. In April of that year, he attended the Kishinev Priests' Congress, which gave endorsement to the notion of an autonomous Bessarabia—organized in December as the Moldavian Democratic Republic. During its proceedings, he supported land reform and allotment for the clergy, arguing that such measures could result in material advancement for his class; the Congress endorsed his position, allowing priests to partake in agararian reforms.

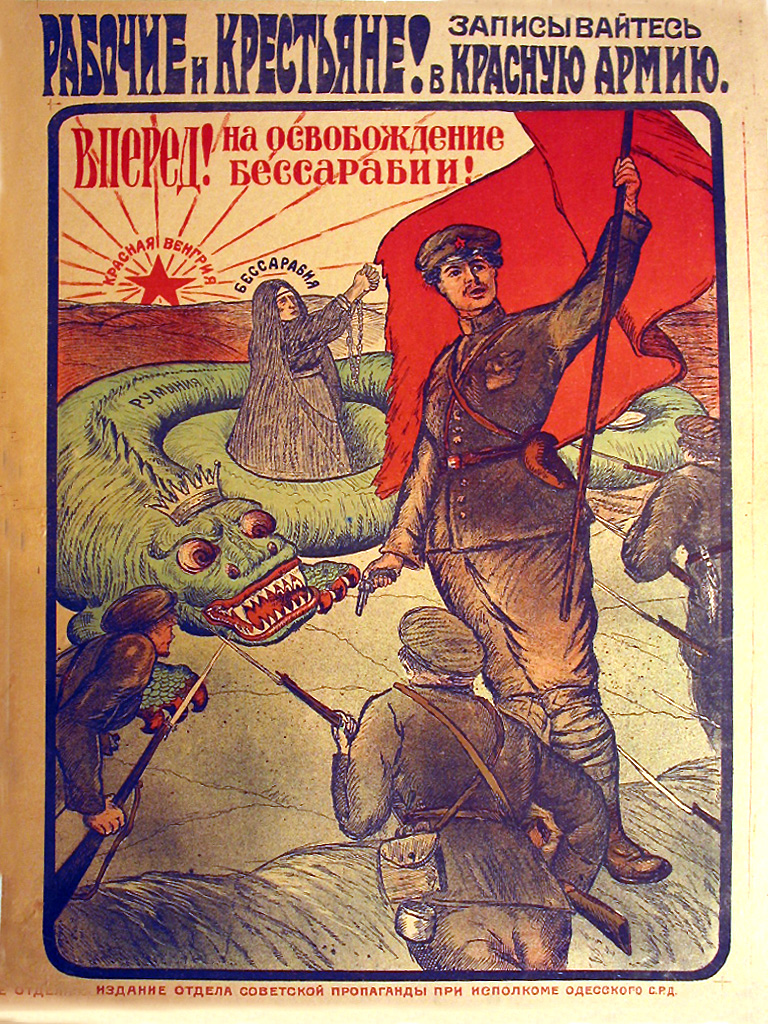
Bolshevik recruitment poster, calling for the "liberation of Bessarabia". Published in Odessa in or around 1919

Cecan remained committed to Russian federalism; he was therefore vexed when the Moldavian Republic united with Romania in early 1918, claiming at the time that his former friend Baltagă had been corrupted into endorsing Greater Romania. As reported by Șornikov, Cecan defied the Romanian military intervention in Bessarabia by making frequent trips into the Ukrainian People's Republic (UNR) and bringing back with him works of anti-Romanian propaganda. Sensing himself threatened by the new regime, Cecan finally left Bessarabia for the UNR in November 1918. Settling in Odessa (which remained his main residence to May 1920), he was first co-opted by the Committee for the Salvation of Bessarabia, formed there by two Russian nationalist leaders, Krupensky and Alexandr K. Schmidt. The activity also absorbed his son Nikolai, who was captured by the Romanians in March 1919 "while transporting his father's letters and anti-Romanian newspapers from Odessa". The same month, Chișinău's Tribunal issued a warrant for "the priest Ieremia Cecan, formerly of Chișinău, current address unknown".

Cecan Sr's collaboration with the Red Army and the Ukrainian Soviet Socialist Republic had begun some two months later, when he proceeded to recruit Bessarabians exiles to fight as partisans behind Romanian lines in the Ukrainian civil war. A late report notes his presence in Odessa station, "cross in hand", and using the racial trope conflating Romanians with nomadic Romanies (he was "urging the Russian soldiers to chase the Gypsies out of Bessarabia"). Though he was largely successful in organizing a detachment, he was placed under surveillance by the city's Special Department, and twice arrested as a "counterrevolutionary". In mid 1919, Cecan was recruited by the Red Army in its clashes with the UNR, and joined the Odessa riflemen commanded by a Jewish mobster, Mishka Yaponchik. He saw action against the Ukrainian People's Army, including outside Voznesensk on the Southern Bug, where Yaponchik was killed. One hostile report suggests that Cecan fled the battle; according to Șornikov, this cannot be accurate, as all deserters, including Yaponchik, had been massacred on the spot by the Cheka.

A clampdown on Bolshevik activities began during the Odessa Operation, with the area now controlled by the Armed Forces of South Russia—and, as such, by the anti-communist White movement. Fearing for his life, Cecan moved to the city of Tiraspol, on the border with Bessarabia, and established there the newspaper Tiraspol'skoe Slovo ("Tiraspol's Word"); he was reportedly active there in early 1920, during the brief episode of Bolshevik rule under Grigory Kotovsky. Though his son was still held by the Romanians in Chișinău prison, Cecan finally decided to emigrate into Romania and pledge himself to the new Metropolis of Bessarabia. He obtained approval from Metropolitan Gurie Grosu (in exchange for Cecan's promise that he would stay out of Chișinău), but still returned to Bessarabia "essentially illegally", by rowing his boat across the Dniester.

=== Raza and ecumenism ===
As noted by Șornikov, Cecan became unusually "laconic" about his Ukrainian exile, and did not mention his service under Yaponchik. During his later life in Romania, he simply noted his activity at Tiraspol'skoe Slovo; the priest always mentioned that his Bolshevik captors were merciful, "although they knew I was a monarchist." During or after the Bessarabian union, Cecan had married off his daughter Zinaida to a Transylvanian Romanian lawyer, Octavian Vasu. In February 1914, Vasu held an executive's position inside the Romanian National Party of Austria-Hungary. Noted for his excellent command of Russian, he was taken prisoner in Bessarabia during the world war, when he helped set up the Romanian Volunteer Corps in Russia. During the subsequent creation of Greater Romania, he became the first Prefect of Făgăraș County.

Cecan's status was improved by these political developments, seeing him ordained as a Protoiereus of the Romanian Orthodox Church. In October 1920, he asked Romanian authorities to grant him 500 thousand lei for propaganda work to contain the spread of communism in Bessarabia. However, he would not honor his agreement with Gurie Grosu, refusing to leave Chișinău for a countryside posting; described in official records as a "provocateur", he was swiftly defrocked in 1920. In March 1921, he published a pamphlet against Baltagă and other figures of the Metropolis, claiming that they were using their relative autonomy to embezzle church funds. He eventually returned to his Nișcani parish, and continued to involve himself in political and religious disputes. His reissue of Obyedineniye sold poorly and ended abruptly. By 1925–1926, he was putting out the magazine Unirea (or Yedineniye), which was a continuation of Obyedineniye. At some point between 1920 and 1923, he adhered to the League of Bessarabian Christians, a political party created by Nicolae Negru, where the focus was on far-right antisemitism and Bessarabian regionalism.

In both Unirea and his propaganda brochures, Cecan took a strongly anti-communist and anti-Soviet position, describing communism as being intertwined with Pan-Slavism and Russian Orthodoxy. He investigated ways of emancipating Romanian Orthodoxy from its Slavic counterparts, looking into the precedent set by the Romanian Church United with Rome, Greek-Catholic. However, Cecan had lost confidence in autonomist projects, noting that they could only bring failure in the long run. He instead defended worship in Slavonic or Russian, against official Romanianization. Such activities, and questions about his status during the Revolution, pushed the Romanian intelligence agency, Siguranța, to keep a file on Cecan. Informants believed that he was de-legitimizing mainstream autonomists as a ruse, so that his own "subversive" movement of "Bolshevik tendencies" would gain exposure and popularity. Other reports focused on Cecan's interpretation of the "Jewish Question": in September 1930, shortly after an attempted pogrom in Chișinău, he reportedly told publisher Averbukh that "he had never been an antisemite with all his heart". As noted by Șornikov, the Cecan dossier became unusually large; although agents working his case "were illiterate and negligent", the file offers a minute record of his beliefs and affiliations.

Cecan unsuccessfully ran in the parliamentary elections of May 1926, June 1927, December 1928, and July 1932. In the mid 1920s, he had reconciled with the regionalist caucus, and was pushing for increased autonomy of the Metropolis (though he still disliked Gurie, and called his election a sample of "banditry" by the Romanian state officials); he returned to his old ecumenical goals, working closely with the Catholic Bishopric of Iași and Monsignor Anton Gabor to set up a Christian institute in Bessarabia. He was also in touch with Nicolae Brînzeu, the Greek-Catholic priest, who regarded Cecan as a "most courageous" intellectual. His ideas on reunification were circulated by liberal Catholic papers in the West, including, in 1924, La Paix. The latter newspaper also gave exposure to Cecan's take on the Immaculate Conception, on which topic he did not "foresee insuperable difficulty".

In January 1929, days after executive power had been handed to the National Peasants' Party (PNȚ), Cecan attended the Bessarabian Agronomists' Congress, where he spoke about the need to increase productivity among the smallholders. At the Eparchy Assembly of October 1930, he voiced his distrust toward Nasha Rech and Romania's other Russian-language newspapers, seen by him as enemies of the church. He had become publicly opposed to the PNȚ and all other mainstream groups, growing supportive of the anti-establishment Vlad Țepeș League. In a letter he sent to the League's newspaper, Epoca, he theorized that Romanian "politicking" and "demagoguery" were a threat exponentially greater than communism.

Also then, Cecan explained that he was no longer an active priest, and was collecting his pension, wishing only to become a "free citizen". The PNȚ's relaxation of censorship laws convinced him that he could return to his work as a publicist, with backing from the Union of the Bessarabian Clergy. Called Raza ("The Ray") or Svet ("Light"), his newspaper drew negative attention from the Siguranța, which intervened to have the Union sack Cecan from his editorial position. Cecan was upset to note that Raza was being republished under new management, and resorted to recounting his version of events in another newspaper he issued for a period, called Khristianskaya Pobeda ("Christian Victory"). In 1931, he and Ioan Știucă revived the newspaper. This again irritated the sensibilities of mainstream Romanian nationalists by continuing to advocate in Russian; as Cecan noted in his rebuttal, there was a practical reason framing this decision: "We are proud that we know Russian almost as well as Romanian; [...] we are proud that we will be able to respond in the same language to mistakes, delusions, fabrications and attacks of the minority [Russian] press". Unpersuaded by such pleading, Metropolitan Gurie obtained that Raza be shut down after its first issue. That October, Cecan still addressed a meeting of the Bessarabian clergy in Russian, causing most of those present to leave the hall in protest.

=== Telegraf and Nazism ===
Cecan's pro-Catholic outlook, including his stance on papal infallibility, was openly criticized by conservative bishops—in particular, by Roman Ciorogariu of Oradea. In his polemic with Bishop Roman, made public in early 1933, Cecan insisted that a unified church would naturally be led by the popes. During that interval, he lamented the decline of Orthodoxy, concluding that: "Our Church no longer wields any influence upon society, upon the institutions of the State, or upon the life of the nation. It neither enlightens nor warms the souls of the faithful." In rendering his verdict, The Tablet saluted Cecan as an "earnest man and acute thinker". The letter to Bishop Roman also included a critique of atheism, which Cecan associated with Masonry, claiming that they acted under a "unified command". Also according to Cecan, Pope Pius XI was the herald of anti-Masonry resistance, much more powerful in this respect than the Orthodox bishops. He expanded on such topics in the March 3 issue of Viața Basarabiei, where he responded to the attacks of an unnamed Orthodox journalist. In this piece, he announced that he and other supporters of the "world united church" met and prayed weekly at Chișinău City Hall.

In early April, Gurie Grosu ordered an investigation of Cecan's activity, with the latter "accused of having carried out an intense propaganda in favor of uniting the Romanian and Catholic churches. He is likewise suspected of having defended communism." Cecan had retired from priesthood by April 11, complaining to Brînzeu that he was being formally investigated by the Romanian Synod for "Catholicizing" Bessarabia, but also noting that he had gained many followers. With assistance from his son-in-law Vasu, by then a former Senator of Romania, and with contributions from the public, he intended to set up a daily newspaper. Reportedly, some 300 priests, or a third of the Bessarabian clergy, had signed up his pro-Catholic platform.

Between May and November 1933, Protoiereus Cecan published in Chișinău the Russian-language Telegraf (also Bessarabsky Telegraf or Khristiansky Telegraf). The newspaper featured both his disdain toward Soviet policies (including his attacks on the Romanian–Soviet friendship society) and his calls on the Romanian state to afford more representation to, and protection of, the working classes; he claimed of the Romanian regime that it "outrages honest people who say despairingly: the Bolsheviks should get here sooner and put things in order." Telegraf was also an openly antisemitic tribune, with editorials in which Cecan himself called for "destroying the Jewish press", referring to Bessarabian Jews in particular as "leeches". The stance was praised by Irénée Merloz of the Romanian Assumptionists. According to Merloz: "the press was entirely Jewish and of a marked communist tendency, and so Father Jérémie Cecan's review, then his newspaper, also have roles in social defense and in the workers' and peasants' organization, as well as in the religious unification with Rome."

In June 1933, Adevărul, the left-wing central daily, explicitly asked the authorities, including Minister Pan Halippa, to ban Cecan's newspaper, noting that Cecan was the only signed owner—alongside a "committee of twelve". It noted that Telegraf was distinctly Russophilic in its non-Romanian content, and that it had called Halippa "Bessarabia's idiot". The discourse promoted by Khristianskaya Pobeda became the topic of a larger controversy when the Mayor of Chișinău, Dimitrie Bogos, drafted a citizens' letter which openly censured Cecan for his "right-wing extremism". The priest was immediately defended by a group of supporters, who noted that Bogos had no mandate to speak for the whole citizenry, and that he had issued no such protest against communists, even as they "carried out violent attacks in the city streets."

Though turning to far-right antisemitism, Cecan had initially derided Nazism: in a 1930 article for Khristianskaya Pobeda, he had disparaged Adolf Hitler by calling him a "German painter". By 1933, he was calling for a Romanian Hitler, as well as a Romanian Torquemada—appeals read by the Adevărul correspondent as alluding to the mass murder of Jews. Styled "independent national-Christian" in its original format, Telegraf became identifiable as a tribune of an openly Nazi group, the Romanian National Socialist Party (PNSR). The merger of platforms began in August 1933, when Cecan and an associate, Major Rotaru, wrote a piece favoring a "Singular Nationalist Front" comprising the PNSR, the National-Christian Defense League, and the Iron Guard. This alliance, they argued, would follow the model of the German Nazi Party by uniting Romanians "around the national Christian flag", "uproot[ing] the old, Jewified, rot of politicking". In September 1933, Cecan was also elected honorary president of the PNSR's Bessarabian branch. The same month, Telegraf published his musings on "National and International Socialism". As read by Șornikov, it was primarily a center-left piece, calling for an overhaul toward social ownership, and reviewing Nazism as a political expression of Christian socialism.

In October, Cecan spoke at the PNSR Congress in Chișinău, alleging that Bessarabia was suffering under "the vampiresque exploitation of Judaism". Elected to the party's executive leadership structure on that occasion, Cecan also served as leader of the PNSR cell in Chișinău, alongside Vasile Leidenius, publisher of Voskresenie newspaper. Over the following years, the party broke apart; most Bessarabian Nazis joined up with the Iron Guard, the more successful fascist movement. In November 1933, shortly before the parliamentary election of December, Cecan and Sergiu Florescu were put up as the two Iron Guard candidates in Lăpușna County; Cecan was also assigned the second list position in Orhei County. This announcement was closely followed by a government ban on Guard activities. One report of December 10 noted that, as part of this clampdown, Cecan had been taken into Chișinău police custody along with other "principal Guardists", such as Rodion Mantea and Trofim Colev. He was the only one released on December 16. As reported by Universul newspaper, such clemency "solidified the belief of Iron Guard members, namely that he had betrayed them." His case workers dismissed that claim, "while acknowledging that the defrocked priest had asked [them] for forgiveness in respect to his action, and had given assurances that he would never again repeat it." A month later, Cecan's son Alexander was himself arrested, charged with having embezzled Basarabia Bank, where he worked as a clerk. He was sentenced two a three-month jail term in January 1936.

=== Final years and execution ===
Shortly ahead of the election itself, Cecan Sr signed his name as an "Iron Guard member" to a manifesto asking sympathizers to embrace the National Liberal Party-Brătianu. In April 1934, during Orthodox Easter, he returned to preaching a rapprochement with the Catholics, urging his church bishops to renounce "outdated prejudice". In June, he addressed the Romanian Orthodox Church in an open letter, calling for a renewed work of religious instruction and "pastoral apostolate", which, he argued, would have prevented Romania from going the way of the Soviet Union. The letter also restated that "all the Christian world should form one unbreakable front" around the "invisible citadel" of Rome. Late that month, this polemical stance resulted in Cecan being cited before his Metropolis, to answer for his "propaganda against the Orthodox Church." His multiculturalism still found backers inside the ecclesiastical structures—in July, his associate Pavel Guciujna again attempted to raise the issue of multilingual publishing by the Union of the Bessarabian Clergy. The Greek-Catholic press also stood by Cecan when it came to his anti-Soviet politics: the official church magazine, Cuvântul Adevărului, welcomed Cecan's book Tainele și scopurile ascunse ale comunismului ("The Secrets and Covert Agenda of Communism"), published at Chișinău during the early 1930s.

In early 1934, Cecan was collecting funds for a "truly Russian newspaper", specifically intended as a new edition of Nashe Obyedineniye. At the time, he and Telegraf were again moving away from Nazism. In his articles for the paper, Cecan decried the victories of fascism—from the rise of Japanese statism and the assassination of Alexander Karađorđević, to German rearmament and the establishment of a Reich Labor Service; he also applauded the Romanian–Soviet rapprochement as a seed of "union with Russia". He had by then moved with his family to a small house in Chișinău, where he reportedly lived in poverty and relative isolation, his son-in-law having died in early March 1935. He and Sergiu Florescu were irregularly publishing Unirea Noastră—with the exact same title as Nashe Obyedineniye, but in Romanian, as this was the only form allowed by the Romanian censors. The two men sought to evade censorship and, in June 1934, put out an issue entirely in Russian, immediately confiscated by the Siguranța; in October, agents reported that the Unirea Noastră nameplate was still partly in Russian, and, as Șornikov notes, took active measures which resulted in Cecan going out of the publishing business. He soon revived Khristianskaya Pobeda, and, in 1935, managed to reopen Unirea Noastră without incident. The latter newspaper had become explicitly moderate in its political outlook. It hosted cartoons which mocked Hitler and the local fascists, including Octavian Goga and Alexandru Vaida-Voevod. During mid-to-late 1935, Cecan issued pamphlets and an article in Unirea Noastră, calling antisemites "sick" and defending Jewish assimilation.

A 1968 letter by Greek-Catholic bishop Ioan Ploscaru notes that Cecan was again defrocked, one final time, in 1935. According to Ploscaru, Cecan had by then also alienated his Catholic backers upon revelations about his past: "Our bishops sent one of our priests to Cecan's home, to learn about him. Once there, they discovered that the pro-unionist was a priest defrocked for his immoral lifestyle, that he was missing an eye, that he had wrestled the sacristan over some money, and that all of Bessarabia detested him. As soon as this report came out, we put a stop on all propaganda." By 1936, he had sued the Union of the Bessarabian Clergy for 40 thousand lei, which he claimed as back pay for his work at Raza. The regular and labor courts of Chișinău both declined competence, since the complaint did not involve a regular salary. On June 11, 1937, Cecan attended the Eparchy Assembly meeting. As reported by Universul, he had to be evicted by police after "provoking a scandal" during Halippa's address. At around the same time, his daughter Zinaida (or Zenaida) Vasu was engaged in a legal dispute with the Church over her late husband's house in Făgăraș.

Though still affiliated with the Iron Guard, Cecan eventually defected to Carol II's National Renaissance Front in 1938. His case against the Union of the Bessarabian Clergy appeared before the Court of Cassation in October of that year; it ruled that the labor court was in fact competent in the matter. The Catholic convert Teodosie Bonteanu, who visited Cecan in 1938, noted that he had stopped putting out Unirea Noastră, and had become an avid agriculturist. However, he had also been drawn into the Confraternity of Saint Benedict, an international ecumenist body founded by Serge Bolshakoff. By 1939, upon the resignation of Tikhon Lyashchenko, Orthodox Bishop of Berlin, Cecan became that group's president. In July of that year, Cecan announced his invention of an affordable seed drill which purportedly doubled yields, and which he designed especially for "small rural households."

In late June 1940, Bessarabia was occupied by the Soviet Union, and the NKVD swiftly arrested Cecan. His antisemitic articles and his PNSR membership were brought up against him by the government of the Moldavian SSR. On March 13, 1941, Kishinev Tribunal sentenced him to death as a "counterrevolutionary", citing Articles 54-11 and 54-13 of the Ukrainian Criminal Code. His execution was postponed while his activity as a Russophile was being reconsidered; some political figures intervened on his behalf with Lavrentiy Beria, the then-Deputy Premier. However, his cause became indefensible in June 1941, with a coordinated German–Romanian attack on the Soviet Union. On June 27, five days after the start of war, Cecan was secretly shot by the NKVD. Though some works suggest that this took place in Kishinev prison, NKVD files record his place of death as Tiraspol.

== Legacy ==
Cecan's fate was the subject of confusion in Romania: while some simply noted that he had gone missing, others acknowledged that "somewhere in Bessarabia, under a simple cross", he was "awaiting his resurrection". In August 1941, news of his killing were featured in Universul. By September 1941, responding to praise of Cecan in the Greek-Catholic press, Orthodox scholar Grigorie T. Marcu argued that none of the quotes from Cecan showed that he asked for submission to the pope. According to Marcu, Cecan was spuriously reinvented as a Catholic martyr.

In the Soviet Union, Cecan was chiefly remembered for his Nazism: in 1988, philosopher Alexandru Babii described him as a "vivid example of the link between clerical anti-communism and German fascism". His fate was only revisited after the dissolution of the Soviet Union, by the authorities of the new Republic of Moldova, and by intellectuals from all Romanian-speaking territories. In early 1994, Catholic theologian Eugen Pantea published an article which argued that Cecan had been correct in his activity as a church unionist. According to Pantea, the split between the revived, pro-Romanian, Metropolis of Bessarabia and a Russian Metropolis of Moldova proved that local Romanians were being targeted by a "Slavic steamroller". On December 21, 2001, Moldova's Supreme Court of Justice overturned the Soviet verdict against Cecan.
