= Leordoaia =

Leordoaia may refer to:

- Leordoaia, Hîrjauca Commune, Călăraşi district, Moldova
- Leordoaia, Hîrceşti Commune, Ungheni district, Moldova
