= Ieremia =

Ieremia is a name. It can be both a masculine given name and a surname. Notable people with this name include:

== As a given name ==
- Ieremia Cecan (1867–1941), a Romanian journalist
- Ieremia Movilă (c. 1555 – 1606), a prince of Moldavia
- Ieremia Tabai (born 1950), a Kiribati politician

== As a surname ==
- Alama Ieremia (born 1970), a New Zealand rugby union coach
- April Ieremia (born 1967), a New Zealand former netball player and TV host
- Dean Ieremia (born 2001), a Samoan rugby union player
- Mekeli Ieremia (born 1954), an American former football player
- Neil Ieremia, a New Zealand choreographer

== See also ==
- Ieremias Palladas (died 1659), a Greek painter
- Eremia, a Romanian name
- Jeremiah (given name), a popular name in many cultures
