= Hîrjauca Monastery =

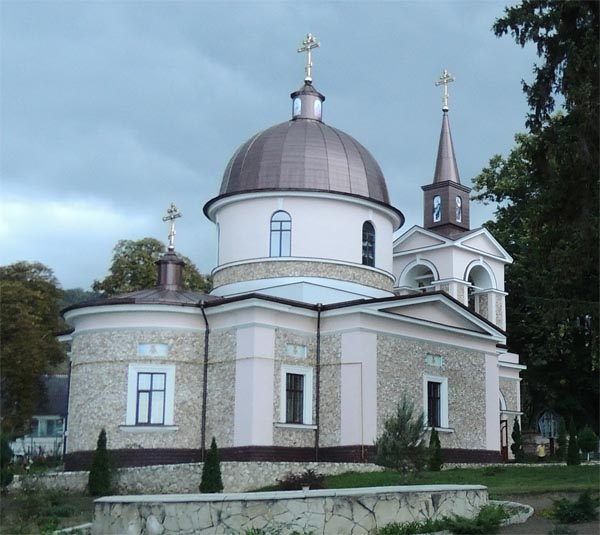
- Hîrjauca Monastery
- 47°19′07″N 28°14′16″E
- Location: Hîrjauca, Călărași District
- Country: Moldova
- Denomination: Eastern Orthodoxy

History
- Status: Monastery
- Founded: 1740

Architecture
- Style: Moldavian

Hîrjauca Monastery (Romanian: Mănăstirea Hîrjauca) is a monastery of Moldova, located north of the village of Hîrjauca, under the jurisdiction of the Diocese of Ungheni and Nisporeni of the Metropolis of Chișinău and All Moldova.

== History ==
According to the researcher Pavel Crușevan, on the site of the current monastery, an old man named Teodosie built a small prayer house for the fugitives who took shelter in Codri. Later, he was joined by two monks from the Neamț Monastery, the hieromonk Varsonufie and the monk Inochentie (originally from Călărași). To serve this new monastic community, the boyar Niculita built a small wooden church with a reed roof dedicated to the "Assumption of the Virgin". According to this version, the year of establishment of the hermitage is 1740. There are also two other versions regarding the foundation of the hermitage at Hîrjauca. The second one is the act of foundation of the monastery was mentioned in a document dated from 1784, an extract of the estates of the Bulat family, in which it is said that the monastery was founded by Mihul Bulat, keeper of the gate during the time of Mihai Racoviță. The year was not specified. In the third version, the hermitage already existed in 1642, when the razesi from Hirișeni founded a wooden church dedicated to the "Assumption of the Virgin Mary" on its territory.
