= Drujba =

Drujba may refer to:

- Hîrceşti, a commune in Ungheni district, Moldova
- Drujba, Vidin Province in Vidin Municipality, Bulgaria
