= Pavel Stratan =

Moldovan popular singer (born 1970)

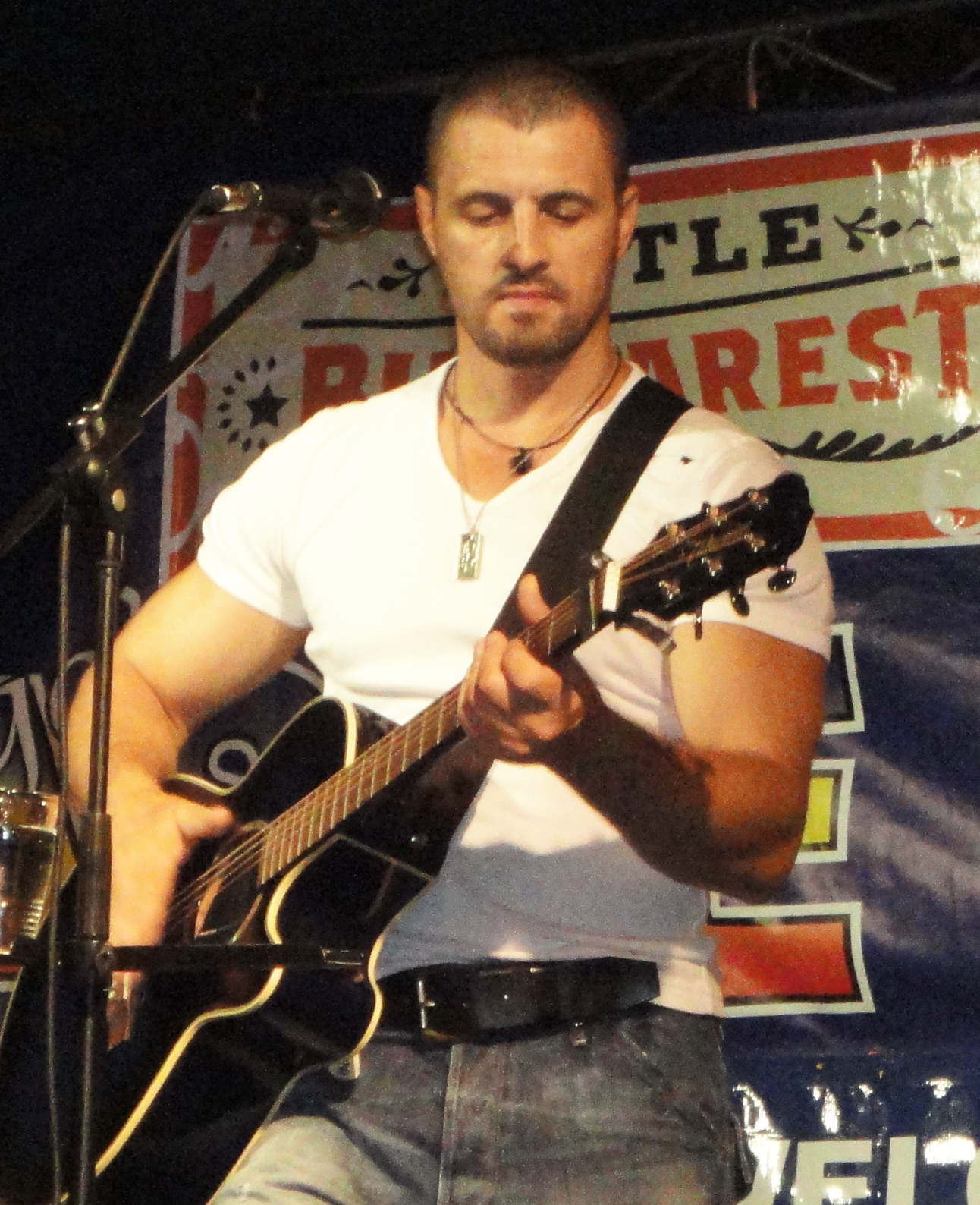
- Stratan performing in 2013

Background information
- Born: November 11, 1970 (age 55); Nişcani, Călărași, Moldovan SSR,USSR
- Genres: Folk, pop, hip hop
- Instruments: Vocals, guitar
- Years active: 2002–present
- Labels: Cat Music, Media Services
- Website: familiastratan.com

Pavel Stratan (born 11 November 1970) is a Moldovan popular singer. His first album, Amintiri din copilărie, was released in 2002.

== Early life ==
Pavel Stratan was born to Dumitru and Polixena Stratan in the village of Nişcani, Călărași, Moldovan SSR on 11 November 1970.

He first played the guitar on stage at school in 1977. He wrote his first lyrics in 1983, and in 1996, he had his first real show-business experience as a sleight-of-hand artist.

He graduated from the Academy of Music, Theatre, and Plastic Arts in Chişinău, Moldova.

== Career ==
In 2002, he launched his first album, Amintiri din copilărie (Childhood Memories), in Moldova. It went on to sell over 50,000 copies in Moldova. In 2004, it was released in Romania, where it sold very well, and where Stratan became widely known.

Under Cat Music, Stratan has since released three other albums: Amintiri din copilărie, vol. 2 in 2004, Amintiri din copilărie, vol. 3 in 2008, and Amintiri din copilărie, vol. 4 in 2011.

Stratan's music has been described as a mixture of folk, pop, and hip hop

== Personal life ==
Stratan is now living in Pipera, in the capital of Romania, Bucharest, with his wife Rodica, an engineer, daughter Cleopatra (born October 2002), and son, Cezar (born December 2008). The family moved to Romania from Moldova in 2011. His daughter entered the Guinness World Records as the youngest person ever to achieve commercial success at the age of three, with her song "Ghiţă", which became a No. 1 hit in Romania.

== Discography ==
- Amintiri din copilărie 2002
- Amintiri din copilărie, vol. 2 (2004)
- Amintiri din copilărie, vol. 3 (2008)
- Amintiri din copilărie, vol. 4 (2011)
