= Horodiște, Călărași =

Horodiște
- Village
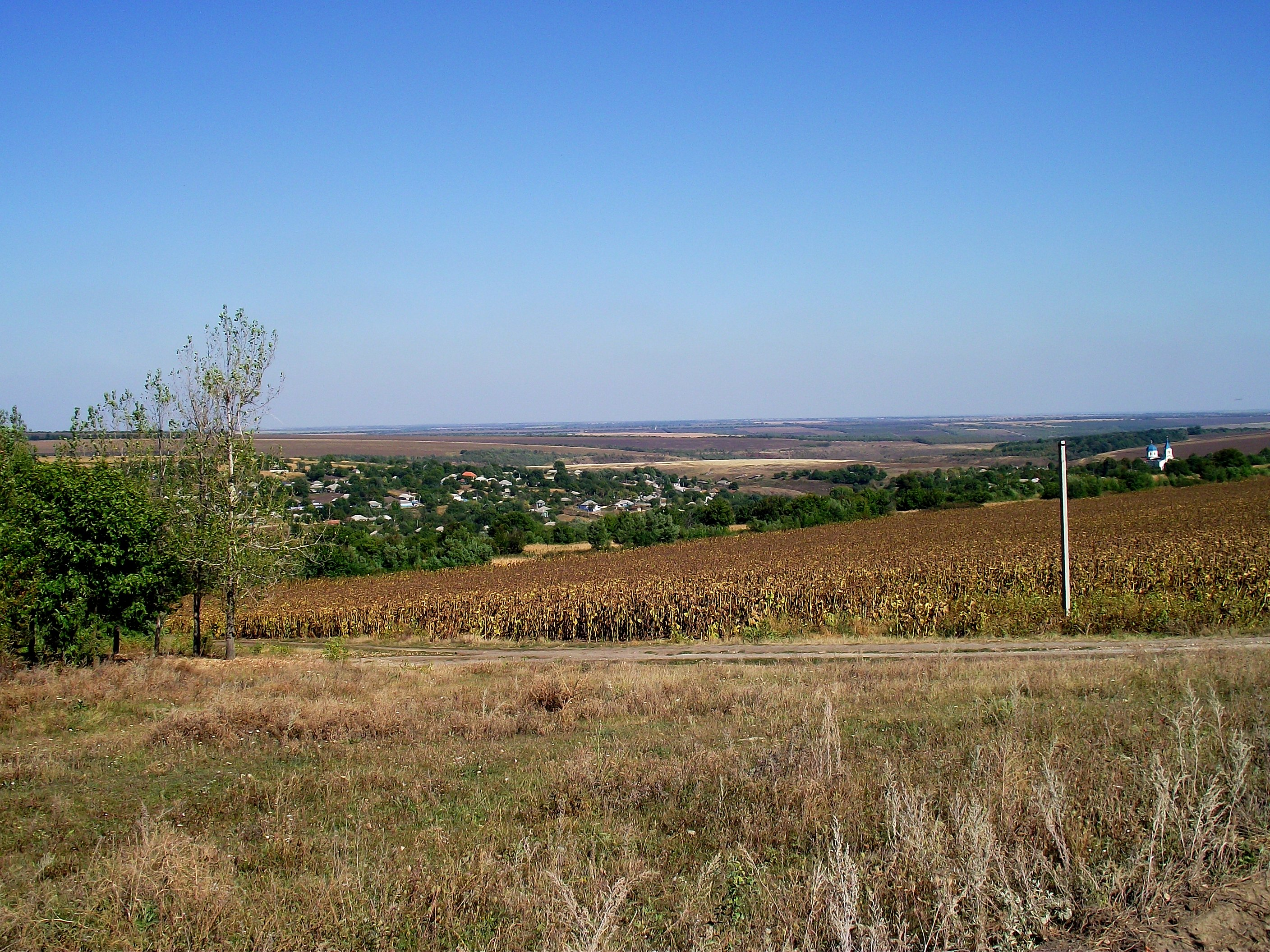

- Location in Moldova
- Coordinates: 47°12′37″N 28°15′1″E
- Country: Moldova
- District: Călărași District

Population (2014 census)
  - Total: 2,385
- Time zone: UTC+2 (EET)
  - Summer (DST): UTC+3 (EEST)

Horodiște is a village in Călărași District, Moldova.

== Notable people ==
- Vasile Țanțu
- Liliana Palihovici
