= Bahmut =

- Commune
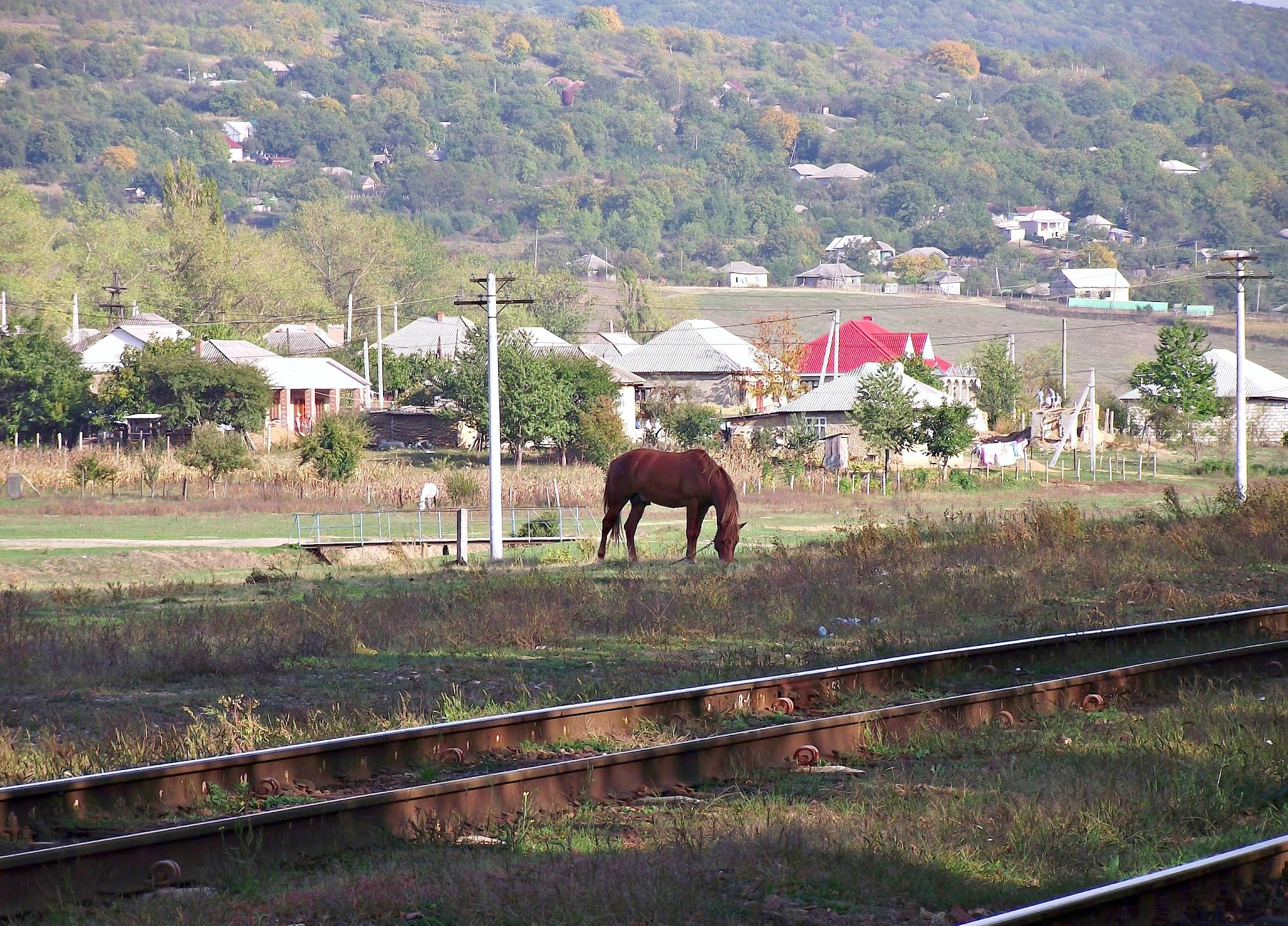

- Location within Moldova
- Coordinates: 47.3227777778°N 28.1141666667°E
- Country: Moldova
- District: Călărași

Population (2014)
  - Total: 1,670
- Time zone: UTC+2 (EET)
  - Summer (DST): UTC+3 (EEST)

Bahmut (Romanian pronunciation: [baxˈmut]; Moldovan Cyrillic: Бахмут) is a commune in Călărași District, Moldova. It is composed of two villages, Bahmut and Bahmut station.

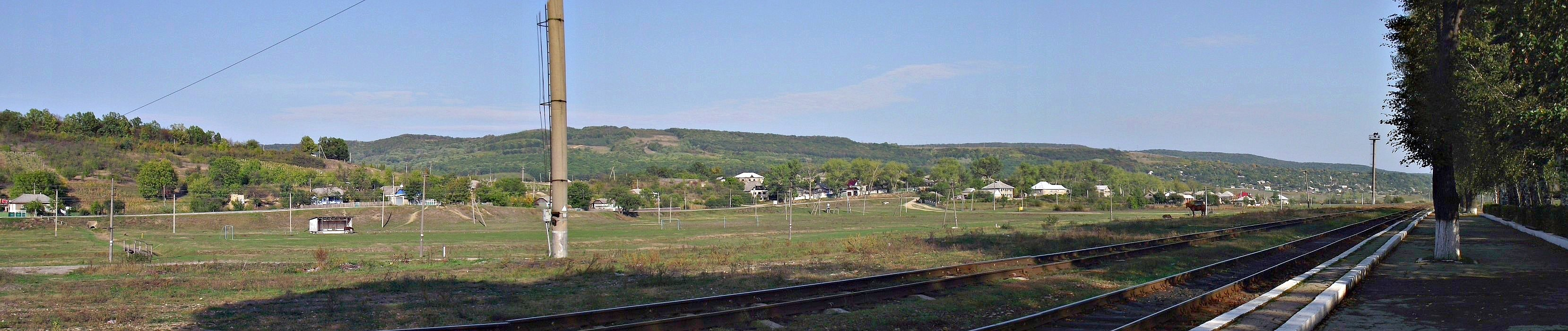
E58, Pojarna, Moldova – panoramio (9)
