= Hoginești =

- Village
- Location within Moldova
- Coordinates: 47.3744444444°N 28.3211111111°E
- Country: Moldova
- District: Călărași District

Government
  - Mayor: Constantin Poștaru (PLDM)

Population (2014 census)
  - Total: 1,572
- Time zone: UTC+2 (EET)
  - Summer (DST): UTC+3 (EEST)

Hoginești is a village in Călărași District, Moldova.
