= Amintiri din copilărie (album) =

Studio album by Pavel Stratan
- Released: 2002
- Genre: Folk, pop, hip hop

Pavel Stratan chronology
Amintiri din copilărie (2002)	Amintiri din copilărie, vol. 2 (2004)

Amintiri din copilărie (English: Childhood Memories) is the debut studio album of Moldovan popular singer Pavel Stratan. It was released in 2002 in Moldova and in 2004 in Romania. In Moldova, it sold over 50,000 copies. It also sold very well in Romania.

== Track listing ==
No.	Title	Length
1.	"Eu beu"	3:49
2.	"Luluța"	3:46
3.	"Așa-i că dese ori"	2:22
4.	"Tata"	3:28
5.	"Liliceii"	4:11
6.	"Vinul de primae"	3:17
7.	"La city"	4:14
8.	"În seara asta"	2:07
9.	"Țigara"	3:44
10.	"În satul nostru"	3:33
11.	"S-o-nsurat băieții"	3:33
12.	"Când eram mitel"	3:57
13.	"Eu beu (remix)"	4:37
