= Frumoasa, Călărași =

Frumoasa
- Village
- Location within Moldova
- Coordinates: 47.3294444444°N 28.4019444444°E
- Country: Moldova
- District: Călărași District

Government
  - Mayor: Gheorghe Movileanu (PLDM)

Population (2014 census)
  - Total: 610
- Time zone: UTC+2 (EET)
  - Summer (DST): UTC+3 (EEST)

Frumoasa is a village in Călărași District, Moldova.
