= Călărași District =

District in the Republic of Moldova

Coordinates: 47°15′N 28°20′E

Călărași District Raionul Călărași
- District (Raion)
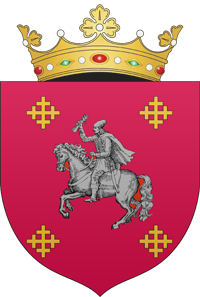
- Flag Coat of arms

- Country: Republic of Moldova
- Administrative center (Oraș-reședinţă): Călărași
- Established: 2002

Government
  - Raion President: Nicolae Drăgănel (PAS, 2023)

Area
  - Total: 753.5 km^{2} (290.9 sq mi)

Population (2024)
  - Total: 43,864
  - Density: 58.21/km^{2} (150.8/sq mi)
- Time zone: UTC+2 (EET)
  - Summer (DST): UTC+3 (EEST)
- Area code: +373 44
- Car plates: CL
- Website: www.calarasi.md

Călărași (Romanian pronunciation: [kələˈraʃʲ]) is a district (Romanian: raion) in the centre of Moldova, with the administrative headquarters in Călărași. As of the 2024 Census, its population was 43,864.

== History ==
The district territory is inhabited since Paleolithic, 50–40,000 years ago. Settlements with the earliest documentary attestation of the district are: Horodiște, Pitușca, and Sadova, they are certified in 1420. During the component was in the Principality of Moldova (1359–1812), the current Călărași territory held by the Orhei - Lăpușna County. After dividing the land Orhei - Lapusna in two separate counties, some localities have passed Orhei County and the other part Lăpușna County. From the 16th through the 18th centuries, the district developed economically (trade, wine), culturally (to build monasteries, Frumoasa, Hârbovăţ and Răciula) and grew in population. After the Treaty of Bucharest, Basarabia is occupied by the Russian Empire at this time there is an intense russification of the native population. In 1918 after the collapse of the Russian Empire, Basarabia united with the motherland Romania but for a short time (1918–1940, 1941–1944). In 1940 after the Molotov–Ribbentrop Treaty, the territory between the Prut and Nistru is busy again this time the USSR. In 1991 as a result of the proclamation of Independence of Moldova, part of the Ungheni County (1991–2003), and in 2003 became administrative unit of Moldova.

== Geography ==
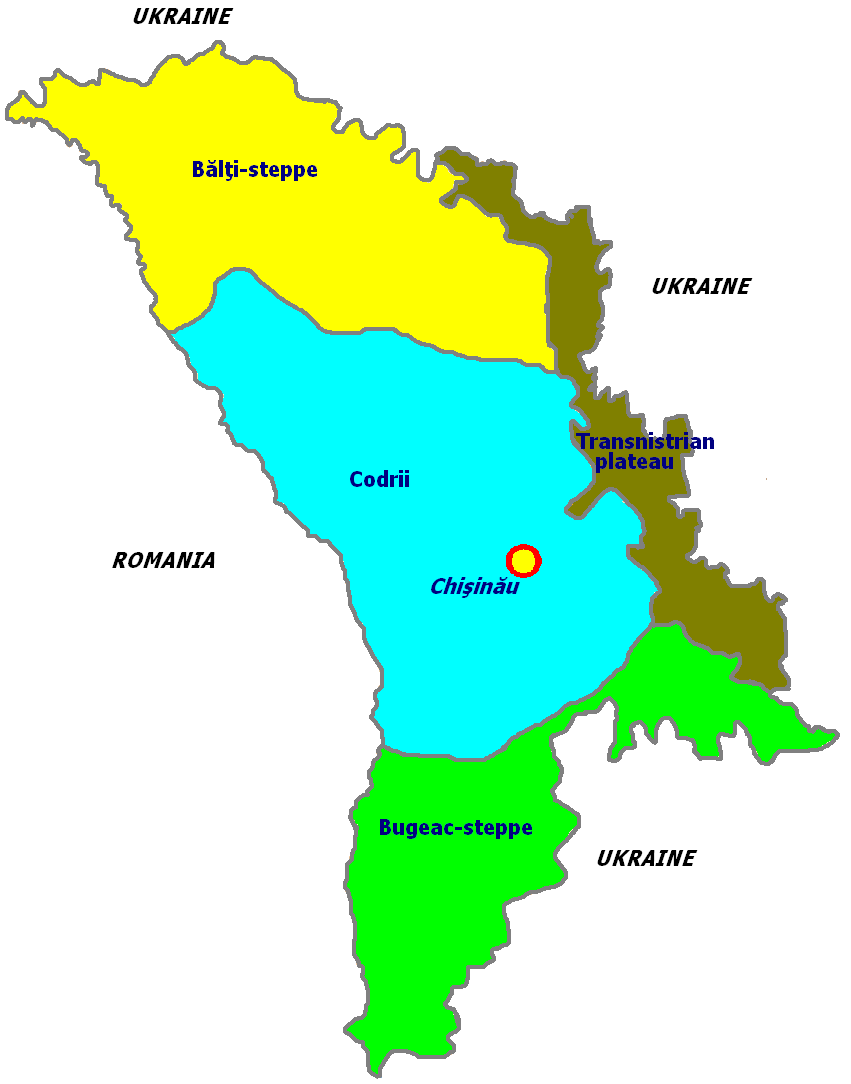
Călăraşi district situated in geomorphological area Codri

Calarasi District is located in central part of Moldova. It borders with Teleneşti District in the north, east Orhei District, Străşeni District in south, south-west Nisporeni District and Ungheni District in west. Very rugged terrain, crossed the slopes with different degrees of tilt conditioning Central Moldavian Plateau, and is located in Codri. Chernozem soil in valleys, and brown soil on the plateau. Maximum altitude in the district is 400 meters, the rate reached in the south-western part of district.

=== Climate ===
The climate is temperate-continental. The average air temperature is 9 °C (48 °F). Average January temperature −5 °C (23 °F) and in July 21 °C (70 °F). Yearly precipitation] 550–650 mm. Average wind speed 4–6 m/s.

=== Fauna ===
Fauna characteristic of the so animals such as: fox, wild cat, marten, rabbit, squirrel, deer, wild boar, wolf, red deer and others and the world of birds may be mentioned: blackbird, pigeon, jay, finch, eagle, woodpecker and other.

=== Flora ===
Forests occupy 30.7% of district territory, dominate species: hornbeam, beech, ash, elm, oak, white, lime, etc. In strips of forest are encountered: horn, hawthorn, bat, maples and other.

=== Plaiul Fagului ===
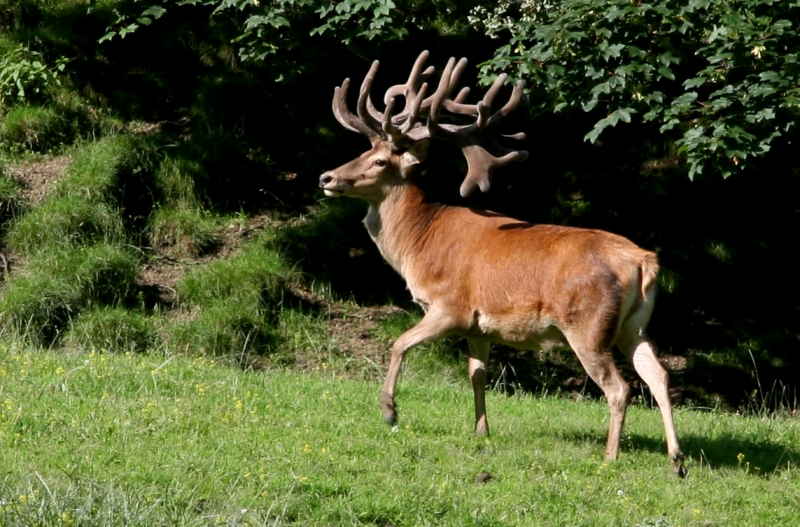
Red deer in the scientific reserve Plaiul Fagului

State Nature Reserve "Plaiul Fagului" was created on March 12, 1992 for the conservation, regeneration, environmental recovery, study one of the most picturesque and representative forest ecosystems in the Codri. The total area of reserve is 5642 ha, of which forests occupy 4639 ha (82.2%). The territorial-administrative structure includes 5387 hectares of natural tree, beech formations including 272 ha (4.8%), ash 1163 ha (20.6%), sessile oak 1039 ha (18.4%), lime 170 ha (3.1%) other species, 169 ha (3.0%). Flora includes 909 species, including 645 species of vascular plants, 151 species of fungi, 48 species of lichens, 65 species of moss. Fauna: As mentioned Dimitrie Cantemir, in this land dwelling deer, bears, reindeer, martens, wolves, wild boar. Arable land expansion has contributed significantly to the reduction of forested area, the numerical reduction plants and animals. Uncontrolled hunting disappearance of conditioned bear, deer, lynx, wolf, black grouse etc.

=== Rivers ===
District is located in the Nistru river basin, a tributary that crosses the district are: Bic, Ichel and Cula. Most lakes are of natural origin, but are rich in fish.

== Wine production ==
This Călărași District is known for its red wine, white wine, and cognac. While Moldova was a part of the Soviet Union, its wines were known throughout the USSR.

== Administrative subdivisions ==
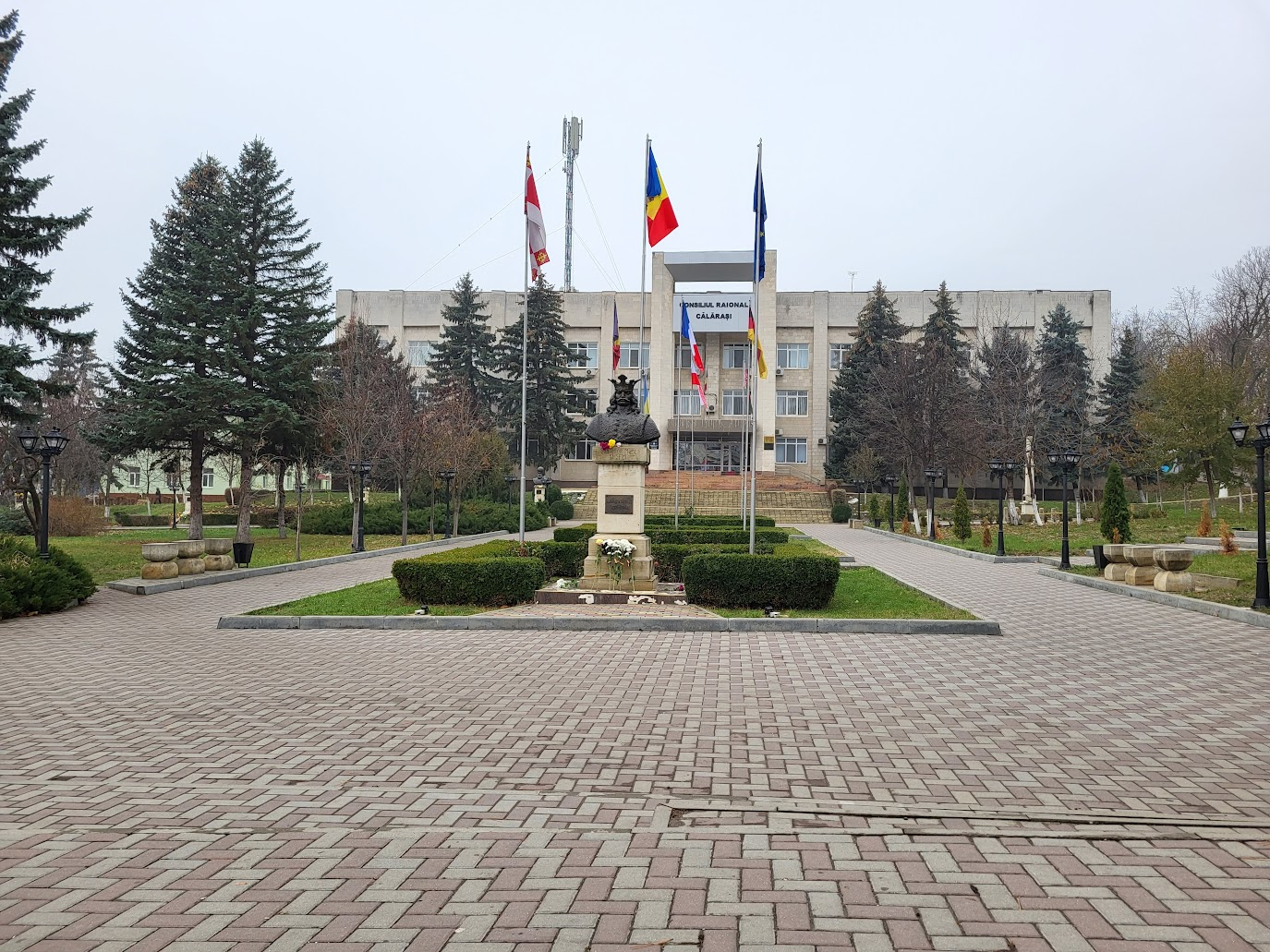
District administration building

- Localities: 54
  - Administrative center: Călăraşi
    - Cities: Călăraşi
      - Villages: 23
        - Communes: 30

== Demographics ==
As of the 2024 Census, the district population was 43,864 of which 21.5% urban and 78.5% rural populatio

=== Ethnic groups ===
Ethnic group	% of total
Moldovans *	85.7
Romanians *	10.0
Ukrainians	2.7
Russians	0.5
Romani	0.9
Gagauz	0.0
Bulgarians	0.0
Other	0.1
Undeclared	0.0

Footnote: * There is an ongoing controversy regarding the ethnic identification of Moldovans and Romanians.

=== Religion ===
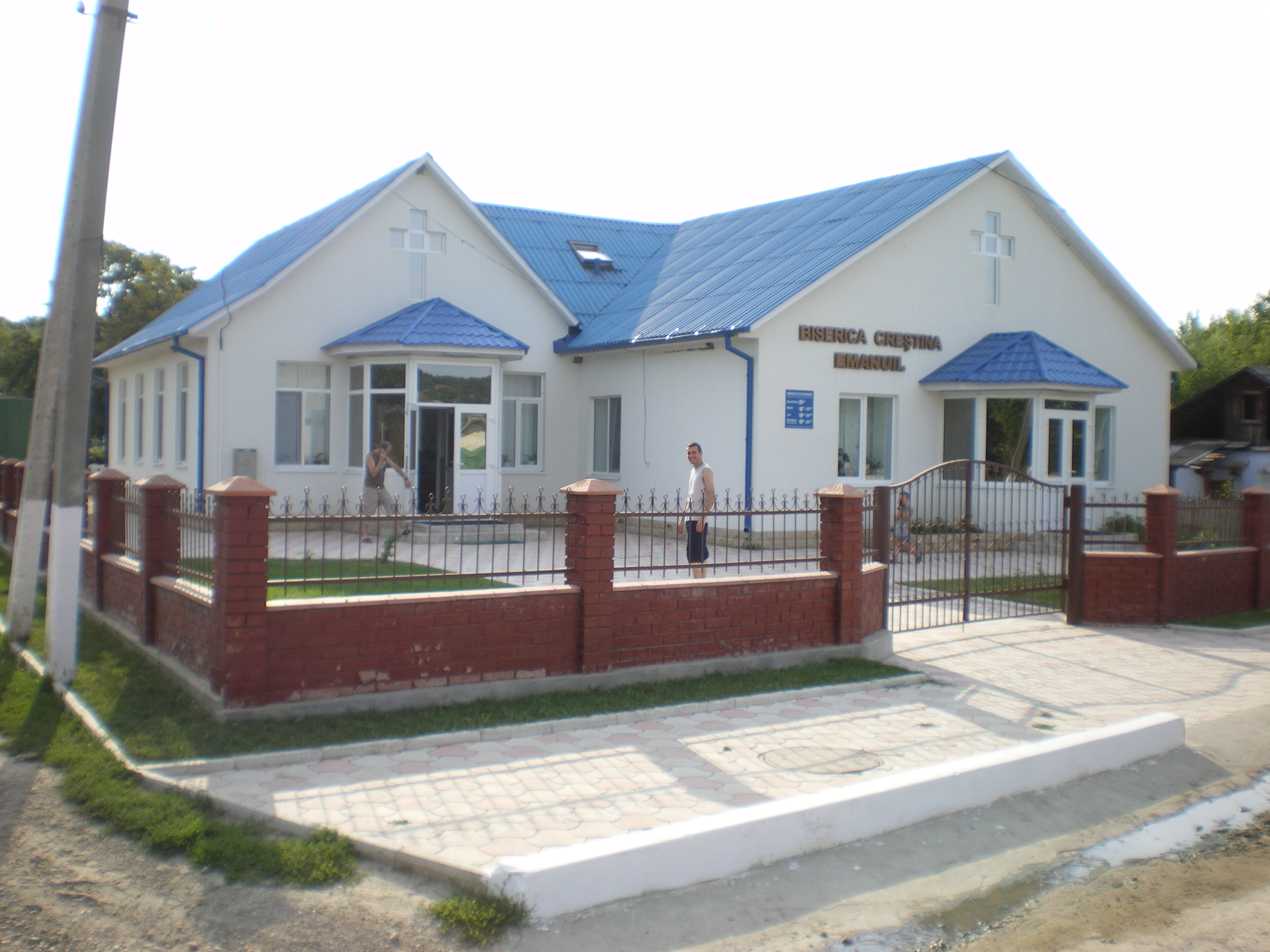
Baptist church in Bravicea

- Christians - 99.3%
  - Orthodox Christians - 97.5%
  - Protestant - 1.8%
  - Catholics - 0.0%
- Other - 0.1%
- No Religion - 0.3%
- Not declared - 0.2%

== Economy ==
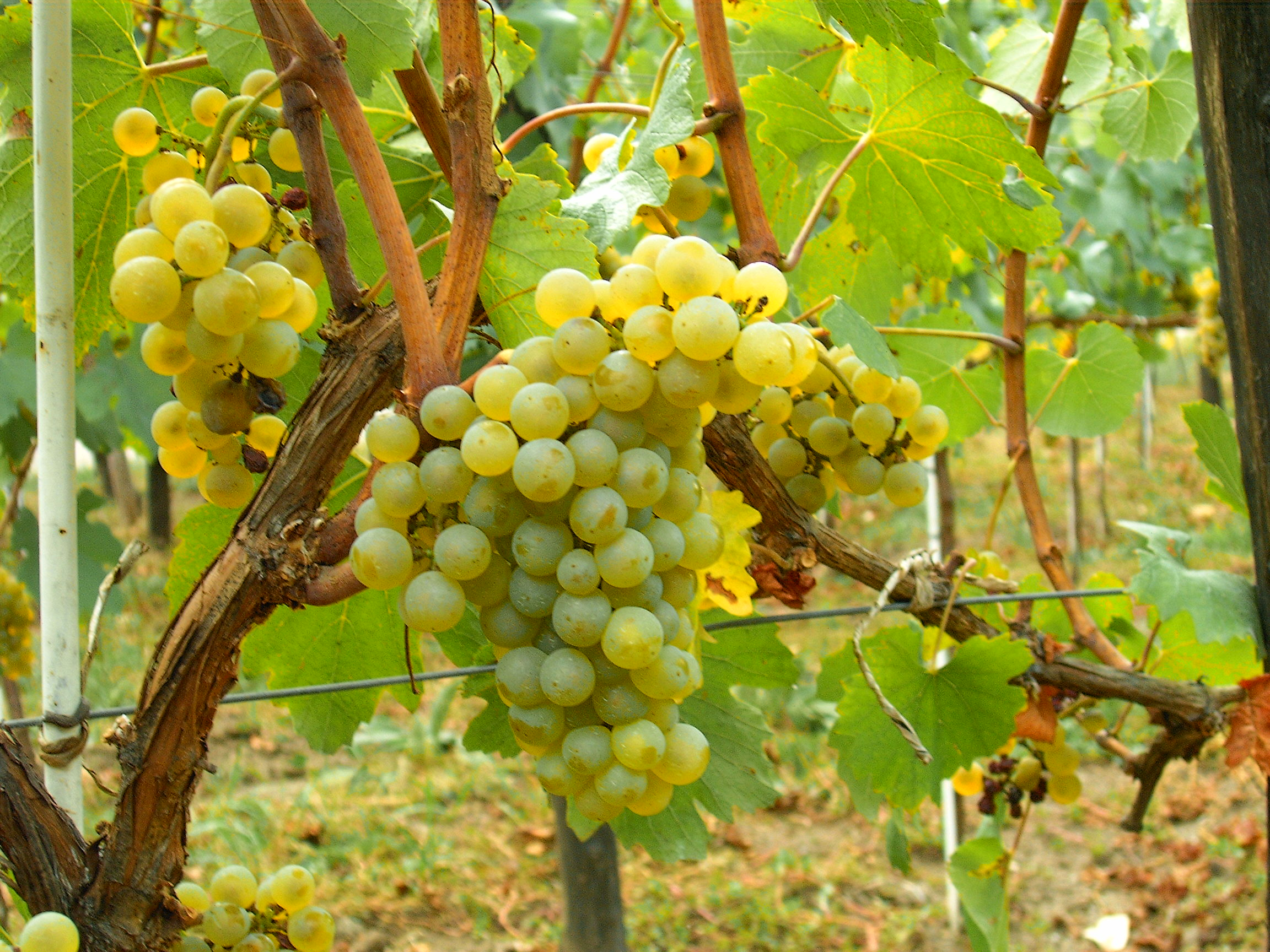
Viticulture an important sector of agriculture district

The district recorded a total of 21,200 enterprises, of which individual enterprises 673 units, 19,792 units farms, enterprises with the legal person status 800. SMEs constitute about 99% of all enterprises. Here is a winery and a cognac factory is one of the first in Moldova and other enterprises in the food industry (canned food, sugar, dairy products). Food industry (dairy) there is a factory that produces dairy products quality first. Agricultural land - 25 801 ha (34.1%), including arable land - 13,323 ha (16.7%), orchards - 3138 ha (4.1%), vine - 6020 ha (8.0%), pastures - 7384 ha (9.8%) other - 394.7 ha (0.5%). Main crops: cereals (wheat, oats), corn, sunflower, rapeseed and soy.

== Education ==
In Calarasi district works: 31 kindergartens, 34 schools, a multipurpose school, college and a special auxiliary school. Total number of students: in schools - 8176 students, in professional schools versatile - 269 students, college teaching "Alexandru cel Bun" 553 students.

== Politics ==
Calarasi district in terms of political support center-right parties. AEI enjoys a major support. PCRM here usually get poor results, the last three elections is a constant fall.

During the last three elections AEI had an increase of 68.9%

Parliament elections results
Year	AEI	PCRM
2010	68.13% 23,517	25.81% 8,910
July 2009	63.67% 21,516	32.10% 10,849
April 2009	43.33% 13,925	43.39% 13,947

=== Elections ===
Summary of 28 November 2010 Parliament of Moldova election results in Călăraşi District
Parties and coalitions	Votes	%	+/−
Liberal Democratic Party of Moldova	12,364	35.82	+18.23
Party of Communists of the Republic of Moldova	8,910	25.81	−6.29
Liberal Party	5,602	16.23	−3.48
Democratic Party of Moldova	4,252	12,32	+2.30
Party Alliance Our Moldova	1,299	3.76	−12.59
European Action Movement	368	1.07	+1.07
Other Party	1,736	4.99	+0.76
Total (turnout 56.08%)	34,807	100.00	

== Culture ==
The district works: 37 houses and cultural centers, 42 libraries, 7 museums, three art schools. In total the district works, 103 artistic groups, including 23 as "model".

== Health ==
The district operates: Călăraşi district hospital with 200 beds general fund, a Center of Family Physicians, 4 health centers, 27 family doctor's offices, three offices Health, 35 pharmaceutical subsidiaries.

== Tourism ==
- Agrotouristic "Honey House" - Răciula
- Mansions of noblemen Malski and Russo 19th century (Bahmut, Păuleşti)
- Geopaleontological natural monument "Cemetery horses" (2 ha)
- Sanatorium Codru - Hîrjauca
- The four monasteries located in a cross (Frumoasa, Răciula, Hîrjauca, Hîrbovăţ)
- The oldest winery and brandy from Moldova (Călăraşi Divin)
- Unique wooden churches in Moldova (Mandra, Hîrjauca, Horodiște, Păuleşti, Hogineşti)
- Vestiges of ancient fortresses Getae of a ground (4th–3rd century BC) of Horodiște

== Personalities ==
- Iurie Colesnic - Politician (PL)
- Mihai Petric - Painter
- Pavel Stratan - Singer and songwriter of folk music
- Andrew Rayel - Producer and DJ
- Sigmund Mogulesko - Singer, actor and composer
- Igor Dodon - Politician and President
