= Răciula =

- Commune
- Location within Moldova
- Coordinates: 47.3058333333°N 28.3538888889°E
- Country: Moldova
- District: Călărași District

Population (2014)
  - Total: 2,269
- Time zone: UTC+2 (EET)
  - Summer (DST): UTC+3 (EEST)

Răciula is a commune in Călărași District, Moldova. It is composed of two villages, Parcani and Răciula.
