= Călărași, Moldova =

Town in Călărași District, Moldova

Călărași Kalarash, Tuzora
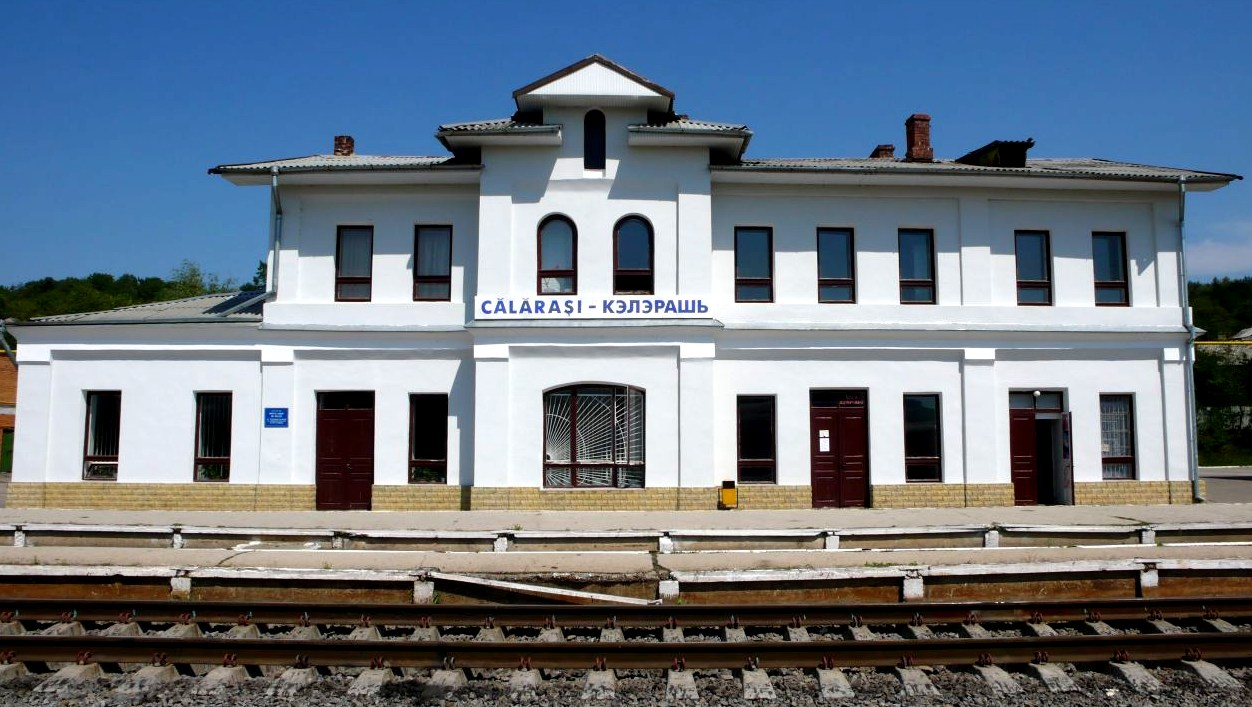
- Călărași railway station

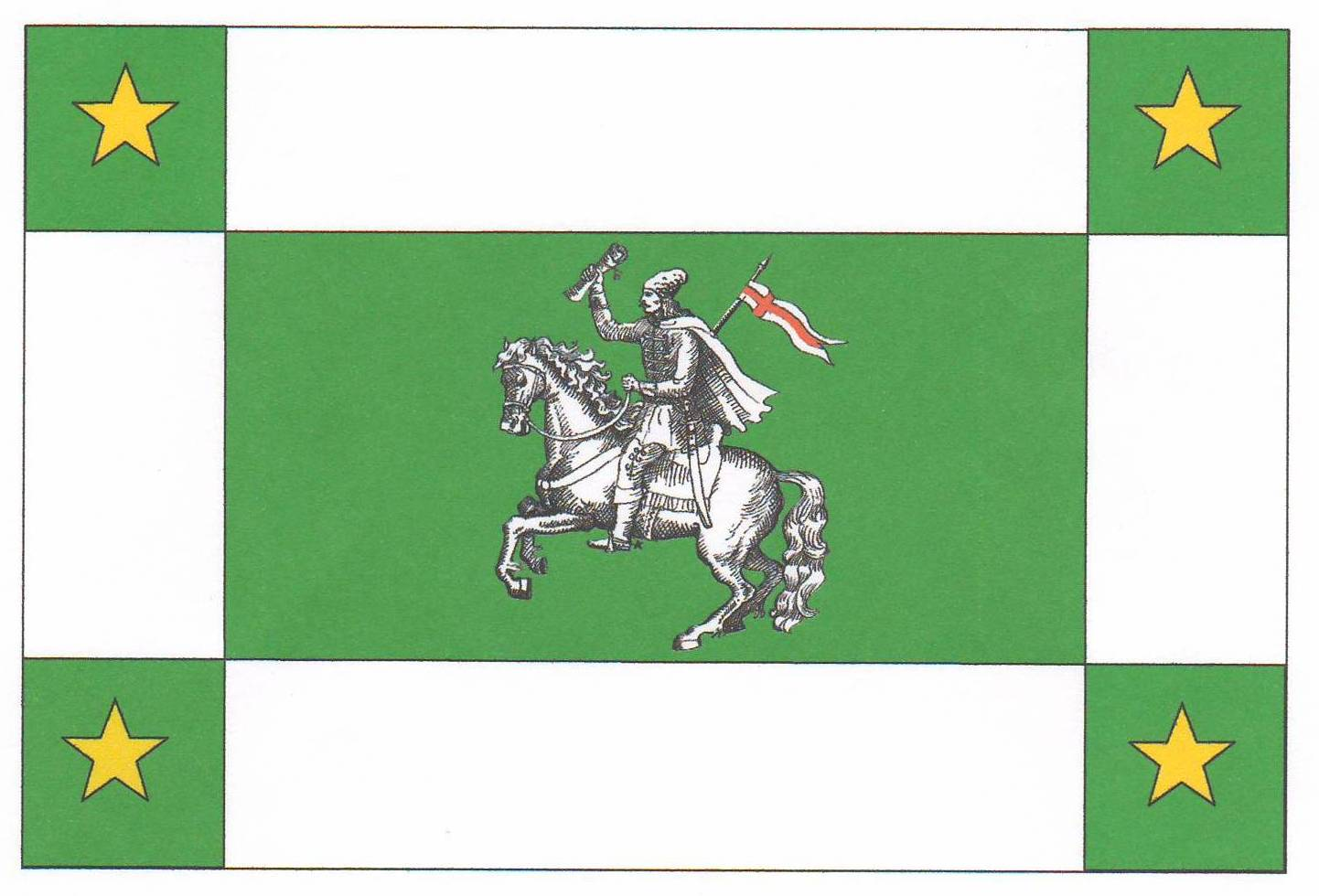
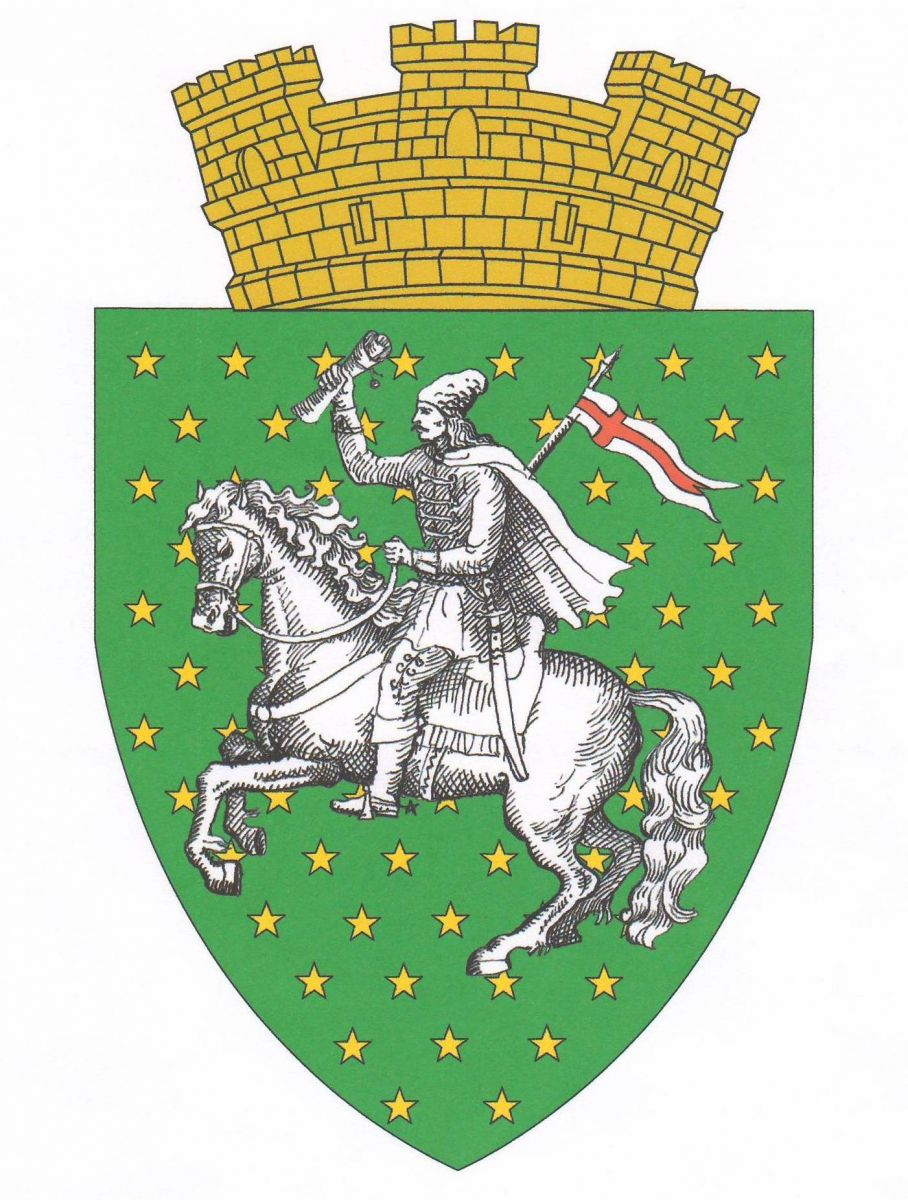
- Flag Coat of arms

- Location within Moldova
- Coordinates: 47°15′N 28°18′E
- Country: Moldova
- County: Călărași District

Area
  - Total: 423 km^{2} (163 sq mi)

Population (2014)
  - Total: 10,808
  - Density: 25.6/km^{2} (66.2/sq mi)
- Time zone: UTC+2 (EET)
  - Summer (DST): UTC+3 (EEST)
- Climate: Dfb

Călărași (Romanian pronunciation: [kələˈraʃʲ]) is a town in Moldova, founded in 1848.

Long ago, the word "călărași" meant "horsemen" (today the word is "călăreți"). The name of Călărași was inspired by a legend which tells that once, when Stephen III of Moldavia fought the Ottomans, he ordered a regiment of horsemen to stand guard. They fought the Ottomans, sacrificed themselves and, finally, won the battle.

Călărași was historically a Hassidic Jewish town: 4,593, or 89% of the population, were Jewish occupants in 1897. In 1905, 60 Jews were killed, 300 were injured and over 200 houses were burned down as part of the wave of Russian pogroms. Many of the survivors fled to nearby Chișinău or emigrated to Romania, Austria, Palestine and the United States. In 1930, 3,631 residents (76% of the population) were Jewish. The Jewish community had welfare organizations, a hospital, a Talmud Torah and a library among other community facilities.

In 2018, Dumitru Grosei released an ethnographic documentary in Romanian called "Călărași – A Land by the Gate of Heaven" focused on the town's cultural history and folklore.

The city is the administrative center of Călărași District; it also administers one village, Oricova.

== Demographics ==
According to the 2014 census, the population of Călărași amounted to 10,808 inhabitants, a decrease compared to the previous census in 2004, when 14,660 inhabitants were registered. Of these, 5,105 were men and 5,703 were women.

Ethnic composition of Călărași (2014)
1. Moldovans* (78.1%)
2. Romanians (15.7%)
3. Russians (2.76%)
4. Ukrainians (2.36%)
5. Others (1.13%)
:Linguistic composition of Călărași (2014)
1. Moldovan* (51.8%)
2. Romanian (41.1%)
3. Russian (5.44%)
4. Ukrainian (0.90%)
5. Other (0.72%)

Footnotes:

* There is an ongoing controversy regarding the ethnic identification of Moldovans and Romanians.

* Moldovan language is one of the two local names for the Romanian language in Moldova. In 2013, the Constitutional Court of Moldova interpreted that Article 13 of the constitution is superseded by the Declaration of Independence, thus giving official status to the name Romanian.

Historical population
Year	Pop.	±%
1959	5,725	—
1970	13,918	+143.1%
1979	16,207	+16.4%
1989	18,326	+13.1%
2004	14,660	−20.0%
2014	10,808	−26.3%

== International relations ==
=== Twin towns – Sister cities ===
Călărași is twinned with:

- Călărași, Romania
