= Hîrbovăț =

- Commune and village
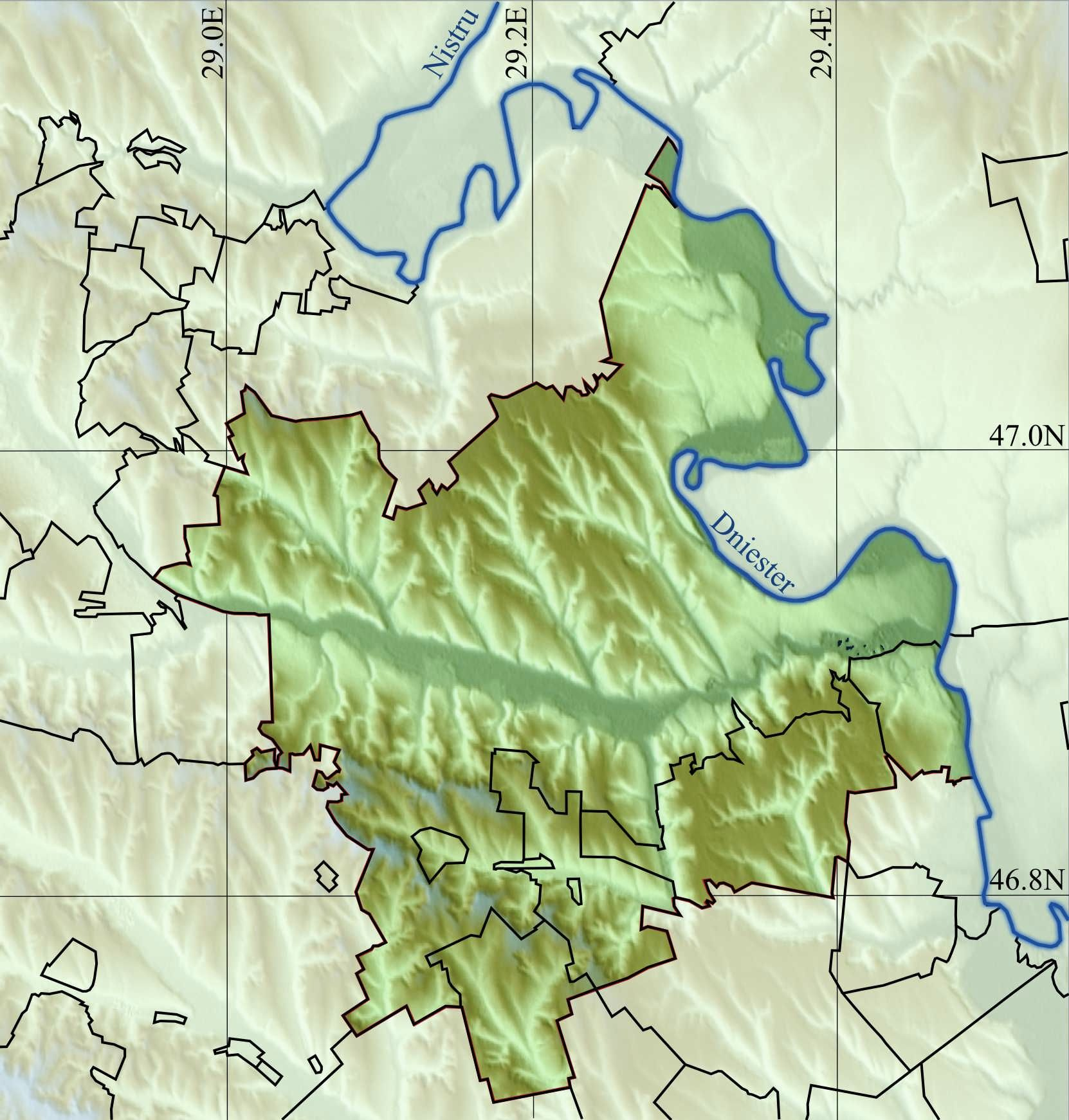
- Location within Anenii Noi District Location within Moldova
- Coordinates: 46°51′N 29°21′E
- Country: Moldova
- District: Anenii Noi District

Population (2014 census)
  - Total: 5,194
- Time zone: UTC+2 (EET)
  - Summer (DST): UTC+3 (EEST)

Hîrbovăț is a village in the Anenii Noi District of Moldova.
