= Păulești, Călărași =

Păulești
- Village
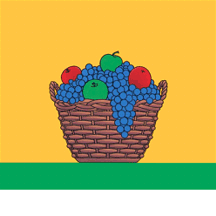
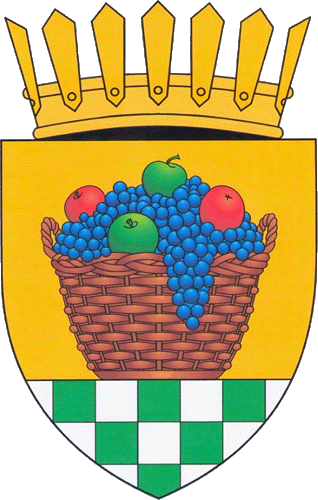
- Flag Coat of arms

- Location within Moldova
- Coordinates: 47.2677777778°N 28.3722222222°E
- Country: Moldova
- District: Călărași District

Government
  - Mayor: Ion Prunici (PL)

Population (2014 census)
  - Total: 843
- Time zone: UTC+2 (EET)
  - Summer (DST): UTC+3 (EEST)

Păulești is a village in Călărași District, Moldova.
