= Ghiduleni =

- Commune
- Location within Moldova
- Coordinates: 47.61°N 28.7425°E
- Country: Moldova
- District: Rezina District

Government
  - Mayor: Ciubotaru Liviu (alegeri locale 2015)

Population (2014)
  - Total: 1,041
- Time zone: UTC+2 (EET)
  - Summer (DST): UTC+3 (EEST)

Village of Roșcanii de Sus

Ghiduleni is a commune in Rezina District, Moldova. It is composed of three villages: Ghiduleni, Roșcanii de Jos and Roșcanii de Sus.
