= Eremia =

Eremia is a Romanian name that may refer to

Given name

- Eremia Grigorescu (1863–1919), Romanian artillery general

Surname

- Alexandra Eremia (born 1987), Romanian artistic gymnast
- Alina Eremia (born 1993), Romanian singer, TV personality and actress
