= Nișcani =

- Village
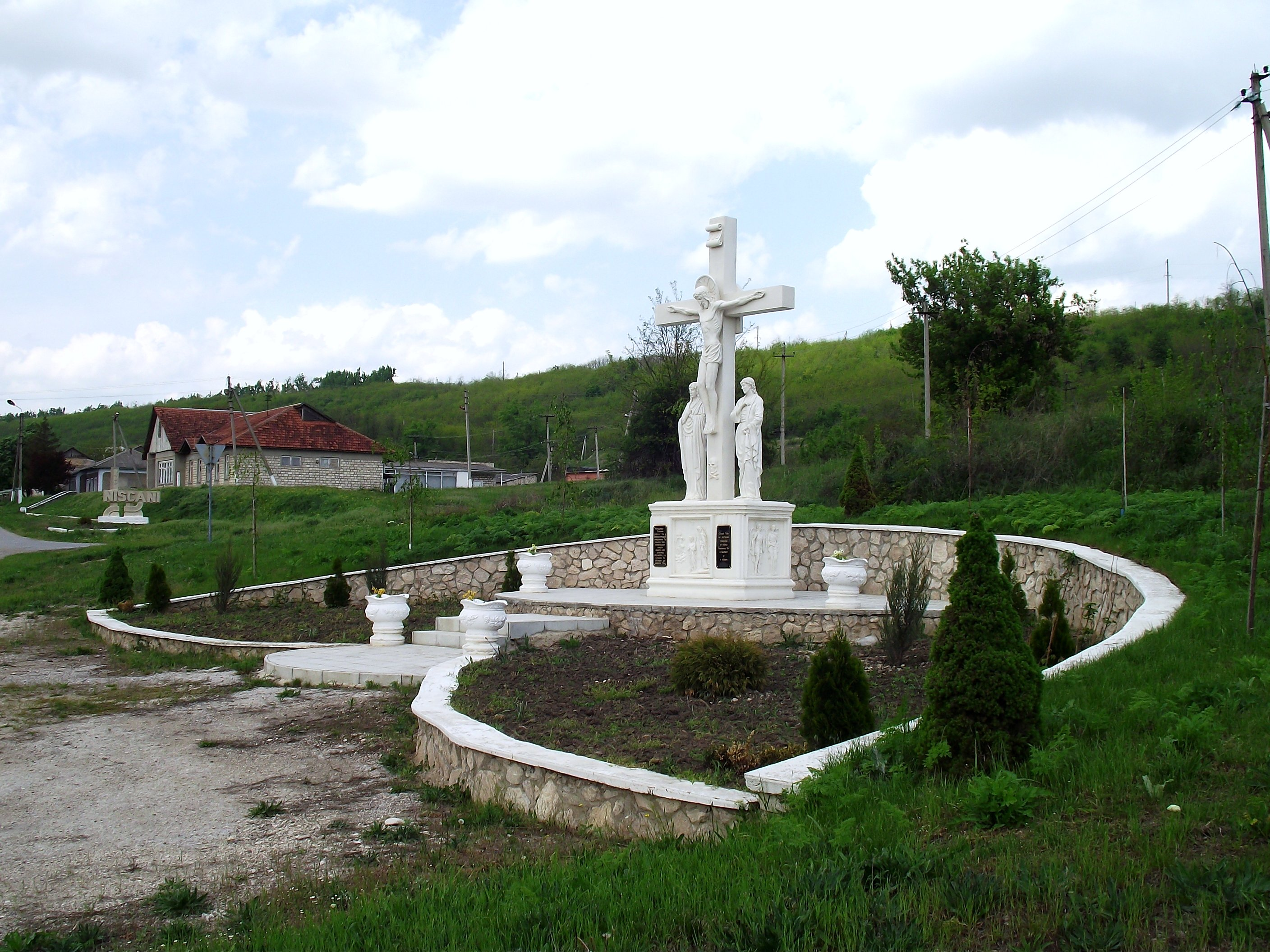
- L409, Moldova

- Location within Moldova
- Coordinates: 47.2680555556°N 28.3458333333°E
- Country: Moldova
- District: Călărași District

Government
  - Mayor: Petru Sorici (PAS)

Population (2014 census)
  - Total: 1,478
- Time zone: UTC+2 (EET)
  - Summer (DST): UTC+3 (EEST)

Nișcani is a village in Călărași District, Moldova.

== Demographics ==
According to the 2014 Moldovan census, Nișcani had a population of 1,478 residents. The village covers an area of 18.4 km², resulting in a population density of approximately 80.3 inhabitants per square kilometer as of the 2014 census. Between 2004 and 2014, Nișcani experienced a population decline of about 2.3%.

The gender distribution was relatively balanced, with 724 males (49%) and 754 females (51%). In terms of age structure, 15.1% of residents were children aged 0–14, 72.7% were of working age (15–64), and 12.2% were aged 65 and over. The entire population lived in rural areas.

Most residents (98.6%) were born in Moldova, with small numbers born in the European Union (0.4%) and other Commonwealth of Independent States countries (0.7%). Ethnically, the population was composed primarily of Moldovans (73.5%), followed by a significant Romanian minority (26.0%). Regarding native language, 59.3% of residents reported Moldovan as their mother tongue, while 40.1% identified Romanian as their native language. Virtually the entire population identified as Orthodox.

== Administration and local government ==
Nișcani is governed by a local council composed of nine members. The most recent local elections, in November 2023, resulted in the following composition: 7 councillors from the Party of Action and Solidarity and 2 councillors from the Party of Socialists of the Republic of Moldova. The Chance Political Party also ran, but didn't receive enough votes to select councillors. In the same elections, the candidate from the Party of Action and Solidarity, Petru Sorici, was elected as mayor, winning all of the vote.
