= Hîrjauca =

- Commune
- Location within Moldova
- Coordinates: 47.3269444444°N 28.2216666667°E
- Country: Moldova
- District: Călărași District

Population (2014)
  - Total: 2,505
- Time zone: UTC+2 (EET)
  - Summer (DST): UTC+3 (EEST)

Hîrjauca is a commune in Călărași District, Moldova with 2,877 inhabitants (2004 census). It is composed of four villages: Hîrjauca, Leordoaia, Mîndra and Palanca.
