= Hîrcești =

- Commune
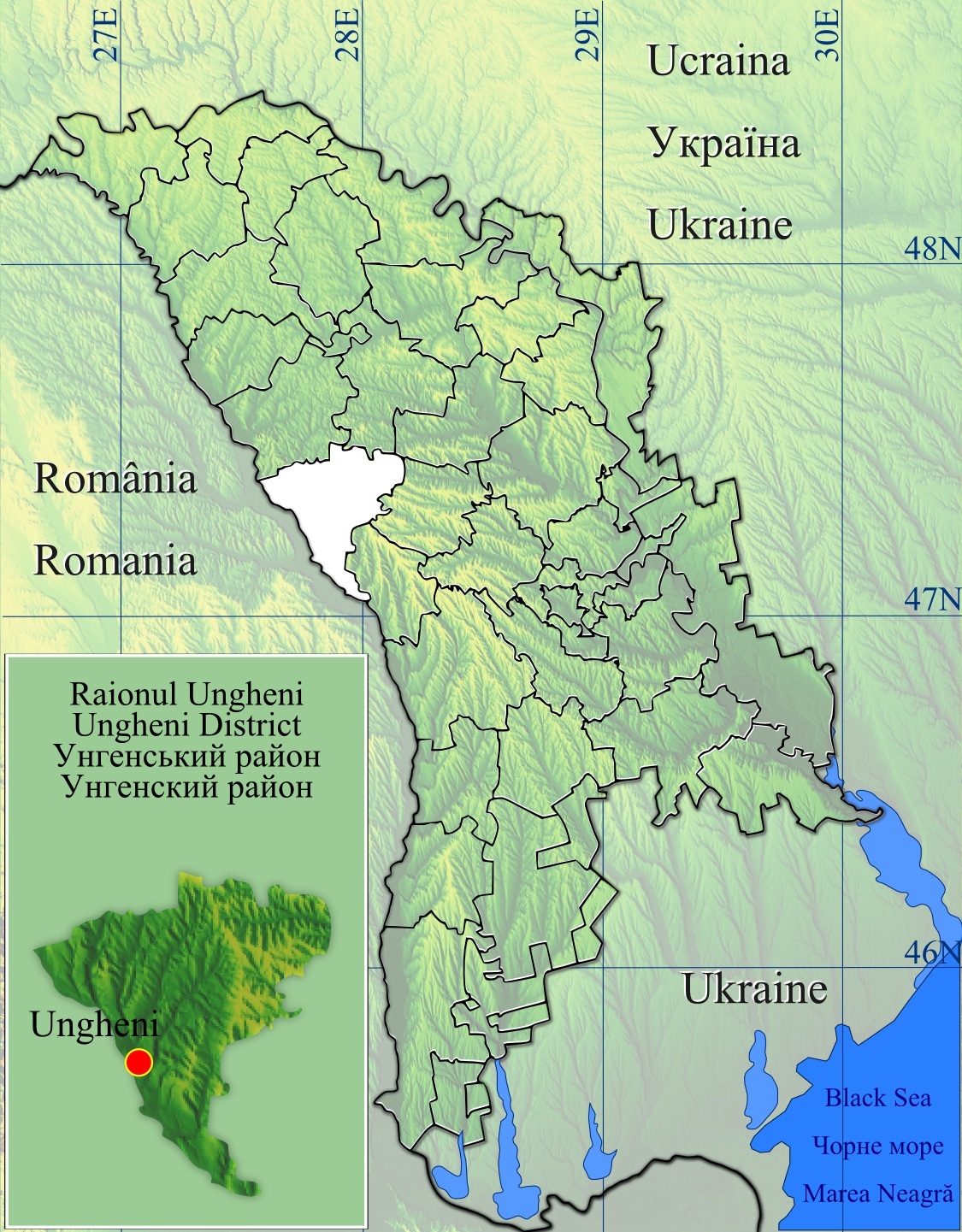
- Location within Ungheni
- Coordinates: 47°23′50″N 28°5′20″E
- Country: Moldova
- District: Ungheni District

Government
  - Mayor: Bodrug Vasile, 2007

Population (2014)
  - Total: 1,798
- Time zone: UTC+2 (EET)
  - Summer (DST): UTC+3 (EEST)
- Postal code: MD-3631

Hîrcești is a commune in Ungheni District, Moldova. It is composed of five villages: Drujba, Hîrcești, Leordoaia, Mînzătești and Veverița.
