= Hans Otto Roth =

Transylvanian-Saxon politician (1890–1953)

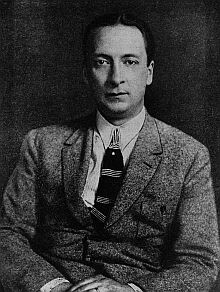
- A portrait of Roth from 1924.

Parliamentary Chairman of the German Party
- In office 1922–1938
- Monarchs: Ferdinand I of Romania; Michael I of Romania; Carol II of Romania
- Preceded by: Rudolf Brandsch
- Succeeded by: Party dissolved

Member of the Chamber of Deputies for Târnava-Mare County
- In office 1919–1938

Chairman of the Association of German Minorities in Europe
- In office 1931–1934
- Preceded by: Rudolf Brandsch
- Succeeded by: Kurt Graebe

Personal details
- Born: April 29, 1890 Segesvár, Austria-Hungary (now Sighișoara, Romania)
- Died: April 1, 1953 (aged 62) Ghencea concentration camp, Bucharest, Socialist Republic of Romania
- Party: German Party
- Education: University of Budapest

Hans Otto Roth (29 April 1890 – 1 April 1953) was a Transylvanian Saxon politician and lawyer. Roth was best known for his unsuccessful attempts to counter the rise of the radical Nazism favored within the German Party and within the German ethnic group in Transylvania.

Born in Sighișoara, Roth studied law at various universities around Europe before graduating with a doctorate from the ELTE Faculty of Law in 1913. In 1918, Roth joined the Saxon Central Committee to support the unification of Transylvania with Romania. In 1919, he won a seat in the Chamber of Deputies representing the German Party, and by 1922, he replaced Rudolf Brandsch as Parliamentary Chairman of the party. His time in parliament saw him focus on the issues of denominational schools and cooperation between the Germans and Hungarians before he retired in 1938. During his time in parliament, he was also briefly Chairman of the Association of German Minorities from 1931 to 1934, where he at first advocated for pan-Germanism. He met Adolf Hitler in June 1933, which altered some of Roth's views, although many Jews in Transylvania still felt betrayed by Roth.

In the following years, Roth became increasingly anti-Nazi with the advent of the "renewal movement". Roth's views were generally considered Christian liberal, which put him in opposition to many of the Nazi Party's views. He was approached many times to be a minister in various Romanian cabinets, but declined because the Iron Guard all had places in these cabinets. In 1943, this led to a climax between Andreas Schmidt and Roth, and Roth was expelled from the party. He kept working at the time as regional church curator of the Evangelical Church of the Augsburg Confession in Romania, a position he had held since 1932. His various attempts to stop the self-Nazification of the church led to failures. After the 1944 Romanian coup d'état, Roth asked Saxons to remain loyal to the Romanian state and wrote numerous memorandums to the Romanian government asking them not to judge his people too harshly. Roth was first arrested in August 1948, which triggered a wave of alarm, although he was eventually released. He was re-arrested in 1952 and held in the Ghencea concentration camp, where he died.

== Early life and education ==
Hans Otto Roth was born on 29 April 1890 in Sighișoara on the street Kleingasse 1 (now Strada Tache Ionescu), which was then part of Austria-Hungary. He was the sixth and youngest child of lawyer and city judge of Sighișoara Karl Roth (1846–1901) and Louise Roth (née Hausenblaß, 1855–1915) and was the grandson through his maternal side of a factory owner. He attended elementary school in Sighișoara where he graduated in 1900, and then attended the local Protestant high school in Sighișoara until 1908 where he was a part of the student self-government called Coetus Chlamydatorum. From 1908 to 1912, he studied law at the universities of Budapest, Vienna, Berlin, and Zurich. In April 1913, he received his doctorate in law from the ELTE Faculty of Law of the University of Budapest, where he was also the president of the League of Transylvanian Saxon Students. Afterwards, from 1913 to 1915, he worked in the Budapest law firms of A. Teteleni and Karl Schmidt.

At the start of World War One, Roth was initially deemed unfit for service, so he became deputy editor of the Transylvanian Saxon daily newspaper Siebenbürgisch-Deutsches Tageblatt, replacing Hermann Plattner, who had been drafted. He worked under the leadership of Emil Neugeboren. In January 1916, he was conscripted for military service in the Austro-Hungarian Army, and he served as an auxiliary for Infantry Regiment No. 31 in Brno, performing exclusively clerical duties. He was briefly sent to Semmering during his time in the military to recover from apical catarrh of the lungs. In February 1917, he was released from military service due to illness. Afterwards, from February 1917 to 1918, he was an editor for Siebenbürgisch-Deutsches Tageblatt. In 1918, the union of Transylvania with Romania occurred, which inspired Roth to become secretary of the Saxon Central Committee, where he supported the union and the accession of Saxons to Romania. He was specifically chosen as secretary for aligning with the "Little Saxon" tradition, which advocated for legalism and integration into Romania, which had started to be prominent around 1900. The tradition acknowledged the cultural value of pan-Germanism but advocated keeping it separate from state politics, opposing efforts to implement it through political means such as territorial annexation, due to concerns about its legality. He was elected over more politically experienced politicians like Rudolf Brandsch, who advocated for a more radical pan-Germanic ideology, which the Little Saxons disagreed with as they thought merging into a greater German identity would dissolve the Saxon identity and erode their cultural heritage.

In 1919, Roth was part of the Saxon delegation that handed the decision of the Saxon representatives to the government in Mediaş, and afterward, the Saxon Central Committee announced the Transylvanian Saxons' decision to join the Kingdom of Romania. Roth also wrote the Saxon People's Program during this time, which was adopted on 6 November 1919, and he was thus considered a key player in the integration of Saxons into Romania. He wrote the program after many Saxons complained about the reforms following the accession, and he also led a delegation of Saxon peasants to Cluj to present their complaints to the Directory Council.

== Political career ==
=== Parliamentary work ===
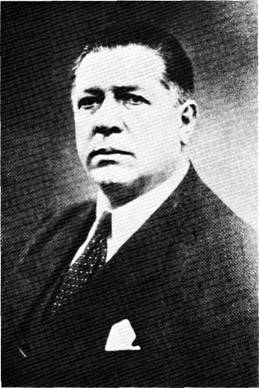
Rudolf Brandsch (pictured here) and Roth were rivals in the German Party for most of Roth's career.

In the 1919 Romanian general election, Roth won a seat in the Chamber of Deputies representing the German Party. In a speech in October, the month before the elections, he stated his campaign consisted of renewing confidence in the national vitality of Saxons, recognizing that the rejection of Hungary was not a betrayal and was justified citing the "abandonment" of the minority, and affirming that the pledges of King Ferdinand I to follow the results of the Great National Assembly of Alba Iulia were honest.

In 1922, Roth replaced Rudolf Brandsch as leader of the Parliamentary Group of the German Party. Roth was generally believed to have been chosen to replace Brandsch because Brandsch favored the strengthening of German self-consciousness and did not want to seek compromises with the ruling Romanian National Party, while Roth saw the possibility of the German-Romanians rights being enforced by a compromise. At the time in 1922, Roth admitted that he did not see ripe cooperation at the moment, but thought it only "conceivable", as he acknowledged Iuliu Maniu's position and said that the Romanian government was favorable to Saxons. He also stated that the Germans had a desire to contribute to Romania's development through what he called "constructive work" rather than political confontration. Roth's advocacy was ultimately successful as it led to a gain in seats for the party in the parliament and the government meeting some demands.

Soon after, in December, Roth defined what the German Party wished at a conference: the unconditional recognition of the Romanian state of the Saxons, full political and parliamentary activity even in matters that did not concern the minority, and implementation of the people's political program. In parliament, Roth tried to secure the rights he thought were promised to Germans, including German-language schools, equal rights in the economy, preservation of assets of the Transylvanian Saxon University, and land ownership. In 1924, Roth made a repeated plea for denominational schools, saying it was clearly enshrined in the 1919 Peace Treaty, and saying that Romania was "virtually confiscating" minority rights. This eventually led to the Private School Act of 1925, which standardized the Saxon school system. Roth characterized the legislation as a test of Romania's tolerance towards minorities. That same year, with the growth of pro-Nazi Party sentiments in Transylvania, Roth stated in an essay that fascism was "a setback of the national political movement" which had fought for the protection of self-determination for ethnic minorities.

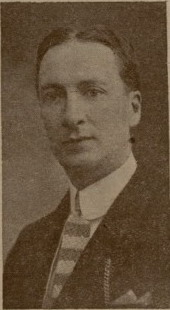
Roth in 1926.

Alexandru Averescu's 1925 agrarian reforms led to famine among the German-Romanians, especially in Bessarabia. The shipping agency Cosulich Line exploited the desperate German farmers by charging excessive fees for emigration to Brazil, which Roth condemned. Roth, after visiting the emigrants, demanded an investigation into the line and heavily criticized the Romanian government for what he perceived as its failure in addressing that the line purposefully exploited and took away the belonging of the emigrants who wished to go to Brazil.

In the autumn of 1921, the Hungarian Union proposed a joint political approach, which Roth rejected as too early. By 1923, the two parties began to collaborate extensively to resist Education Minister Constantin Angelescu's school decree (Nr. 100.008 and 100.090) as the regulations threatened their denominational schools. They formally met in February 1925 after the Hungarians reorganized at the German House of Representatives in Bucharest, where it was agreed there would be liaison officers instead of a straight minority bloc. In August 1925, Roth formally proposed joint political action between the two minority parties, but the cooperation fell apart in 1926 when Roth found out that the Hungarian Union had been secretly negotiating with the National Liberal Party. In 1927, a brief Hungarian German Bloc occurred, but it dissolved soon after.

Roth officially retired from parliament in 1938. One of his last actions in parliament was in January when he was received by King Carol II of Romania, where they discussed the German ethnic groups in Romania. In 1939, he was made a senator by right in the Senate of Romania, which he was awarded because he had won a seat in parliament in ten elections in accordance with the 1923 Constitution of Romania.

=== Association of German Minorities ===
In 1931, Roth was appointed Chairman of the Verband der deutschen Minderheiten in Europa (Association of German Minorities in Europe). By this time, Frühmesser, his biographer, interpreted that Roth approved of a pan-Germanist policy that included Austria because he expected it to have a positive impact on the Germans in Eastern Europe. His appointment as chairman was largely just a figurehead position, as the Reich wanted leadership that would not be portrayed in a radical National Socialist light and would not interfere in the Association's Berlin operations.

In 1933, Roth led a large-scale parade in Passau, where he said that Germans feel unimaginable pain due to conflicts. On 15 June 1933, in his capacity as chairman, Roth had a conversation with Adolf Hitler. In the meeting, Roth drew attention to the fact that the anti-semitic measures of the German Reich could have a negative impact on the treatment of German minorities, although Hitler defended his moves and dismissed Roth's concerns. This caused Roth to start rejecting Hitler and Nazism. Three months later at the European Congress of Nationalities, Roth spoke about nations dissimilating, a nod to Jewish Germans being excluded. His views were inconsistent, as he still at first advocated for dissimilation, while at the same time saying no nation-state can be built on the annihilation of other people. This led to many Jews in Transylvania having an increasingly harsher stance against Roth, as they believed he no longer took any stance against the persecution of Jews. He was replaced by Kurt Graebe in 1934.

=== Rise of Nazism and World War II ===
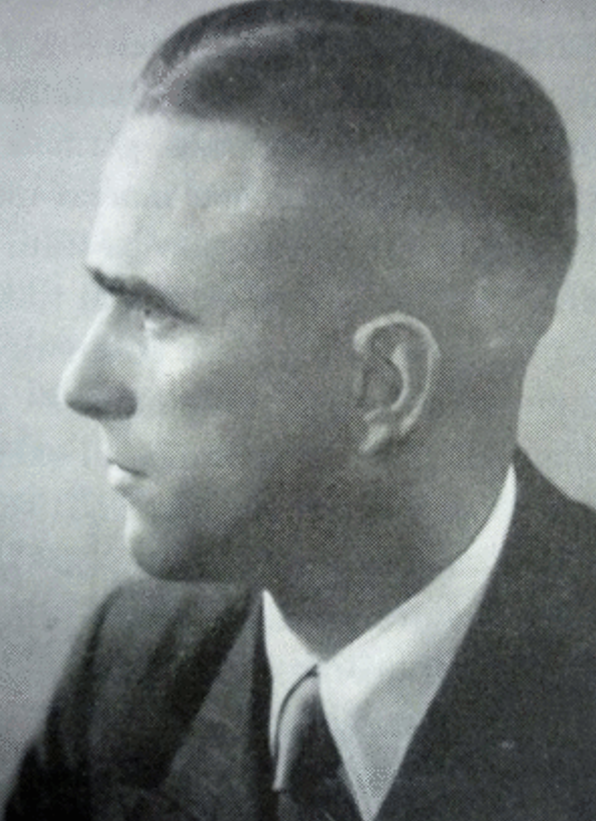
In 1943, the conflict between Andreas Schmidt (pictured here) and Roth intensified to where Schmidt removed Roth from the Ethnic German Group of Romania.

Upon the National Socialist Party's dissolution in 1934, many blamed Roth as an internal opponent to it by using the church's influence to overthrow the now-renamed German Party, the Nationalsozialistische Erneuerungsbewegung der Deutschen in Rumänien (Movement of National Renewal of Romanian German; NEDR), along with spreading rumors in the Kronstadter Zeitung newspaper against it. This was because Roth's views were generally considered Christian liberal, which put him in opposition to many of the Nazi Party's views. He was then attacked by a Nazi-affiliated newspaper, who said that Roth's leadership was "rotting internally" without a backbone and accused him of disrespecting the Germans who died in the Battle of Langemarck and calling them "stupid boys". Roth also received criticism in 1936 from Nazi-aligned members within the Transylvanian Saxon community, who accused him of dissolving Völkisch organizations to replace them with loyal commissioners, deliberately harming the other main Transylvanian Saxon party at the time called the German People's Party, and that his banking policies led to loss of land. He had long been an opponent of the increasingly popular Nazi renewal movement under Fritz Fabritius, with Andreas Schmidt calling him a divider of the movement. However, Roth encouraged his circle to join the National Renaissance Front, a surrogate party for the Nazis, in 1939 due to tactical reasons, although he deliberately missed the deadline for admissions to be a member himself.

On 4 July 1940, Roth was appointed Minister of State for Minorities in the Gigurtu cabinet. His appointment was generally believed to be because King Carol II wanted to preserve the territorial possessions of Greater Romania, which he though Germany would enforce after seeing the successes of the Wehrmacht on the Western Front in 1940. Roth declined the appointment as he did not want to share the responsibility for the awarding of Northern Transylvania to Hungary with the Second Vienna Award, he decried the appointment of Iron Guard members in the cabinet, and he feared that Nazis would "set traps" for him as minister. On 22 July, Roth told the king that he rejected the position. The king did not formally recognize his refusal, so as not give the impression that the Germans rejected him, and the position remained vacant until Gigurtu's resignation. It was also rumored that the Hungarian government was dissatisfied with Roth's appointment because Roth was German, whereas they thought the Hungarian minority was much bigger. In September 1940, Ion Antonescu was appointed Prime Minister, and on 8 September he asked Roth to join his cabinet as Minister of Justice. Ross refused, so Antonescu then offered him the Ministry of Education and eventually a ministry of his choice. Roth explained that his refusal was in objection to Horia Sima and his legionnaires from the Iron Guard still being in alliance with Antonescu.

In 1943, by which time Schmidt had become head of the German Party, his conflict with Roth had a sudden climax when Roth opposed the enrollment of Romanian-Germans in the Waffen SS, including Roth's son, with Schmidt responding on 28 September by calling him a public enemy. Roth was accused of being a "traitor to the people" in December 1943 and was expelled from the now-named German Ethnic Group in Romania (the renamed German Party). Schmidt justified this further by saying that Roth was one of the rare exceptions that did not understand the Nazi revolution, and he added that this revealed his attitude toward the ethnic group. He also called Herbert Roth, Hans's son, a "slacker" and "coward" for refusing to join the Waffen-SS, so Hans challenged Schmidt to a duel. Schmidt refused, and Hans filed a defamation lawsuit which ended with a fine on Schmidt after the end of the war. Roth was also in contact with many members of the German resistance and the Romanian resistance, including Hans Bernd von Haeften, Carl Friedrich Goerdeler, and Ulrich von Hassell, all of whom were executed for their roles in 20 July plot, and the communists Vasile Luca and Constantin Pîrvulescu. In July 1946, Roth wrote to Haeftens' widow, calling the plot a good act, as it bore positive fruit for Romanian-Germans as Germans would otherwise suffer.

=== Coup d'état and subsequent memorandums ===
On 23 August 1944, the day of the Romanian coup d'état, Roth asked the Saxons and Swabians to be loyal to the Romanian state in order to avoid the stigmatization of the German minorities. Then, in September, Roth urged Romanian-Germans not to flee the country and called for loyalty to the state of Romania, especially since many Swabians were leaving after the Nazi "Swabian Self-Protection" organization intimidated and frightened Swabians to evacuate Banat. On 27 October, Roth signed a memorandum which argued there was danger in punishing all Romanian-German supporters of Hitler, saying people who were not guilty were dragged, and he added that "the seducers and the seduced will be judged by the same measure". A few days later, on 31 October, Roth submitted another memorandum asking for the peaceful transfer of Protestant denominational schools to the German minority, explaining that the Nazis annexed the evangelical church through forceful means. He issued his final memorandum on 1 November, saying that innocent people were paying the price for the "disastrous policies of the former leaders", and asked Romanians to look at the long historical coexistence of Romanians and Romanian-Germans.

Through the Evangelical Church of the Augsburg Confession, Roth tried to establish an informal Saxon representation and inform Saxons about the situation in Romania in 1948. Writing in 1948, Roth blamed the SS actions of 1943, which conscripted ethnic Germans into military service with the approval of the Romanian government, calling it "the most serious mistake in Saxon history". He feared that any association between the Saxons and paramilitary activity would lead to further reprisals against the Saxons that still lived in Romania, who are already lost their farmland as punishment for the 1943 SS conscriptions, so he asked West Germany to help prevent this.

=== Arrests and death ===
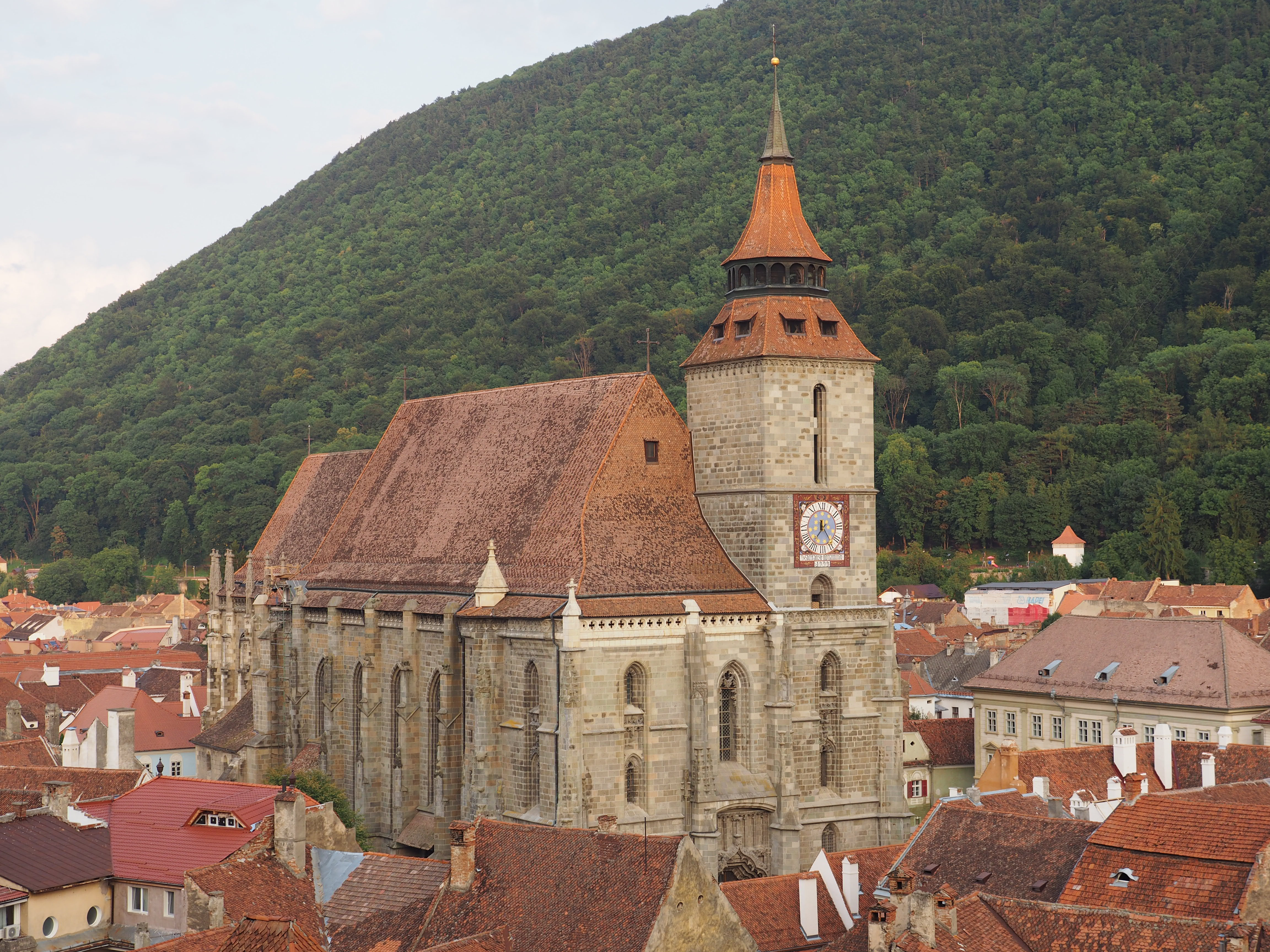
Roth's memorial service was held at the Black Church (pictured here) by the pastor Konrad Möckel.

The Securitate, the Romanian intelligence agency, had made reports about Roth's anti-Nazi views with his activities in the German ethnic group in Romania after the coup, but ignored his attempts to distance himself from the Nazi movement as he was a former bourgeois politician. Roth was arrested for the first time in August 1948 by the Siguranța while on vacation in Sibiu. He was accused by authorities of concealing his part ownership of a large Saxon bank owned by the Reich, which triggered a wave of alarm by the Saxons as they feared a new wave of persecution. Roth was held for about eight weeks in the Interior Ministry Palace in Bucharest before being released. During this time, a short trial was held about the case, where he was originally sentenced to 6 months in prison, but after appealing the verdict the case was dismissed.

In 1950, the house in which the Roth family resided on Constantin Noica Street in Sibiu, Romania, was expropriated. He moved to a house with other residents on Negruzzi Street, and took accounting courses to secure an income because he was forbidden from practicing law, his original occupation. He could not find a job, and so he did odd jobs with the support of his former friends. In February 1952, Gavrilă Birtaș, the head of the Securitate's Directorate of Domestic Surveillance, requested a file from the Securitate's Sibiu Regional Office. The report ended with the proposal to arrest Roth because of his influence among Germans in Romania, which was approved by Birtaș. Roth was arrested again on 15 April 1952 and labeled an "enemy of the people". Numerous acquantinces of Roth's were then interrogated by the Securitate about Roth and Nazism, including Otto Herzog and Richard Zintz. The other prominent member of the German Party, Rudolf Brandsch, was arrested in Sibiu the night before.

On 5 July 1952, the decision was made for Roth to go to administrative detention for 24 months, and he was ordered to be sent to the transit center in Bucharest on 21 July. He arrived at the transit center on 2 August 1952, and was then transported to Bărăgan at a labor camp. According to testimonies from other prisoners, the labor camp in Bărăgan was shut down after Roth's family last visited in March, and he was then moved to Ghencea concentration camp. On 1 April 1953, Roth died in the Ghencea concentration camp, a camp for political prisoners in Bucharest. His family was not informed of his death. His death certificate stated his cause of death was uremia. Roth's family disagreed with this and testified that they were never told exactly how he died. In May 1953, the protestant pastor of Brașov, Konrad Möckel, held a memorial service at the Black Church for Roth's family to commemorate his death. Möckel spoke of Roth's devotion to the Saxons extensively.

== Religious leadership in the Evangelical Church ==
From 1932 to 1949, Roth was regional church curator of the Evangelical Church of the Augsburg Confession in Romania. The regional church curator was the highest secular office in the church community, which supported the bishop in his duties and represented the bishop.

=== Leadership during Nazi control ===
In July 1941, Nazi-loyalty Wilhelm Staedel was elected Bishop of the church with 60 of 105 votes, replacing Viktor Glondys. The Nazi-controlled church leadership then attempted to transfer church assets and place church schools under the Nazi-controlled consistory. Roth responded by advocating for a postponement, stating he had only just learned of the proposal and raised legal concerns such as the Volksgruppe not yet being constituted as a legal entity. While he endorsed the principle of a transfer in general, he voted against Staedel's specific proposal, which was regardless approved a vote fo 12 to 6. He changed his mind in 1942 and said the provisions of the proposal for the transfer that was adopted the previous year for not taking into account the church order's provisions, though he indicated his willingness to compromise by supporting amendments to the church order rather than rejecting the agreement entirely. The Nazis eventually prevailed, achieving what historians have termed "self-Nazification" of the church through the explicit coordination between the Volksgruppe and Nazi-aligned church members. Historians have attributed this outcome in part to a miscalculation by Glondys and/or Roth, who underestimated the extent of Nazi pressure and internal support for the movement within the church. Roth asked for a resignation from the position of curator in March 1943, which he eventually withdrew after the 1944 Romanian coup d'état. In early 1944, in an audience with Minister of Culture Ghiță Popp, Rudolf Brandsch said that Roth had illegally and without the approval of the Lutherans in Romania, placed himself as head of the Lutheran office in Hermannstadt.

=== Post Nazi-control period ===
In October 1944, Bishop Wilhelm Staedel resigned, and Roth wished to replace Staedel as bishop with episcopal vicar Friedrich Müller, which Glondys disagreed with. An agreement was made soon after where Roth took over the political contacts of the church with the government where he had to legitimize the newly denazified church. In January 1945, Glondys's claim to be bishop was rejected, which allowed for Müller to be elected, although he ran into some opposition initially due to his initial praise of Hitler in 1941 for being anti-communist. Friedrich Müller was elected bishop in 1945, and Roth was re-elected as curator until 31 March 1951. Roth was eliminated as regional church trustee in 1948 as a result of the "Sparkasse Trial", which concerned his former role as President of a Saxon savings bank. Despite being acquitted, he chose not to run again in the 1949 church elections, presumably recognizing that his status as a former "bourgeois" parliamentarian made him a target for accusations that could effect Romanian Germans. He had been on a leave of absence since October 1948.

== Roles in Transylvanian Saxon institutions ==
In addition to his political career, Roth held numerous chairmanships in Transylvanian Saxons' institutions. He was the temporary president of the Hermannstädter Allgemeine Sparkasse, a credit bank, from 1928 to 1932, lending him influence in the economic field. Roth was also Chairman of the Sibiu Electricity Works from 1939 to 1942, alongside being Chairman of the Transylvanian German Publishing House.

== Personal life ==
Roth married Paula Copony in 1918. His father-in-law, Deputy Traugott Copony, held a seat in the Hungarian Parliament, and was close to the Romanian government. Together, Roth and Paula had a daughter, physicist Marie Luise Roth-Höppner, who was born in 1930 and made her residence in Sibiu. They also had one son, Herbert Roth, who like Maria Luise was sent to multiple correctional prisons starting in 1958 for possessing a letter written by detainee Fritz Theil.

== Legacy ==
In 2010, a commemorative plaque was unveiled at Roth's birthplace at Strada Tache Ionescu. In 2022, a film was shown in Sibiu about the life and work of Roth. He was also included in a special exhibition at the History Museum in Sighişoara on the law and constitutional practices of the Transylvanian Saxons, which the Department for Interethnic Relations presented in 2024. Thomas Frühmesser also wrote a doctorate on him in 2011.
