= Viktor Glondys =

German-Romanian Lutheran bishop (1882–1949)

The Right Reverend Viktor Glondys
- Bishop of the Evangelical Church of the Augsburg Confession in Romania
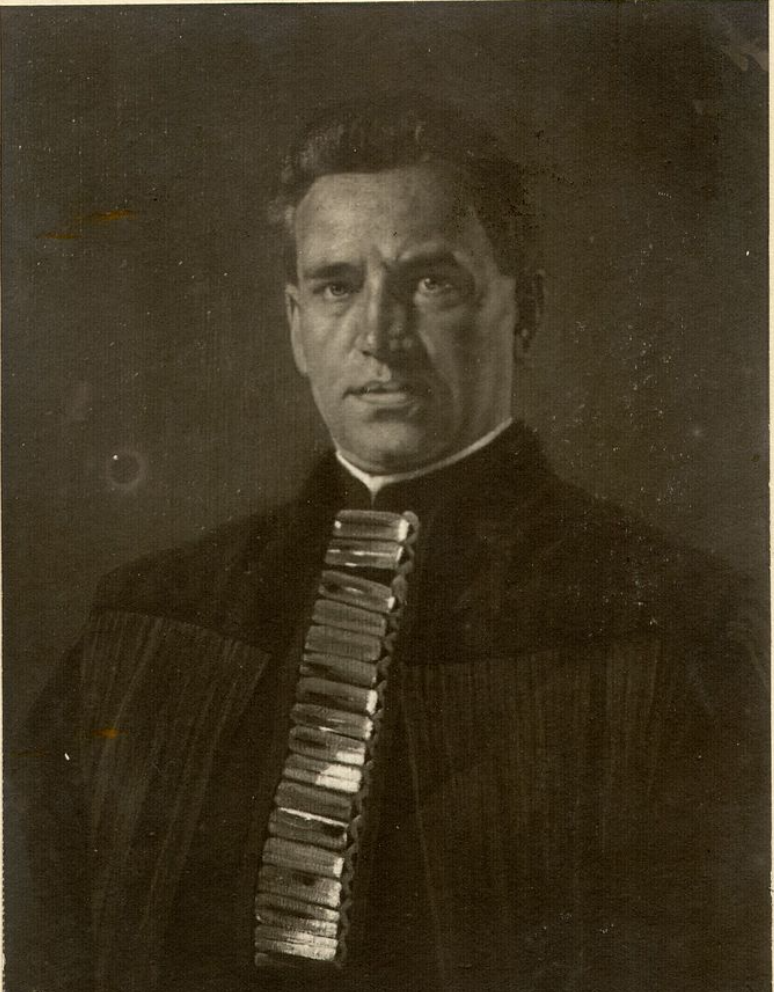
- A portrait of Glondys taken c. 1930.
- Church: Evangelical Church of the Augsburg Confession in Romania
- In office: 20 November 1932 - 16 February 1941; 19 October 1944 - January 1945

Orders
- Ordination: 9 October 1910 by Josef Fronius
- Consecration: 20 November 1932

Personal details
- Born: 7 December 1882 Bielsko, Duchy of Teschen, Austria-Hungary
- Died: 28 October 1949 (aged 66) Sibiu, Socialist Republic of Romania
- Denomination: Lutheran
- Education: University of Graz; Chernivtsi University
Styles of Viktor Glondys
- Reference style: The Right Reverend
- Religious style: Bishop

Viktor Glondys (7 December 1882 – 28 October 1949) was a theologian and Lutheran bishop of the Evangelical Church of the Augsburg Confession in Romania. Born in Austria-Hungary and of ethnic German origin, he became active in Czernowitz and then present-day Romania, notably within the region of Transylvania after its union with Romania in 1918.

Born in Bielsko in then Austria-Hungary to an ethnically German family, Glondys initially studied philosophy before having a crisis of faith in 1903 that motivated him to convert to Lutheranism; he then started studying evangelical theology instead. His first pastoral assignment was as a vicar in Eisenau. He then became a personal vicar in Czernowitz in 1909. In 1910, he was officially ordained and inaugurated there, before in 1912 becoming pastor following the previous one's retirement. As a pastor, he led the congregation there through multiple Russian occupations during World War I before eventually being forced to flee to Upper Austria. He then advocated for a pro-Austria view during the war and was a refugee pastor. He later endorsed the Union of Bukovina with Romania after the fall of the Russian Empire. In 1922, he was elected city parish priest of Brașov. During his tenure, he was known for his extensive lectures on theology sponsored by the Gustav Adolf Association. In 1930, during the Great Depression, Glondys was appointed a priest. Soon after, in 1931, he delivered one of his most famous speeches on the Good Samaritan, which rejected völkisch interpretations of it and advocated for the universal commandment of love. He was attacked by the self-help movement (a pro-Nazi movement) for this speech, which eventually led him to state it was a "misunderstanding".

In 1932 he became bishop of the Evangelical Church of the Augsburg Confession. He quickly started addressing the matters of autonomy for the church and school institutions. He eventually allowed Nazis to be accepted into church leadership. In 1934, during a meeting of the volksrat, or a People's Council of ethnic Germans, a fallout happened between him and the Nazis, upon which he revealed the existence of their plans to undermine the church. After a split in the self-help movement, Glondys started supporting the moderate factions of the Nazis in a concordat. By 1938, the Nazis gained a majority in the consistory, upon which Glondys immediately shifted to aligning himself with völkisch rhetoric and joining the National Renaissance Front. In 1939, he made another controversial decision against the Nazis, stating that he alone made ecclesiastical decisions and that no party disciplined the church. This eventually led to the new Volksgruppenführer of Romania, Andreas Schmidt, pressuring him to withdraw from the church, which he did in 1941. After this, he went to work at the Lutheran Academy and started promoting anti-Nazi works and interpretations of the bible, but in 1944 the Romanian coup d'état happened and the Nazi consistory was overthrown. It was agreed upon that Glondys would return to the post of bishop. During this brief period as bishop, Glondys tried to push a viewpoint to the government that the ethnic Germans were forced to, under moral duress, to cooperate with the Nazis, including in memoranda. However, the Soviet Control Commission demanded that Glondys be removed from office for being sympathetic toward Hitler, and so he was again forced into retirement in February 1945. From then on, he kept a relatively minor profile before dying in 1949.

== Early life ==
Viktor Glondys was born on 7 December 1882 in Bielsko, which was then part of the Duchy of Teschen in Austria-Hungary. He was the son of Joseph Glondys (1834–1906), the master baker of the town, and Johanna Glondys (née Klimecki; 1848–1938). Both of his parents were Catholic and ethnically German, and together they had four other children. While his father was ethnically German, he considered himself an Austro-Hungarian citizen first and then German, which led him to join the pro-Austrian forces against advocates for pan-Germanism among the German ethnicity.

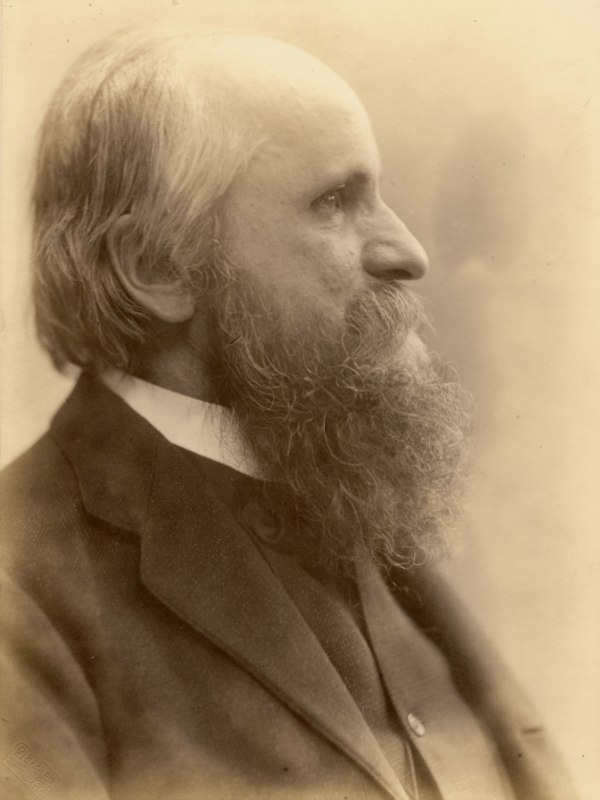
Alexius Meinong (pictured here) taught Glondys at the University of Graz and was a large influence on him to join the Lutheran faith.

Glondys first attended a German primary school in Biała until 1893, and then from 1894 to 1901 attended the state humanist grammar school in Bielsko, where he completed his matura. Afterwards, he entered the University of Graz studying philosophy. In 1903, while studying at the university, he had a crisis of faith. After his exposure to philosophy without any theological commitments, he started to question the Catholic Church's dogmas and customs and became increasingly estranged from the church. This was probably influenced by philosopher Alexius Meinong, whom he studied under at the University of Graz, who focused on epistemology and logical theory that took an analytical approach, which encouraged Glondys to examine the church's religious dogma. Although Away from Rome! (Los-von-Rom-Bewegung) was influential during this time in converting Germans to Lutheranism, he was not affiliated with the movement and instead probably converted to Lutheranism in part because of Meinong's logical approach.

Due to his conversion, Glondys decided to start studying evangelical theology in Vienna, Marburg, and Strasbourg. He entered the candidate house in Bielitz, a residential facility for seminary students and clergy, in August 1906. He passed his ministerial examinations as a Protestant clergyman in Vienna in 1907.

== Early pastoral ministry ==
A map of present-day Romania with key points of his ministerial career there.

=== Early 1910s and World War I ===
Glondy's first pastoral assignment was as a vicar in Eisenau, a small village in the region of Bukovina now known as Vama in Romania, which functioned as a branch of the Iacobeni parish. He first started distinguishing himself during this time through his sermons and religious instruction. He also became known for founding an evangelical preaching station in Kimpolung (Bukovina), which had previously had denominational fragmentation. He led his inaugural service in May, which countered contemporary skepticism of Christianity. On 15 November 1909 he passed his second theological examination before the Galician-Bukovinian superintendency in Biała. Due to him also having previously sat for his Examen pro candidatura at the University of Vienna's evangelical theological faculty, and passing in March, he was thus appointed as personal vicar to Josef Fronius in Chernivtsi (then known as Czernowitz). On 9 October 1910 he officially arrived at the church in Czernowitz, and was ordained and officially inaugurated by Fronius and Preacher G. Derer, where he gave his first speech on John 3:17.

In October 1911, Fronius announced his intentions to retire from service and move to Baden. On 15 October, elections were held for a candidate to succeed Fronius, and Glondys was elected with 313 of the 318 votes in a near-unanimous election. However, he was the sole candidate and the other 5 votes were ineligible (the parish council did not invite external preachers to stand as a candidate in the election). On 1 January 1912 Glondys officially took up the post in a de facto position until 18 February, when he was meant to be formally inaugurated, with Fronius giving his farewell sermon on 24 January based on Psalm 20. He was formally inaugurated in this position on 25 February, which was conducted by Konsenior Deder. During the second occupation of the city by the Army of the Russian Empire in the midst of World War I, he led a sermon where he viewed the Russian occupation with apprehension, noting the panic it led among the local population even through the troops were orderly and enforced strict censorship and patrols. However, despite many fleeing, he stayed in the city, stating that he was a spiritual caregiver.

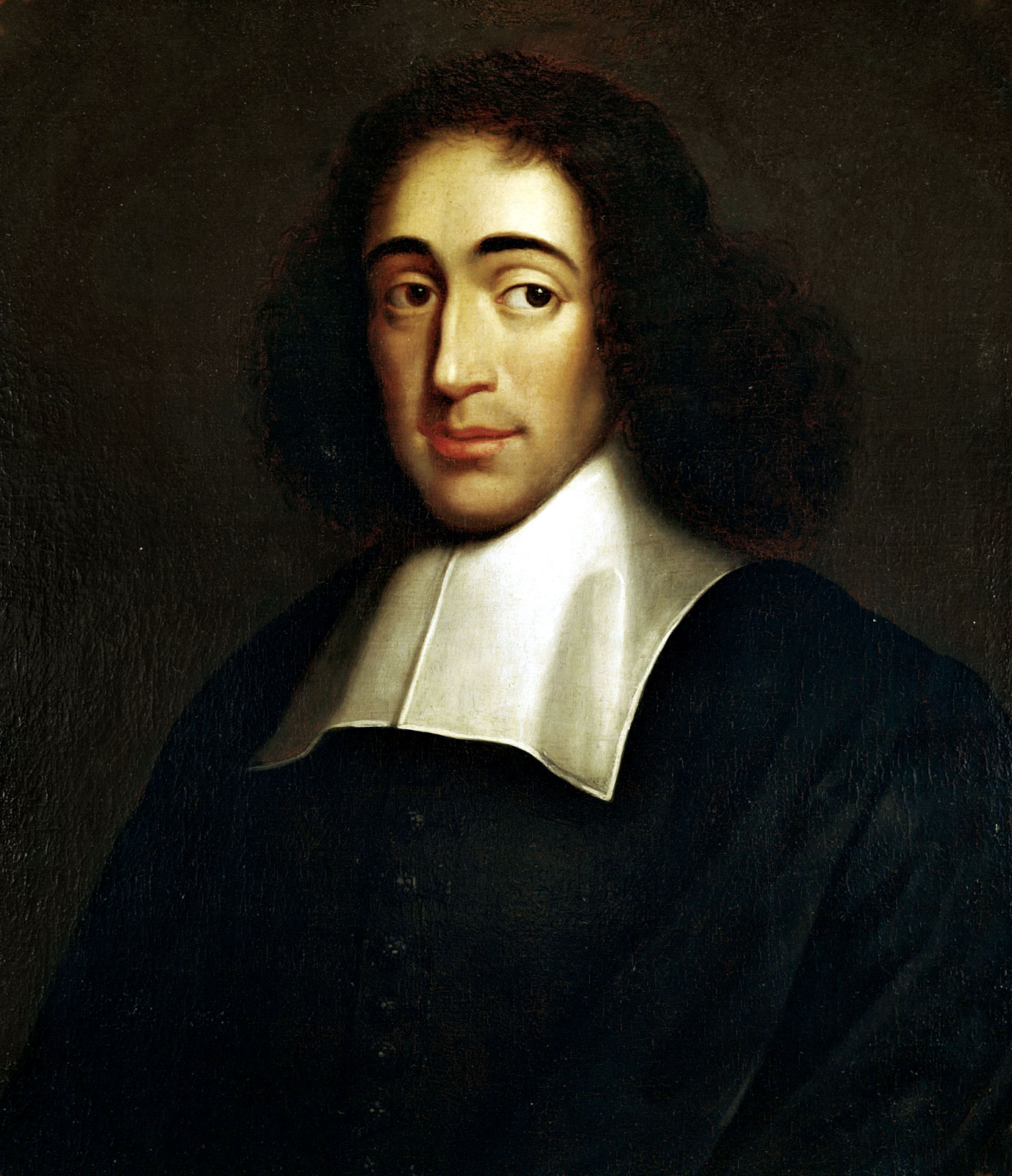
Baruch Spinoza (pictured here) was the subject of Glondys' doctoral dissertation. He focused on Spinoza's metaphysical ideas.

Glondys briefly took personal leave to Graz, where on 25 March he was awarded the title of Doctor of Philosophy at the University of Graz's Faculty of Philosophy. He passed the main philosophical examination with a doctoral dissertation which explored Baruch Spinoza and his metaphysicial ideas, including Spinoza's key concepts of modes, substance, and attributes, to determine whether Spinoza's philosophical system was internally consistent, excluding external philosophers' later interpretations of Spinoza's works. Glondys developed the central idea that attributes were "existence modes of substance". The thesis received general distinction; however, the faculty did note in their remarks approving it that he limited his subject by focusing solely on immanent observation and criticism, which led to less rigorous elaboration, but due to his having to flee Czernowitz due to the Russian invasion, he had less access to literature on the subject. He returned to Czernowitz on 2 April. A few months later in June 1916, he came back to the city during the third occupation by the Russians. He was marked for deportation to Siberia, and so he fled the city by foot, going from Vienna to Ödenburg, eventually making his way to Haag am Hausruck in Upper Austria during a brief exile. He then advocated for a pro-Austria view during the war, and was recognized for his "merits" in promoting war bonds. Meanwhile, he was also listed in records as a refugee pastor for evacuated Bukovinians in upper Austria. He endorsed the Union of Bukovina with Romania in late 1918 alongside Alois Lebouton as a representative in the General Congress of Bukovina.

In 1919 Glondys became a doctor habilitate lecturing in epistemology and the history of philosophy at Chernivtsi University after returning to the city following its annexation by Romania. He also continued to write during this time, notably focusing on the topic of Bessarabian Germans, which he published through the Sibiu Deutsche Tagespost. He also held a series of summer courses in German at Hermannstadt during the summer, focusing on the problem of the psychic and the pursuit of truth while balancing exact science.

=== Priest of Brașov and interwar period ===
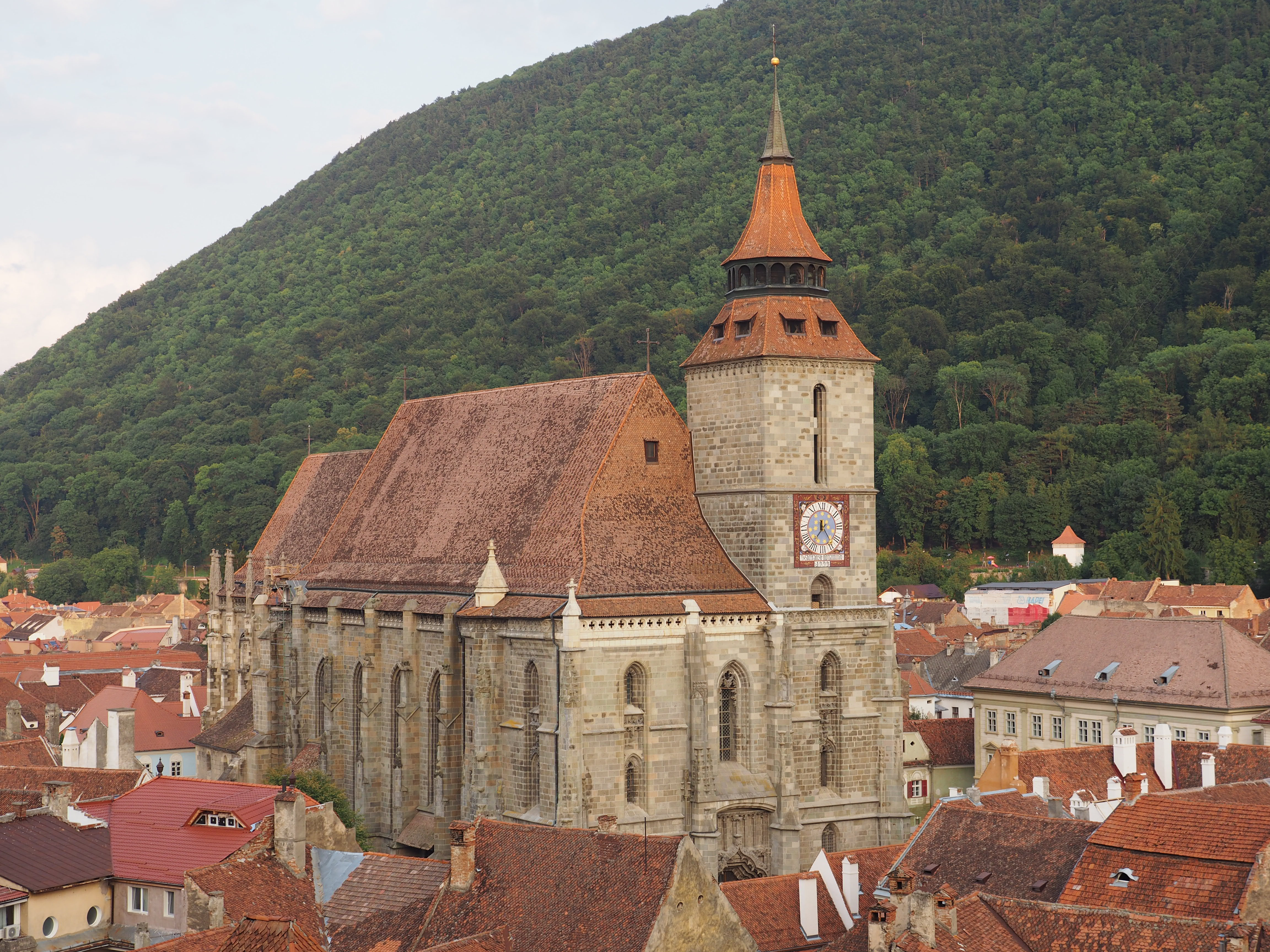
During the interwar period, Glondys was parish priest and eventually priest of the city of Brașov. Pictured is the Black Church, one of the most famous churches in Brașov.

In June 1922 Glondys was elected city parish priest of Brașov (in German Kronstadt), arriving in the city on 7 June and being officially inaugurated the following day. He was addressed by District Dean Reichart-Zeiden, and his first pastoral act as priest was a benediction following the ceremony's end. During his time as parish priest, he continued to deliver scientific lectures, especially on determinism as a pedagogical problem. His lectures were sponsored by the Gustav Adolf Association, including at least one on Luke 17:5, where he probed and asked the congregation if prayer was still needed, whether they should pray this way, and if people even wanted it. He was also invited by the Deutsch-völkischen Fortbildungsbund (German-Völkisch Continuing Education Association) to deliver sermons and lectures across Germany including at Leipzig, Halle, Berlin, and Dresden during 1924.

In addition to these activities of delivering lectures and sermons, Glondys wrote books on philosophy through Krafft & Drotleff A.G. in Sibiu (Hermannstadt), on what he stated was the problematic nature of Christians' belief in God, specifically the intellectual barriers that stopped people from believing in God. In a sermon in 1928 he set forward some ideas of his: that German-Evangelical life must be active in Romania, and that the previous decline in German influence led to a deeper awakening; he celebrated the idea of a cohesive German national identity. He also advocated to keep the 7% of state taxes for religious purposes that was implemented in Romania during this time, which he stated was necessary and mirrored what the Reich was doing. He lectured at the University of Vienna in February 1930 about the basis for knowing that God certainly exists. The 33rd Landeskirchenversammlung (regional church assembly) held supplementary elections for the role of Bischofsvikar. The elections, which were carried out on 5 July 1930, led to Glondys becoming priest due to the death of previous holder Adolf Schullerus. However, the election was marked by what was described as a "struggle" because of differences regarding the historical backgrounds of the "Old Kingdom" and the "new provinces", such as Transylvania. On 6 September 1931, in light of the self-help movement under Fritz Fabritius gaining traction, he delivered a sermon on the Good Samaritan. He spoke out against the alienation of others by people who supported völkisch interpretations, stating that the universal commandment of love is valid, specifically stating:

Ebenso für Chinesen und Neger wie für Juden und Abendländer, ebenso zur Zeit Jesu wie heute und zu allen Zeitene.

This applies equally to Chinese and Negroes as it does to Jews and Westerners, as it did in Jesus' time, as it does today, and in all ages.

— Viktor Glondys, Sermon on 6 September 1931 about the universal commandment of love

However, Glondys later issued a formal "declaration of honor" regarding some of the statements he made in the speech that directly criticized the self-help movement after Otto Fritz Jickeli led a campaign against him using the publication organs of the movement alongside the "Race Pope" Karl Günther, where Glondys stated there had been "misunderstandings" regarding the leadership's intentions. In autumn 1931 he eventually went to the general assembly of the Euckenbund—an intellectual movement—that was held in Jena on the invitation of Irene Eucken to diagnose the spiritual crisis at the time. Euckenbund at the time sought a national moral renewal that critics later linked to Nazism, but Glondys viewed it as a philosophical platform to channel "national movement" into a reawakened Protestantism based on Christian ethics. In addition, he praised the renewal movement, especially their voluntary labour camps. On 7 June 1932 he completed his ten years of service as a parish priest and then vicar, for which he was praised for contributing educationally to the church as an "outspoken fighter", even though the congregation noted he had trouble integrating into Transylvania early on.

== Evangelical Church of the Augsburg Confession ==
=== Appointment and rise of fascism ===
In 1932, a district synod of the church in Tepliß announced six candidates for the position of bishop of the Evangelical Church of the Augsburg Confession in Romania after the previous bishop, Friedrich Teutsch, retired. The candidates included Glondys. The conclusion was postponed, as internal agreements among parish delegates needed to be accepted. On 15 November 1932, the new date for the election, Glondys was registered as a candidate for the election. The election was contested between him, Hermannstadt city pastor Friedrich Müller, self-help supported pastor Wilhelm Staedel, and the Mediasch lyceum Hermann Jekeli at the bishop's palace. Although there was rumored to be a tough race, Glondys was immediately elected in the first round, with 84 of the 139 votes securing an absolute majority. He was elected the first non-Transylvanian Saxon to the position in 380 years, mostly due to the new regions of Romania since the last election, like Banat, Bessarabia, and Bukovina, wishing to shape the church. He was given royal assent by King Carol II and formally installed on 20 November. At his formal installation and for his opening sermon to the 35th Church Assembly, he emphasized that the church had to assert moral influence in decisions within the nation. He called the current situation at the time volatile, noting student protests in Bucharest, Gyula Gömbös visiting Benito Mussolini over France, and the tensions among German minorities.

Soon after being elected, Glondys started to address the matter of autonomy for the church and its school institutions, for which he advocated alongside church curator Hans Otto Roth to the Prime Minister Iuliu Maniu and the Minister of Education. He had two goals: to deepen international contacts which he could use as domestic political leverage against the central government, stating the church could fulfill a mission across Southeastern Europe; and to have ethnic cohesion between the ethnic Germans in Romania through the Lutheran faith. Due to this, he tried to steer the church away from party and political motivations, although the Nazis had already started to take over some ecclesiastical youth organizations. However, he was also blamed during this time for being the decisive member who let the Nazis start to be accepted into the church leadership; Glondys permitted this as a form of "cohabitation" to limit and prevent damage, which backfired on him. In addition to letting cohabitation happen, in January 1933, he allowed the regional church to accommodate the self-help movement on the basis of carrying out community projects in Transylvania. Parish offices stated in reports that the movement was clearly distanced from the church, had no loyalty to it, and was more focused on its leader, the Scharführer. Despite these objections during the movement's trial run with the church, he supported and allowed the consistory to enter a formal agreement with the movement on the basis that they would allow church order and not use it for propaganda, allowing the movement into the structures of the church in the hopes it would be partially neutralized. Thus, in the years of 1932 and 1933, his position could best be described as indirect criticism, since he never fully denounced the movement. However, in secret meetings after Hitler's seizure of power, he took a more moderate approach that called for the adaptation to also include the ethnic-moral forces of the renewal movement, a position for which he was eventually criticized.

By 1934, Glondys had grown increasingly anti-Nazi, but was still distanced from political engagement. This is best seen through Volksrat (People's Council) sessions held by the ethnic Germans, after Otto Fritz Jickeli stated that the Nazis were being "unfairly attacked". This led to Glondys responding that the agitation by Nazis would lead to a rupture within the Saxon community and calling them disrespectful. Soon after, in a special edition newspaper, Glondys revealed the existence of a manual from the self-help movement which instructed members to infiltrate church bodies with the intent to undermine the church's plans. This led the consistory to demand that its employees leave the self-help movement (which was now known as the NEDR after its ban in 1933). He also forced the NEDR to declare its manual obsolete and enter into an agreement known as Z. 1486/1934, which forced NEDR to recognize the church's anatomy and remove previous agreements with the movement. However, he was ideologically split by the end of 1934: in his private diary dated to December, he expressed an admiration for Wilhelm Frick, who wrote the Gleichschaltung laws that consolidated Hitler's rule, after Frick reinstated school prayer and promoted religious education in Thuringia.

Afterwards, in July 1934, NEDR was banned again, eventually leading to a split in its movement: one fraction was led by Bonfert; Gust created the German People's Party (DVR) that was more radical; and the founder of the self-help movement Fritz Fabritius led the "moderate" Nazi fraction. Eventually, Glondys struck a deal with Fabritius: he would support Fabritius's referendum, which proposed a national vote to legitimize Fabritius's party, but also at the same time led to stronger Nazi elements in the party to satisfy both the conservatives and radicals; Glondys offered to recognize it in exchange for legal guarantees protecting the autonomy of the church and preservation of religious instructions. This resulted in what was effectively a Concordat: the church recognized Fabritius's party (Volksgemeinschaft), intended to keep the church away from radical Nazism favored by the German People's Party; he maintained this recognition even when the referendum failed. In 1936, Glondys issued Circular 924/1936, which mandated that employees of the church withdraw from political activity, but he exempted the moderate Nazis associated with Fabritius. This also caused radical Nazis, especially pastor Wilhelm Staedel, to be removed from the church, causing deep resentment from within. Staedel then represented himself as a martyr for radical Nazism after 68 of the church employees refused to sign the circular, eventually leading to Glondys suspending him for four years from office. This led to Glondys showing restraint on actively resisting Nazism, and, at least in letters, noted he was worn down by the warfare between the political parties of the DVR and the Volksgemeinschaft. Some argue that since 1937, Glondys had a clear shift in favor of the policies in Nazism, although he sought to keep a separation of faith and ideology.

After the adoption of the 1938 Constitution of Romania in February, which led King Carol II to form a dictatorship, Glondys pledged his full commitment to the strength of the church towards the aspirations of the new constitution in a tribute telegram. On 30 April, alongside Roth, Glondys met with Minister of the Interior Armand Călinescu to present matters of the German church and of the evangelical church as a whole after the signing of the new constitution. Glondys raised some concerns; Călinescu responded that he would accommodate the church. In July 1938, the Nazis gained a majority in the church's superior consistory, which is seen as a miscalculation by either Glondys or Roth, allowing the members to have a mandate duration from 1939 to 1945. Immediately upon the new regional church assembly's opening in July, he aligned himself with völkisch rhetoric in a speech which praised eugenics and called assimilation with non-Germans a violation of God's will and a sin that was of the harshest punishable acts in the Old Testament.

=== Start of World War II and resignation ===
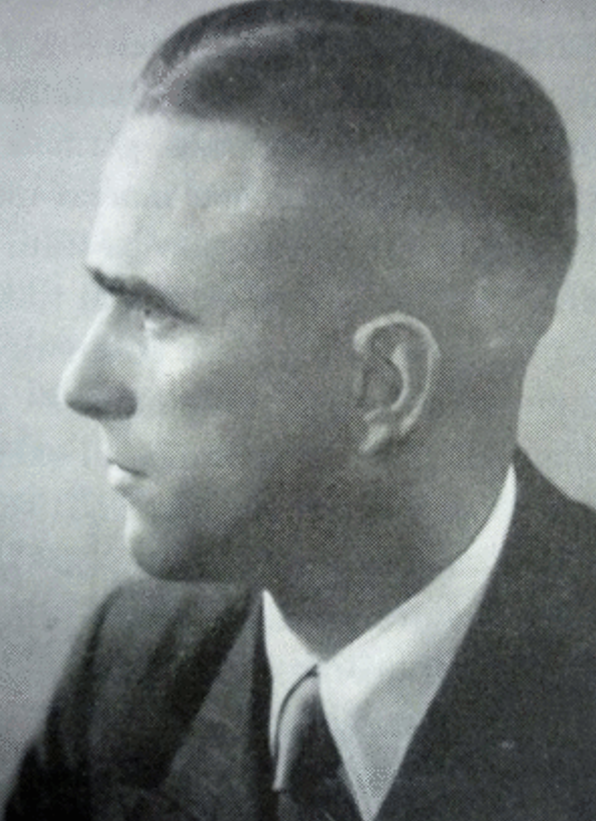
Andreas Schmidt (pictured here) advocated for Glondys resigning during World War II, which he eventually managed to force him to do.

Early in the year of 1939, on 15 January, Glondys declared his accession to the National Renaissance Front to Patriarch Miron of Romania, which had become the sole monopoly party in Romania following Carol II dissolving all other parties which directly embraced Nazism. He also prepared an agreement with Helmut Wolff, reversing his previous moves and allowing "appropriate participation" from members of the Völkisch movement, which was a decisive change. In March, he began promoting cultural pride and loyalty in the Saxon diaspora abroad and urging them to be proud of their German identity, saying they should balance loyalty to their host countries and also devote themselves to their ancestry to instill pride in "German roots". A few days later, in what was one of the most important decisions for the relationship between the church and Nazism, a meeting of the consistory happened. Despite Hans Otto Roth's objections, Wolff was able to succeed in getting Glondys to push through an order on 3 March which stated that all church employees were to place themselves in the service of the collaboration between the church and the National Labour Front and to promote the front's movements within the German ethnic minority. On 24 February 1939, according to some sources, an entry in Glondys' diary revealed that he declared his entry into National Labour Front, handing over his decision to Wolff, where he noted that he declared in his oath that it would not bring him into conflict with his obligations as bishop or affect the duties of the church. This diary entry was later debated because Böhm, a historian on the topic, claimed that it solely stated he joined the National Renaissance Front (a symbolic gesture because it was the sole representation) while others disputed that it was him joining the National Labour Front (which was under Nazi control and would have signalled direct alignment).

Fabritius, in private lectures, boasted about these actions and called Glondys a party comrade, claiming that the church was so far under the party's influence that it would even hold Roman Catholic or Jewish masses at discretion. However, following the departure of Wolff from the consistory, Glondys made a decision ex cathedra—in authority—on 30 November stating in the session no one had received orders, which was a challenge to the idea that the party disciplined the structures and could override Glondys' ecclesiastical decisions. This declaration had the effect of causing an internal rupture with Glondys' previous collaborations, so the Nazi loyalists started accusing consistory members aligned with Glondys of refusing to submit to disciplinary actions and demanding a purge of members. However, what truly consolidated Glondys' downfall was when in the autumn of 1940 Andreas Schmidt became Head of the German Ethnic Group in Romania and Volksgruppenführer of Romania. After Schmidt took power, he decided to remove Glondys as he saw him as an obstacle to the alignment of the church with Nazi ideals. After taking medical leave in Germany on 30 November, Glondys returned to Romania in December 1940, whereupon he was confronted by Schmidt. Schmidt delivered an ultimatum saying that collaboration with Glondys was impossible and he must resign from the seat of bishop. Although Glondys initially attempted to resist, Schmidt publicly attacked, threatened, and pressured him, which led Glondys to submit. On 15 December 1940, he officially announced his resignation from office due to impaired health, which put him on permanent retirement, and it was approved for Glondys to officially leave on 16 February 1941. He was replaced, under the influence of Schmidt, by Wilhelm Staedel on 19 July 1941. Staedel had previously been disciplined by Glondys and barred from seeking higher ecclesiastical offices after he refused to accept Circular 924/1936, but Schmidt managed to override church law for him.

=== Exile and return ===
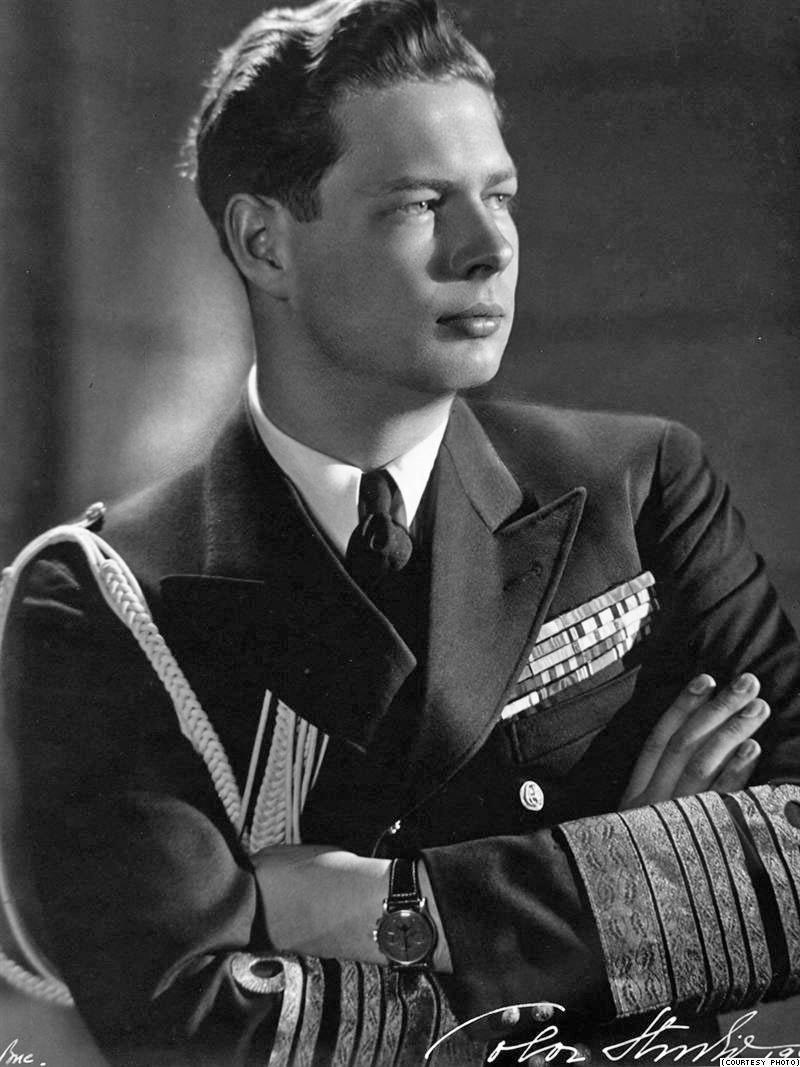
Glondys placed his hope after the 1944 coup that King Michael I would help avoid the persecution of Transylvanian Saxons.

After resigning, Glondys went to work temporarily at the Lutheran Academy in Sibiu, which he had founded to provide ecclestical educational opportunities for the youth. In this post, he still exerted some influence and began to fight against the "national church" after it came under subordination of the German People's Party under Schmidt. He rebutted people who came into prominence at the time, like pastor Andreas Scheiner, who had dismissed the traditional evangelical dogma as outdated and proposed a "folk religion" which embraced Nazism. He also confronted Ekkehard Lebouton, who had attempted to eliminate Jewish influence on the church and who also proposed antisemitic interpretations of the Deutero-Isaiah. Due to the subsequent censorship of his texts rejecting the church leaders at the time, Glondys collaborated with Friedrich Müller by illegally distributing copies of his responses through hectograph. However, he was also blamed by former pastor of the Biserica Neagră, Konrad Möckel, who said Glondys for not taking a stronger stance against the Nazis, likening him to a sand sieve against a landslide, and for his willingness to compromise. During the time, Glondys also started publishing in theology journals like the Journal of Systematic Theology, where he discussed interpretations of the Words of Institution. He argued these interpretations overlooked their worldview dimension and that understanding the idea of the future divine world being with the present one is essential. Finally, he was also the president of the Gustav-Adolf Association starting in August 1940 after it became a legal entity, from which he later resigned.

On 23 August 1944, the Romanian coup d'état happened, where Prime Minister Ion Antonescu was overthrown and the state stopped aligning with Germany. After the reconstitution of the governing body for the church, he was called back to resume his duties in October 1944. It was agreed that Glondys would assume the responsibility for theological representation while Müller would take over administrative affairs because Müller opposed Glondys' reinstatement, but conflict between the two would restrict any effectiveness in helping the Germans. During this meeting, it was agreed upon that all ecclestical measures enacted under the rule of the Nazis would be declared null and void and that they were for forced upon under moral duress, and he stressed in the strongest terms possible that the church needed to show that they disapproved the events by removing all "politically compromised individuals". Leo Stern soon after visited Glondys, stating he was conducting a study from the Soviet Union for a report on the situation of Transylvanian Saxons and how deeply involved they were with Nazism.

On 27 November 1944 Glondys, Müller, and Roth created a memorandum which they presented to Michael I of Romania which refuted accusations that the Saxons were all disloyal and collaborators with Germany, and stated that ethnic Germans fit for military service were forced to enlist in the German Army. They handed it over to the Marshal of the Court, Dimitrie Negel, who appeared slightly sympathetic to the minority; nothing ever came of it because the King did not have true power at the time. In order to try to convince the Communist government to not punish the German minority, he stated the view that the various factions among Transylvanian Saxons must adopt a "leftist-oriented" approach. Glondys also started advocating for the government to allocate funds to the church for pension payments because he said parishioners were now not obliged to church taxes, hoping that a "Law on Nationalities" would be passed, which also did not come to fruition. In private letters soon after, the Allied Control Commission (predominantly led by the Soviets) demanded the absolute dissolution of the church due to Nazism, which the Minister of Religious Affairs rejected as being too sweeping when the consistory after 1941 and Staedel were not recognized. However, the Romanian government declined to approve Glondys' assumption of office, as the Soviet Control Commission had cited his Hitler-friendly attitude, and so he was forced out of office to retire again on 5 February 1945. He was succeeded by Müller as bishop on 19 April. In other respects, the church was largely spared from denazification because of Müller advocating for the "Lutheran principle of forgiveness" and pointing to staffing shortages in parishes.

After his second retirement, not much is known about Glondys, besides that he continued giving lectures and was employed by the Lutheran Academy in Sibiu again as the president. Most of these lectures series were subsequently posted through Kirchliche Blätter. He also briefly returned to teaching schools over religious instruction in the area.

== Personal life ==
In 1912, Glondys married Alice Mayer (1888–1978), who was the daughter of Czernowitz's finance director and hofrat, Johann Mayer. Together, they had one son named Kurt Glondys on 3 November 1913. At the time of Viktor's death, his son lived as a refugee in Zell am See, and was an architect who was known to be diligent. Kurt was close friends with Gregor von Rezzori. Later in life during the 1940s, Glondys suffered from a severe unidentified illness, which led him to go on multiple medical trips to Germany and which he eventually used as an excuse to retire. On 28 October 1949, Glondys died in Sibiu at the age of 66.

== Honours and awards ==
On 22 May 1930, Glondys was conferred the title of Doctor theologiae honoris causa by the Faculty of Theology at the University of Breslau with a unanimous vote by the faculty's senate. In January 1939 he was unanimously awarded membership to the Senate of the Luther Academy in Sondershausen.

== Legacy ==
Glondys' legacy has been seen as mixed. On one hand, many praise his efforts to stop the renewal movement under Fritz Fabritius in the early 1930s, which blocked attempts to Nazify the church in the early 1930s. He was widely praised for his 1931 "Samaritan Spirit" sermon, which condemned ethnic exclusion and confirmed the idea of the universal commandment of love, which was a rebuke against the völkisch theories spread by the Nazis about the Good Samaritan.

However, Glondys was also extensively criticized for his inability to choose and take concrete actions on the severity of the church against members of the congregation at the time who were sympathetic to the Nazis by his contemporaries. He also was known for his willingness to compromise with "moderate" factions of Nazis starting in 1935, which some argue undermined the church's authority and allowed subversive elements to take root in the church. This forced Glondys' retirement in 1941 and led to the formation of a "National Church", which was subordinate to Nazism until the 1944 Romanian coup d'état.
