= Andreas Schmidt (politician) =

Transylvanian Saxon politician (1912–1948)

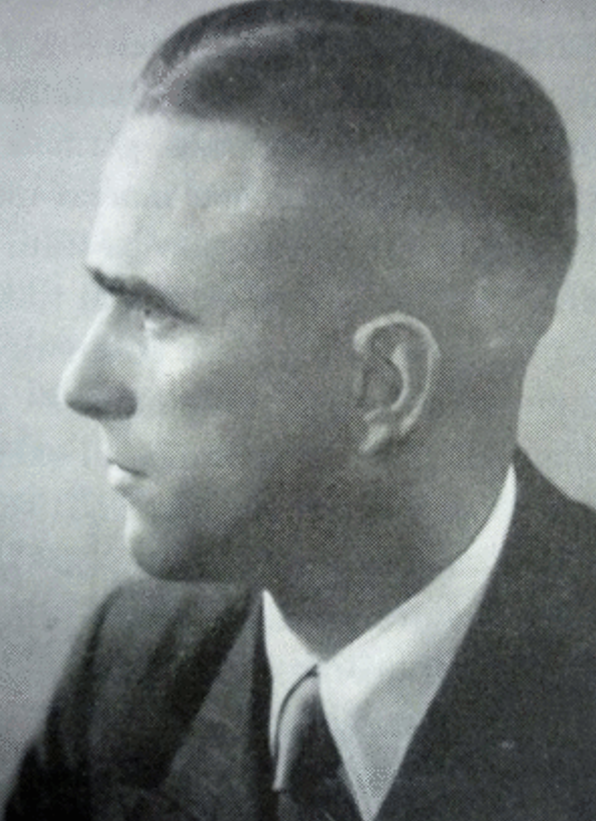
- A portrait of Schmidt from 1941.

Head of the German Ethnic Group in Romania (GEGR)
- In office November 1940 – August 1944
- President: Ion Antonescu
- Preceded by: Wolfram Bruckner
- Succeeded by: Position abolished

Volksgruppenführer of Romania
- In office 27 September 1940 – August 1944
- Preceded by: Wolfram Bruckner
- Succeeded by: Position abolished

Representative of the Volksdeutsche Mittelstelle
- In office 1939–1940

Personal details
- Born: 24 May 1912 Donnersmarkt, Transylvania, Austria-Hungary (now Mănărade, Alba County, Romania)
- Died: 1948 (aged 36-37) Vorkuta, Komi ASSR, Soviet Union
- Party: National Labour Front (NAF); NSDAP
- Spouse(s): Christa Berger (m. 1941; died 1942) Adele Kaufmes (m. 1944–1948)
- Children: 2
- Education: Babeș-Bolyai University (did not graduate)

Military service
- Allegiance: Kingdom of Romania; Nazi Germany
- Branch/service: Romanian Army; Schutzstaffel
- Years of service: 1935-1939 (Army); 1945 (SS) (Note: Schmidt did not join the Waffen-SS until 21 December 1944 as a Hauptsturmführer der Reserve after Berger submitted a request to Himmler on 6 January. Although he was de facto a member due to his close associations with the SS, with him referring to himself as such, he was likely delayed entry to serve the interests of the SS.)
- Rank: Hauptsturmführer der Reserve
- Battles/wars: World War II

Andreas Schmidt (24 May 1912 - spring 1948) was a Transylvanian Saxon politician, ethnic group leader, and later a member of the Schutzstaffel (SS). He served as Head of the German Ethnic Group in Romania (GEGR) from November 1940 to August 1944, and was also a Volksgruppenführer (ethnic group leader) of Romania from 27 September 1940 to August 1944. In these roles, he helped lead the Nazification of the German minority in Romania, recruiting many to the SS and aligning the group with the Reich's beliefs.

Born into a powerful family Transylvanian Saxon from Mănărade, he initially studied law at Babeș-Bolyai University, but later dropped out. After studying at the Agricultural University of Berlin, he became involved with many SS members, and he was trained to Nazify the ethnic Germans in Romania. Returning to Romania the following year, he took on three positions as a member of the SD, Head of Staff of the National Labour Front, and Representative of the Volksdeutsche Mittelstelle (VoMI). In this role, he helped recruit hundreds of ethnic Germans in Romania into the Waffen-SS.

On 27 September 1940, when he was 28, he was appointed Volksgruppenführer of Romania by Werner Lorenz. He also became Head of the German Ethnic Group in Romania (GEGR), which became the sole representative of ethnic Germans in Romania in November. In this role he often collaborated with Horia Sima and his father-in-law. In May 1943, he also negotiated an agreement between Romania and Germany allowing some ethnic Germans to go on short-term leave to volunteer with German troops. However, by early 1944, he lost influence within the Reich due to his closeness with Berger during his row with Ernst Kaltenbrunner. He was then accused of sexual harassment, excessive ambition, and making derogatory statements against Kaltenbrunner, which led to him almost getting fired. After the 1944 Romanian coup d'état, Schmidt helped organize Operation Regulus to install an anti-Soviet resistance movement and organize a revolt in Romania. After being turned in, he was transferred to Vorkutlag, a Soviet gulag labor camp, where he died in the spring of 1948, likely due to the prison administration ordering prisoners to beat him to death with axes. However, there were multiple versions of his death due to the uncertainty surrounding it.

== Early life ==
Andreas Schmidt was born on 24 May 1912 in Donnersmarkt, Transylvania, Austria-Hungary (now Mănărade, Alba County, Romania). He was part of the ethnic minority of Transylvanian Saxons in Romania. His parents were Georg Schmidt and Maria Schmidt née Simonis, who were both farmers. His mother descended from people who had long lived in the village of Donnersmarkt, occupying high positions.

After finishing elementary school, he attended Stephan Ludwig Roth Gymnasium in Mediasch from 1923 to 1929. However, due to his poor grades at Stephan Ludwig and his failure to graduate with his abitur, he had to attend St. Vasile Gymnasium in Blasendorf from 1929 to 1930. During his time at Vasile, he was described by a classmate as "a less talented young man with shabby clothes who had swapped the Gymnasium in Mediasch for the one in Blasendorf because he had repeatedly failed in Mediasch." After graduating from Vasile, he attended Babeș-Bolyai University in Cluj-Napoca studying law, but he did not graduate. He then volunteered for the Romanian Army. He was a cavalryman in the army together with Andreas Rührig, his later chief of staff. He also made his first political contacts during this time in 1930 when he was working at the voluntary labor camps eventually, in 1932, becoming camp commander. He spent, around 1933, some time with Richard Langer in Cincu, who was close to the Artaman League and the German People's Party in Romania.

Schmidt claimed that by 1935, three years later, he was part of the party leadership in the German People's Party. This occurred after a power struggle in 1935 when the Nazi movement around the relatively moderate fascist group, the self-help movement created by Fritz Fabritius, split creating the radical German People's Party under Alfred Bonfert and Waldemar Gust and more moderate Nazis around Fabritius, but he did not take a leading role in either.

In 1938, he decided to leave Romania to go to Germany, where he studied at the Agricultural University of Berlin. There he met many Schutzstaffel (SS) members, and he was trained in Nazi indoctrination of the ethnic Germans in Romania. In 1939 he returned to Romania as a voluntary member of the SD in Foreign Intelligence (Amt VI) and Head of Staff of the National Labour Front.

== Political career ==
=== Representative of the Volksdeutsche Mittelstelle (VoMI) ===
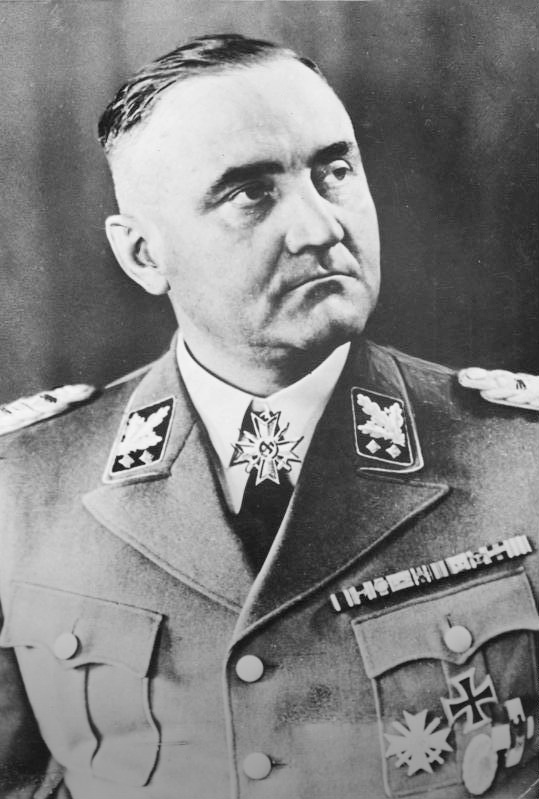
His father-in-law, Gottlob Berger, for whom he recruited 1,000 German-Romanian SS volunteers.

Returning to Romania in 1939, he then became a Representative of the Volksdeutsche Mittelstelle (VoMI), fulfilling various roles. VoMI was meant to represent the Volksdeutsche - ethnic Germans outside of the Third Reich - and implementing Lebensraum.

In this role, he recruited 1,000 Romanian Germans and 500 Hungarian Germans to the SS for his father-in-law, Gottlob Berger. They were encouraged to join in the columns of the Deutsche Zeitung, with the Zeitung publishing war letters from ethnic German SS volunteers that glorified their units. They were recruited under the pretext of being farm workers in the Reich although they were actually joining the SS, as it was illegal to border cross and it violated the volunteers' military service obligation to Romania with their desertion. Franz Anton Basch, a Volksgruppenführer, opposed this because he said it would have serious consequences for the Volksbund led by Basch, alongside most of the VoMI even though it was approved by the German government. Schmidt also met with Hans Otto Roth, a member of the Romanian Parliament, in order to carry this out.

In April 1940, he also helped a radical faction that intensely supported Nazi-ideals among the two German ethnic groups in Banat achieve power after a dispute. In August 1940 in accordance with the Second Vienna Award, Transylvania was divided, and Schmidt's territory now fell within the Romanian part. The German Ethnic Group was given the status of a "legal person" along with the competence to make "mandatory decisions" for the German minority in Romania.

=== Volksgruppenführer ===
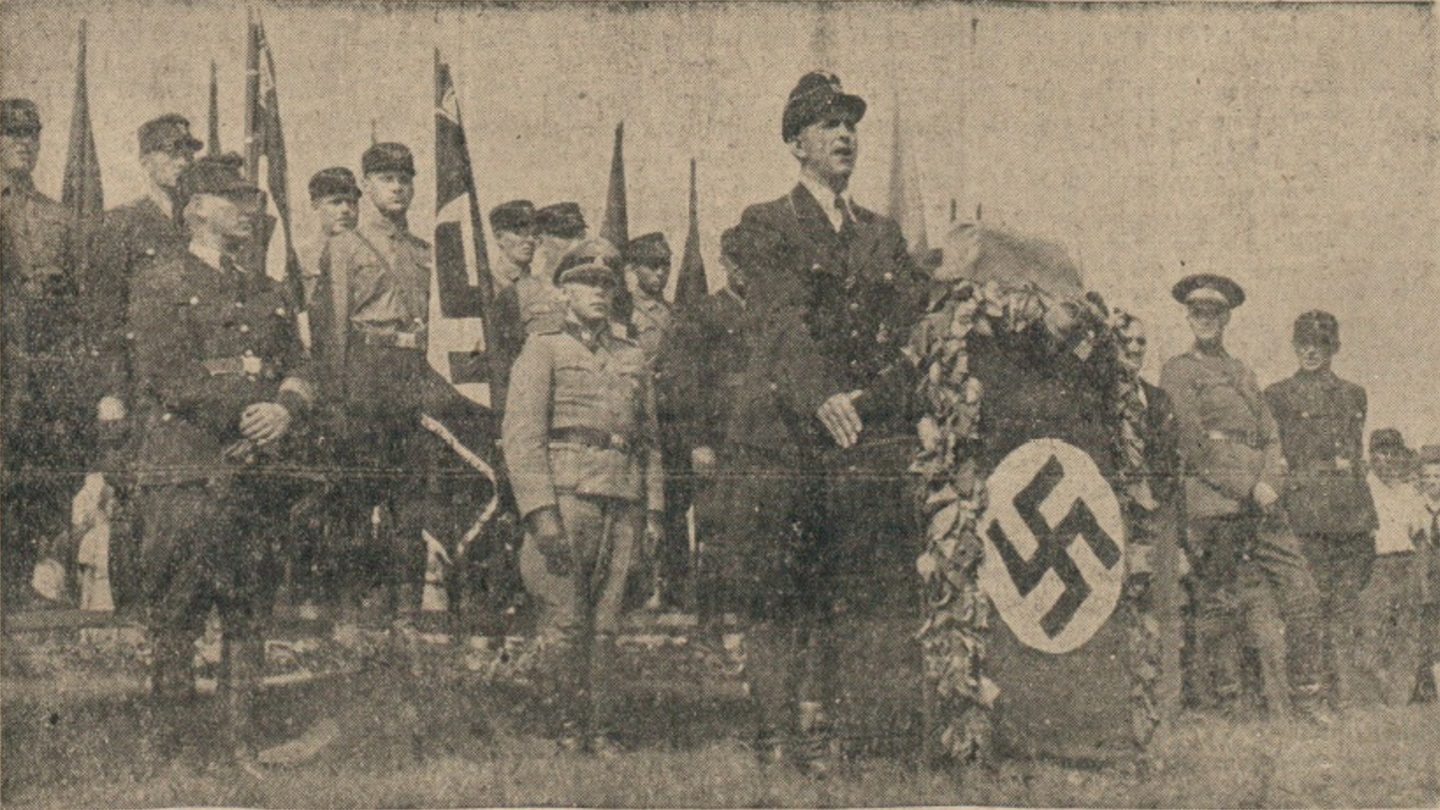
Schmidt saying goodbye alongside Viktor Stürmer to the first 1,300 SS volunteers from Transylvania in 1943.

In September 1940, Schmidt was summoned to Berlin alongside the then ethnic group leader Wolfram Bruckner, where Lorenz stated that due to "wartime circumstances," the German minority needed an "official" person rather than what he deemed was someone who was solely honorary, and indicated that Schmidt would be good for the post. Schmidt was nominated during a leadership reshuffle by the Reich, who purged moderate leaders and favored ones who were obedient and held more radical Nazi views. Bruckner immediately opposed this, nominating Nikolaus Hans Hockl to fill his post instead, which Lorenz rejected. On 27 September 1940, then 28-year-old Schmidt was appointed a Volksgruppenführer (ethnic group leader) of Romania in a formal ceremony at Brașov alongside German Consul General Wilhelm Rodde. Almost immediately after, Schmidt relocated the GEGR's headquarters from Sibiu to Brașov to increase cooperation with Rodde, who had been taken by Joachim von Ribbentrop to monitor GEGR and Schmidt.

He appointed Andreas Rührig, his friend since the army, as his deputy and staff leader. Among the first actions that Schmidt did was reorganize the leadership structures of the German minority in Romania as part of a Gleichschaltung policy that aligned the minority with the German's models. On 15 October 1940 Schmidt issued for an order for all German youths from age 10 to compulsory be conscripted to the Deutsche Jugend in Romania, and by 1944 it had some 74,000 members. He also helped reorganize the Jugend to reflect NSDAP youth hierarchies, including the offices of the Landesjugendführer for the national youth program and Landesjungenschaftsführer which used propaganda to appeal to school-age children. The NSDAP of the German Ethnic Group in Romania (GEGR) became the sole representative of ethnic Germans in November, which he was appointed in charge of. The legal formalization of this was, by Romanian law, prohibited as Ion Antonescu had prohibited the creation of organizations parties, but Schmidt justified this by saying it was instead "Nazi-inspired framework" which was approved by Decree-Law 38877, which named GEGR as a legal entity instead of a party.

Following his appointment, oriented the GEGR's intelligence ties from the Abwehr to RSHA Amt VI-SD Ausland, which was part of the SS. He also often collaborated with Horia Sima, the acting commander of the Iron Guard, with Schmidt arranging for the appointment of members of the Volksgruppe as mayors of Sibiu and Mediaș and on the appointment of gauleiters before the rebellion. Some people he recruited also went to espionage school and returned to Romania as "permissionaries", assigned to intelligence services or at Andr's disposal.

Schmidt soon proved himself as a contact person during the Legionnary Uprising of Iron Guard members, an uprising he called "racially determined" and so he recommended that the influence of the German Reich become stronger in order for there to be tranquility. He was also very willing to serve the Reich because of his need for power, describing them as a counteract to the racial inability, and so he formulated the German ethnic group to have unconditional readiness for the Reich. During a major speech in Hermannstadt in early 1941, he also defined his stances, stating that although the ethnic group had started to take over the administration of schools as part of the self-nazification of churches, he wanted to collaborate with religious institutions. He also rejected claims that he was hostile towards religious authority amid accusation of Schmidt suppressing religion. As early as summer of 1942 a rapprochement with the Romanian population occurred among the ethnic Germans due to dissatisfaction with Schmidt and his leadership, which was only heightened by the defeat at Stalingrad. It was also driven by his anti-religious and anti-Christian views, with a notable example being him renouncing the religious service at his wife's funeral. He also helped stir up anti-German resentment by promoting the rights of ethnic Germans, even among the Iron Guard.

He helped negotiate the 12 May 1943 agreement between the Reich government and the Romanian government where Romanian-Germans were allowed a short-team leave to go volunteer with German troops.

==== Loss of favor ====
By early 1944 there was a split between Berger and Ernst Kaltenbrunner within the Volksgruppe leadership, which led to Schmidt having to force members of his staff to draw away from Berger because he promoted Berger's interests. This led to dissidents of Berger, Kurt Auner and Matthias Liebhardt launching a smear campaign against Schmidt, and Schmidt threatened to arrest both even though they were protected by Kaltenbrunner. He had also started to be viewed suspiciously by Romanian leadership, especially Antonescu, who believed he was aiming to turn Romanian provinces with German populations into Nazis protectorates, especially around the Danube. In addition he started to lose favor among Reich leadership because of an internal complaint later that year, as he was described as having excessive ambition by his coworkers, playing off individual Reich authorities against each other, sexual harassment, and making repeated statements against Kaltenbrunner. This led to authorities in the Reich recommending he be terminated from his office, although he was given the chance of rehabilitation during Operation Regulus. In June 1944 when many Swabians returned home from the front, they openly protested against the GEGR, stating they had been misled and lied to us when volunteering and blamed Schmidt.

The Reich government also received conflicting reports on intelligence from GEGR, Abwehr, and SD, as Schmidt tended to downplay unrest within the German minority which led to Schmidt not being seen as a reliable informant. By mid-1944, the RSHA's Militärisches Amt stated that Schmidt lacked control over the German minority and its affairs, and the SD started to sideline him as they doubted his competence. Especially as the GEGR promoted that it was stable, while Swabian returnees stated their dissatisfaction, many in the Reich doubted his legitimacy, leading up to the coup.

==== Writings as Volksgruppenführer ====
During his time as Volksgruppenführer, Schmidt wrote three books. The books were Nationalsozialistischer Volkstumskampf (National Socialist People's Struggle, 1942), Wir erziehen das neue Geschlecht! (We Educate the New Sex!, 1942), and Der Sieg des Sozialismus in Europa (The Victory of Socialism in Europe, 1944). They were all published by Krafft & Drotleff in Sibiu. His 1942 and 1944 books were put on the original literature to be discraded list, which was a list by the DDV of the Soviet-occupied Germany that confiscated literature related to the Nazi era, along with "We Educate the New Sex!", which was republished in 1943, in the first addendum published a year later.

=== Coup d'état and resistance ===
On 23 August 1944 the Romanian coup d'état occurred where Ion Antonescu was overthrown, and on 12 September an armistice was signed with the Soviets.

After the coup, Schmidt played an important role in a mission titled "Operation Regulus". This was ordered by the Reich in order to rehabilitate Schmidt, because of his reaction to Kaltenbrunner and for "abandoning" the ethnic group at a critical moment. His adversaries also accused him of deliberately ignoring the possibility of a German defeat, yet making arrangements for the evacuation of the ethnic German population in Transylvania, and because he left Romania on 21 August 1944 for Berlin and Vienna, which led to others to accuse him of fleeing to the Reich in anticipation of the coup. Operation Regulus was to be carried out by Legionnaires and German military, and the objectives were to contact circles in Romania who did not like Soviet occupation who remained in Romanian territory, collect and pass on information about the Red Army and the atmosphere in the country, and organize a pro-German, anti-Soviet resistance movement and organize a revolt. He proposed a partisan war behind Soviet lines, modeled after Operation Landfried, to have GEG leaders at the service of Otto Skorzeny and have them trained to parachute into Transylvania as commando units and get into contact with the SD.

On the night of 6 to 7 November 1944, he took part in the first jump of the operation to go to Brașov then to Bucharest and meet with SD agents Roland Gunne and Fritz Kloos. On 10 November 1944 Schmidt left Transylvania together with the legionary commander Stoicănescu and Iron Guard member Codreanu. His plane, however, crashed in southern Hungary but he went by foot 170 km to the Fagaras Mountains, where he stayed into February 1945, although he continued to frequent Brașov, Sibiu, and Bucharest. In an interrogation during March 1945 he said that the plane had been hit by Soviet rockets in Arad and caught on fire, so they tried to return to Vienna but they had to emergency parachute out of the plane.

He secretly left from Brașov on 9 February under the alias "caporal Bâtlan". In mid-March 1945, together with a Romanian lieutenant pilot from the Luftwaffe, he tried to reach Germany from Oradea but they were forced to land over Miskolcz, breaking both of his legs and he had to go to a military hospital. Their plane had crashed because a secret agent, a legionnare named Alexandru Ţăranu, revealed their identities as both were under false identities, which led to SMERSH intervening with two Romanian IAR 80 planes, causing a fire on board as it passed Debrecen. He was recognized at the military hospital, and was transported to Moscow. When they were taken to Moscow Schmidt was taken to Lubyanka prison for interrogation and then tried and condemned by Soviet tribunals.

== Relationship with the Evangelical Church ==
During his time as Volksgruppenführer, Schmidt was closely involved with attempts to self-Nazify the Evangelical Church of the Augsburg Confession in Romania. During the late 1930s, the bishop of the church was Viktor Glondys, with whom Schmidt did not like because he opposed Nazism. Due to this, Schmidt advocated for his dismissal, especially after in July 1938 the Nazi-aligned members of the church had gained a majority over the church's superior consistory. Glondys was eventually forced out of the post of bishop in September 1940. Soon afterward, in autumn 1940 Schmidt demanded the transfer of the schools and real estate of the Landeskirche of the church, which was granted with Decree-Law 977/1941, which he then pushed over the winter, and rejected requests for modifications of the text. As a replacement to Glondys, Schmidt eventually nominated Nazi-aligned pastor Wilhelm Staedel, referring to him as his comrade. Staedel himself had been part of Alfred Bonfert's Südostdeutscher Wandervogel, which was part of the greater Wandervogel movement that promoted German nationalism and was later head of the German Ethnic Group's Landeskulturamtsleiter (cultural department). Schmidt had orchestrated the installation by overriding church law, due to the fact that Staedel had previously been disqualified on disciplinary action, usurping the church's autonomy. Glondys was eventually replaced with Staedel as bishop on 19 July 1941, with Staedel receiving 60 of the 105 votes.

Staedel soon proved to be controversial in the church for distancing himself from the Old Testament, which eventually led to a debate where it was agreed that the Old Testament to be disregarded, which Schmidt approved. In an early summer report in 1942, Schmidt himself declared that the denominational and other youth organizations that came under the church's influence were eliminated. This occurred after the 39th General Assembly of the Landeskirche declared a "central resolution" between it and Schmidt's group. Staedel, in the resolution, stated his commitment to helping Schmidt, stating that the church would willingly be compliant with the Volksgruppe without resistance, giving Schmidt the rights to leadership, which Staedel declined to do. This led to further self-Nazification of the church, removing the church's influence on society. On 15 February 1942 the Special Service for German Education in Romania came under the Directorate for Private and Confessional Education, which led to Schmidt intensifying the church to relinquish control over confessional schools, which was coordinated between Staedel and Schmidt in August 1942. This process was finalized in 1943. However, Antonescu disapproved of these actions, which he thought were anti-religious propaganda, and ordered Schmidt to halt anti-Church actions, which he refused to comply with.

== Personal life ==
On 3 March 1941 he married Krista Berger in Berlin, she was the daughter of Gottlob Berger who was Head of the SS and responsible for recruiting SS members. Heinrich Himmler was his best man. They were both involved in a serious car crash in 1942, which led to her having serious injuries, but she gave birth a few months later to a son named Heidrun and died on 11 November 1942 from tuberculosis. However, it is theorized that this car crash never happened, and it was instead an attempt to hide that Berger had been suffering from lung disease, which was untenable to the SS and would've exposed Himmler. He re-married in 1944 to Adele Kaufmes at the Bristol hotel in Vienna after Berger's death. Kaufmes was born in 1924 as the daughter of a regional farm leader named Hans Kaufmes. Soon after, on 23 August, she gave birth to a son named Andreas.

=== Death ===
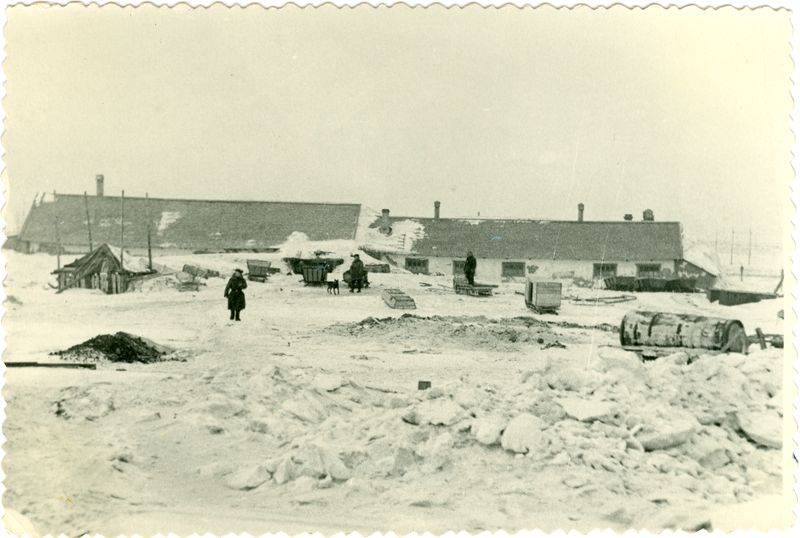
Vorkuta in 1947, a year before Schmidt's death, where he was imprisoned.

Schmidt died sometime in spring 1948 at Vorkutlag, a Soviet Gulag labor camp. It has been speculated that his death was the result of the prison's administration ordering some prisoners to beat him to death with axes during the night. Vladimir Sergeyevich Belkin, a Russian citizen, later relayed this and said that he had stood near the body alongside some night cooks after the murderers had left. A rumor, however, then spread the next day that Schmidt had died of typhus, which was rampant in the camp. Later reports said he was free and living in Moscow around 1951 as an advisor to the Soviets, but this is more than likely legend, and another version said he died in 1952 in a concentration camp in the Donbass from tuberculosis.

== See also ==
- Waffen-SS foreign volunteers and conscripts
