= German Party (Romania) =

Political party in Romania, active 1919–44

The German Party (German: Deutsche Partei in Rumänien; Romanian: Partidul German din România, PGR) was a political party in post-World War I Romania, claiming to represent the entire ethnic German community in the country, at the time it was still a kingdom.

== Overview ==
The German Party went through a rather lengthy period of creation. It was founded on the initiative of part of the ethnic German bourgeoisie at Timișoara on 6 September 1919, in advance of the November election. Gradually, it extended its organisations into Transylvania, Banat, Bukovina and Bessarabia, territories with appreciable numbers of Volksdeutsche. Its leadership organs were elected by general assemblies or by congresses. The party was the political expression of the Union of Romanian Germans (UGR, Uniunea Germanilor din România), which oversaw a wide range of activities (political, cultural, religious, economic). Although it claimed to speak for all local Germans, in reality the party overwhelmingly represented the interests of the wealthiest layer of that national minority.

The programme adopted in 1919 and which, in essence, remained the same for the entire interwar period, called for the application of the resolution adopted at the Alba Iulia National Assembly on 1 December 1918 regarding minorities, respect for the rights and liberties guaranteed by Romanian legislation, and the promotion of certain specific interests (cultural rights; maternal-language education; the right to found schools and other institutions maintained through special contributions paid by the German population; the right to associate for religious, cultural, economic, and other purposes). A core motivation was to secure recognition of the UGR by successive governments as a distinct entity within Romania, with the right to speak on behalf of all ethnic Germans. The PGR fought for an ever-larger representation of the German minority in Parliament as well as on county and communal councils.

The process of founding the PGR began in 1919 and ended in 1921. At first, Transylvanian Saxons created their own political parties (the Saxon Party - Partidul Sas, and the National Saxon Party - Partidul Național Săsesc), as did the Banat Swabians (Swabian Party - Partidul Șvab, and the National Swabian Party - Partidul Șvab Național). At the September 1921 Cernăuți Congress, the UGR was created, led by a National Council and with Rudolf Brandsch as its president. The Saxons, through the 8 January 1919 Mediaș resolution, and the Swabians, through the 10 August 1919 Timișoara resolution, joined the act of Union of Transylvania and Banat with Romania.

From a political point of view, the PGR adopted a strategy of collaboration with Romanian governments, no matter their political orientation, calculating that they could more easily achieve their specific demands in this way. The party took part in parliamentary elections on the side of the party in government (except in the 1927 election, when it allied itself with the Magyar Party), winning between 10 and 15 seats in the lower house every time. It had a significant number of communal and county councillors, and even mayors in localities with a sizeable German component. Brandsch, between 23 April 1931 and 20 October 1932, and Hans Otto Roth, between 4 July and 4 September 1940, were respectively Undersecretary of State and Minister for Minorities. The PGR organised numerous meetings, also editing a large number of newspapers and gazettes through which it promoted its political agenda. It official newspaper was the Siebenbürgisches Deutsches Tageblatt, published from 1919 to 1944.

After 1930, Nazi ideas began to seep into the party. The man who promoted this trend was Fritz Fabritius, who in September 1932 created the Movement for Reciprocal Assistance of Romanian Germans (Romanian: Mișcarea de Întrajutoare a Germanilor din România; German: Selbsthilfe), with a national-socialist orientation. In May 1933, Fabritius founded the National-Socialist Party of Romanian Germans (PNSGR, Partidul Național-Socialist al Germanilor din România), which propagated Nazi ideas and organised youth camps; members of this party wore uniforms and used the swastika as their symbol. So as not to be dissolved on the basis of the 9 December 1933 journal of the Ion Duca government, the PNSGR took the name Movement of National Renewal of Romanian Germans (NEDR, Mișcarea de Reînnoire Națională a Germanilor din România). The attempt at evasion did not go undetected and on 7 July 1934, the government decided to ban the work camps and disband the NEDR, as it was undertaking activities "banned by the laws in effect".

On 22 November 1933, Otto Fritz Jikeli, who continued Fabritius' ideas, was elected president of the National Saxon Council (Consiliul Național Săsesc), whereupon he declared himself a follower of the national-socialist conception. Some leaders challenged Jikeli, so that Fabritius personally took control of the National Saxon Council on 30 April 1935. On 22 October of that year Fabritius was elected president of the UGR, then of the PGR too. Dissent continued within the PGR: in April 1935, Alfred Bonfert founded the German People's Party, accusing Fabritius of having a conciliatory attitude toward the democratic leaders of the PGR. In the 1937 elections the German Party formed an electoral alliance with the governing National Liberals, and then, in advance of the 1938 elections (which never took place), with the governing National Christian Party.

The German Party, along with all other parties extant in Romania, was dissolved on 30 March 1938. However, it continued its activity at the cadre level, using the cover of the Romanian German Community (Comunitatea Germanilor din România), which joined the National Renaissance Front on 10 January 1939. On 27 October 1938, following orders from Nazi Germany, the PPGR and the PGR merged. On 21 November 1940, during the National Legionary State, when many thousands of German troops were on Romanian soil, the Ethnic German Group of Romania (GEGR, Grupul Etnic German din România) was founded and declared a "Romanian juridical person of public right". All Romanian citizens of German origin were officially inducted into the organisation; the representative of the "national will of the Ethnic German Group of Romania" was the National Socialist German Workers Party (NSDAP). After the Legionnaires' Rebellion was crushed in January 1941, NSDAP remained the sole legal political organisation in Romania until the Coup of 23 August 1944. The head of the GEGR and of the local NSDAP was Andreas Schmidt, named directly by Berlin, whose interests he represented. Some members of GEGR called for including Transylvania and Banat into a separate state – Donauland – which would be a protectorate of the Third Reich. The GEGR, which used terror against ethnic Germans who did not share its Nazi ideology, was disbanded by the decree-law of 7 October 1944.

== Notable members ==
- Rudolf Brandsch (president, 1919–1935)
- Fritz Fabritius (president, 1935–1938)
- Hans Otto Roth
- Fritz Konnerth
- Franz Krauter

== Electoral history ==
=== Legislative elections ===
Election	Votes	%	Assembly	Senate	Position
1920			10 / 366	2 / 166	9th
1926	part of PP-led alliance				
1927	part of BMG				
1928	part of PNȚ-led alliance		8 / 387	0 / 110	
1931	part of National Union		10 / 387	0 / 113	
1937	43,612	1.4	0 / 387	0 / 113	10th
