= Magyar Party (Romania) =

National Magyar Party Partidul Naţional Maghiar Országos Magyar Párt
- Leaders: Sámuel Jósika (1922–1923); István Ugron (1923–1926); György Bethlen (1926–1938)
- Founded: 28 December 1922
- Dissolved: 30 March 1938
- Ideology: Hungarian minority interests Transylvanian regionalism
- Political position: Centre

The Magyar Party (Hungarian: Országos Magyar Párt; Romanian: Partidul Maghiar, PM, officially Partidul Naţional Maghiar) was a political party in post-World War I Romania.

The party had a heterogeneous structure, including bourgeois and landowners, peasants, workers, intellectuals and city-dwellers. It had powerful organisations in counties with a Hungarian majority, among whom it had a substantial electoral influence.

The party wished to obtain complete autonomy for the areas inhabited by a majority of Hungarians and Székelys; it foresaw Hungarians handling administration and all social-cultural problems, but asked that Hungarian-language confessional schools be funded by the Romanian state at all levels. Its tactical line underwent a certain oscillation. In the years right after 1918, several Magyar political formations appeared, some calling for integration into the just-unified Romanian state, others not recognising the new realities settled through the Alba Iulia Resolution. After the June 1920 signing of the Treaty of Trianon, the Magyar Party, which declared itself the representative of all Hungarians in Romania, came to be established. After Hitler came to power in Germany and Miklós Horthy's régime sharpened its revisionist rhetoric, the party leadership more often than not took anti-Romanian stances, following the Budapest government's line.

== History ==
At the end of October 1918, the National Magyar Council (Romanian: Consiliul Naţional Maghiar, CNM) was founded at Cluj, while the National Democratic Hungarian-Szekler Party (Partidul Naţional Democrat Maghiar-Secuiesc, PNDM-S), led by Béla Maurer, was founded at Târgu Mureş. While the CNM hedged its bets, hoping for a change in the situation through the signing of a peace treaty, the PNDM-S decided to collaborate with the authorities and to participate in the November 1919 election, in which it received 8 seats in the Assembly of Deputies. PNDM-S also took part in the 1920 election, expressing its desire to take part in the country's political life and condemning its co-nationals' passive attitude. After the Treaty of Trianon was signed, Magyar political leaders changed their attitude. The October 1920 PNDM-S congress, which took place at Târgu Mureş, decided that the Hungarians of Romania should renounce its reserved attitude and stand beside all of Romania's inhabitants in the postwar nation-building process.

In January 1921, at Cluj, the wealthiest segments of the Magyar bourgeoisie and landowners formed the Magyar Union (Uniunea Maghiara, UM). On June 5 of that year, a petty bourgeois group meeting at Huedin formed the Hungarian People's Party (Partidul Popular Maghiar), with Ludovic Albert as president. UM entered talks with the new group, and the two merged on July 6, 1921. The new Magyar Union elected baron Sámuel Jósika as its president. On August 14, 1921, democratic political circles and the PNDM-S decided to create another party, called the Magyar People's Party (Partidul Poporului Maghiar). As the UM leadership did not recognise the act of union of Transylvania with Romania, it was disbanded by the government on October 30, 1921.

The faction belonging to the former Huedin party re-established the Hungarian People's Party on January 5, 1922, electing István Kecskeméthy as president and adopting a policy of integration into Romanian political life. At the same time, Emil Grandpierre founded the National Magyar Party (Partidul Naţional Magyar). At the insistence of Grandpierre and of other politicians, both sides came to look favourably on the idea of creating a single party, through the union of all existing formations. Thus, on December 28, 1922, the Magyar Party of Romania was founded at Cluj. It was led by the old Magyar aristocracy and sustained by solid banking institutions, a network of cooperatives, the church and a number of cultural organisations, and a sizeable press with a wide area of distribution.

Differences of opinion continued within the new party, with most members favouring participation in Romanian political life. One key element of the PM's activity centred on following and documenting errors and abuses committed by the authorities, and composing memoranda addressed to the League of Nations which declared that the Hungarian minority was being persecuted and that Romania was not respecting the treaty on minorities, asking the League to intervene and put an end to these persecutions. On October 31, 1923, the "Ciucea Pact" was signed with Octavian Goga and Constantin Bucşan, representatives of the People's Party. The agreement was also approved of by the Prime Minister of Hungary, István Bethlen. In the February 1926 communal elections, PM participated in an electoral alliance with the Liberals (PNL), managing to obtain numerous seats on communal and county councils. István Ugron, who favoured an exclusive collaboration with the PNL, broke the "Ciucea Pact" on February 1, 1926, yielding the post of president to count György Bethlen.

Opposition by the democratic circles in the PM, grouped around Miklós Krenner and the newspaper Keleti Újság ("Ştirile vestului" or "News of the West"), was powerfully manifested at the Gheorgheni Congress of February 26, 1926. The PM leaders decided to buy the newspaper and transform it into an official party publication, which it remained until 1938. In 1927, István Kecskeméthy and Károly Kós addressed an appeal "to the Magyar people of Transylvania" in which they stated that they had been "insulted with the most disgusting calomnies by the professional Magyar politicians and their mercenaries, and their most constant accusation was that we sold out to the Romanians". The two favoured stronger integration into Romanian political life and re-established the Hungarian People's Party. This was in large part also due to discontent in the face of the PM leadership's attempts to form the Hungarian German Bloc in an alliance with the German Party to contest 1927 election. The PM leaders, using pressure and corruption, managed to choke off the PPM's activity, accusing it of pursuing "the division of Hungarians". To avoid dissensions within the Hungarian minority, the following clause was introduced into its statute at the October 1928 Congress of the Magyar Party: "Every Romanian citizen of Magyar nationality or who considers himself a Magyar and who has reached the age of 20 automatically becomes a member of the Magyar Party." The joint list won 15 seats in the Chamber of Deputies and one in the Senate. The party ran on its own in the 1928 elections, emerging as the second largest bloc in the Chamber of Deputies and the Senate with 16 and three seats respectively.

However, political divisions continued even after this date. During the Congress itself, a dissident faction took shape, led by István Albert, which became the Independent Magyar Party (Partidul Maghiar Independent) and which ran unsuccessfully on its own lists in the 1931 election. In June 1933, the Magyar Opposition (Opoziţia Maghiară) formed within the PM; it took an openly leftist course, forming the Union of Hungarian Workers of Romania (MADOSZ) in 1934, with Sándor Szepesi (president) and Sándor Péter (general secretary) elected as leaders. MADOSZ followed the Romanian Communist Party's political line. In 1937, Gyárfás Kurkó became its president, and László Bányai, its general secretary. Also in reaction to the PM leadership's orientation, the Magyar Peasants' Party or the Smallholders' Party (Partidul Ţărănesc Maghiar / Partidul Micilor Gospodari) was formed in September 1935, led by dr. Imre Réthy, whose followers were especially numerous in Odorhei County. Initially, this party collaborated with the National Peasants' Party, then becoming closer to MADOSZ, with which it merged in November 1937.

The PM maintained its intransigent line, permanently criticising the policies of the Romanian state. At the last PM Congress, which took place in Târgu Mureş in November 1937, it was asserted that the Romanian government was promoting a policy of assimilation toward minorities, and of violating their rights and liberties of expression. In the 1937 election, the PM won 4.43% of the vote, 19 seats in the Assembly and 2 in the Senate. In advance of the 1938 election, the PM (with the Hungarian ambassador to Bucharest acting as intermediary) reached an electoral alliance with the governing National Christian Party. However, as the royal dictatorship was installed on February 10, 1938, this election never took place.

Dissolved, along with all other political parties extant in Romania, on March 30, 1938, the PM continued to exist under the name of the Magyar Community (Comunitatea Maghiară), which joined the National Renaissance Front in January 1939. After the Second Vienna Award of August 30, 1940, almost all PM leaders remained on territory ceded to Hungary, holding various political and administrative functions, and promoting a policy of harsh repression against the Romanian inhabitants of that land.

== Notable members ==
- Sámuel Jósika (president, December 28, 1922 – July 1923)
- István Ugron (president, July 1923 – April 1, 1926)
- György Bethlen (April 1, 1926 – March 30, 1938)
- György Bernady
- Emil Grandpierre
- István Kecskeméthy
- Miklós Krenner

== Electoral history ==
=== Legislative elections ===
Election	Chamber			Senate			Position
Election	Votes	%	Seats	Votes	%	Seats	Position
1926	part of PP-led alliance			part of PP-led alliance			
1927	part of BMG			part of BMG			
1928	172,099	6.2	16 / 387			3 / 110	3rd
1931	139,003	4.9	10 / 387			4 / 113	5th
1932	141,894	4.9	14 / 387			3 / 113	6th
1933	119,562	4.1	8 / 387			3 / 108	7th
1937	136,139	4.5	19 / 387			2 / 113	5th
