= Fritz Fabritius =

Transylvanian-Saxon politician (1883–1957)

Chairman of the Association of German Minorities in Europe
- In office February 1939 – November 1939
- Monarch: Carol II of Romania

Chairman of the German Party of Romania
- In office 29 June 1935 – 10 January 1939
- Monarch: Carol II of Romania

Chairman of the National-Socialist Party of Romanian Germans
- In office 22 May 1932 – July 1934
- Monarch: Carol II of Romania

Personal details
- Born: March 27, 1887 Sibiu, Transylvania, Austria-Hungary (now Sibiu, Sibiu County, Romania)
- Died: October 20, 1957 (aged 70) Rimsting, Bavaria, West Germany
- Party: German Party; NSDAP
- Spouse: Hermine Promper (m. 1907)
- Awards: Iron Cross, Third Class

Military service
- Allegiance: Austria-Hungary
- Branch/service: Austro-Hungarian Army
- Years of service: 1903-1907; 1914-1918
- Rank: Rittmaster
- Unit: Uhlan Regiment No. 7 Galicia (1903-1907)
- Battles/wars: World War I

Fritz Fabritius (27 March 1883 - 20 October 1957) was a Transylvanian-Saxon politician, ethnic group leader, and military officer. He served in numerous ethnic group roles embracing Nazism, including as Chairman of the National-Socialist Party of Romanian Germans (1932-1934), the German Party of Romania (1935-1939), and the Association of German Minorities in Europe (1939).

Fabritius was born in Sibiu, Romania, into a military family. He transferred to active military service in 1903, serving in the Uhlan Regiment No. 7 Galicia until 1907, when he switched to the reserves after achieving the rank of Rittmeister. He joined the military again on the outbreak of World War I. He was later sent on a trip to Germany, returning to Romania "full of enthusiasm" for then-unknown Adolf Hitler. Inspired by this, he founded the building society called Self-Help (Selbsthilfe) in 1922, which advocated for a home nation for Transylvanian Saxons, and which heavily embraced many Nazi Party sentiments. The society closed within a year, and Fabritius re-established it in 1927, where it grew rapidly, under to the influence of youth organisations, became more political. In 1932 it was transformed into the National Socialist Self-help Movement for Germans in Romania (NSDR), which was explicitly pro-Nazi. The organisation was banned multiple times by Ion G. Duca, a fierce opponent of far-right extremism, but still continued.

In 1935, Fabritius was elected Chairman of the German Party of Romania as a moderate, opposing Alfred Bonfert and Waldemar Gust. That year, a split occurred between the radical Nazis, led by Bonfert and Gust, and the moderate Nazis, led by Fabritius and Otto Jickeli. This effectively paralysed the party, as Romanian Germans were heavily divided. The dispute was finally resolved in October 1938 after talks by Edith von Coler, Germany's Special Representative who established Fabritius as chairman and the radical group merged into the party. In December 1938, Fabritius's party joined the Frontul Renașterii Naționale, which was founded by King Carol II. However, Fabritius was cast aside since he had sought autonomy and did not have good relations with the current regime. In February 1939, Fabritius became Chairman of the Association of German Minorities in Europe. Within a few months, he started endorsing a German empire, and Armand Călinescu accused him of forming paramilitary units loyal to him and endorsing the expansion of Germany into Romania. Fabritius was recalled to Germany after nearly being charged with high treason. He returned to Romania a few months later but resigned from his roles. This effectively ended his political career; although he was rehabilitated, he never sought political power again.

== Early life ==
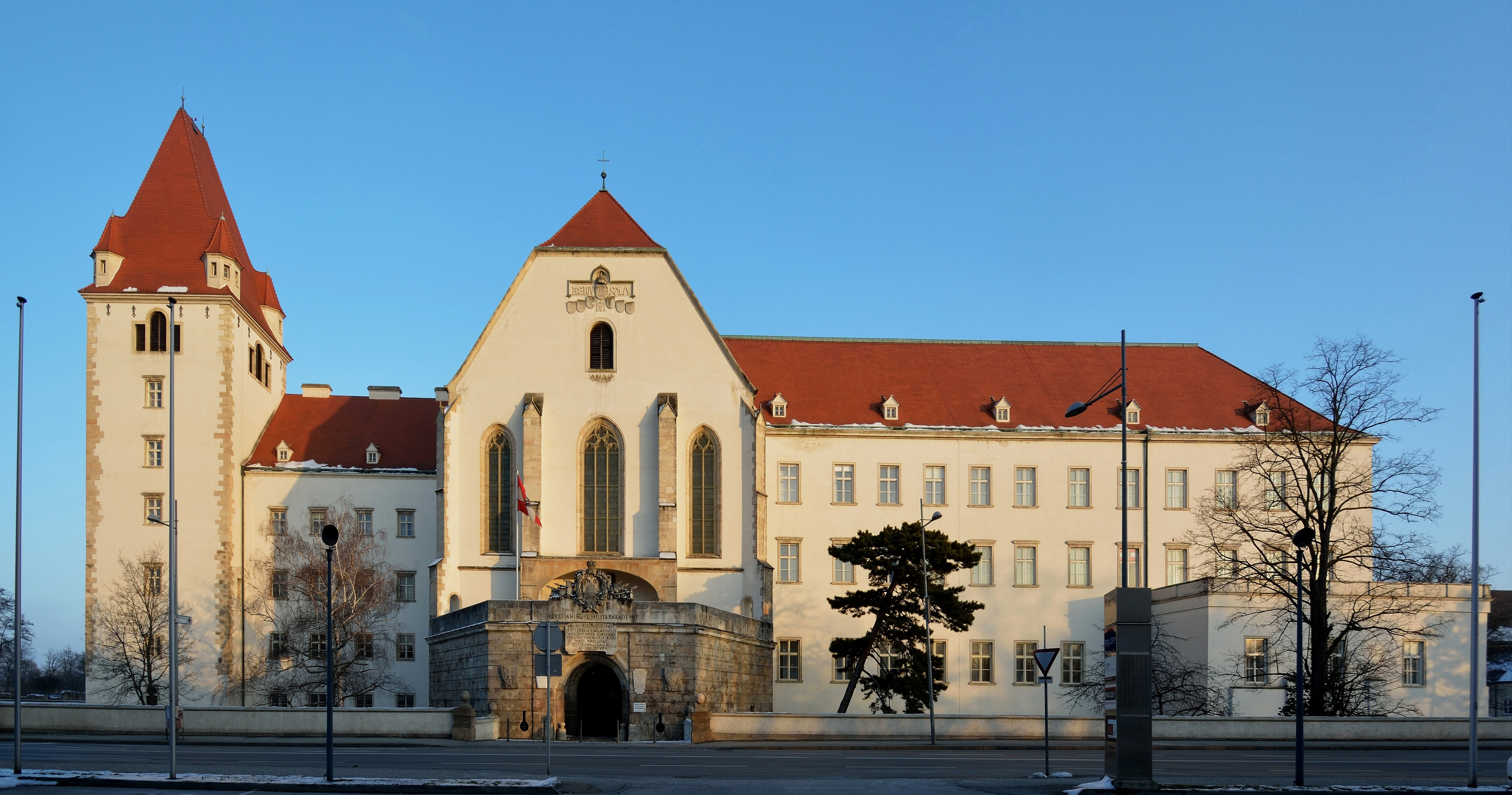
Fabritius attended the Theresian Military Academy for secondary school.

Fritz Fabritius was born on 27 March 1883 in Sibiu, Transylvania, Austria-Hungary. He was the son of a military sub-intendant and his wife Viktorine née Bielz, who was part of a patrician family. He was part of the ethnic minority of Transylvanian Saxons in Romania.

Fabritius first attended military schools in Košice and Hranice, later on attending the Theresian Military Academy for secondary school. At the academy, he received the rank of lieutenant on 18 August 1903 and was transferred to the military. He then served in the Uhlan Regiment No. 7 Galicia, and twice in brigade officer schools.

In 1907, he transferred to the reserves after reaching the rank of Rittmaster and moved back to Hermannstadt after marrying Hermine Promper. After moving to the reserves, he worked at the Hermannstädter Sparkasse, a credit bank, for seven years.

In 1912, Fabritius helped to found the "Transylvanian-Saxon Youth Brigade" in order to revive völkisch life. In August 1914, Fabritius left his job at the credit bank and returned to active duty in a lancers regiment at the start of the First World War, and was transferred to the dragoons, where he was awarded the Militärverdienstmedaille am Bande des Militärverdienstkreuzes two months later.

In October 1916, he was awarded the Iron Cross second class, alongside being awarded a "sword" to his Militarverdienstkreuz in February 1917. After he left, he rejoined Hermannstädter Sparkasse and worked closely with his client and confidant Carl Wolff, who shared his opposition to the state of Romania.

In 1918, he joined the genealogical association Deutscher Roland, which promoted Völkisch nationalism and anti-semitism. Alongside this, in 1921, he became a patron of Schirmherrschaft der deutschen Bauernhochschule, a German farmers' organization.

== Political career ==
=== Self-help movement (1922-1930) ===
In 1922, he traveled to Germany on behalf of Wolff to inform Wolff about the new economic conditions in Germany. He returned from the trip full of enthusiasm for a then-unknown politician named Adolf Hitler and proposed building a new society.

After his confidant Wolff's death in 1922, Fabritius lost his position at the bank since they only kept him due to his association with Wolff, so he lived off income from a farm until the end of 1922. Returning that year, he founded a building society called Self-Help (Selbsthilfe) in Sibiu. The goal, as explained by distributed leaflets from the society, was to build a home nation that was economically stable, achieve economic freedom and independence for Transylvanian Saxons, and not to become a tributary by providing cheap credit to them. In Autumn 1922, construction of the first housing project began for the society. The organisation also heavily embraced Nazi Party sentiments, although it never directly mentioned the movement.

The society was closed that same year after his newspaper for the society was unable to find printing. During this time, starting in 1926, he became an editor of the magazine Sachs halte Wacht, which was created for Transylvanian Saxons who were allies with the Reich. However, after a few years of absence, Fabritius refounded the self-help society in 1927. The organisation rapidly grew after its refounding, and by 1931 had capital of about 121 million lei. By 1930 the self-help organisation had moved away from a business association for Transylvanian Saxons and became prominently political. This was in part due to the influence of youth organisations that advocated for voluntary labour service and rural service. The most prominent of these organisations, the Good Templars (Guttempler), was an association of the Good Templars of Romania.

=== Renewal movement (1930-1935) ===
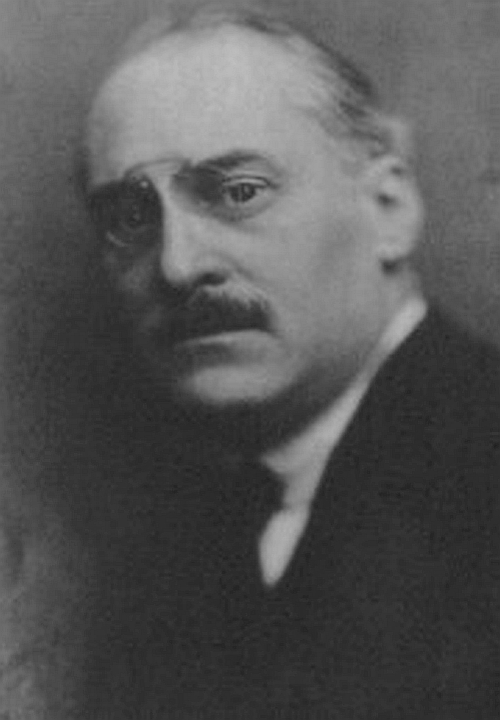
Ion G. Duca, who was a fierce opponent of Nazism, banned the NSDR multiple times.

In 1930, he renamed his self-help movement to the renewal movement. "Renewal" to him and many Saxons meant an effort to generate internally the power needed to confront danger from outside sources, and it was a word he commonly repeated to describe his goals.

On 22 May 1932, Fabritius officially founded the National Socialist Self-help Movement for Germans in Romania (Nationalsozialistische Selbsthilfebewegung der Deutschen in Rumänien; NSDR), with a twenty-five-point program oriented towards the Nazi model. Although it experienced a temporary setback of being banned by the government because of its rhetoric on 29 November 1933, the movement continued. Ion G. Duca, the Prime Minister, had previously declared a "revolutionary state" to tackle far-right extremism, citing NSDR's acts of homage to Germany, their influence by Nazis, their marches in uniforms, and vocal disagreement about the German Party's moderate electoral agreements. Just ten days later, however, it was re-formed as the National Movement for Renewal of the Germans in Romania (Nationale Erneuerungsbewegung der Deutschen in Rumänien; NEDR), allowing it to exist until it was banned again in July 1934.

=== German People's Community in Romania (1935-1938) ===
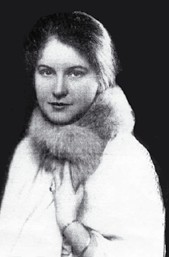
Edith von Coler in 1931. In 1938, she reconciled the moderate and radical groups of the Romanian Germans.

On 29 June 1935, after having headed the NEDR, Fabritius was elected Chairman of the German Party of Romania. This was prompted by Fabritius realising that the more radical Romanian Germans wished to remove him from power, so he joined the moderate group around Otto Fritz Jickeli when the NEDR collapsed with moderates around Fabritius and Jickeli and radicals around Alfred Bonfert and Waldemar Gust. Thus, due to his more moderate stances, Fabritius was elected in a general meeting in Bucharest with the support of the deputies of the People's Council of Bukovina, Bessarabia, a majority of the Saxon deputies, and one-third of the Swabian deputies. Upon being elected, he renamed the organisation to Volksgemeinschaft der Deutschen in Rumänien.

Only a few months before Fabritius was elected, the split between the moderates and radicals had gotten worse. Bonfert founded the German People's Party (PPGR) on 10 February 1935, which included most of Fabritius's opponents, leading to disorganisation and a split within the Nazi Romanian Germans. With the quarrel, Romanian German families were divided, children shouted in the streets that either Fabritius or Bonfert should rule, and battles occurred in cities. According to Tudor Georgescu, the "next three years descended into bitter feuding between the movement's moderate and radical wing", paralysing the party.

Until 1938, the party remained divided. However, on 26 October 1938, when Germany's Special Representative in Romania, Edith von Coler, responded, the problem was finally reconciled. Coler invited him and Helmut Wolff, Chairman of the People's Council for Transylvania, to her apartment to talk to the legation councillor Stelzer. Then on the next day, Coler invited Bonfert, Gust, and Hans Kaufmes, the regional farmer's leader, to the apartment of Artur Konradi, who was regional group leader of the NSDAP's foreign organisation in Romania. That evening, on 27 October, an agreement was concluded where Fabritius was affirmed as chairman of the organisation, and the German People's Party was dissolved and incorporated into Volksgemeinschaft. Due to this unity, the new organisation met in a massive rally on 6 November 1938 in Timișoara, with an attendance of 10,000, where he announced that the organisation now disavowed autonomy but demanded some concessions from the Romanian government.

Eventually, on 15 December 1938, King of Romania Carol II founded the National Renaissance Front (Frontul Renașterii Naționale; FRN), and Volksgemeinschaft attempted to negotiate entry into the organisation, which was denied by the government, which insisted on individual entry. Fabritius then resisted this, believing it was intended to divide the minority, despite pressure from the government. The group formally joined the FRN on 10 January 1939 alongside receiving state recognition. Fabritius was then recalled to Germany and was replaced by Wolfgang Bruckner and, after a transitional period, Andreas Schmidt, because he did not have good relations with the regime of Carol and the fact that he had sought autonomy as opposed to unity.

=== Association of German Minorities in Europe (1939) ===
In February 1939, Fabritius was elected Chairman of the Association of German Minorities in Europe (Verband der deutschen Minderheiten in Europa), succeeding Sudeten German Konrad Henlein.

Early in July 1939, he gave a speech in Munich calling for a future German empire. This culminated in a report of a meeting on 13 July 1939 with Armand Călinescu, who accused him of forming paramilitary units that took an oath of allegiance to him and endorsing the expansion of Germany into Romania. Only the intervention of the plenipotentiary minister, Fabricius, prevented an indictment of Fabritius for high treason. Perhaps the most incriminating thing that he mentioned was that Fabritius had adopted the unconstitutional title of Landesführer, which was viewed as reminiscent of "head of state".

On 14 August 1939, Fabritius arrived in Berlin, where he was informed that the Romanian government was preparing for his arrest, and he was ordered to stay in Germany as he was endangering Germany and Romania's relationship. In November 1939, he returned to Romania, where he was criticised for his "spa stay" in Berlin, and then continued to resume his duties. However, on 5 December 1939, a statement appeared in the press that Fabritius had resigned as Chairman of the German Party and of the Association of German Minorities in Europe.

=== Arrest and rehabilitation ===
For the next few years, with his career effectively having ended, he played no role besides being rehabilitated by Andreas Schmidt. He lived on an estate in Jaszczurowa, which is near Bielsko. After the war, he was sent to the Deggendorf internment camp, but was rehabilitated before a court in Nuremberg. He spent the last few years of his life in the "Transylvanian Home" in Rimsting, where he died.

== Personal life ==
While serving in the Uhlan regiment, Fabritius met Hermine Promper in Stockerau. He married Promper in 1907, after he had moved to the reserves.
