= Hungarian German Bloc =

Political alliance in Romania

The Hungarian German Bloc (Romanian: Blocul Maghiar-German, BMG) was a political alliance in Romania.

== History ==
The alliance was formed by the Magyar Party and the German Party in order to contest the 1927 general elections. It received 6% of the vote, winning fifteen seats in the Chamber of Deputies and one in the Senate, emerging as the third-largest bloc in Parliament.

== Electoral history ==
=== Legislative elections ===
Election	Votes	%	Assembly	Senate	Position
1927	173,517	6.4	15 / 387	1 / 113	3rd
