= 1927 Romanian general election =

- 7–14 July 1927

All 387 seats in the Chamber of Deputies All 110 seats in the Senate
- Turnout: 77.0% (▲2.0pp)
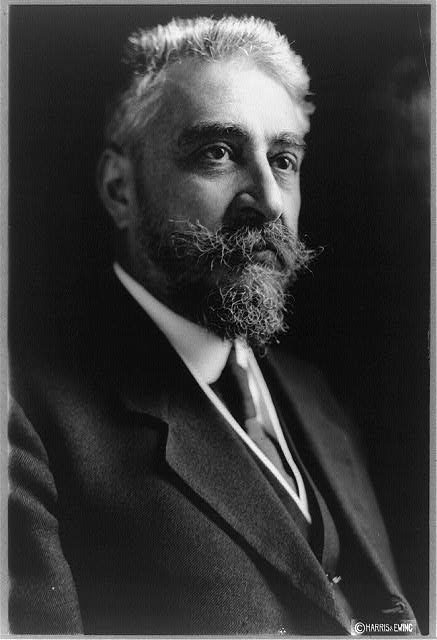

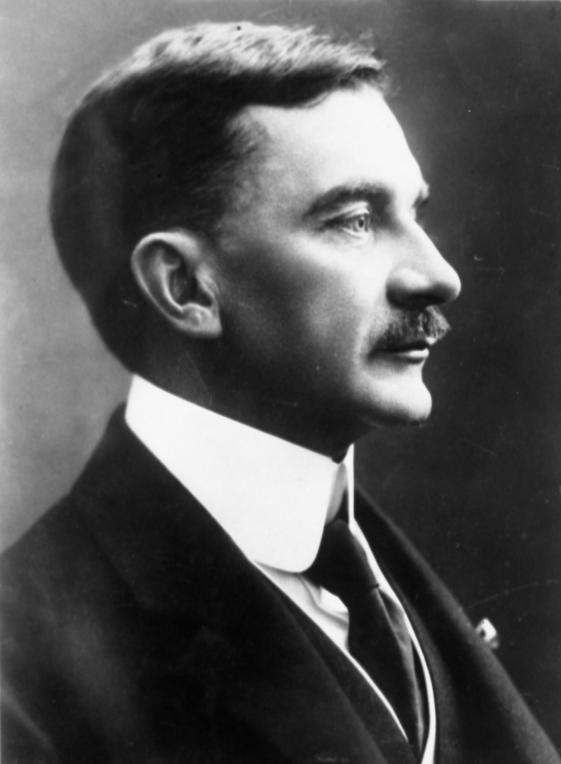

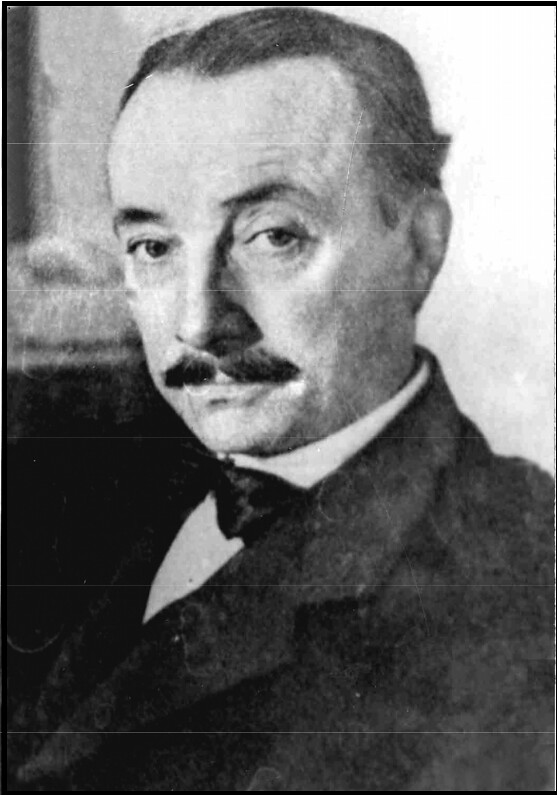
	First party	Second party	Third party
Leader	Ion I. C. Brătianu	Iuliu Maniu	György Bethlen (pictured) and Rudolf Brandsch
Party	PNL	PNȚ	BMG
Leader since	11 January 1909	10 October 1926 (party foundation)	1 April 1926 (Bethlen); 6 September 1919 (Brandsch)
Last election	0 S 16 D, 7.5%	–	–
Seats won	92 S / 318 D	17 S / 54 D	1 S / 15 D
Seat change	▲92 S / ▲302 D	New	New
Popular vote	1,704,435 D	610,149 D	173,517 D
Percentage	62.7%	22.5%	6.4%
Swing	▲55.2pp	New	New
Prime Minister before election
Ion I. C. Brătianu
PNL
Subsequent Prime Minister
Ion I. C. Brătianu
PNL

General elections were held in Romania in July 1927. The Chamber of Deputies was elected on 7 July, whilst the Senate was elected in three stages on 10, 12 and 14 July. The result was a victory for the governing National Liberal Party (PNL), which won 318 of the 387 seats in the Chamber of Deputies and 92 of the 110 seats in the Senate elected through universal male vote.

== Results ==
=== Chamber of Deputies ===
Party	Votes	%	Seats	+/–
National Liberal Party	1,704,435	62.72	318	+302
National Peasants' Party	610,149	22.45	54	New
Hungarian German Bloc	173,517	6.39	15	New
People's Party	53,371	1.96	0	–292
National-Christian Defense League	52,481	1.93	0	–10
Romanian Social Democratic Party	50,059	1.84	0	0
Peasant Workers' Bloc	31,505	1.16	0	0
National Party	28,157	1.04	0	New
Legion of the Archangel Michael	10,761	0.40	0	New
Traders Council	154	0.01	0	0
Other parties	2,884	0.11	0	–
Total	2,717,473	100.00	387	0
Valid votes	2,717,473	98.36		
Invalid/blank votes	45,306	1.64		
Total votes	2,762,779	100.00		
Registered voters/turnout	3,586,086	77.04		
Source: Sternberger et al., Nohlen & Stöver

=== Senate ===
Party	Seats	+/–
National Liberal Party	92	+92
National Peasants' Party	17	New
Hungarian German Bloc	1	New
Other parties	3	–
Total	113	–2
Source: Nohlen & Stöver
