= German People's Party (Romania) =

Romanian political party representing ethnic Germans

The German People's Party in Romania (German: Deutsche Volkspartei in Rumänien; Romanian: Partidul Poporului German din România, PPGR) was a political party which was active in the Kingdom of Romania between 1935 and 1938, claiming to represent the entire ethnic German community of the country.

== History ==
Alfred Bonfert founded the PPGR on April 22, 1935, in a split with the Nazi-oriented German Party, whose president he accused of having a conciliatory attitude toward the party's democratic leaders, and which he denounced as Judeo-Communist during the next few years. The party's base was the Volksdeutsche bourgeoisie, influenced by Nazism. It was organised on the Hitler-created model, with a paramilitary system in which the cadres were named by superior hierarchical organs. It ran three official newspapers: Der Stürmer (Timișoara), Ost-deutscher beobachter (Sibiu) and Sachsenburg (Brașov).

In its programme of 1935, the PPGR asked for the 1923 Constitution to be respected, as well as for cultural autonomy for the local German community. Besides its programme, the party's practical activity entailed cultivating a German (in this case Nazi) spirit among the Germans of Romania, and implanting each one of these with the idea that he represented an element, living abroad, of the Great Reich, whose interests he had to serve. The PPGR was hostile to Romanians and tried to isolate ethnic Germans from the general population. It adopted an intransigent attitude toward the country's governments, disavowing collaboration and pursuing a policy of confrontation toward them. A veritable fifth column for the Reich, it was never very popular, gaining under 1% of the vote at the 1937 election despite Germans forming over 4% of the population.

=== Dissolution ===
The German People's Party, along with all other parties extant in Romania, was dissolved on 30 March 1938. On 27 October 1938, following orders from Berlin, the remnants of PPGR were merged with the German Party.
