= Yisrael Guri =

Israeli politician(1893-1965)

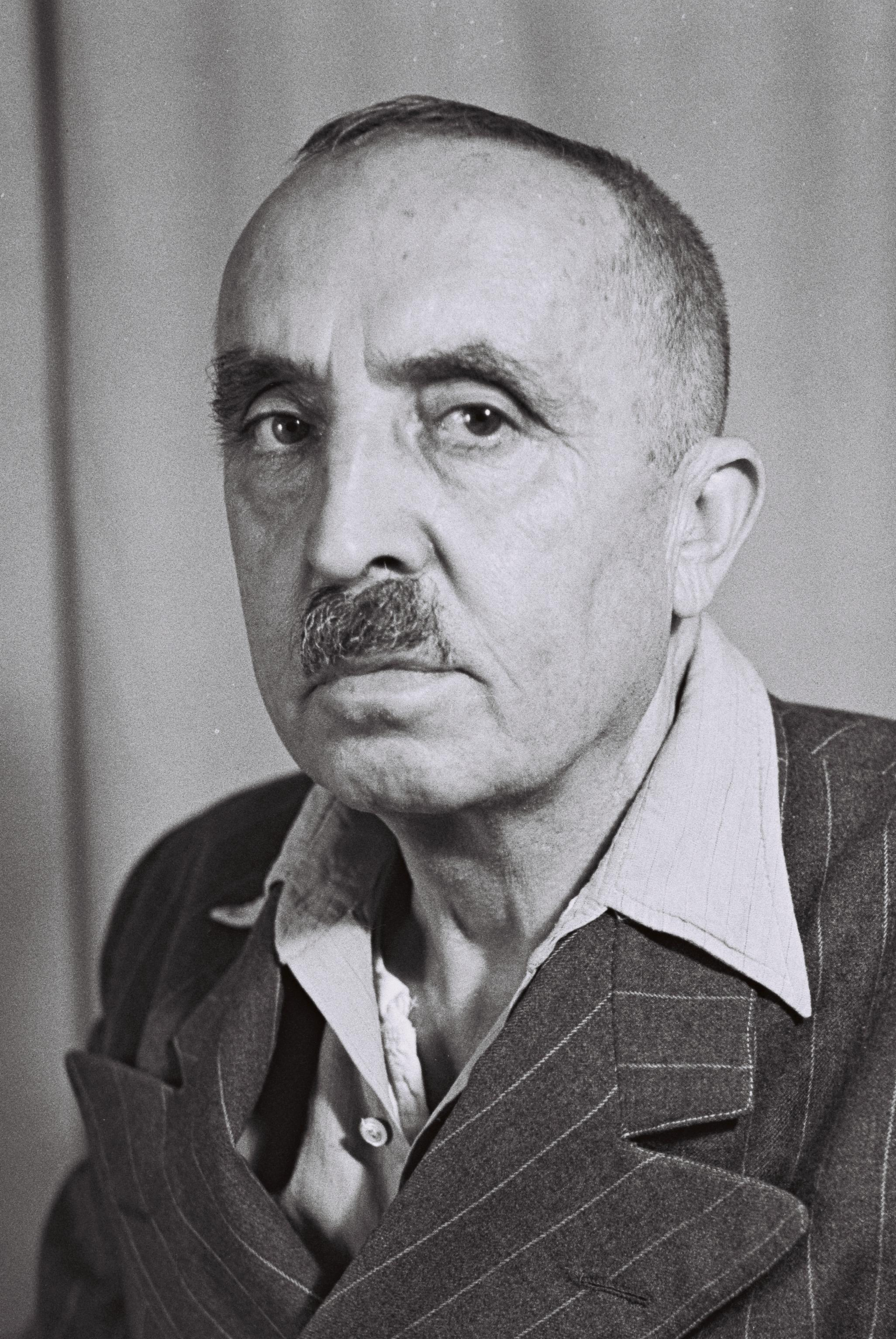
- Guri in 1951

Faction represented in the Knesset
- 1949–1965: Mapai

Personal details
- Born: 1893 Hirişeni, Russian Empire
- Died: 17 September 1965 (aged 71–72)

Yisrael Guri (Hebrew: ישראל גורי; 1893 – 17 September 1965) was an Israeli politician who served as a member of the Knesset for Mapai between 1949 and 1965.

== Biography ==
Born Yisrael Gurfinkel in Hirişeni, Orgeyevsky Uyezd, Bessarabia Governorate, Russian Empire (in present-day Moldova), Guri was educated in a heder and a high school in Chişinău, where he was a member of Tzeiri Zion, before attending the University of Odessa. In Odessa he married his wife Gila and became secretary of the local branch of the Jewish National Fund and of the Urban Zionist Committee.

He emigrated to Palestine in 1919 and was a member of Hapoel Hatzair. Between 1922 and 1931 he was a member of Tel Aviv Workers Council. In 1923 his son Haim was born, who became later a writer. Yisrael served as a member of the Assembly of Representatives, and was secretary of the Central Controller Committee of the Histadrut trade union. In 1929 he became a member of Tel Aviv City Council, a role he retained until 1950, and in 1935 became a member of its Cultural Department.

In 1949 he was elected to the first Knesset on the Mapai list. He was re-elected in 1951, 1955, 1959 and 1961. He died in September 1965 while still serving as an MK. The main street of the Kiryat Shalom neighbourhood in south Tel Aviv is named after him.
