= Wooden church of Hirișeni =

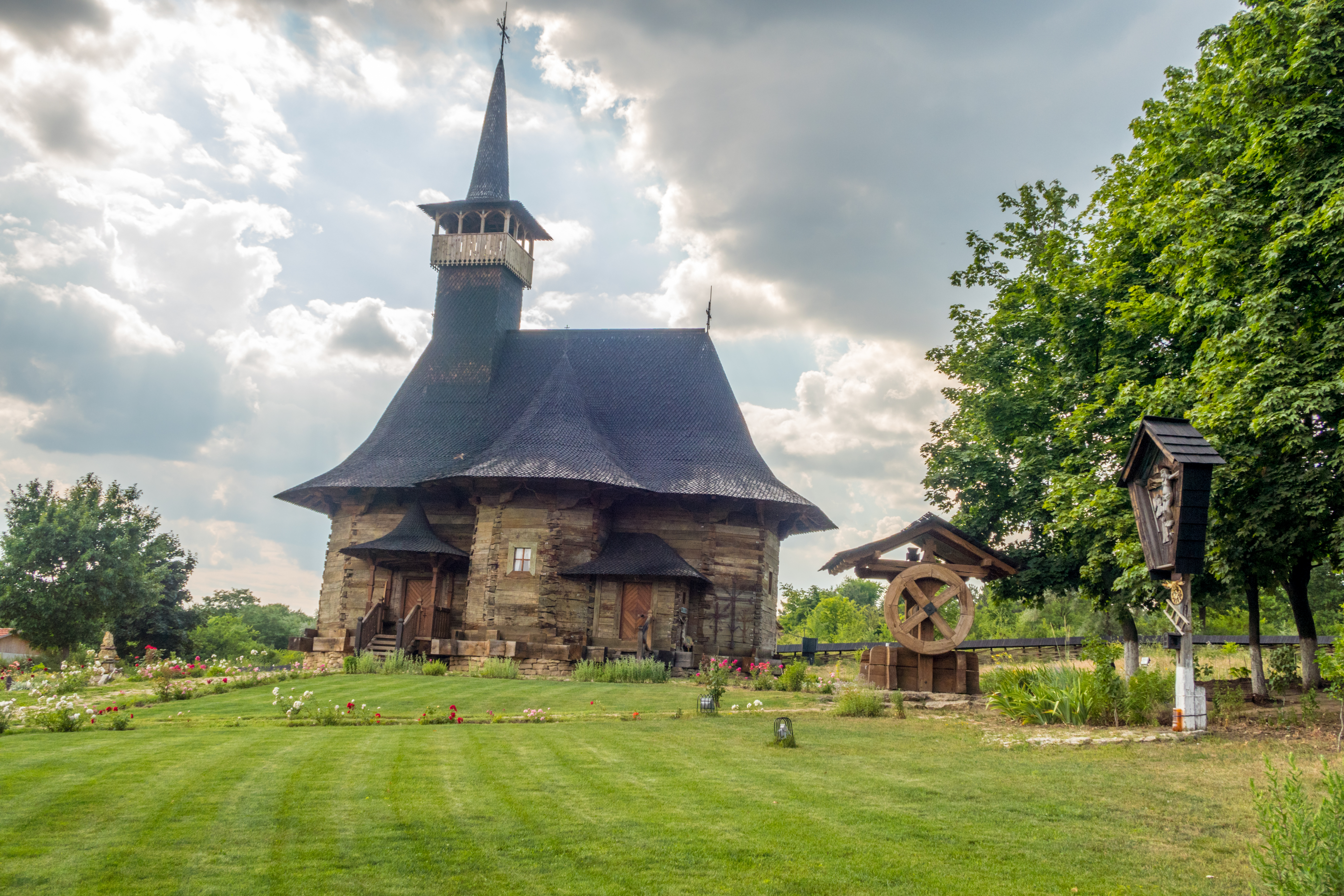
- Church in the summer of 2015
- Interactive map of Wooden church of Hirișeni
- Location: Village museum of Chișinău
- Coordinates: 46.9724°N 28.8737°E
- Type: church
- Material: wood
- Height: 27 metres (89 ft)
- Beginning date: 1642
- Restored date: 2009

Wooden church of the Dormition of Mary of Hirișeni is a religious building built in 1642. As of today, the church is preserved in the Village museum of Chișinău, Republic of Moldova.

The church was erected in 1642 by the people of Hirișeni, and was initially located in the Hîrjauca Monastery. It was relocated to Hirișeni commune of Telenești District, where it was used until 1928, when a stone church has been erected in the commune. People continued to visit the wooden church as a place for paraklesis near the cemetery.

By the beginning of the 21st century, the building was in a very bad state. It had no roof, and the wooden walls were damaged by rain and snow. The Ethnography Museum of Chișinău started negotiating with the people of Hirișeni on the relocation of the building to the capital city. Eventually, they agreed, and the relocation took place in 2009, when the restoration work started. The restoration project was supervised by architects Eugen Bâzgu and Sergiu Vornicov, and the work was performed by the same team that restored the wooden church of Palanca (Hîrjauca commune), Călărași District. The restoration team preserved as many original elements as possible, so they used the original woodwork and processed them with special materials to improve the durability. The roof was built from scratch.

The church was sanctified in the autumn of 2011, with the patron saint of Assumption of Mary. It is the oldest religious historical monument of the Republic of Moldova, and also the largest wooden church in the country, topping at 27 meters. Varvara Buzilă, secretary of the Ethnography Museum, stated that the church was the only one of its type in the Republic of Moldova at that point in time (2011). She said: "The Northern Moldovan style of this church makes her similar to the churches of Bukovina. We do not currently have any other church of this type, that would have a similar height or similarly good proportions." There was once a similar church in Telenești District, but it's been demolished in the 1980s.

== Gallery of images ==
=== Dismantling of the old church ===
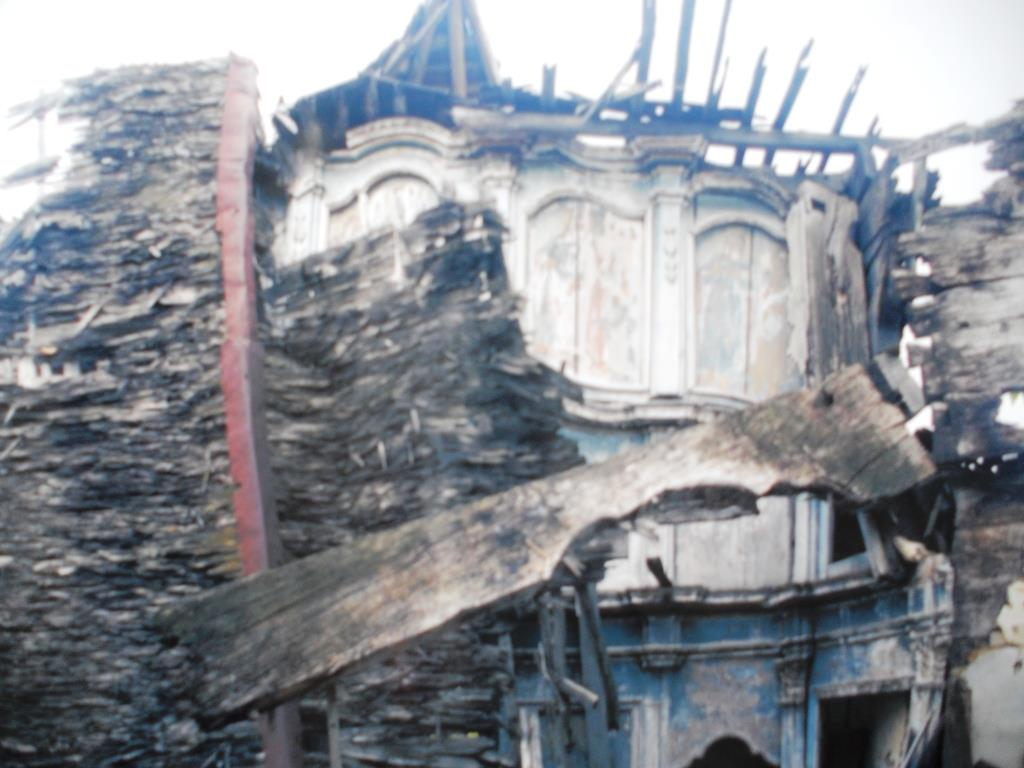

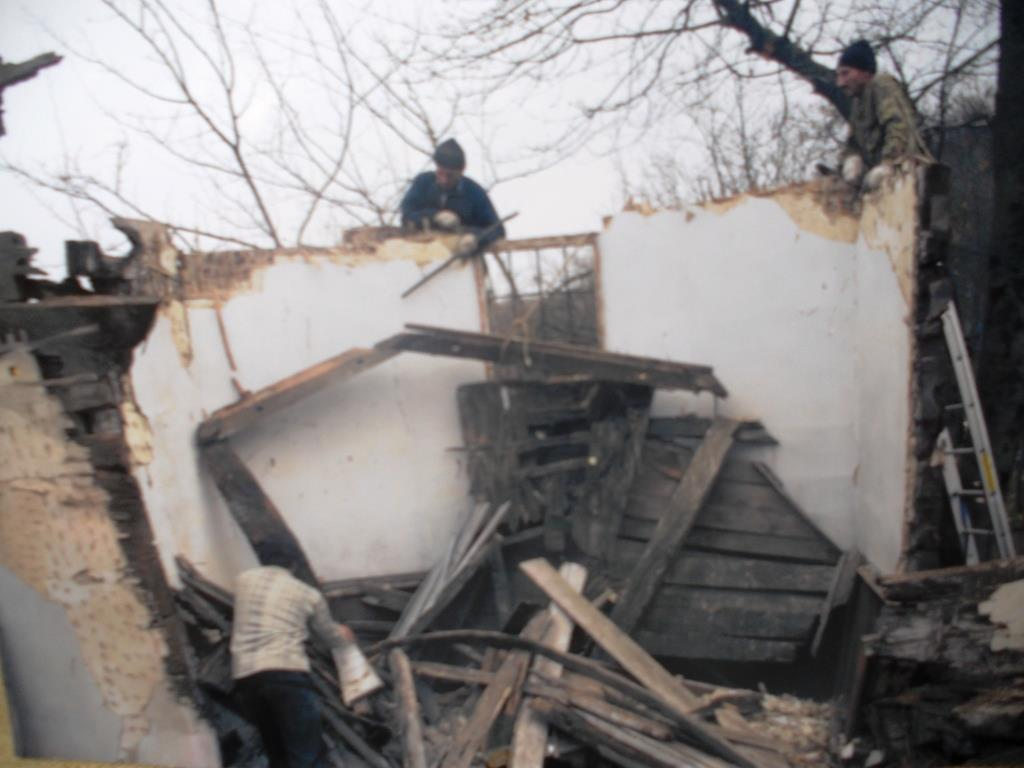

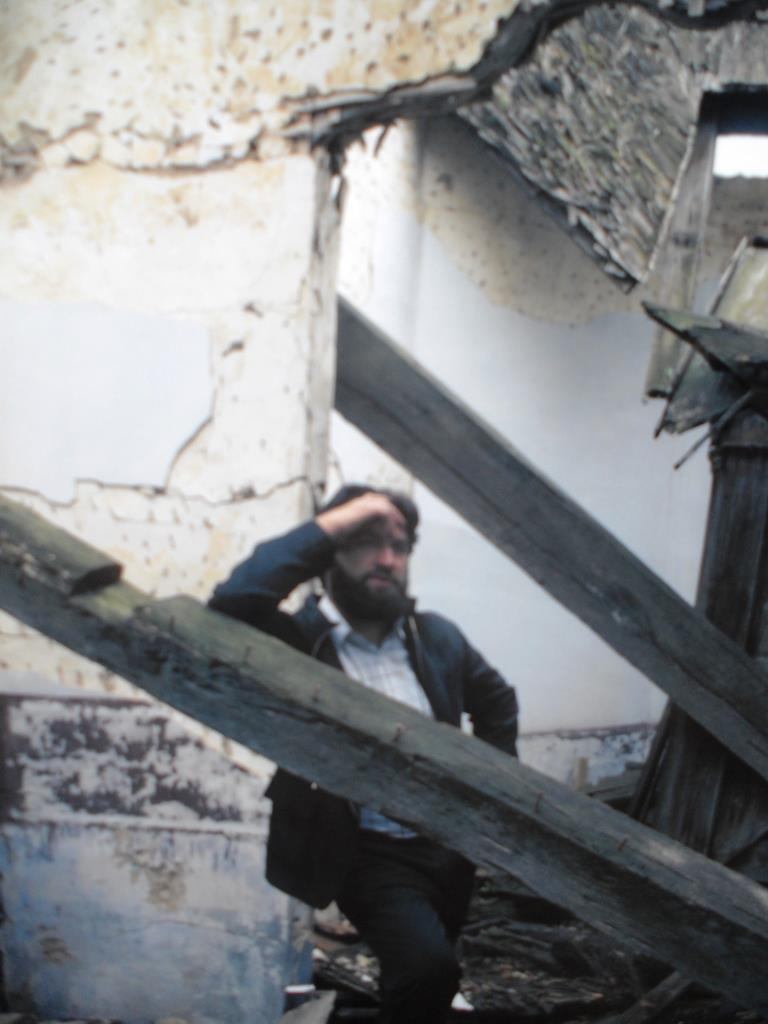

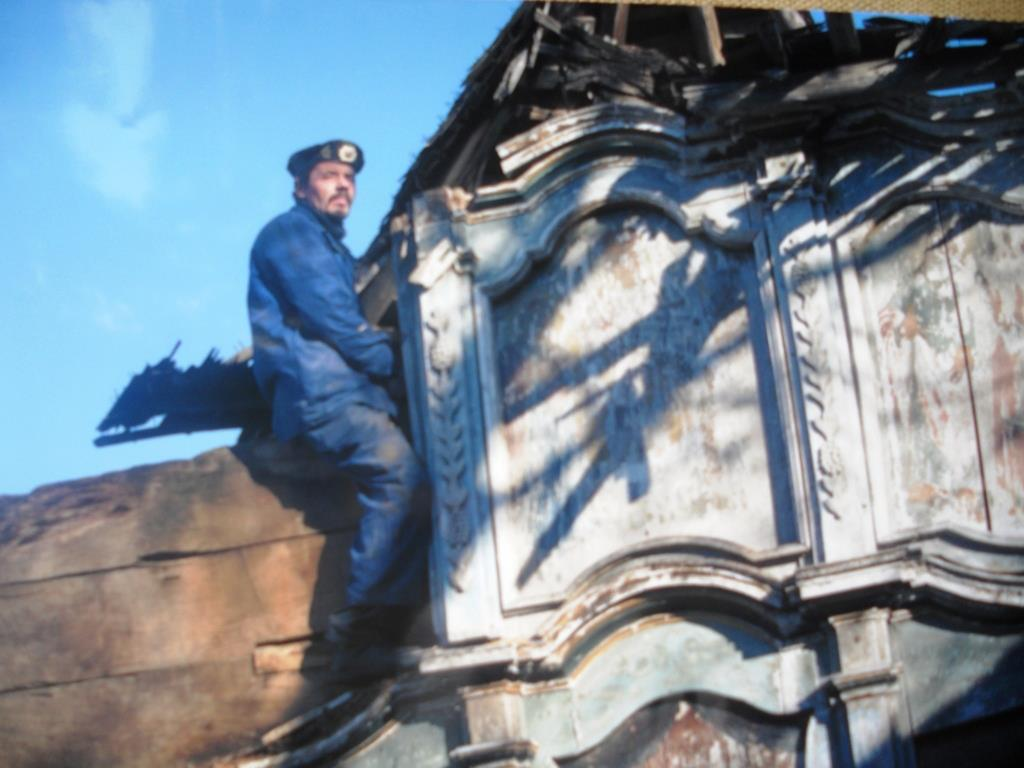

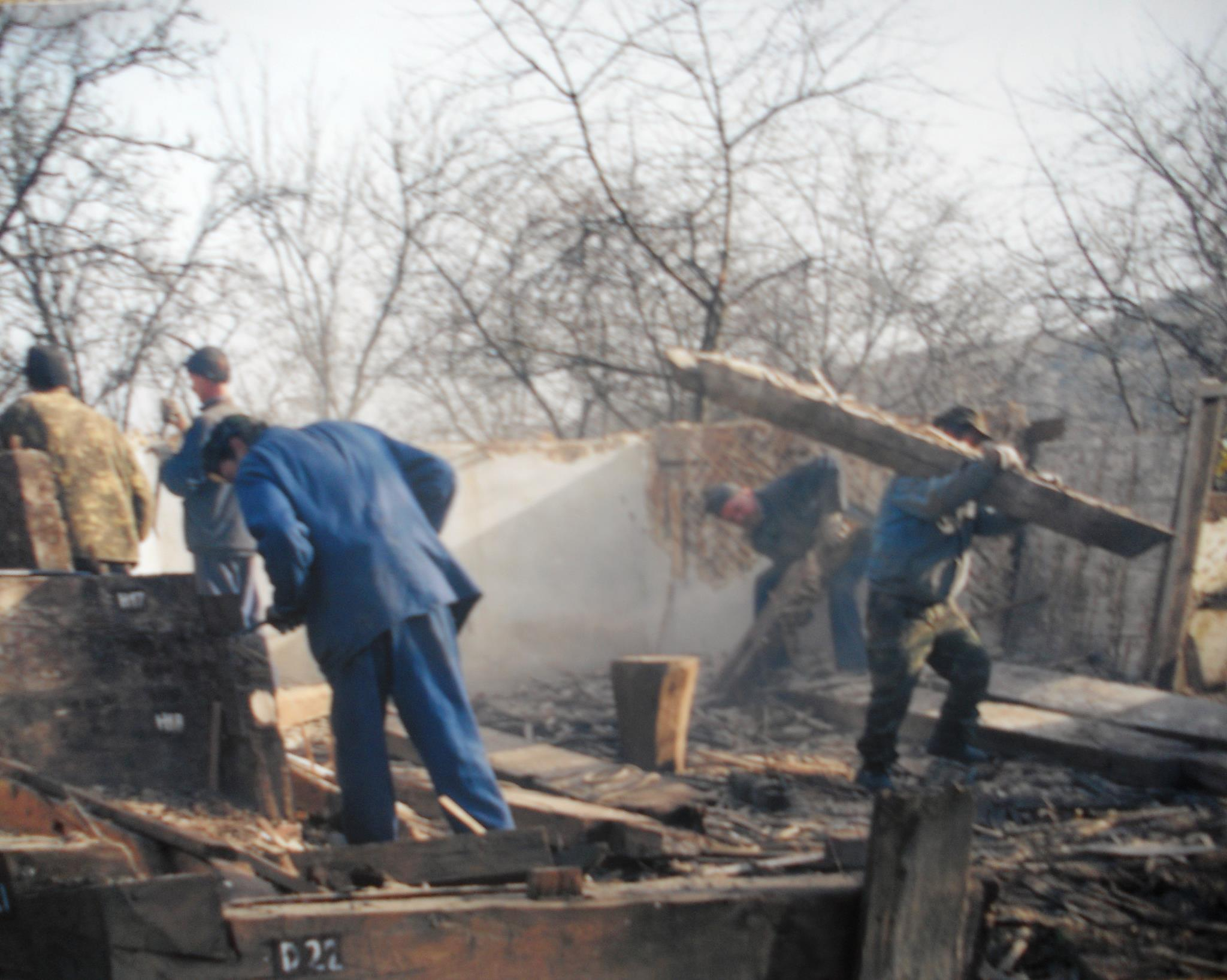

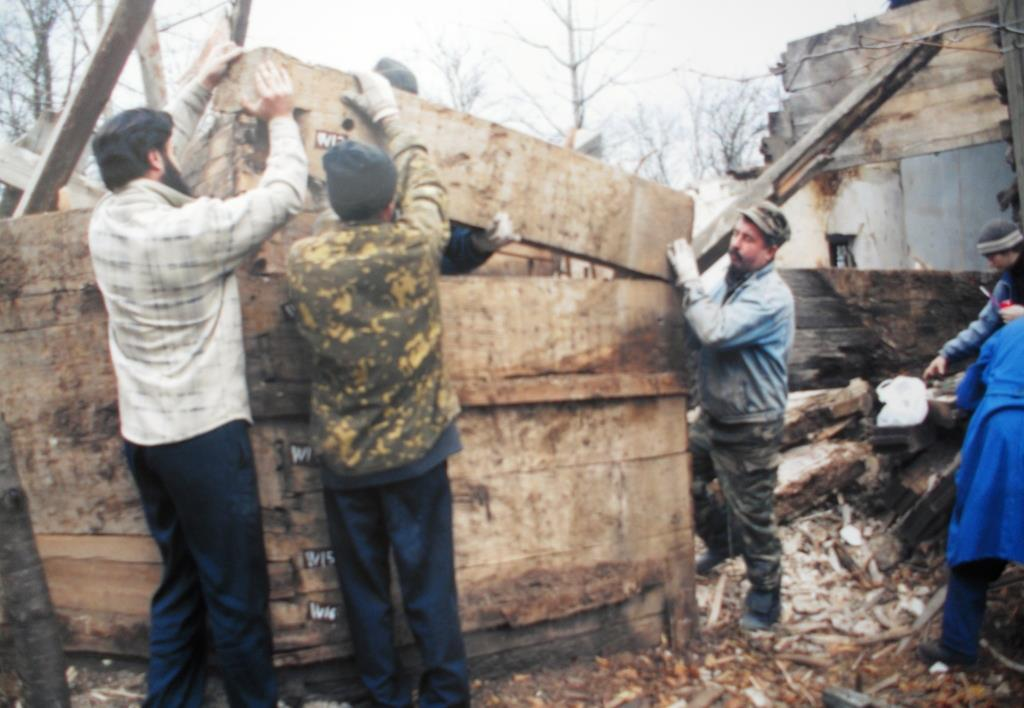

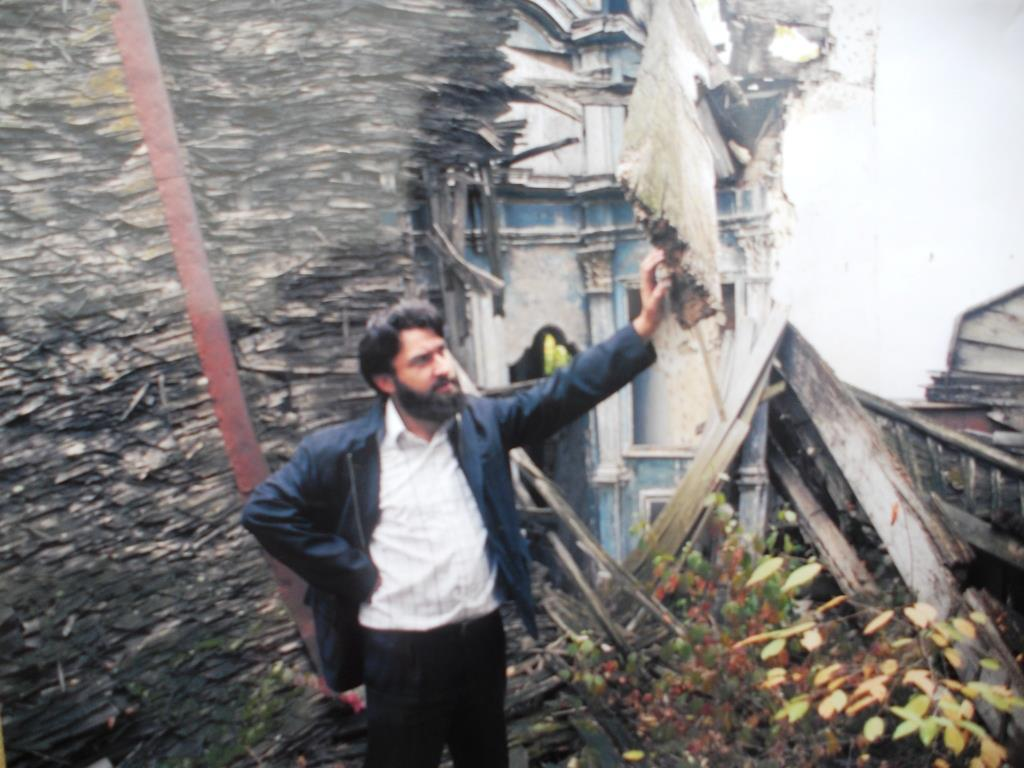

=== Restoration ===
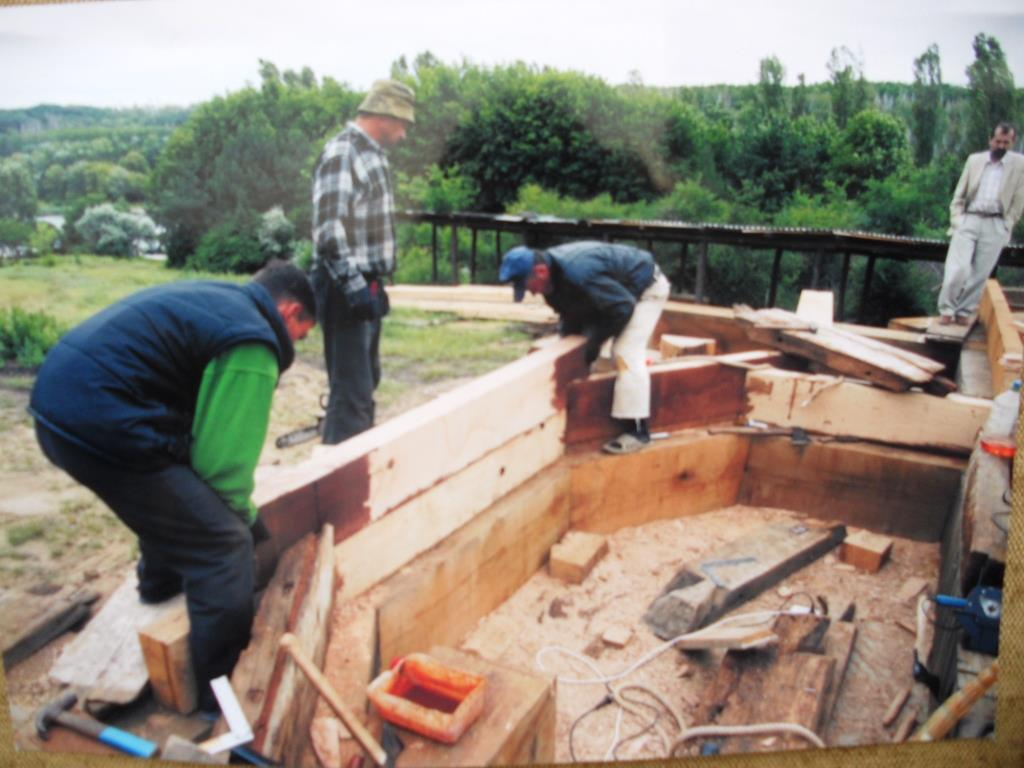

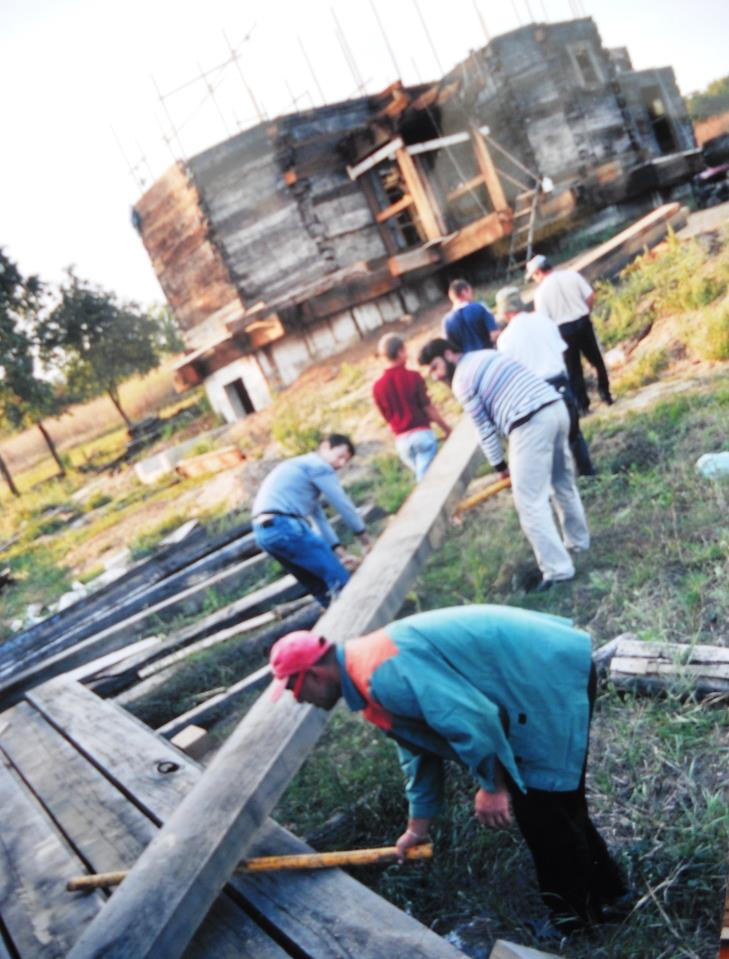

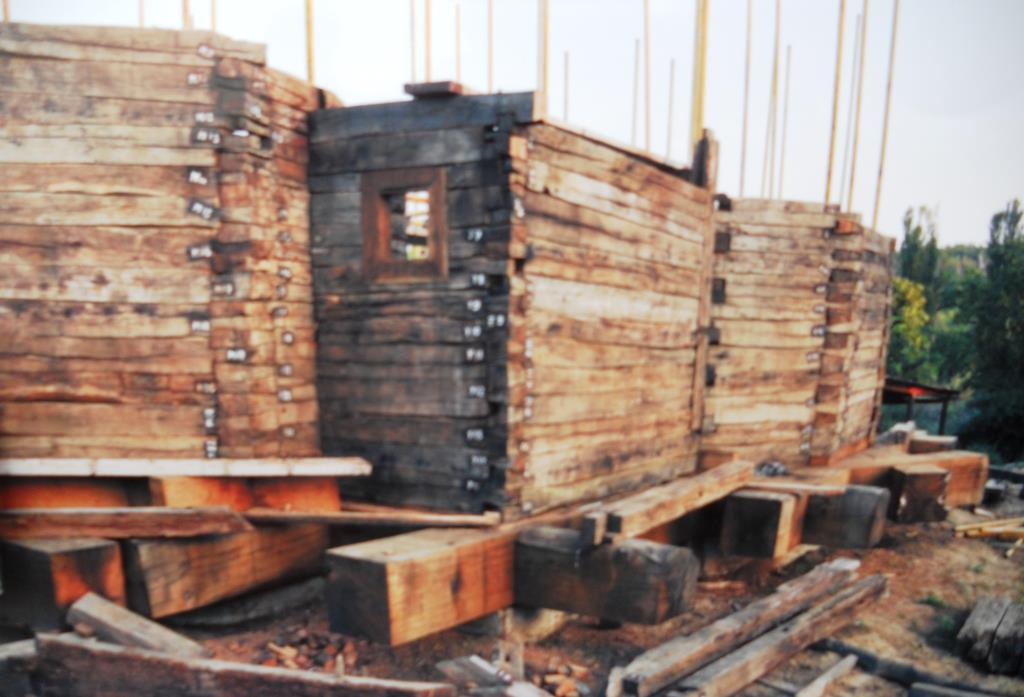

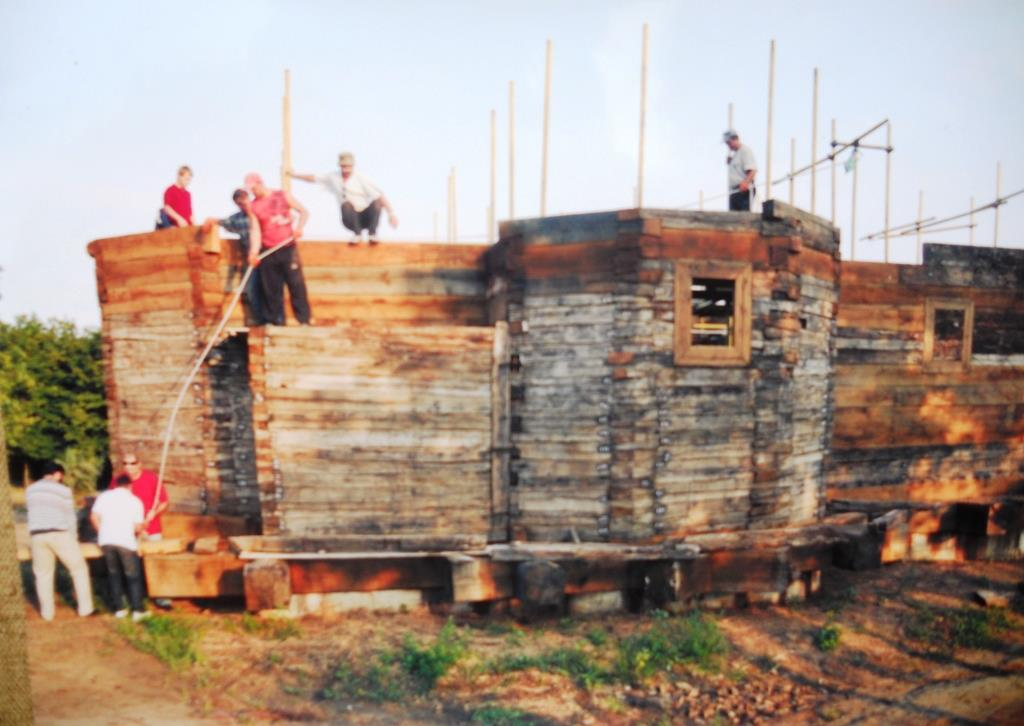

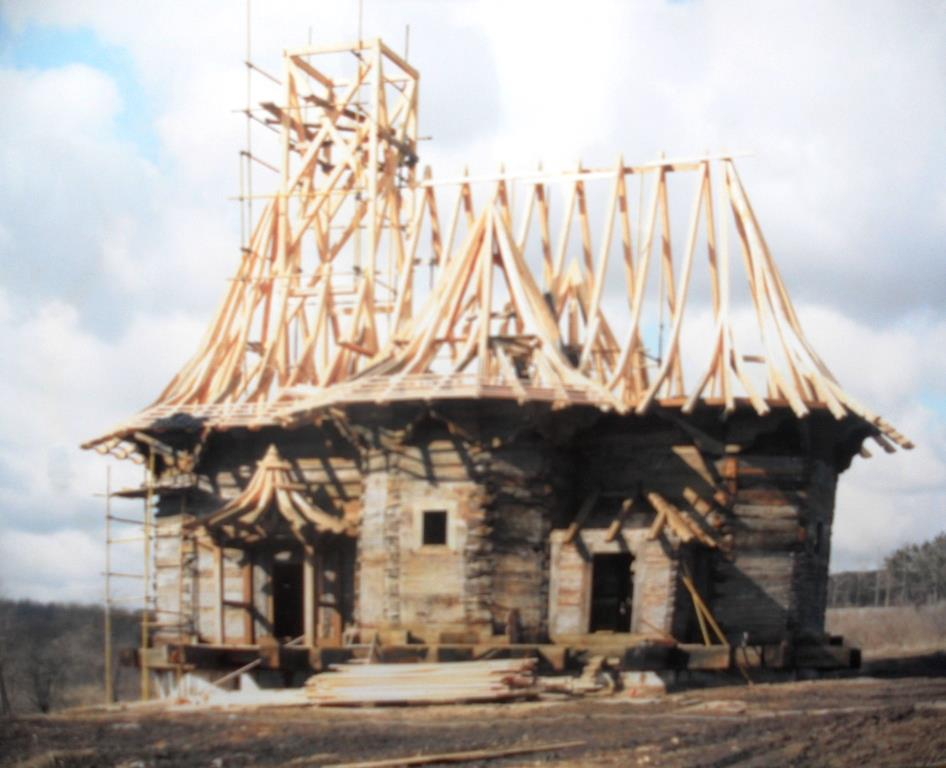

=== Inauguration ceremony ===
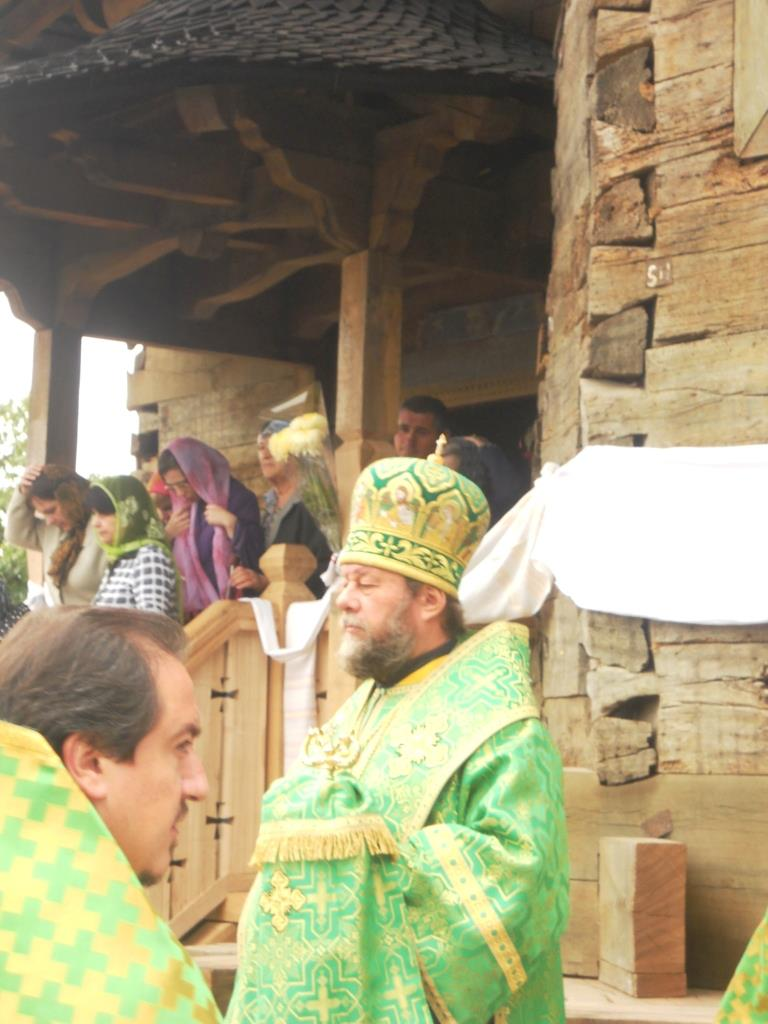

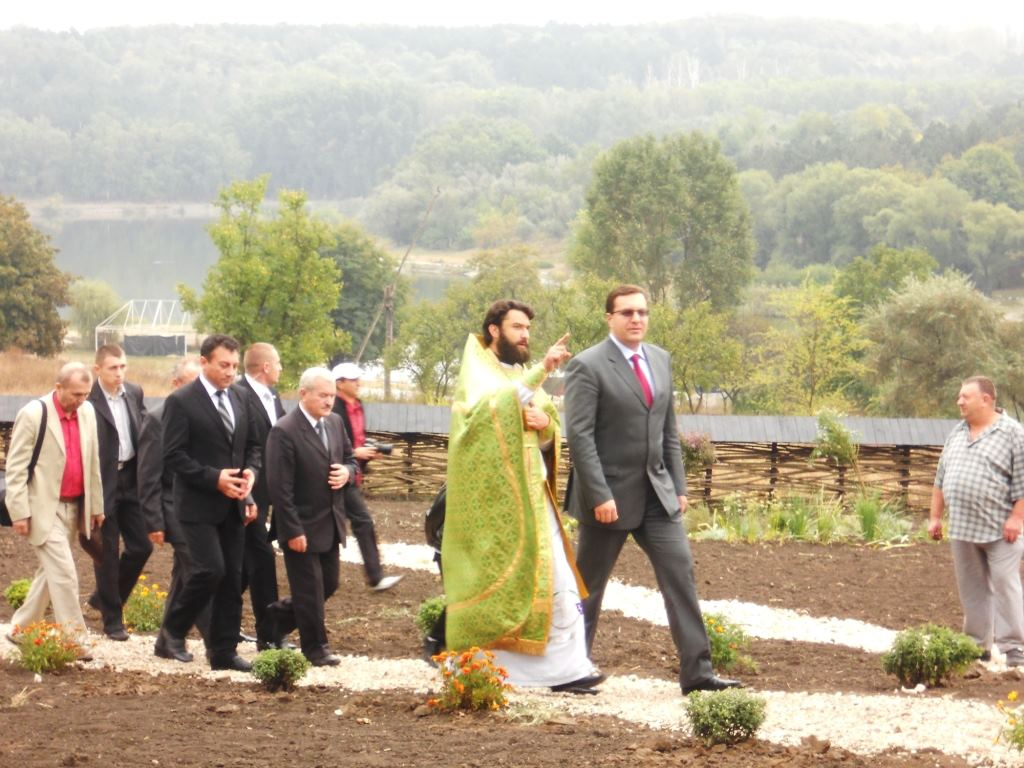

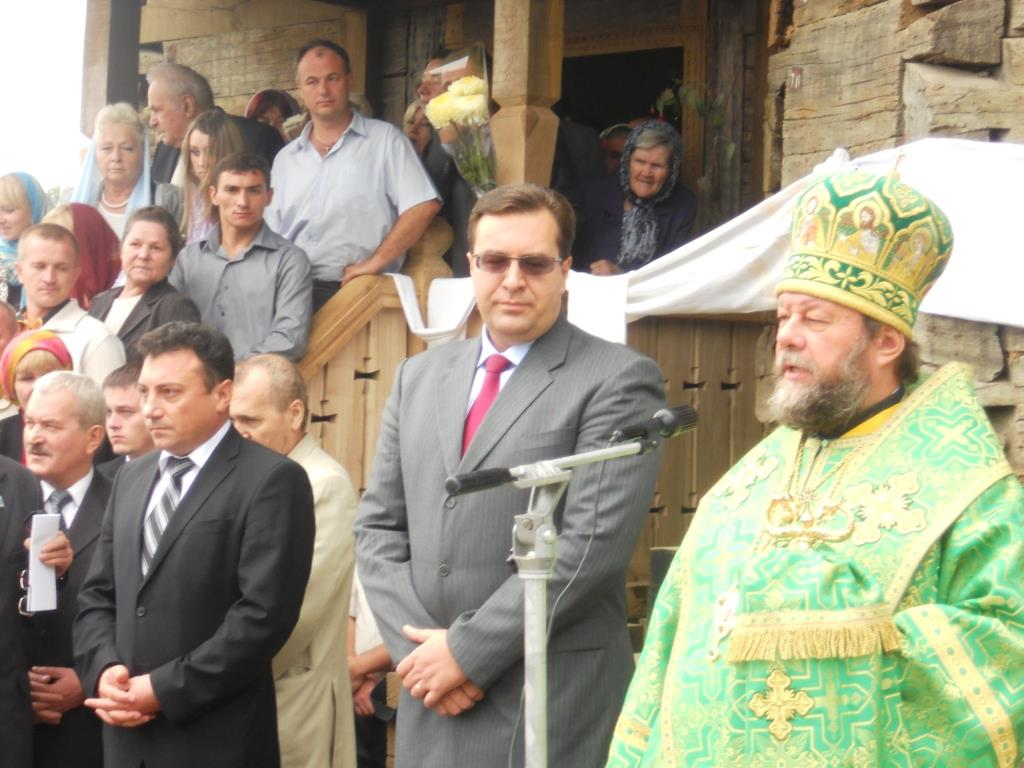

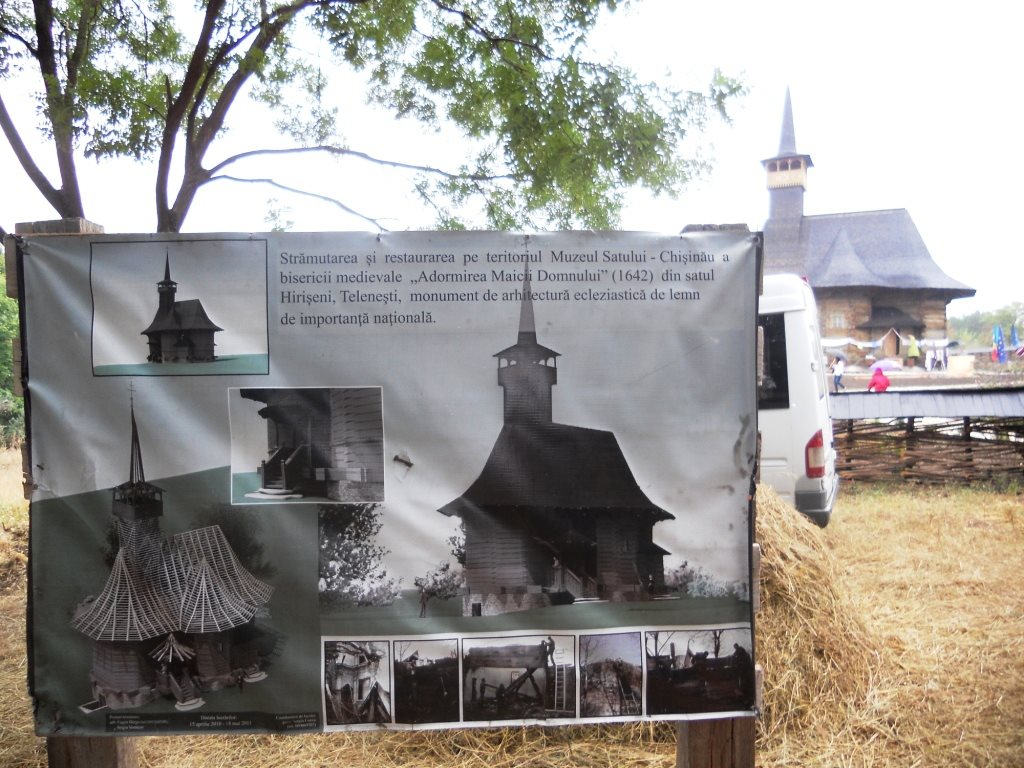

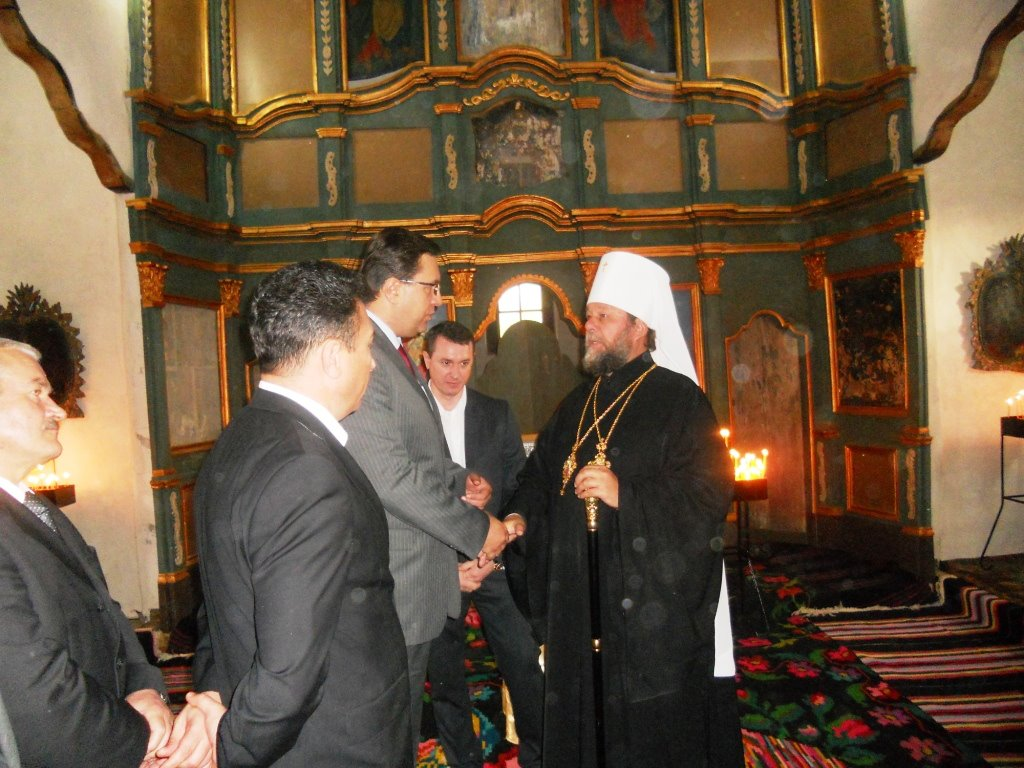

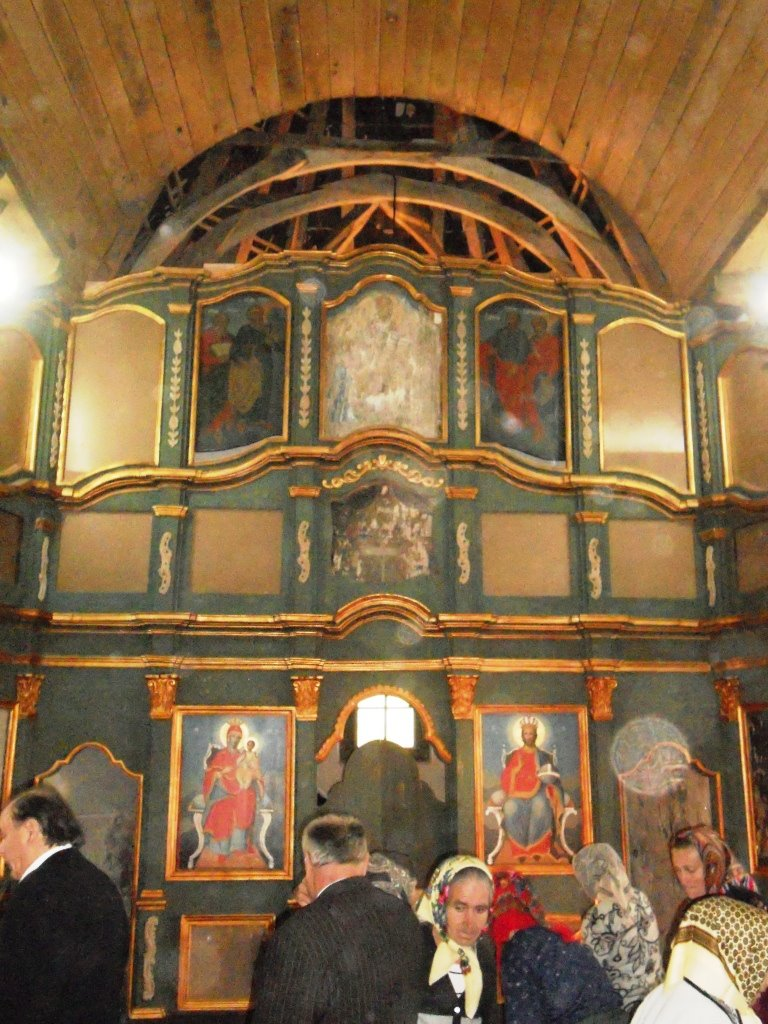

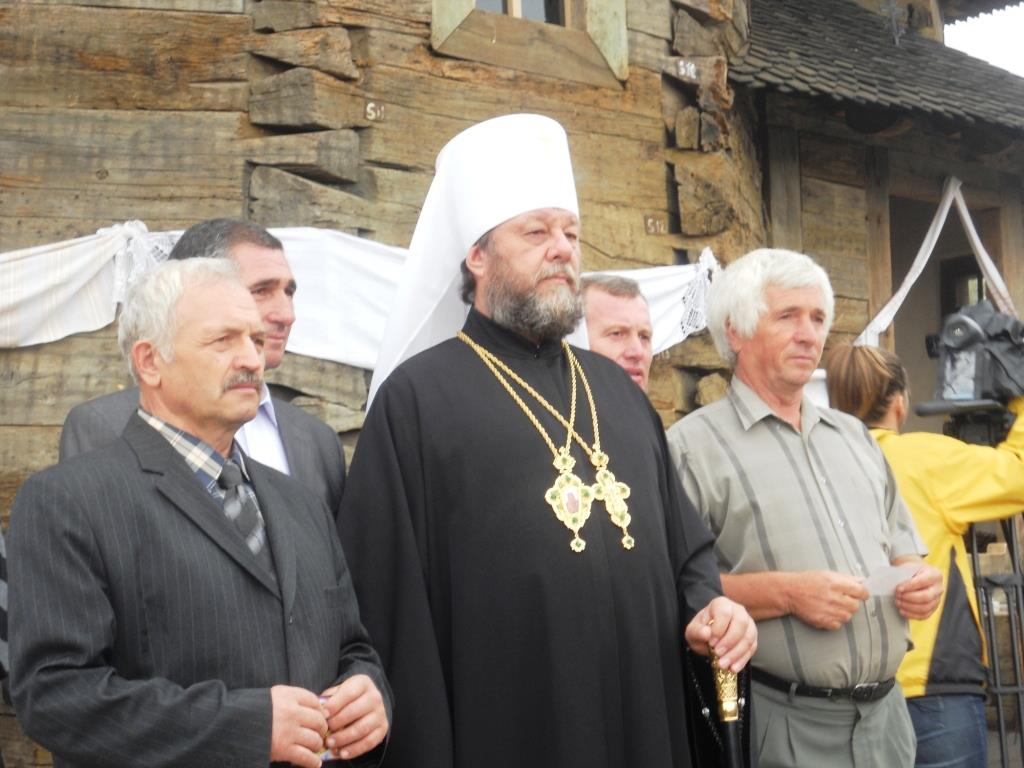

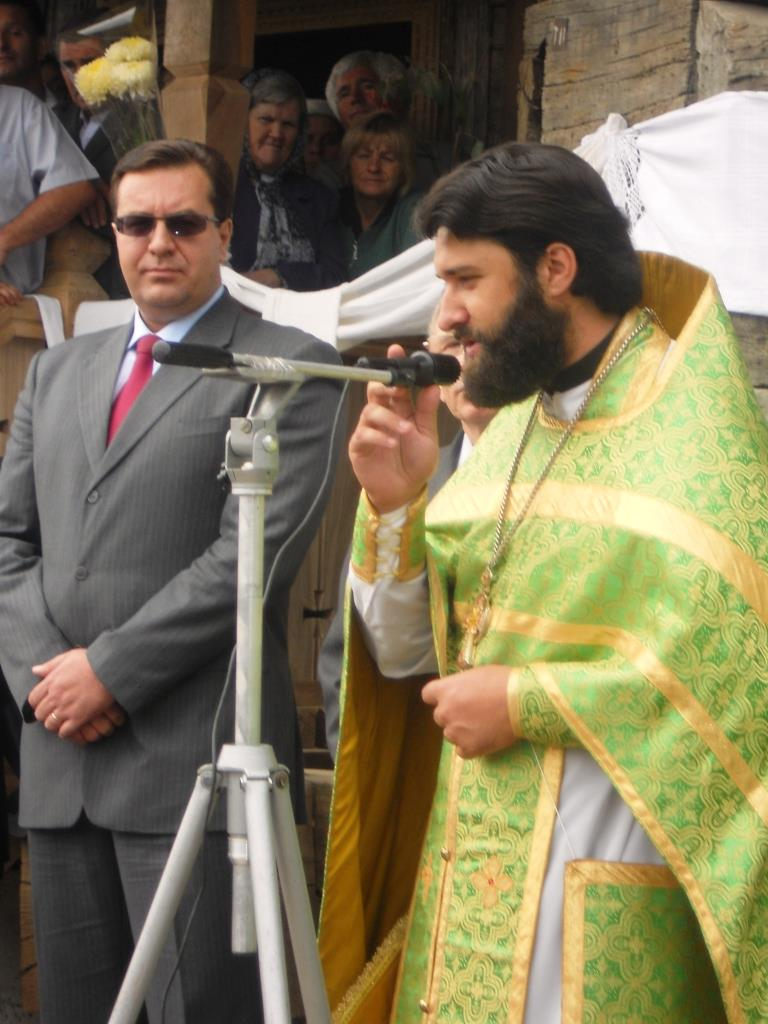

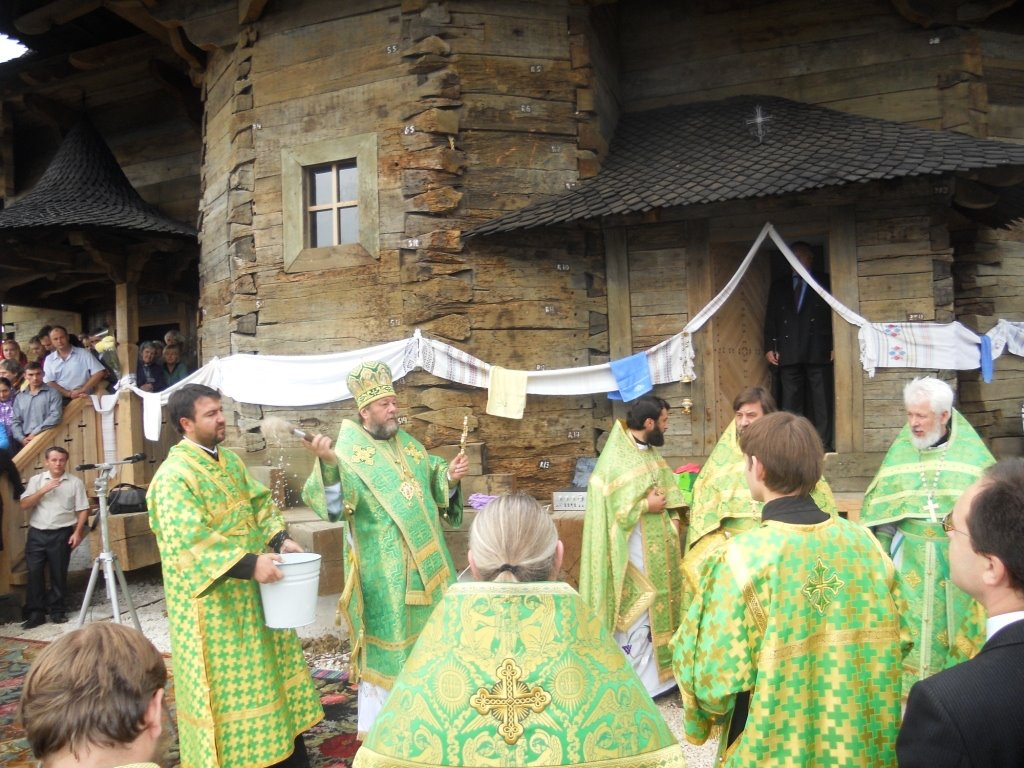

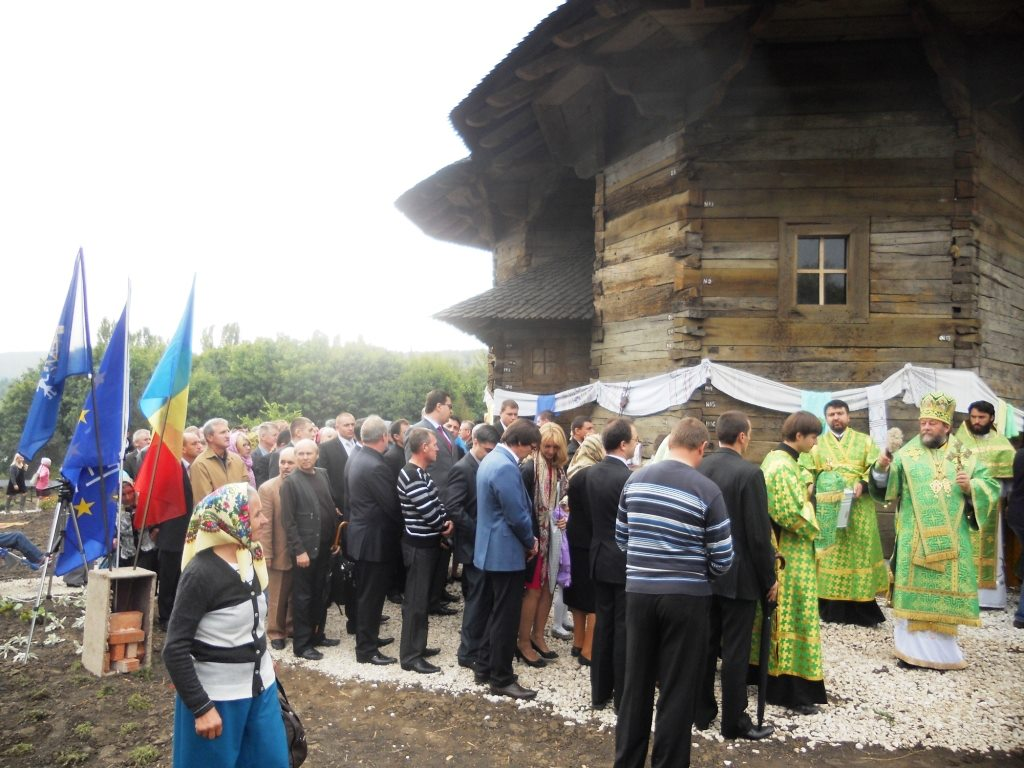

=== Church today ===
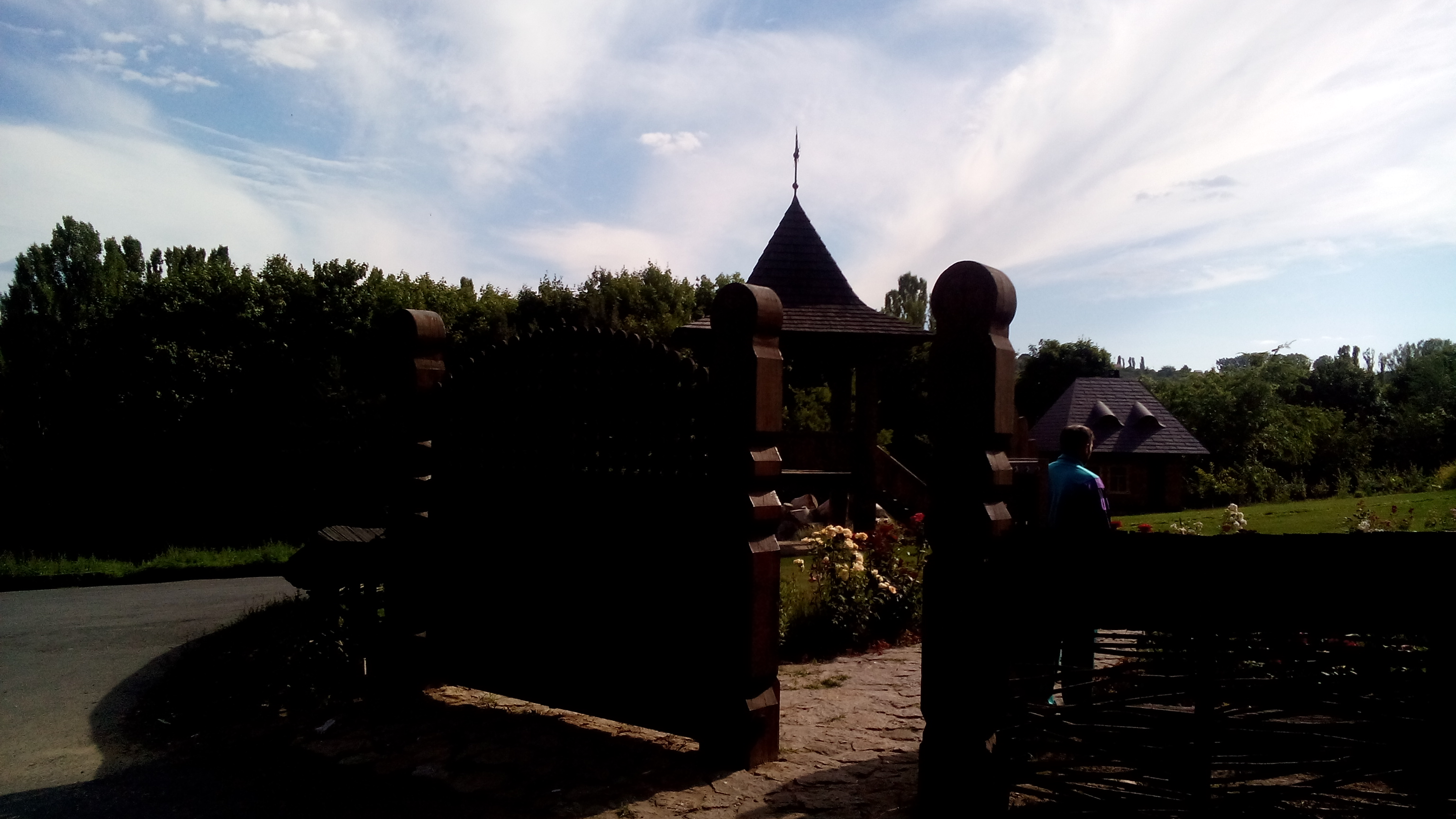

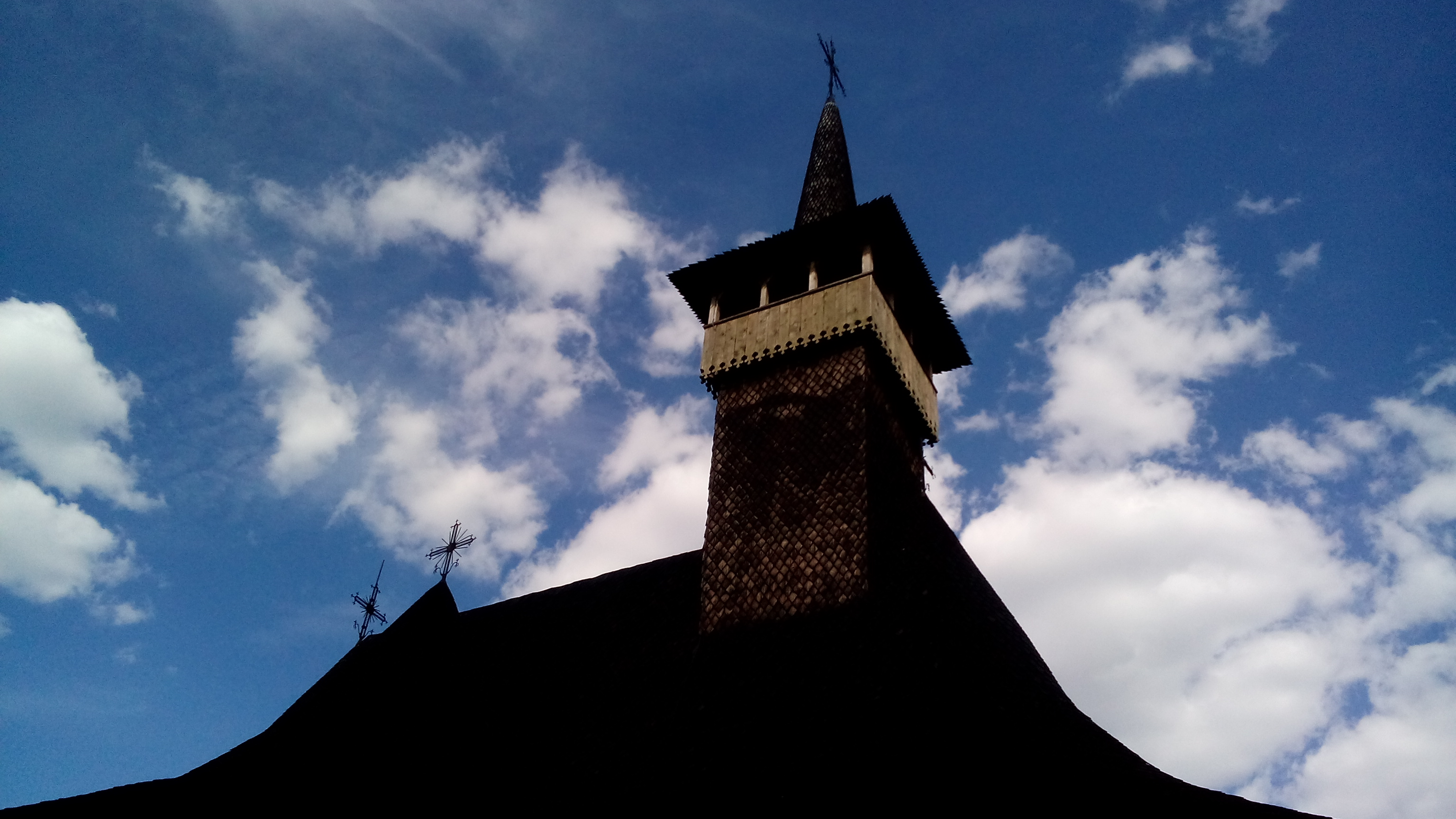

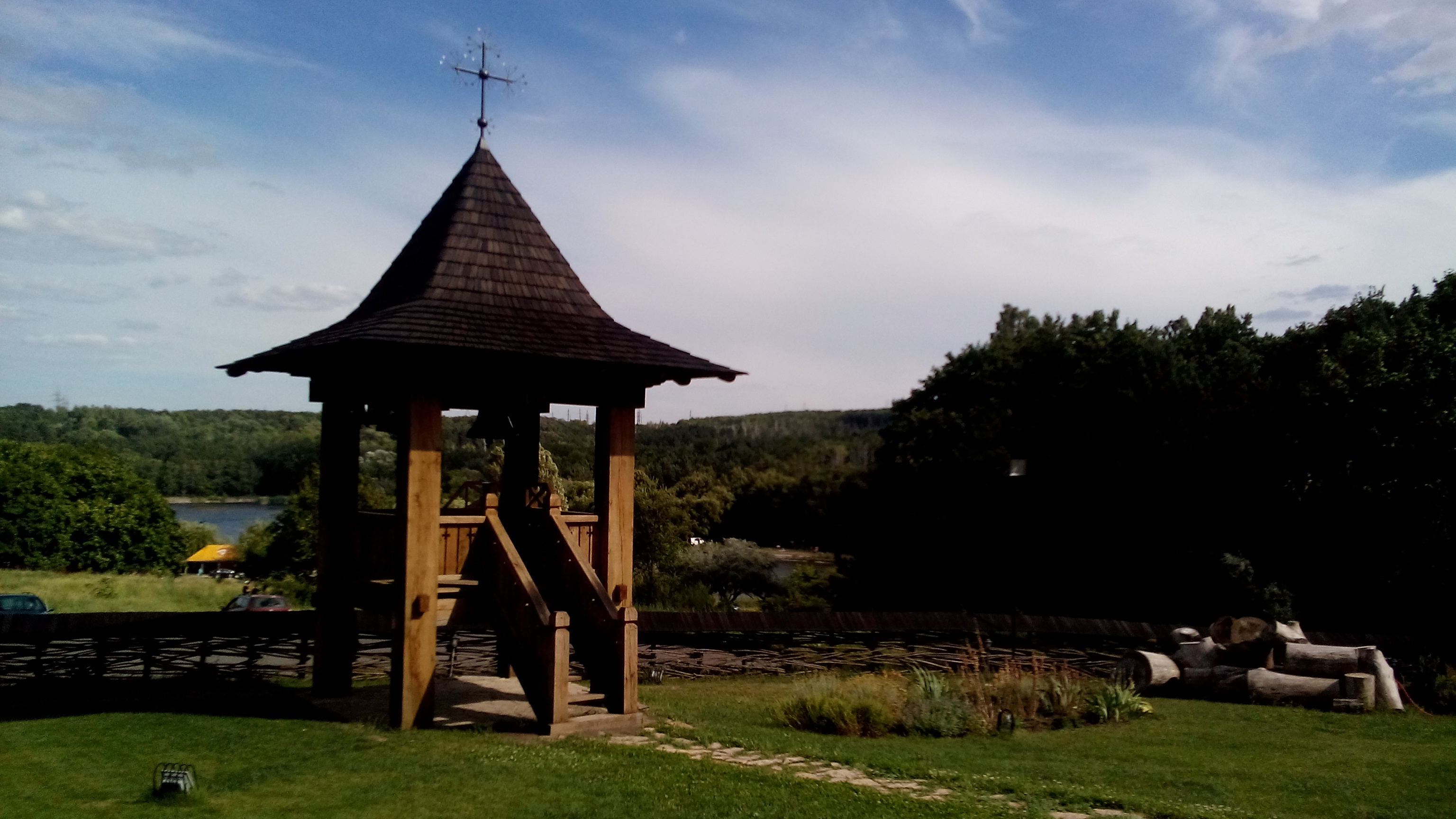

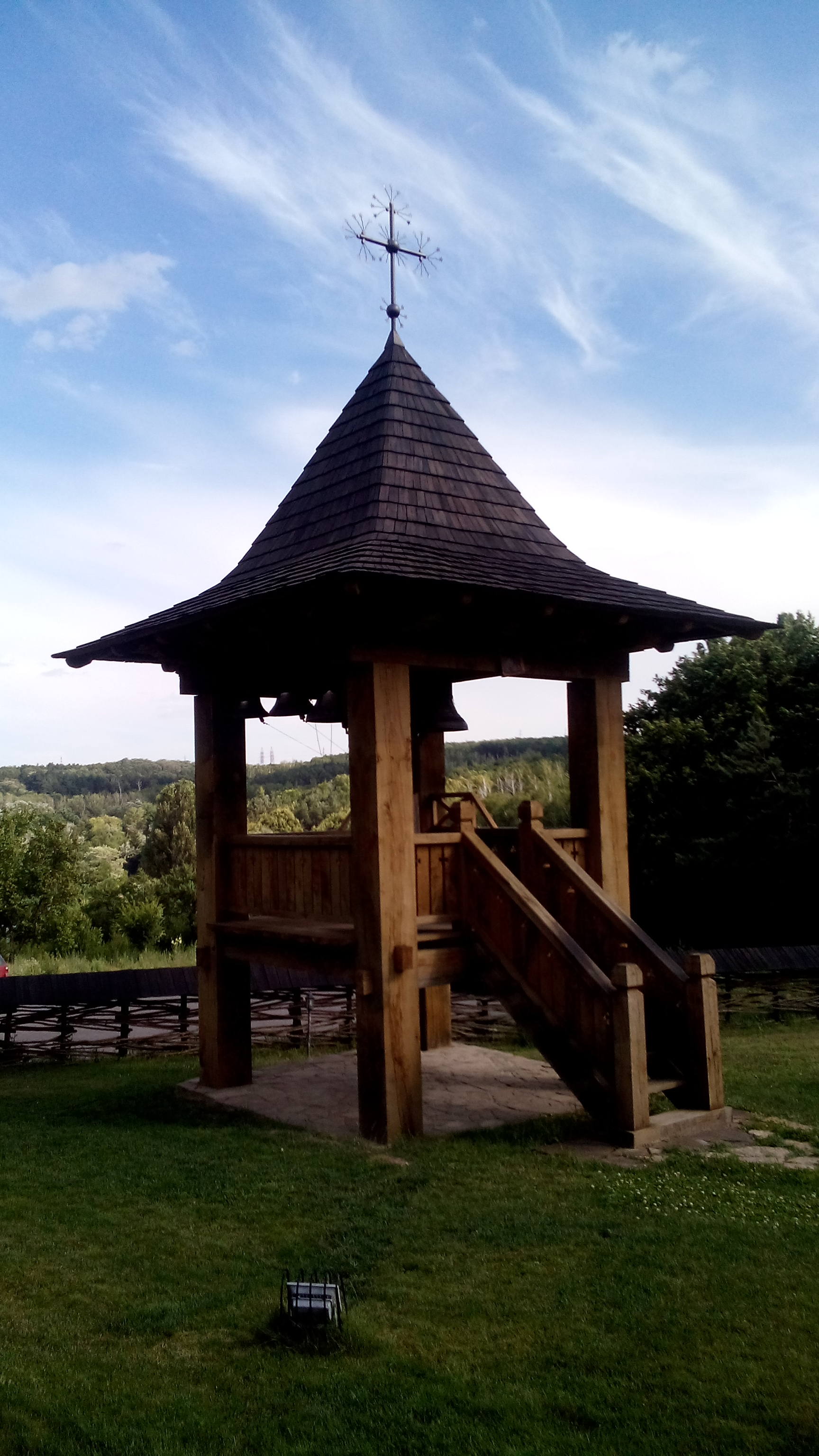

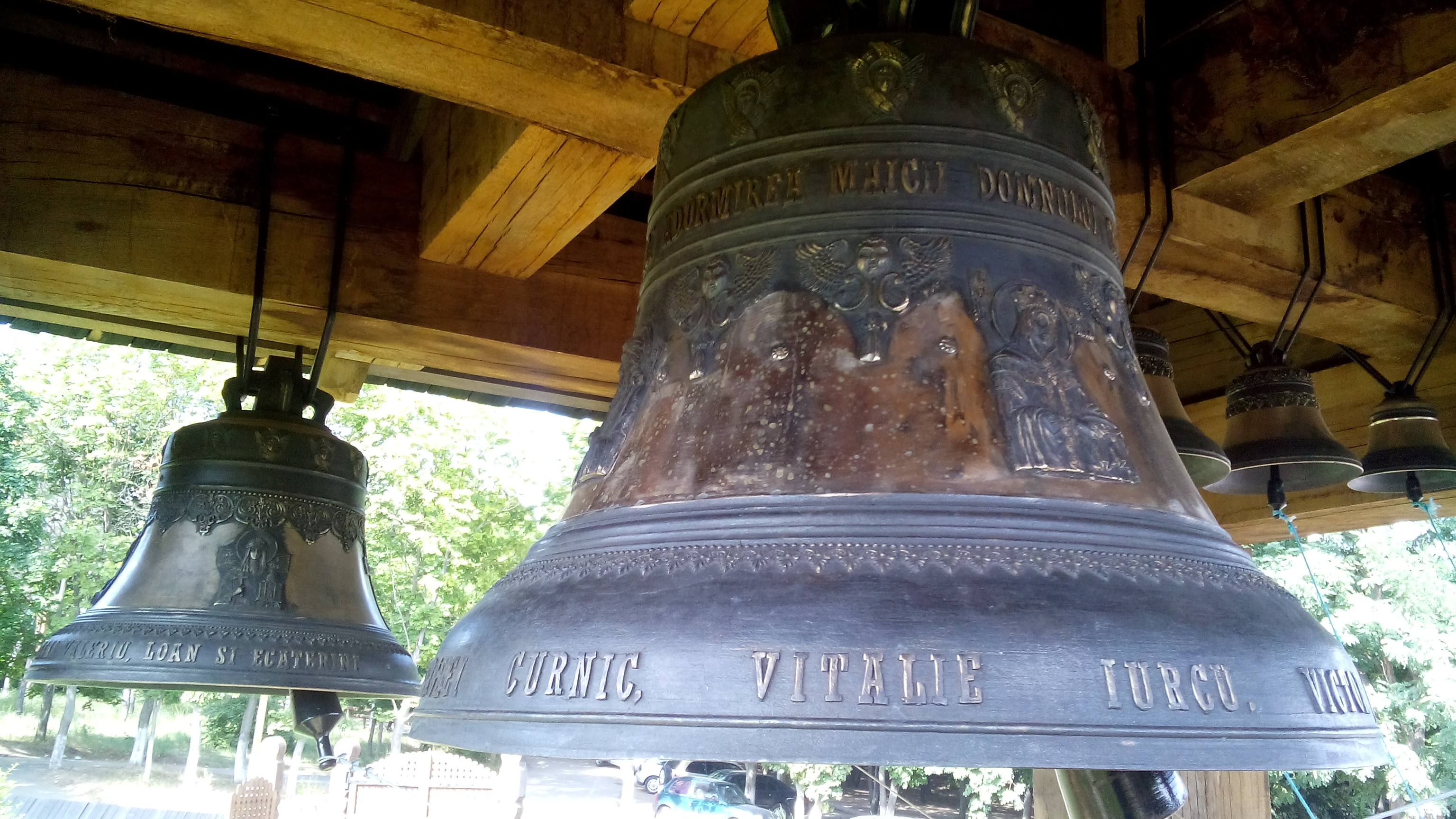

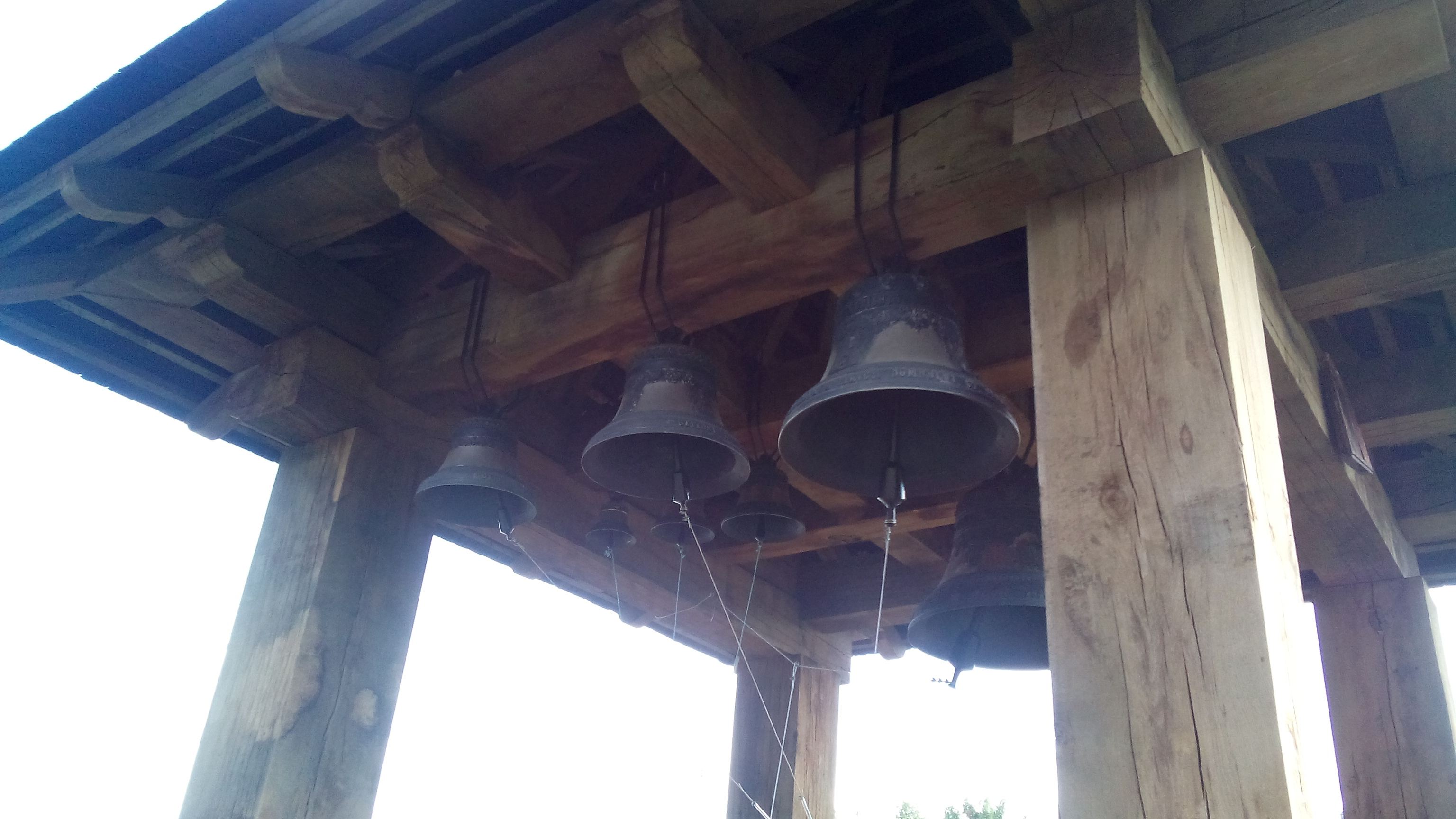

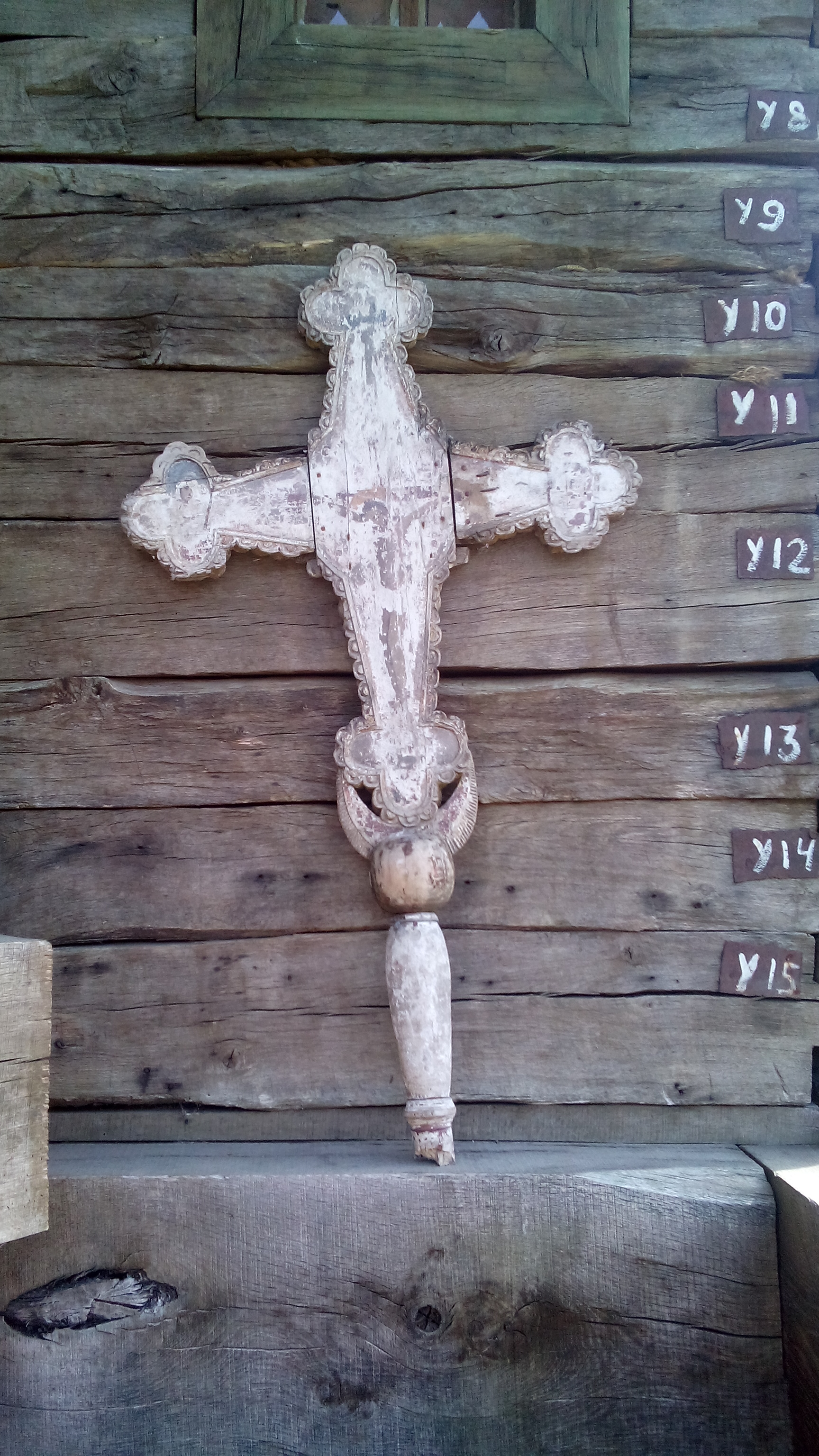

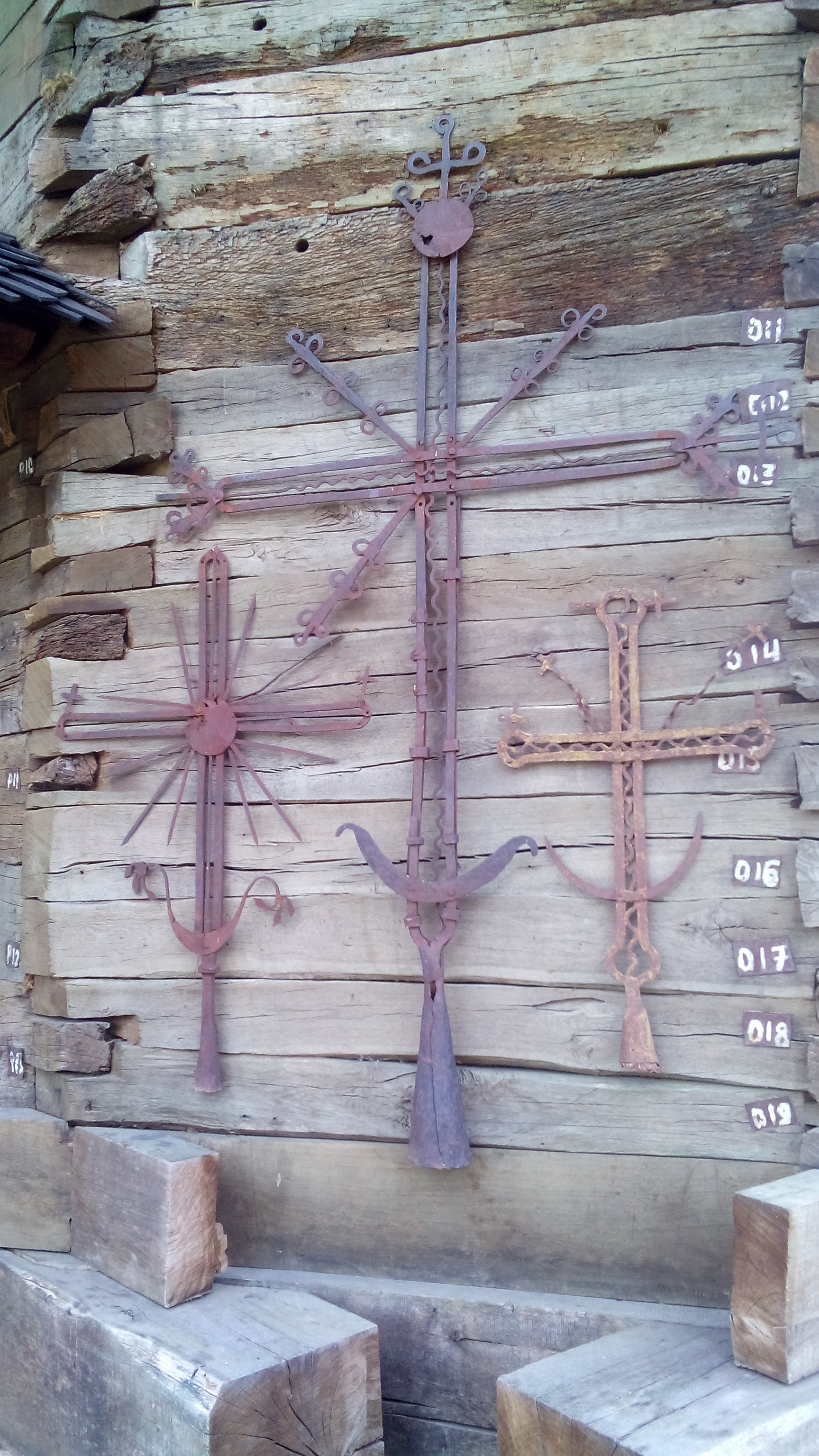

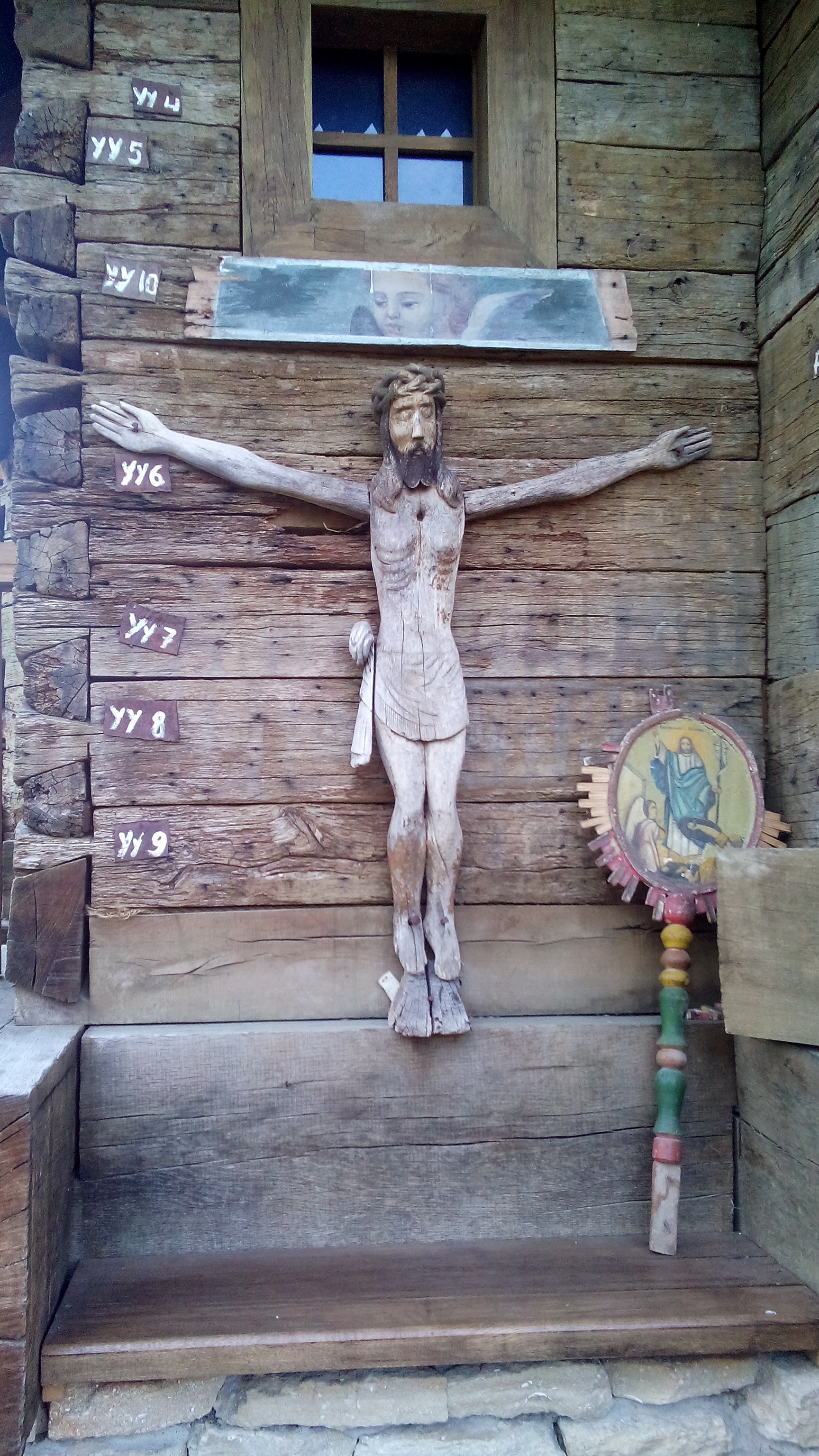

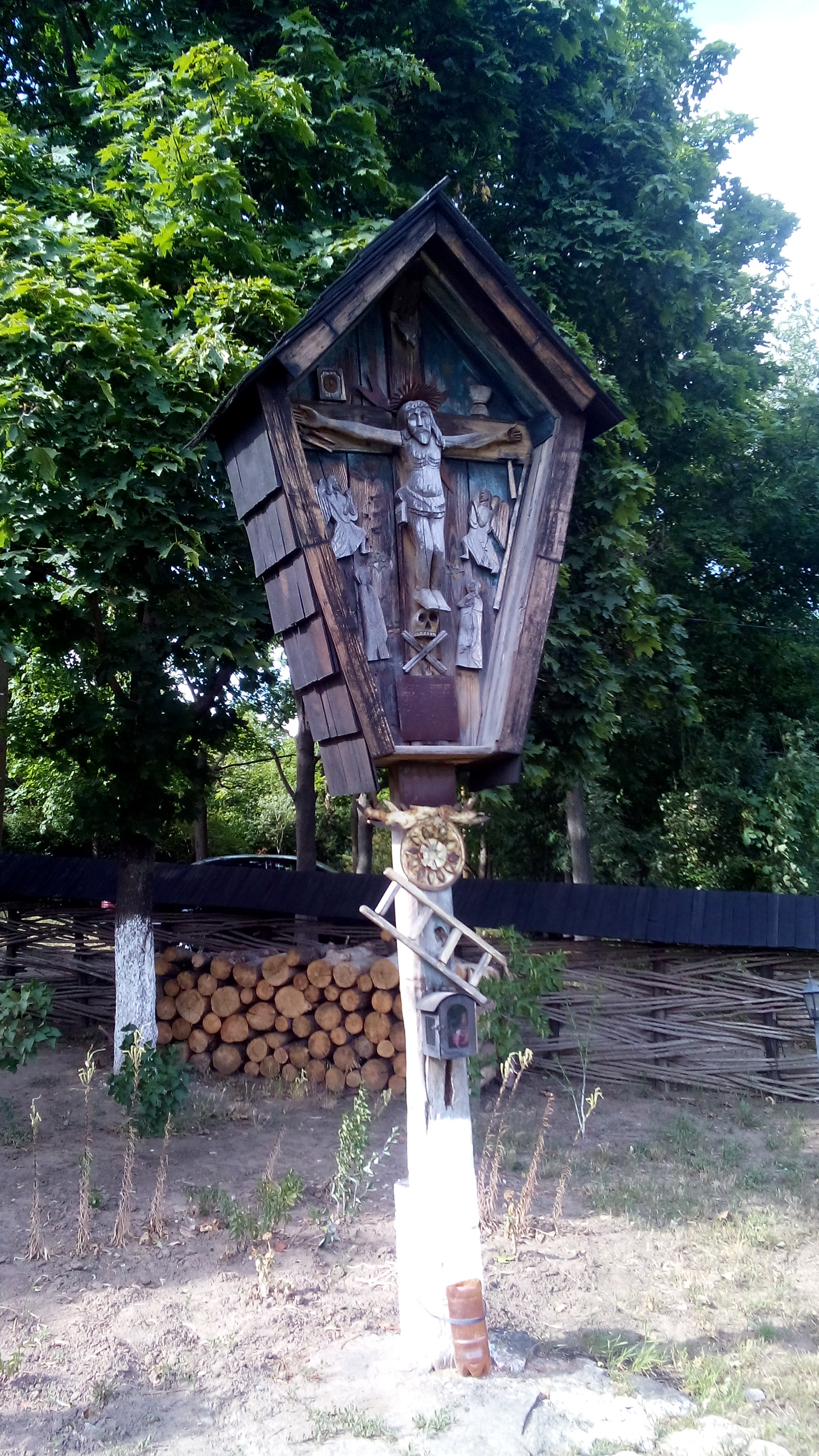

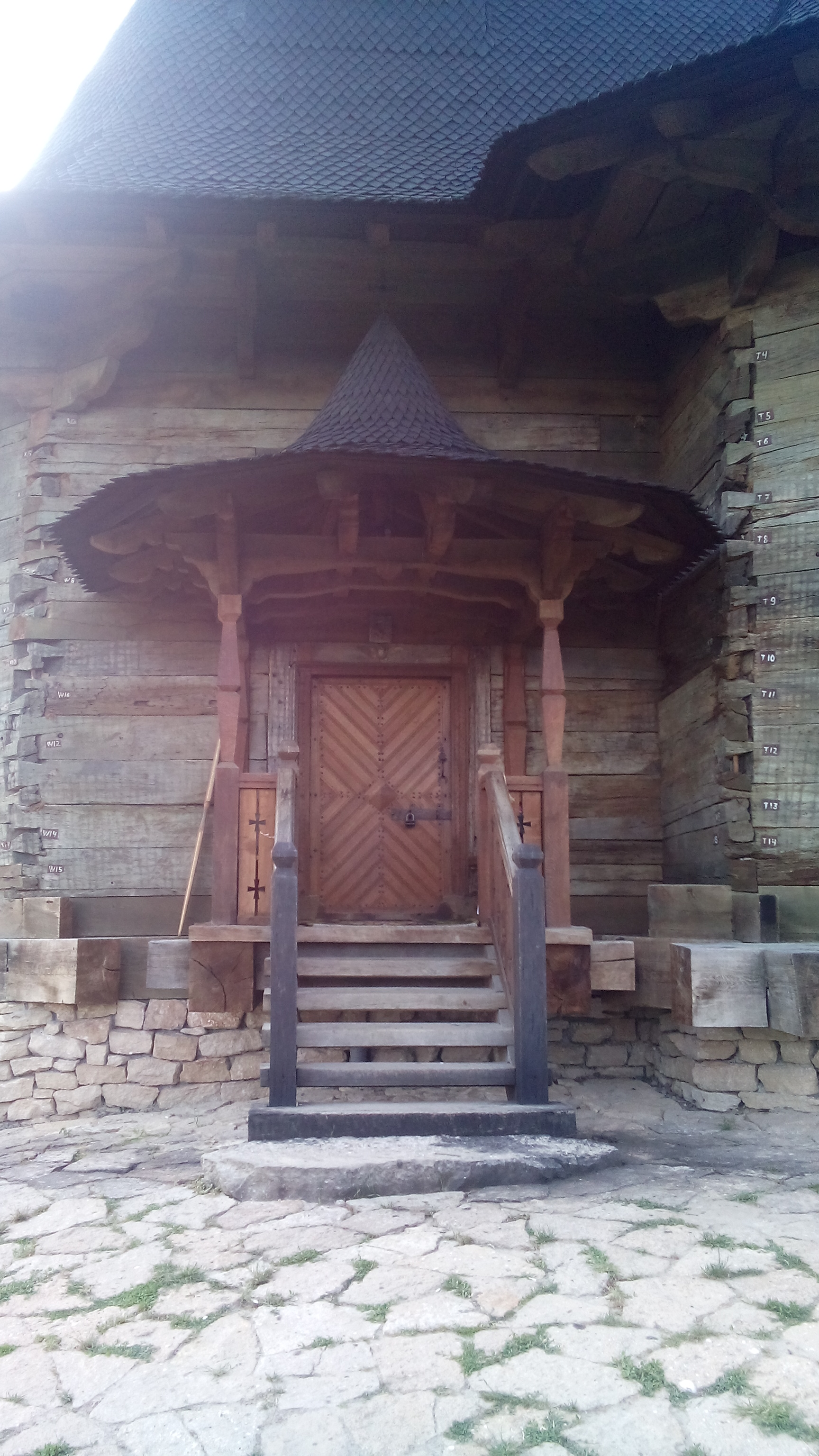

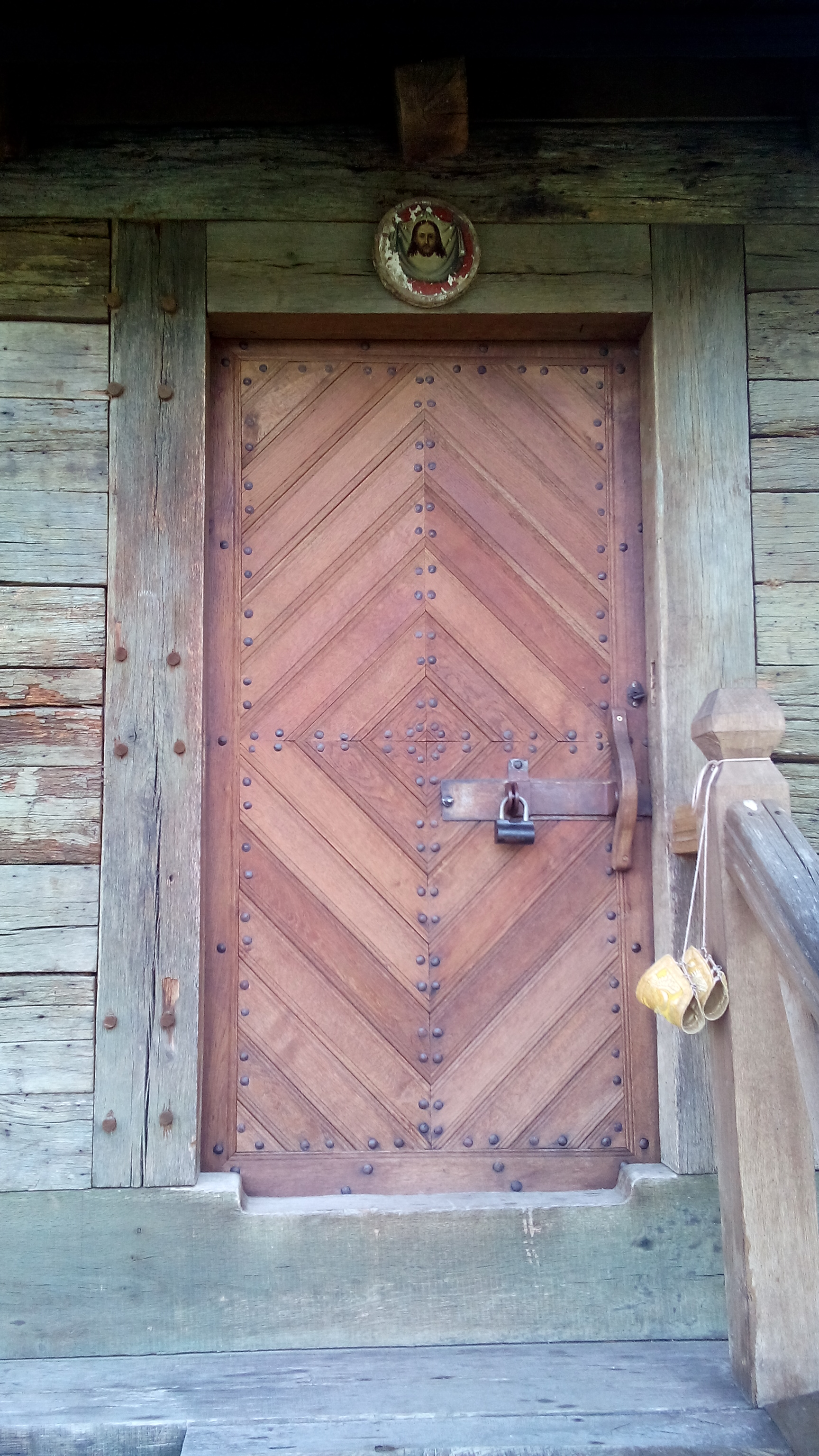

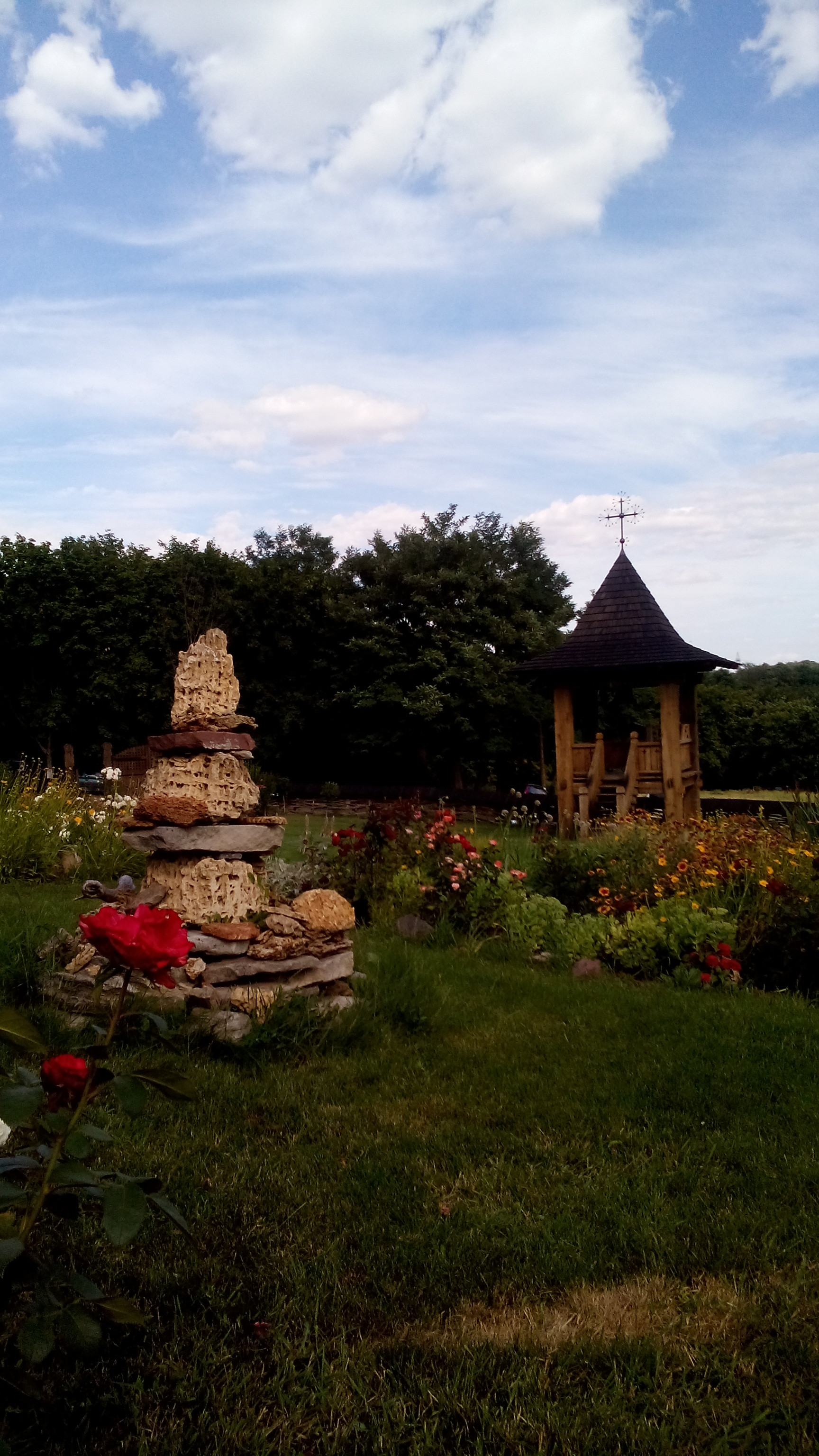

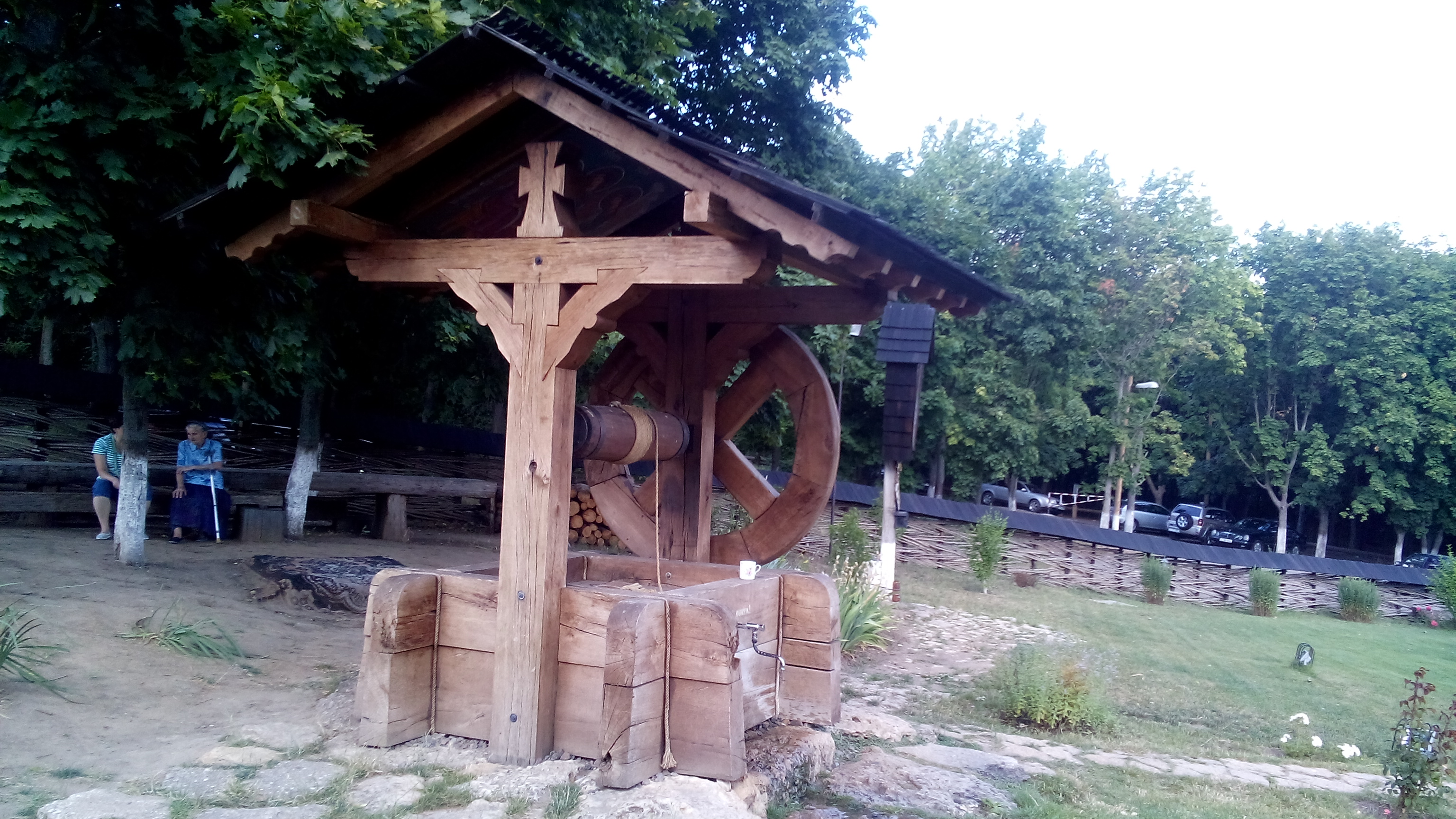

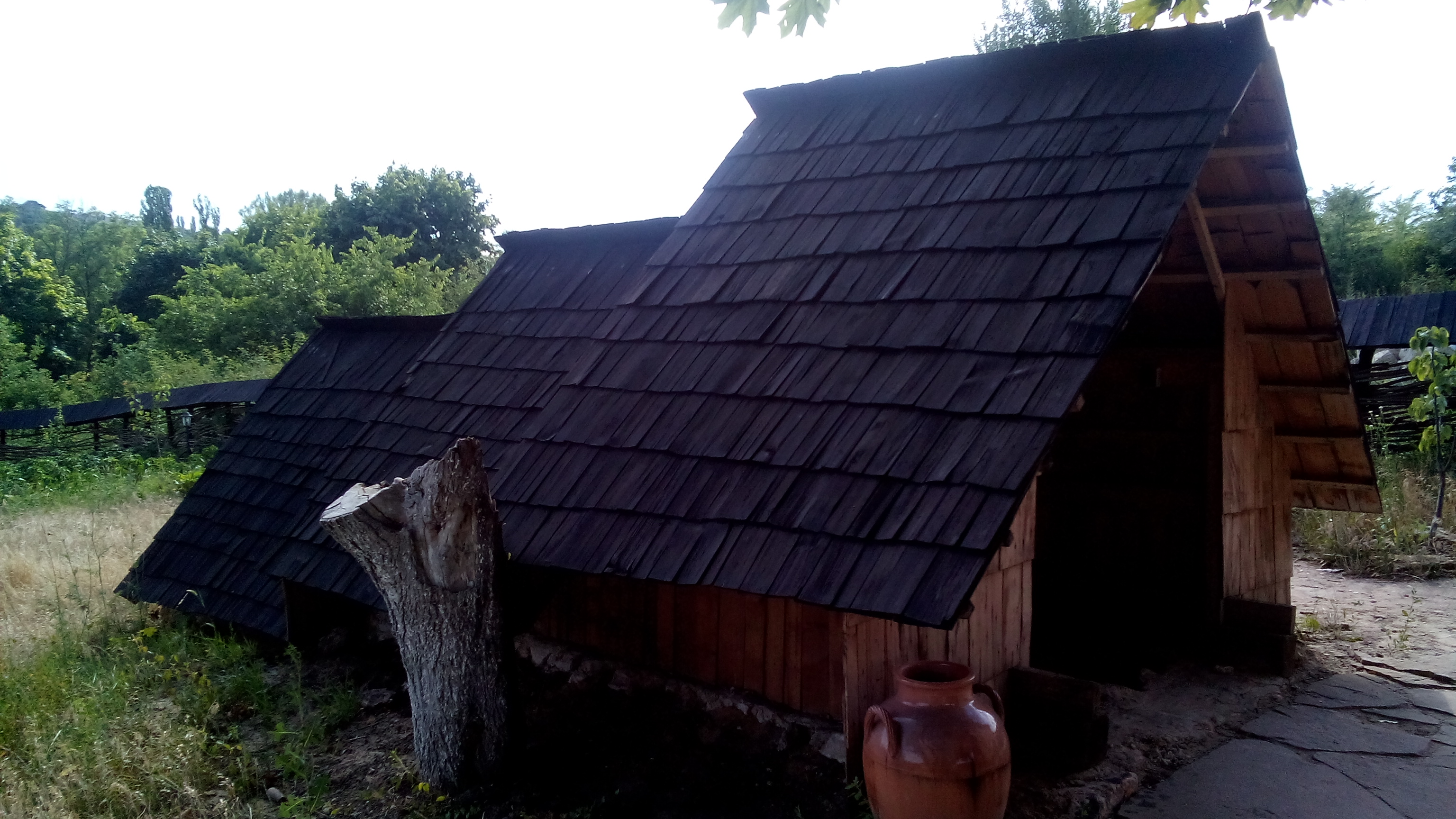

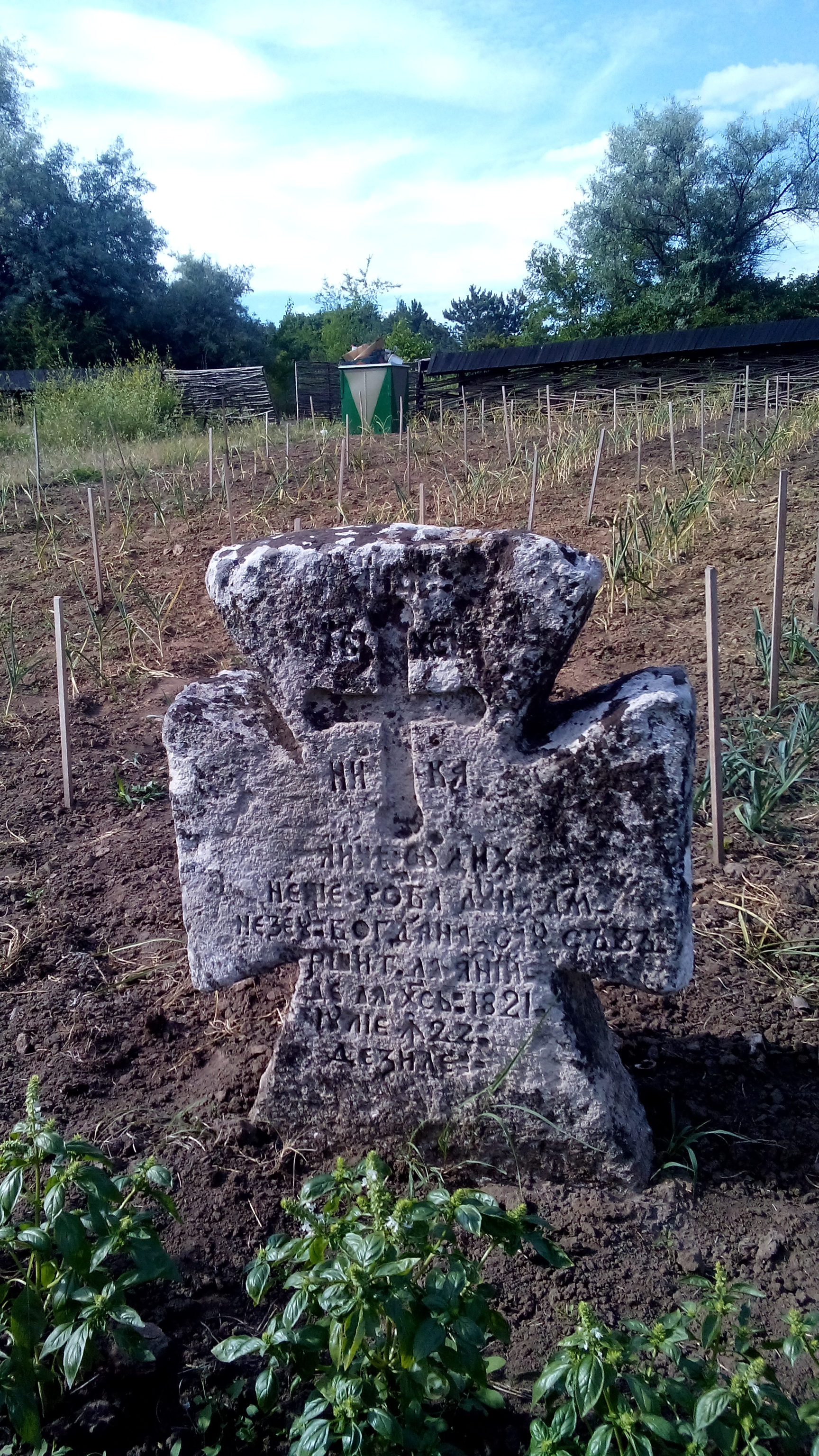
