= Hirișeni =

- Village
- Location within Moldova
- Country: Moldova
- District: Telenești District

Government
  - Mayor: Ion Petica (PLDM)

Population (2014 census)
  - Total: 1,366
- Time zone: UTC+2 (EET)
  - Summer (DST): UTC+3 (EEST)
- Postal code: MD-5821

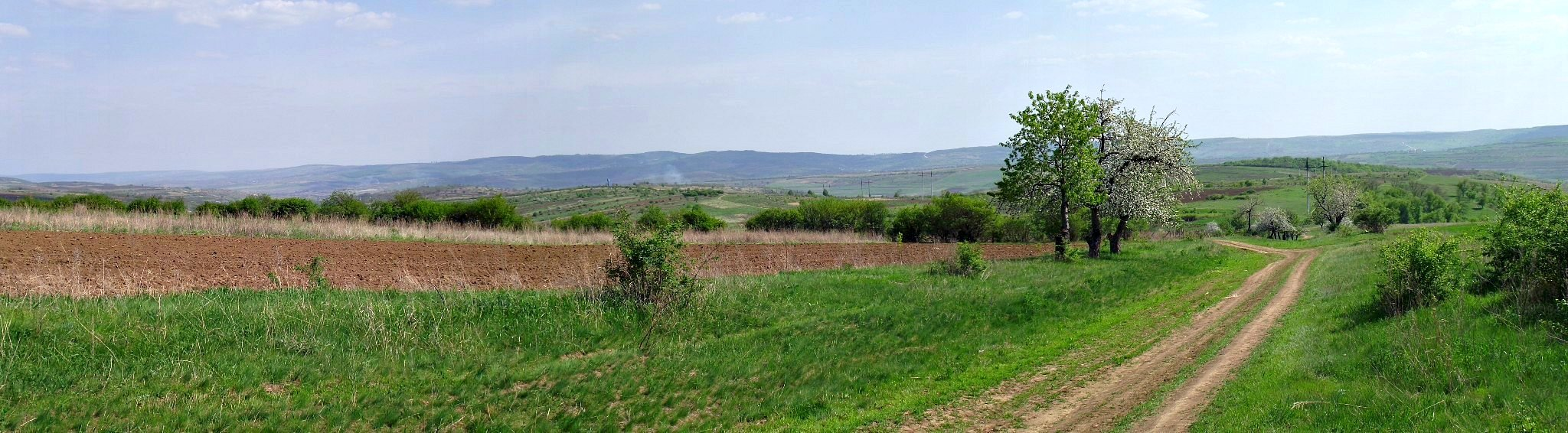
A road and field in Hirișeni

Hirișeni is a village in Telenești District, Moldova.

The wooden church of Hirișeni was originally located here.
