= 2025 Romanian presidential election =

- 4 May 2025 (first round); 18 May 2025 (second round)
- Turnout: 53.21% (first round) ▲2.03pp (Note: Turnout changes are against the 2019 election); 64.72% (second round) ▲9.86pp (Note: Turnout changes relative to the 2019 election)
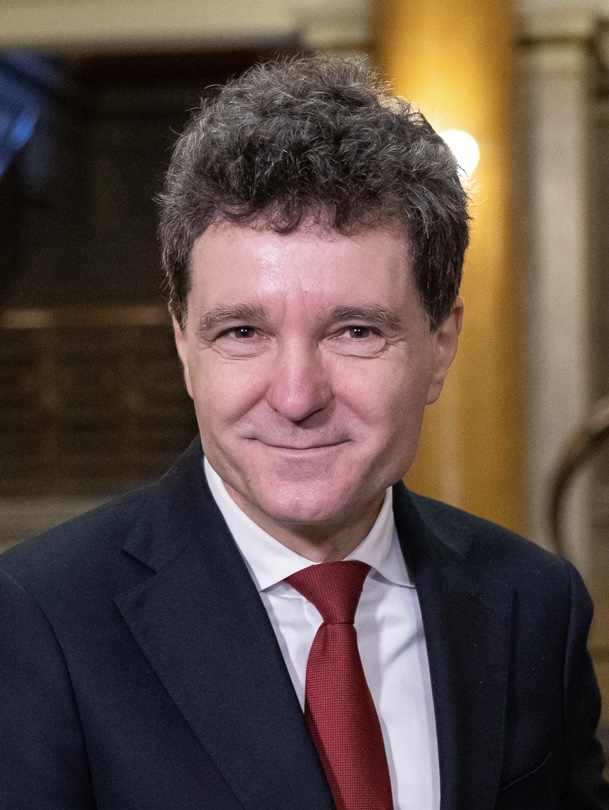

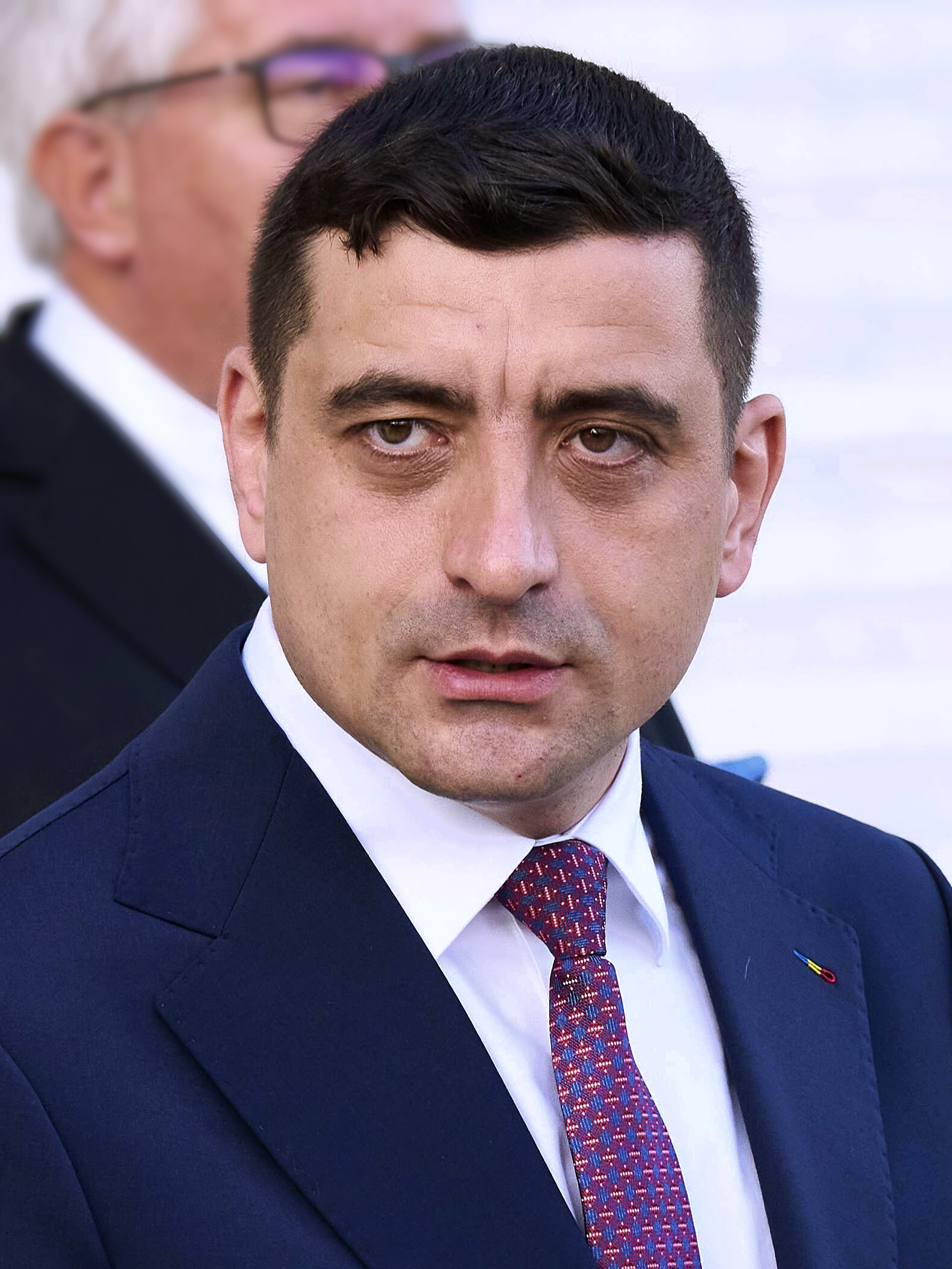
Nominee	Nicușor Dan	George Simion
Party	Independent (Note: Also endorsed by other Romanian parties and ethnic minority parties)	AUR (Note: Also endorsed by other Romanian parties)
Popular vote	6,168,642	5,339,053
Percentage	53.60%	46.40%
President before election
Ilie Bolojan (acting)
PNL
Elected President
Nicușor Dan
Independent

Presidential elections were held in Romania on 4 May 2025, with a second round on 18 May 2025. Nicușor Dan and George Simion were the two candidates who advanced to the second round, in which the former was victorious. Dan's term as the sixth president of Romania began on 26 May.

The election was scheduled in January 2025 following the annulment of the 2024 Romanian presidential election citing alleged Russian meddling in favour of first-round winner Călin Georgescu. The campaign was characterised by political instability and a series of protests against the annulment. On 7 March, Georgescu was barred from running, pending several criminal investigations, with the Alliance for the Union of Romanians (AUR) leader Simion announcing his candidacy in Georgescu's place.

Simion, who won 40.96% of the vote in the first round, faced Dan, who garnered 20.99% of the vote, in the second round that was held on 18 May 2025. Dan won with 53.6% against Simion's 46.4%. On 20 May, having previously conceded the election and congratulated Dan on his victory, Simion stated that he had formally filed a contest of the results with the Romanian Constitutional Court, alleging mass voter fraud. Simion's request for the annulment of the election was rejected by the Court two days later, and Dan's presidency began on 26 May.

== Background ==
=== Previous election annulled ===
On 6 December 2024, the 2024 Romanian presidential election, was annulled by the Constitutional Court of Romania, 48 hours before the second round was to be held, citing alleged Russian intervention on behalf of independent candidate, Călin Georgescu, who took a shock lead in the first round with 23%. CSAT said the campaign was "identical" to the online campaign launched by Russia before its invasion of Ukraine. On 20 December, an investigation was published showing that PNL had seemingly paid for one of the TikTok campaigns. PNL interim president Ilie Bolojan had stated that the campaign was altered illegally to favour Georgescu but did not blame the company they worked with for the alteration.

=== Second Ciolacu cabinet ===
After the 2024 Romanian parliamentary election, the second Ciolacu cabinet was formed as a minority coalition between PSD, PNL, and UDMR, with confidence and supply from minority parties, on 23 December 2024. Furthermore, Ilie Bolojan became President of the Senate of Romania and Ciprian-Constantin Șerban became the President of the Chamber of Deputies of Romania. The cabinet passed with a seven-vote majority and became official. Opposition leaders (most prominently George Simion and POT Leader Anamaria Gavrilă) called the cabinet illegitimate and for the resignation of incumbent president Klaus Iohannis.

=== President Iohannis' resignation and political crisis ===
Following the annulment of the 2024 presidential election in December, Iohannis was allowed to stay on as president by the Constitutional Court until his successor could be sworn in. On 10 February, following an attempt by members of parliament to impeach him, Iohannis announced that he would resign on 12 February. Senate president Ilie Bolojan assumed the role of acting president until the elections.

=== Georgescu barring and Simion candidacy ===
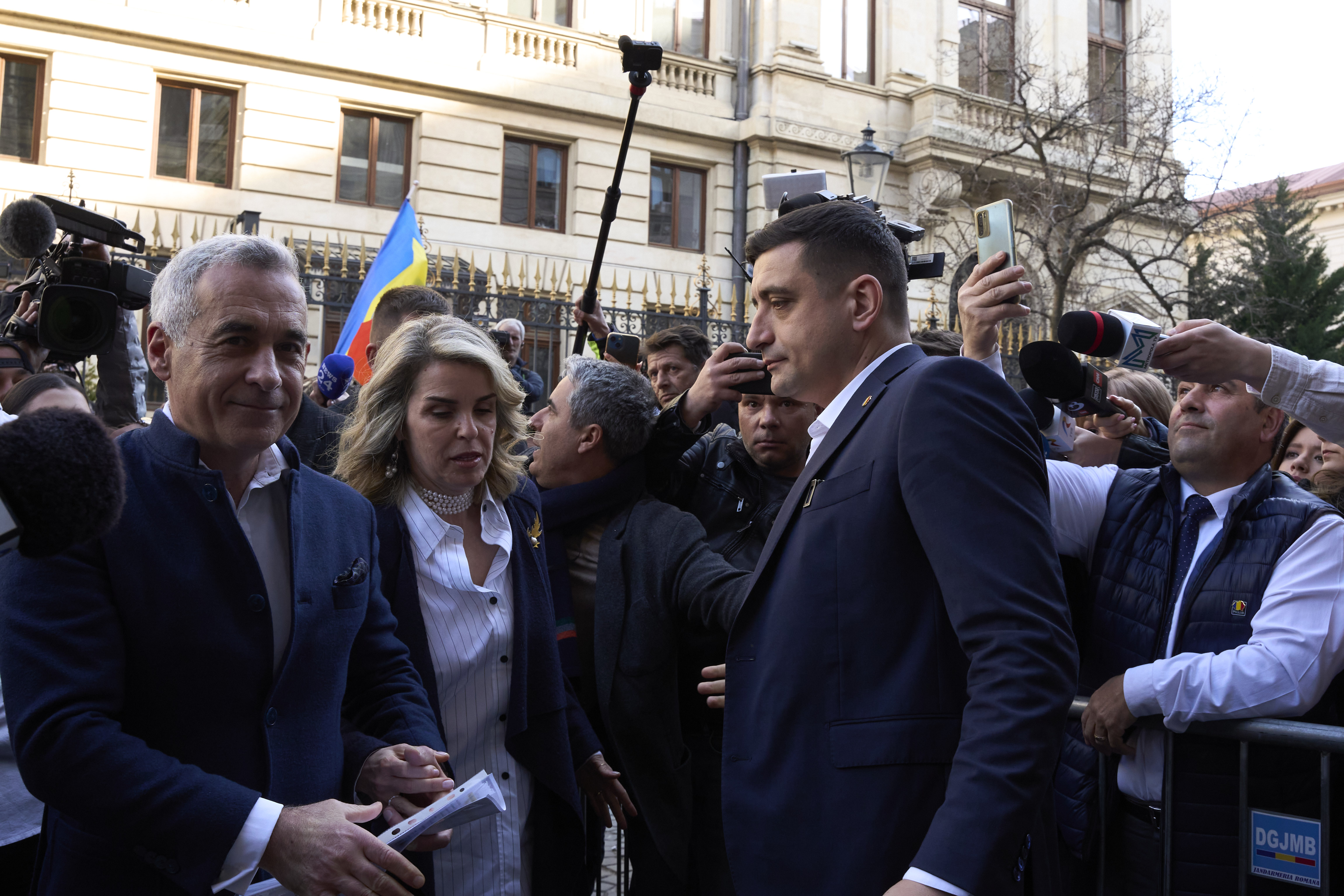
Călin Georgescu (left) arriving to the Central Electoral Bureau to file his candidacy accompanied by his wife Cristela (centre-left) and George Simion (centre-right). His candidacy was rejected two days later, on March 9, due to legal and procedural issues linked to the former presidential elections and alleged Russian intervention in his favour.

On 26 February 2025, Georgescu was stopped by police in traffic, while allegedly on his way to register for the election. He was charged with six offenses, including incitement to actions against the constitutional order, and support of fascist groups. Preemptive measures have been imposed, including judiciary control, and a 60-day ban on posting xenophobic and antisemitic materials to social networks (although such actions are already illegal in Romania). The police claimed to have found ten million U.S. dollars buried inside his bodyguard's house along with plane tickets to Moscow.

On 7 March, Georgescu filed his candidacy to the Central Electoral Bureau, being rejected two days later which led to new protests. Consequently, George Simion arrived to the Central Electoral Bureau on 14 March accompanied by former Polish prime minister Mateusz Morawiecki to file his candidacy after collecting 604,000 signatures, above the minimum requirement of 200,000. The CEB approved his candidacy on the following day, which was also the deadline for candidates to register, with Simion stating "We passed the BEC, now let's see if we pass the CCR and return to democracy". The CCR validated his candidacy one day later as well as the ones of Nicușor Dan and Victor Ponta.

== Election date ==
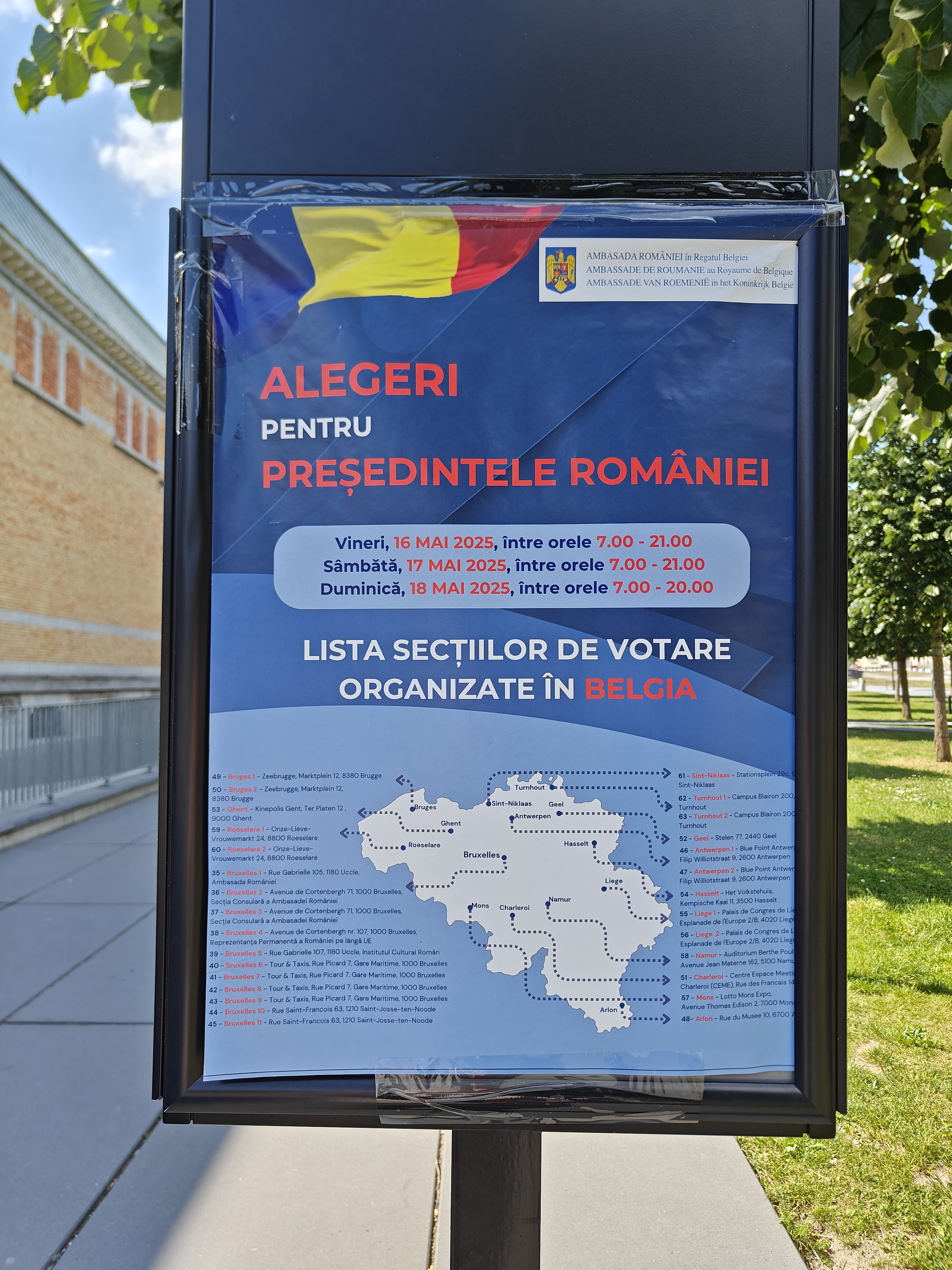
Voting locations in Belgium, announcement on Tour & Taxis

The date of the first round had initially been publicly speculated by news media as 23 March 2025, with the runoff two weeks later (6 April 2025). In early January, these dates became obsolete, as the law for electing the president of Romania requires a minimum of 75 days between the election day and the day the election is called. On 8 January, the coalition fixed the dates of the election. The first round was scheduled to be held on 4 May 2025 with the second round two weeks later (18 May 2025).

Date	Event
8 January	The government fixed the date for the election (first round on 4 May 2025)
20 February	The Central Electoral Bureau (BEC) is constituted (judges from the High Court of Cassation and Justice drawn, and representatives of the Permanent Electoral Authority)
21 February	The BEC is finalised (representatives form the parliamentary parties)
23 February	Deadline for registration of electoral alliances at BEC
15 March	Deadline for candidates to register, 23:59:59 (at BEC)
17 March	Deadline for BEC to validate or reject candidates registered on 15 March (48 hours after registering)
19 March	Deadline to file complaints at CCR against BEC decision (of validation or rejection of a candidacy) (24 hours after BEC ruling)
20 March	Definitive candidacies announced
22 March	BEC determines the order of the candidates on the ballot paper (lottery)
4 April	The start of the electoral campaign (at 7:00)
2 May	The end of the electoral campaign (at 22:00); Voting at polling stations abroad begins at 7:00 a.m. local time
4 May	Voting in Romania begins at 7:00 a.m.

== Candidates ==
The Central Electoral Bureau (BEC) was constituted on 21 February 2025. The deadline for registering electoral alliances at the BEC was on 23 February 2025. By that deadline, only one electoral alliance was registered, between the governing PSD, PNL, and UDMR, called the Romania Forward Electoral Alliance (Alianța Electorală România Înainte; A.Ro for short).

Persons who wished to run for the office could begin gathering the support signatures (a minimum of 200,000) after 23 February. The deadline for registering the candidacy at the BEC was 15 March 2025, at 23:59:59. All candidatures validated by the BEC had to pass the scrutiny of the Constitutional Court of Romania. On 19 March, Gavrilă withdrew her candidacy for president, endorsing Simion. A final list of all 11 candidates was released on the following day. On 22 March, a random draw took place, placing Simion on the first position on the ballot and Nicușor Dan on the last.

=== Advanced to runoff ===
Name	Campaign and affiliation	Public office experience	Party and endorsements	Candidacy related dates
George Simion Electoral symbol:	Democrație (lit. 'Democracy') (Website)	Deputy for Bucharest (2020–*)	Ballot affiliation: ●Alliance for the Union of Romanians (AUR) Endorsed by: ●POT, ●PNȚCD, ●PSR, ●PPR	BEC registration: 14 March 2025; BEC validation: 15 March 2025
Nicușor Dan Electoral symbol:	România Onestă (lit. 'Honest Romania') (Website)	General Mayor of Bucharest (2020–*) Deputy for Bucharest (2016–2020) Bucharest General Councilor (2016)	Ballot affiliation: Independent Endorsed by: ●DREPT, ●PMP, ●FD, ●REPER, ●RîA, ●PV, ●SENS, ●EMSZ, ●USR*	Announced intention to run: 16 December 2024; DREPT announces support: 18 December 2024; PMP, and FD announce support: 2 February 2025; REPER announces support: 1 March 2025; USR announces support: 9 April 2025; BEC registration: 7 March 2025; BEC validation: 9 March 2025; BEC validation upheld by Constitutional Court: 11 March 2025

=== Other registered candidates in ballot order ===
Name	Campaign and affiliation	Public office experience	Party and endorsements	Candidacy related dates
Crin Antonescu	România, înainte! (lit. 'Romania, Forward!') (website)	Acting president of Romania (2012); President of the Senate (2012–2014); Minister of Youth and Sport (1997–2000); Senator (2008–2016); Deputy (1992–2008)	Affiliation: A.Ro; Endorsed by: Ethnic minority parties	Announced as common PSD, PNL, and UDMR candidate: 24 December 2024; Announced self-suspension of campaign: 4 January 2025; Validated as PNL candidate: 26 January 2025; Validated as UDMR candidate: 29 January 2025; Validated as PSD candidate: 2 February 2025; BEC registration: 9 March 2025; BEC validation: 11 March 2025; BEC validation upheld by Constitutional Court: 11 March 2025
Elena Lasconi	Am curaj să fac dreptate! (lit. 'I have courage to do justice!') (website)	Mayor of Câmpulung (2024–present)	Affiliation: USR (Note: The party withdrew its support in favour of Dan, but Lasconi remained on the ballot as a USR candidate)	Announced as still being the USR candidate: 10 January 2025; BEC registration: 13 March 2025; BEC validation: 15 March 2025 USR withdraws support: 9 April 2025
Cristian Terheș	Credincios națiunii române (lit. 'Faithful to the Romanian nation')	MEP (2019–present)	Affiliation: PNCR	BEC registration: 13 March 2025; BEC validation: 15 March 2025
Lavinia Șandru	România Reală (lit. 'Real Romania')	Deputy (2004–2008)	Affiliation: PUSL	BEC registration: 14 March 2025; BEC validation: 15 March 2025
Victor Ponta	România pe primul loc! (lit. 'Romania First!') (website)	Prime Minister (2012–2015); Deputy (2004–2020, 2024–present); Minister of Parliamentary Relations (2008–2009)	Affiliation: none Endorsed by: PRR, PER, PRO, RoSAT, PRM, and PPMP	Expressed interest: 19 January 2025; Announced the collecting of supporting signatures: 5 February 2025; Announced intention to run: 19 February 2025; Launched campaign/program: 6 March 2025; BEC registration: 12 March 2025; BEC validation: 14 March 2025
Sebastian Popescu	No campaign information	No previous public office	Affiliation: PNR	BEC registration: 15 March 2025; BEC validation: 17 March 2025
Silviu Predoiu	Competență. Character. Curaj. (lit. 'Competence. Character. Courage.') (website)	Acting chief of Foreign Intelligence Service (2006–2007); First deputy chief of Foreign Intelligence Service (2005–2018)	Affiliation: PLAN	BEC registration: 15 March 2025; BEC validation: 17 March 2025
John Ion Banu	Democrația și Civilizația trebuiesc apărate de către cetățeni (lit. 'Democracy and Civilization must be defended by citizens') (website)	No previous public office	Affiliation: none	BEC registration: 14 March 2025; BEC validation: 15 March 2025
Daniel Funeriu	Asta-i direcția! (lit. 'This is the direction!')	Minister of Education (2009–2012), MEP (2008–2009)	Affiliation: none	BEC registration: 15 March 2025; BEC validation: 17 March 2025

=== Registered, but later withdrawn candidates ===
Name	Campaign slogan	Public Office Experience	Party and endorsements	Candidacy and withdrawal related dates
Anamaria Gavrilă	No campaign information	Deputy (2020–present)	Affiliation: POT	BEC registration: 14 March 2025; BEC validation: 15 March 2025; Withdrawn: 19 March 2025

=== Rejected candidates ===
The following is a list of people that have filed a candidacy at the Central Electoral Bureau and were rejected for not complying the legal requirements to be allowed to run.

Name	Campaign slogan	Public office experience	Party and endorsements	Candidacy related dates
Petru Mîndru	No campaign information	No previous public office	Affiliation: none	BEC registration: 6 March 2025; BEC rejection: 6 March 2025; Second BEC registration: 13 March 2025; Second BEC rejection: 15 March 2025; Third BEC registration: 15 March 2025; Third BEC rejection: 17 March 2025
Maria Marcu	No campaign information	No previous public office	Affiliation: none	BEC registration: 7 March 2025; BEC rejection: 9 March 2025; Second BEC registration: 9 March 2025; Second BEC rejection: 11 March 2025; Third BEC registration: 14 March 2025; Third BEC rejection: 15 March 2025; Fourth BEC registration: 15 March 2025; Fourth BEC rejection: 17 March 2025
Ion Popa	No campaign information	No previous public office	Affiliation: none	BEC registration: 7 March 2025; BEC rejection: 9 March 2025
Călin Georgescu	No campaign information	Executive director of the UN Global Sustainable Index Institute Foundation in Geneva (2015–2016); Executive director of the National Center of Sustainable Development (1997–2013); Secretary of State with the Ministry of Environment (c. 2010)	Affiliation: none Endorsed by: AUR and POT	BEC registration: 7 March 2025; BEC rejection: 9 March 2025; BEC rejection upheld by Constitutional Court: 11 March 2025
Matei Vanea	No campaign information	No previous public office	Affiliation: none	BEC registration: 13 March 2025; BEC rejection: 15 March 2025
Paul Ipsas	No campaign information	No previous public office	Affiliation: none	BEC registration: 14 March 2025; BEC rejection: 15 March 2025
Constantin Vieriu	No campaign information	No previous public office	Affiliation: none	BEC registration: 13 March 2025; BEC rejection: 15 March 2025
Diana Iovanovici Șoșoacă	No campaign information	MEP (2024–present); Senator (2020–2024)	Affiliation: S.O.S. Romania	BEC registration: 13 March 2025; BEC rejection: 15 March 2025
Tiță Gicu-Romeo	No campaign information	No previous public office	Affiliation: none	BEC registration: 15 March 2025; BEC rejection: 17 March 2025
Remus Pricopie	No campaign information	Minister of Education (2012–2014)	Affiliation: none	BEC registration: 15 March 2025; BEC rejection: 17 March 2025
Oana Crețu	No campaign information	No previous public office	Affiliation: PSDU	BEC registration: 15 March 2025; BEC rejection: 17 March 2025
Constantin-Titian Filip	No campaign information	No previous public office	Affiliation: none	BEC registration: 15 March 2025; BEC rejection: 17 March 2025
Gelu Drăgan	No campaign information	No previous public office	Affiliation: none	BEC registration: 15 March 2025; BEC rejection: 17 March 2025

=== Expressed interest publicly but failed to register in time ===
Name	Campaign slogan	Public office experience	Party and endorsements	Candidacy related dates
Cristian Sima	Schimbă Constituția (Change the Constitution) cristiansima.ro/ schimbaconstitutia.ro/	No campaign information	Affiliation: none	Announced intention to run: 27 December 2024; Announced failure to rally enough support (signatures): 15 March 2025
Ana Birchall	No campaign information	Deputy Prime Minister (2018–2019); Minister of Justice; Deputy (2012–2020)	Affiliation: none	Announced intention to run: 7 January 2025 did not register by the deadline; no public statement regarding the elections
Anton Pisaroglu	No campaign information	No previous public office	Affiliation: none	Announced intention to run: 11 March 2025; Announced renounciation at filing his candidacy: 15 March 2025

=== Declined to run ===
Name	Public office experience	Party and endorsements
Ilie Bolojan	Acting president of Romania (2025); President of the Senate (2024–present); President of Bihor County (2020–2024); Mayor of Oradea (2008–2020)	Affiliation: PNL
Dan Puric	No previous public office	Affiliation: none
Cătălin Avramescu	Former Ambassador to Finland and Estonia	Affiliation: none
Marcel Ciolacu	Prime Minister of Romania (2023–2025); President of the Chamber of Deputies (2019–2020; 2021–2023)	Affiliation: PSD

== Debates ==
The debates (Note: In order for a debate to be counted as such, there must be at least two candidates present. The following situations are not considered proper debates: one candidate with one or multiple interviewers; one candidate with a representative (or more) of other candidate(s); only representatives of candidates (no matter how many candidates were represented); one candidate debating a previously recorded video of other candidate(s); short live statements of a candidate (via telephone or video streaming) inserted during a show with only one (other) candidate; short coincidental encounters of candidates (in a non-previously organised debate) that spoke to each other (and were recorded, even on professional cameras in TV studios). Any debate must be publicly broadcast. Negotiations behind closed doors, "strategic meetings" among candidates or any other type of discreet talks are not proper debates, even if their content (or bits of it) was released to the public, with/without the candidates' approval of its release. Debates may be broadcast on radio, television, or the internet. Candidates may show up in person or participate in the debate via telephone or video streaming for the entire debate time. Candidates who left the debate before 10% of the debate time elapsed (after a few words or several minutes) are considered absentees and their leaving is noted as such. In this particular situation (if it will occur), the debate is considered a valid one, because at least two candidates were present at its beginning. Candidates who left before the debate's ending are considered present, with their particular situation noted as such. Re-runs or syndication are not counted as different debates.) started on 8 April 2025, four days after the start of the campaign.

Debate schedule
Debate	Date	Sponsor(s)	Moderator(s)	Ref.
1	8 April 2025	TVR 1	Ramona Avramescu	
2	9 April 2025	TVR Info	Roxana Zamfirescu; Claudiu Lucaci	
3	9 April 2025	A7 TV	Flori Stoian	
4	10 April 2025	TVR Info	Roxana Zamfirescu; Claudiu Lucaci	
5	10 April 2025	Radio România Actualități	Alexandra Andon	
6	14 April 2025	TVR Info	Roxana Zamfirescu; Claudiu Lucaci	
7	15 April 2025	TVR 1	Ramona Avramescu; Marian Voicu	
8	15 April 2025	TVR Info	Roxana Zamfirescu; Claudiu Lucaci	
9	16 April 2025	TVR 1	Ramona Avramescu; Marian Voicu	
10	23 April 2025	TVR 1	Ramona Avramescu; Marian Voicu	
11	28 April 2025	Digi24	Cosmin Prelipceanu; Liliana Ruse	
12	29 April 2025	TVR 1	Ramona Avramescu; Marian Voicu	
13	30 April 2025	Antena 3 CNN	Mihai Gâdea	
14	8 May 2025	Euronews	Andra Miron; Monica Mihai	

=== Participation ===
The following is a table of participating candidates in each debate:

Participating candidates
Candidate
Candidate	P Present (on spot or through a video/audio live call) N Not invited/Invitation declined A Absent (Invitation accepted, but failed to show up or downgraded their presence to a representative)														Total
Candidate	1	2	3	4	5	6	7	8	9	10	11	12	13	14	Total
Simion	A	N	N	N	N	N	A	N	N	N	A (Note: Simion showed up to the debate but walked off stage, after giving a bouquet of flowers to Elena Lasconi, to protest the annulment of the 2024 presidential election)	A	N	P	1
Antonescu	N	N	A	N	N	N	N	N	A	N	P	P	P	N	3
Lasconi	N	N	A	N	N	N	N	N	N	N	P	P	P	N	3
Terheș	N	N	P	N	N	N	N	P	P	P	N	P	P	N	6
Șandru	N	N	N	N	N	N	N	P	N	N	N	P	P	N	3
Ponta	N	A	N	N	N	A	N	N	N	N	A	P	N	N	1
Popescu	N	P	P	P	P	N	P	N	N	P	N	P	N	N	7
Predoiu	N	N	N	P	P	N	N	N	N	N	N	P	N	N	3
Banu	P	P	N	N	P	P	N	N	P	N	N	P	P	N	7
Funeriu	P	N	N	N	N	P	P	N	N	P	N	P	P	N	6
Dan	N	N	N	N	N	N	N	N	N	N	P	P	P	P	4

== Opinion polls ==
=== Graphical summary ===
Graphical summary of the first-round opinion polls: Simion Dan Antonescu Ponta Lasconi Sandru Funeriu Terhes ~~Georgescu~~ ~~Șoșoacă~~

=== Second round ===
==== Nicușor Dan vs George Simion ====
Poll	Date	Sample	Dan Ind.	Simion AUR	Others	Lead
Election result	18 May 2025	11.507.695	53.60	46.40	—N/a	7.2
Avangarde (second exit poll)	18 May 2025	—N/a	54.2	45.8	—N/a	8.4
Avangarde (first exit poll)	18 May 2025	—N/a	54.9	45.1	—N/a	9.8
ARA (exit poll)	18 May 2025	—N/a	51.5	48.5	—N/a	3
CURS (exit poll)	18 May 2025	—N/a	54	46	—N/a	8
Sociopol (exit poll)	18 May 2025	—N/a	50	50	—N/a	0
AtlasIntel	13–15 May 2025	5,628	48.7	47.8	3.5	0.9
IRSOP	10–13 May 2025	951	52	48	—N/a	4
Sociopol	10–12 May 2025	1,024	47	53	—N/a	6
AtlasIntel	9–12 May 2025	3,995	48.2	48.2	3.6	0
MKOR	8–14 May 2025	3,357	34.2	32	33.8	2.2
CURS	8–11 May 2025	3,042	48	52	—N/a	4
Verifield	6 May 2025	944	45.2	54.8	—N/a	9.6
First round on 4 May
AtlasIntel	28 Apr–1 May 2025	3,247	40	37	23	3
Noi, Cetățenii	24–30 Apr 2025	1,378	55	45	—N/a	10
MKOR	24–27 Apr 2025	1,750	29	28	43	1
FlashData	24–26 Apr 2025	7,500	40.0	45.5	14.5	5.5
AtlasIntel	17–22 Apr 2025	3,701	42	39	19	3
AtlasIntel	10–13 Apr 2025	2,994	40.7	37.5	21.8	3.2
ARA	9–13 Apr 2025	1,115	48	52	—N/a	4
CURS	3–10 Apr 2025	1,214	46	54	—N/a	6
FlashData	3–5 Apr 2025	7,500	58	42	—N/a	14
Sociopol	31 Mar–4 Apr 2025	1.007	47	53	—N/a	6
Noi, Cetățenii	28 Mar–8 Apr 2025	1,488	60	40	—N/a	20
MKOR	26–28 Mar 2025	1,500	35	31	35	4
Sociopol	17–18 Mar 2025	1,005	48	52	—N/a	4
AtlasIntel	13–15 Mar 2025	2,381	42.1	35.3	22.6	6.8
Noi, Cetățenii	23 Dec 2024–13 Jan 2025	1,067	54	46	—N/a	8

=== First round (after BEC deadline) ===
Poll	Date	Sample	Margin of error	Simion AUR	Dan Ind.	Antonescu A.Ro	Ponta Ind.	Lasconi USR	Sandru PUSL	Funeriu Ind.	Terhes PNCR	Banu Ind.	Popescu PNR	Predoiu PLAN	Others	Lead
Election result	4 May 2025	9.430.274	—N/a	40.96	20.99	20.07	13.04	2.68	0.64	0.53	0.39	0.23	0.28	0.18	—N/a	19.97
CURS (exit poll)	4 May 2025	—N/a	—N/a	33.3	21	22.8	14.5	4.4	—N/a	—N/a	—N/a	—N/a	—N/a	—N/a	4	10.5
Avangarde (exit poll)	4 May 2025	—N/a	—N/a	31.1	24.5	24.5	14.5	3.8	—N/a	—N/a	—N/a	—N/a	—N/a	—N/a	2.1	6.6
Sociopol (exit poll)	4 May 2025	—N/a	—N/a	35	20	20	19	3	—N/a	—N/a	—N/a	—N/a	—N/a	—N/a	3	15
INSCOP (exit poll)	4 May 2025	—N/a	—N/a	36.2	20.6	21.5	17.1	2.5	1	0.4	0.2	0.2	0.2	0.1	—N/a	14.7
AtlasIntel	28 Apr–1 May 2025	3,247	± 2	31	23	25	11.7	6.5	1.1	0.4	0.8	—N/a	—N/a	—N/a	0.6	6
Sociopol	28–30 Apr 2025	1,003	± 3.2	34	19	19	22	5	—N/a	—N/a	—N/a	—N/a	—N/a	—N/a	1	12
Noi, Cetățenii	24–30 Apr 2025	1,378	± 2.6	30.5	26.5	20.5	10.4	8.6	—N/a	2.6	—N/a	—N/a	—N/a	—N/a	0.9	4
MKOR	24–27 Apr 2025	1,750	± 2.5	33.1	19.4	21	14.8	7.3	2.2	0.6	0.6	0.9	—N/a	0.2	—N/a	12.1
FlashData	24–26 Apr 2025	7,500	± 3.5	29	23	26	8	7.5	2.1	1.2	0.2	—N/a	—N/a	—N/a	3	3
Sociopol	24–26 Apr 2025	1,001	± 3.2	35	16	17	23	8	—N/a	—N/a	—N/a	—N/a	—N/a	—N/a	1	12
ARA	21–25 Apr 2025	1,115	± 3	26.8	20	26.2	10.5	10	3.5	—N/a	—N/a	—N/a	—N/a	—N/a	3	0.6
DataEcho	22–24 Apr 2025	2,607	± 2.5	26.7	26.5	20.3	14.4	6.6	1.1	0.4	0.2	0.9	—N/a	0.3	1.5	0.2
Sociopol	21–23 Apr 2025	1,002	± 3.2	34	16	16	23	10	—N/a	—N/a	—N/a	—N/a	—N/a	—N/a	1	11
AtlasIntel	17–22 Apr 2025	3,701	± 2	33.3	23	23.6	10.7	5.7	1.1	0.9	0.3	—N/a	—N/a	—N/a	1.3	9.7
ARA	15–19 Apr 2025	1,107	± 3	26.5	19.5	26	11	10	3.5	—N/a	—N/a	—N/a	—N/a	—N/a	3.5	0.5
Sociopol	14–17 Apr 2025	1,005	± 3.2	35	14	17	22	11	—N/a	—N/a	—N/a	—N/a	—N/a	—N/a	1	13
IRSOP	4–14 Apr 2025	1,030	± 3	31	28	17	18	4	—N/a	—N/a	—N/a	—N/a	—N/a	—N/a	2	3
AtlasIntel	10–13 Apr 2025	2,994	± 2	34.4	21.8	25.5	10	5.2	—N/a	—N/a	—N/a	—N/a	—N/a	—N/a	3.1	8.9
ARA	9–13 Apr 2025	1,115	± 3	25.8	20.3	25.3	10.6	9	3.5	—N/a	—N/a	—N/a	—N/a	—N/a	5.5	0.5
FlashData	10–12 Apr 2025	7,500	± 3.5	27	20	26	8	9	4.8	1.3	0.3	—N/a	—N/a	0.5	3.1	1
DataEcho	10–11 Apr 2025	3,562	± 2.6	24.9	29.5	22.8	10.9	9.1	0.3	0.8	0.2	0.4	—N/a	0.2	1	4.6
Sociopol	7–11 Apr 2025	1,002	± 3.2	34	16	15	23	10	—N/a	—N/a	—N/a	—N/a	—N/a	—N/a	2	11
CURS	3–10 Apr 2025	1,214	± 2.8	26	19	23	16	8	—N/a	—N/a	3	—N/a	—N/a	—N/a	5	3
Noi, Cetățenii	28 Mar–8 Apr 2025	1,488	± 2.5	30	29.6	19.6	8.3	7.8	—N/a	2.1	—N/a	—N/a	—N/a	—N/a	2.7	3.4
USR	2–7 Apr 2025	1,149	± 2.9	40.8	16.9	14.5	20.4	4.1	—N/a	—N/a	—N/a	—N/a	—N/a	—N/a	3.3	20.4
FlashData	3–5 Apr 2025	7,500	± 3.5	28	23	26	9	6	4.6	1.5	0.5	—N/a	0.1	0.2	1.1	2
Sociopol	31 Mar–4 Apr 2025	1,007	± 3.2	35	16	15	23	10	—N/a	—N/a	—N/a	—N/a	—N/a	—N/a	1	12
USR	24–29 Mar 2025	1,112	± 2.94	37.2	19.2	13.8	21.6	6.5	—N/a	—N/a	—N/a	—N/a	—N/a	—N/a	1.7	15.6
MKOR	26–28 Mar 2025	1,500	± 2.5	31.2	22.7	18.8	17.1	5.3	1.1	0.6	2.2	0.4	0.4	0.3	—N/a	8.5
Verifield	24–28 Mar 2025	1,100	± 2.95	35	20.8	16.4	21.1	4.3	0.7	1.1	0.3	—N/a	—N/a	—N/a	0.3	13.9
ARA	18–25 Mar 2025	1,015	± 3	27	18	24	11	12	3	—N/a	—N/a	—N/a	—N/a	—N/a	5	3
Avangarde	19–23 Mar 2025	1,300	± 2.3	30	21	23	14	8	—N/a	1	—N/a	—N/a	—N/a	—N/a	3	7
CURS	19–22 Mar 2025	1,203	± 2.8	29	18	22	13	12	—N/a	—N/a	—N/a	—N/a	—N/a	—N/a	6	7
Sociopol	17–18 Mar 2025	1,005	—N/a	37	16	14	22	10	—N/a	1	—N/a	—N/a	—N/a	—N/a	—N/a	15

Furthermore, in a poll among Moldovans with Romanian citizenship, 15.4% stated they would vote for Dan, 11.5% for Lasconi, 7.2% for Antonescu, 3.8% for Simion, 1.8% for Ponta and 0.8% for other candidates. 37.6% stated they were undecided, 18% that they would not vote and 3.9% did not answer. The poll was conducted by iData in April, with a sample of 1,027. According to iData, 500,000–550,000 Romanian citizens with the right to vote in the election lived in Moldova at the time.

=== First round (before BEC deadline) ===
Poll	Date	Sample	Georgescu Ind.	Lasconi USR	Simion AUR	Becali AUR	Bolojan PNL	Terhes PNCR	Birchall Ind.	Dan Ind.	Antonescu A.Ro	Ponta Ind.	Șoșoacă S.O.S.	Funeriu Ind.	Gavrilă POT	Sandru PUSL	Others	Lead
AtlasIntel	13–15 Mar 2025	2,381	—N/a	3.9	30.4	—N/a	—N/a	—N/a	—N/a	26.0	17.9	9.0	—N/a	1.8	—N/a	0.6	10.5	4.4
AtlasIntel	13–15 Mar 2025	2,381	—N/a	3.9	—N/a	—N/a	—N/a	—N/a	—N/a	25.3	17.7	9.2	—N/a	2.5	30.2	0.5	10.6	4.9
Sociopol	3–7 Mar 2025	1,000	38	8	10	—N/a	—N/a	—N/a	—N/a	14	14	16	—N/a	—N/a	—N/a	—N/a	—N/a	22
Sociopol	3–7 Mar 2025	1,000	—N/a	12	28	—N/a	—N/a	—N/a	—N/a	19	18	22	—N/a	—N/a	—N/a	—N/a	1	6
MKOR	25–28 Feb 2025	1,100	44.1	9.4	0.6	1.8	14.7	—N/a	—N/a	14.2	8.9	4.2	—N/a	—N/a	—N/a	—N/a	2.1	29.4
Verifield	14–28 Feb 2025	1,000	41.1	7.0	—N/a	—N/a	—N/a	1.0	—N/a	12.4	18.5	—N/a	3.0	1.0	—N/a	—N/a	16	22.6
AtlasIntel	21–24 Feb 2025	2,947	38.4	5.8	0.9	—N/a	—N/a	—N/a	—N/a	25.4	15.8	7.5	—N/a	—N/a	—N/a	—N/a	6.2	13
FlashData	14–16 Feb 2025	7,500	37	9	—N/a	—N/a	—N/a	—N/a	0.5	21	17	5	3	1	—N/a	—N/a	6.5	16
Sociopol	10–14 Feb 2025	1,001	45	10	6	—N/a	—N/a	—N/a	—N/a	10	10	16	2	—N/a	—N/a	—N/a	1	29
Sociopol	10–14 Feb 2025	1,001	—N/a	9	24	—N/a	—N/a	—N/a	—N/a	16	14	22	9	—N/a	—N/a	—N/a	1	2
Sociopol	27–30 Jan 2025	1,003	47	8	4	—N/a	—N/a	—N/a	—N/a	10	10	16	4	—N/a	—N/a	—N/a	1	31
Sociopol	27–30 Jan 2025	1,003	—N/a	9	24	—N/a	—N/a	—N/a	—N/a	16	14	22	14	—N/a	—N/a	—N/a	1	2
CURS	21–25 Jan 2025	1,100	37	7	—N/a	—N/a	—N/a	—N/a	—N/a	21	18	—N/a	4	—N/a	—N/a	—N/a	13	16
CURS	21–25 Jan 2025	1,100	—N/a	13	25	—N/a	—N/a	—N/a	—N/a	24	23	—N/a	—N/a	—N/a	—N/a	—N/a	15	1
Avangarde	10–16 Jan 2025	1,354	38	6	6	—N/a	—N/a	—N/a	—N/a	17	25	—N/a	5	—N/a	—N/a	—N/a	3	13
Sociopol	10–15 Jan 2025	1,001	50	10	6	—N/a	—N/a	—N/a	—N/a	10	8	15	5	—N/a	—N/a	—N/a	1	35
Sociopol	10–15 Jan 2025	1,001	—N/a	13	35	—N/a	—N/a	—N/a	—N/a	13	10	26	—N/a	—N/a	—N/a	—N/a	3	9
Noi, Cetățenii	23 Dec 2024–13 Jan 2025	1,067	35	8	2	—N/a	—N/a	—N/a	—N/a	25	16	8	8	—N/a	—N/a	—N/a	6	10
Noi, Cetățenii	23 Dec 2024–13 Jan 2025	1,067	—N/a	9	30	—N/a	—N/a	—N/a	—N/a	26	16	12	—N/a	—N/a	—N/a	—N/a	7	4
Election	24 November 2024	9,242,186	22.94	19.18	13.86 (Note: With the candidacy of Simion)		8.79 (Note: With the candidacy of Ciucă)	1.04	0.46	—	—	—	—	—	—	—	33.73	3.76

=== Hypothetical second-round scenarios ===
==== Antonescu vs Simion ====
Hypothetical polling

Poll	Date	Sample	Antonescu A.Ro	Simion AUR	Others	Lead
AtlasIntel	28 Apr-1 May 2025	3,247	47	37	16	10
Noi, Cetățenii	24–30 Apr 2025	1,378	57	43	—N/a	14
MKOR	24–27 Apr 2025	1,750	31	28	41	3
FlashData	24–26 Apr 2025	7,500	46	42	12	4
AtlasIntel	17–22 Apr 2025	3,701	44	39	17	5
AtlasIntel	10–13 Apr 2025	2,994	49.2	36.3	14.4	12.9
ARA	9–13 Apr 2025	1,115	56	44	—N/a	12
CURS	3–10 Apr 2025	1,214	52	48	—N/a	4
FlashData	3–5 Apr 2025	7,500	61	39	—N/a	22
Sociopol	31 Mar–4 Apr 2025	1.007	45	55	—N/a	10
Noi, Cetățenii	28 Mar–8 Apr 2025	1,488	61	39	—N/a	22
MKOR	26–28 Mar 2025	1,500	33	31	36	2
Sociopol	17–18 Mar 2025	1,005	46	54	—N/a	8

==== Ponta vs Simion ====
Hypothetical polling

Poll	Date	Sample	Ponta Ind.	Simion AUR	Others	Lead
AtlasIntel	28 Apr-1 May 2025	3,247	28	34	38	6
Noi, Cetățenii	24–30 Apr 2025	1,378	53	47	—N/a	8
MKOR	24–27 Apr 2025	1,750	25	28	47	3
AtlasIntel	17–22 Apr 2025	3,701	26	36	39	10
AtlasIntel	10–13 Apr 2025	2,994	23.4	36.3	40.4	12.9
ARA	9–13 Apr 2025	1,115	44	56	—N/a	12
Sociopol	31 Mar–4 Apr 2025	1.007	54	46	—N/a	8
MKOR	26–28 Mar 2025	1,500	30	30	40	0
Sociopol	17–18 Mar 2025	1,005	46	54	—N/a	8

==== Antonescu vs Dan ====
Hypothetical polling

Poll	Date	Sample	Antonescu A.Ro	Dan Ind.	Others	Lead
AtlasIntel	28 Apr-1 May 2025	3,247	33	29	38	4
Noi, Cetățenii	24–30 Apr 2025	1,378	54	46	—N/a	8
MKOR	24–27 Apr 2025	1,750	21	24	55	3
FlashData	24–26 Apr 2025	7,500	48	40	12	8
AtlasIntel	17–22 Apr 2025	3,701	31	28	41	3
AtlasIntel	10–13 Apr 2025	2,994	34.4	26.4	39.2	8
ARA	9–13 Apr 2025	1,115	56	44	—N/a	12
CURS	3–10 Apr 2025	1,214	52	48	—N/a	4
FlashData	3–5 Apr 2025	7,500	55	45	—N/a	10
Noi, Cetățenii	28 Mar–8 Apr 2025	1,488	44	56	—N/a	12
MKOR	26–28 Mar 2025	1,500	22	30	48	8
AtlasIntel	13–15 Mar 2025	2,381	25.1	35.2	39.6	10.1

==== Antonescu vs Ponta ====
Hypothetical polling

Poll	Date	Sample	Antonescu A.Ro	Ponta Ind.	Others	Lead
Noi, Cetățenii	24–30 Apr 2025	1,378	69	31	—N/a	38
MKOR	24–27 Apr 2025	1,750	28	19	53	11
FlashData	24–26 Apr 2025	7,500	52	36	12	16
FlashData	3–5 Apr 2025	7,500	67	33	—N/a	34
MKOR	26–28 Mar 2025	1,500	29	25	45	4

==== Dan vs Lasconi ====
Hypothetical polling

Poll	Date	Sample	Dan Ind.	Lasconi USR	Others	Lead
AtlasIntel	13–15 Mar 2025	2,381	41.4	5.2	53.4	35.9

==== Dan vs Ponta ====
Hypothetical polling

Poll	Date	Sample	Dan Ind.	Ponta Ind.	Others	Lead
AtlasIntel	28 Apr-1 May 2025	3,247	40	37	23	3
Noi, Cetățenii	24–30 Apr 2025	1,378	59	41	—N/a	18
MKOR	24–27 Apr 2025	1,750	30	20	50	10
FlashData	24–26 Apr 2025	7,500	48	42	10	6
CURS	3–10 Apr 2025	1,214	50	50	—N/a	0
FlashData	3–5 Apr 2025	7,500	61	39	—N/a	22
MKOR	26–28 Mar 2025	1,500	33	24	42	9
AtlasIntel	13–15 Mar 2025	2,381	43.2	17.5	39.3	25.7
Noi, Cetățenii	23 Dec 2024–13 Jan 2025	1,067	55	45	—N/a	10

==== Lasconi vs Simion ====
Hypothetical polling

Poll	Date	Sample	Lasconi USR	Simion AUR	Others	Lead
AtlasIntel	28 Apr-1 May 2025	3,247	43	35	22	8
MKOR	24–27 Apr 2025	1,750	30	30	40	0
AtlasIntel	17–22 Apr 2025	3,701	41	39	20	2
AtlasIntel	10–13 Apr 2025	2,994	40.3	36.8	22.9	3.5
MKOR	26–28 Mar 2025	1,500	30	31	39	1

==== Antonescu vs Georgescu ====
Hypothetical polling

Poll	Date	Sample	Antonescu A.Ro	Georgescu Ind.	Others	Lead
Avangarde	10–16 Jan 2025	1,354	38	39	23	1

==== Bolojan vs Georgescu ====
Hypothetical polling

Poll	Date	Sample	Bolojan PNL	Georgescu Ind.	Others	Lead
MKOR	25–28 Feb 2025	1,100	42	40	18	2

==== Dan vs Gavrila ====
Hypothetical polling

Poll	Date	Sample	Dan Ind.	Gavrilă POT	Others	Lead
AtlasIntel	13–15 Mar 2025	2,381	40.1	31.7	28.3	8.4

==== Dan vs Georgescu ====
Hypothetical polling

Poll	Date	Sample	Dan Ind.	Georgescu Ind.	Others	Lead
MKOR	25–28 Feb 2025	1,100	36	42	22	6
AtlasIntel	21–24 Feb 2025	2,947	45.0	40.9	14.1	4.1
Noi, Cetățenii	23 Dec 2024–16 Feb 2025	1,067	50	50	—N/a	0
Avangarde	10–16 Jan 2025	1,354	32	43	25	9

==== Georgescu vs Lasconi ====
Hypothetical polling

Poll	Date	Sample	Georgescu Ind.	Lasconi USR	Others	Lead
Avangarde	10–16 Jan 2025	1,354	44	31	25	13

== Endorsements ==
=== Political parties ===
Endorsements from parliamentary parties
Parliamentary parties	Ideology	First round	Second round
Social Democratic Party	Social democracy	Crin Antonescu	No endorsement
Alliance for the Union of Romanians	Right-wing populism	George Simion	George Simion
National Liberal Party	Liberal conservatism	Crin Antonescu	Nicușor Dan
Save Romania Union	Liberalism	~~Elena Lasconi~~	Nicușor Dan
Save Romania Union	Liberalism	Nicușor Dan	Nicușor Dan
S.O.S. Romania	Ultranationalism	Invalid	Invalid
Party of Young People	Right-wing populism	George Simion	George Simion
Democratic Alliance of Hungarians	Hungarian minority interests	Crin Antonescu	Nicușor Dan

Ethnic minority parties endorsements
Ethnic minority parties		Ideology	First round	Second round
GPMN	Union of the Ukrainians	Ukrainian minority interests	Crin Antonescu	Nicușor Dan
GPMN	Federation of the Jewish Communities	Jewish minority interests	Crin Antonescu	Against extremists
GPMN	Party of the Roma	Roma minority interests	Crin Antonescu	For a European Romania
GPMN	Democratic Forum of Germans	German minority interests	Crin Antonescu	For a European Romania
GPMN	Democratic Union of Slovaks and Czechs	Slovak minority interests	Crin Antonescu	For a European Romania
GPMN	Democratic Union of Turkic-Muslim Tatars	Tatar minority interests	Crin Antonescu	For human rights
Hungarian Alliance of Transylvania		Hungarian nationalism	Nicușor Dan	Nicușor Dan
Hungarian Civic Force		Hungarian minority interests	No endorsement	Nicușor Dan
Phralipe Party of the Roma		Roma minority interests	Crin Antonescu	Nicușor Dan
Alliance for Reform, Social Equity, Emancipation and Freedom		Roma minority interests	Against extremists	Nicușor Dan

Extraparliamentary parties endorsements
Extraparliamentary parties		Ideology	First round	Second round
Health Education Nature Sustainability Party		Progressivism	Nicușor Dan	Nicușor Dan
Force of the Right		Liberal conservatism	Nicușor Dan	Nicușor Dan
United Social Democratic Party		Christian left	Victor Ponta	Nicușor Dan
Renewing Romania's European Project		Liberalism	Nicușor Dan	Nicușor Dan
Justice and Respect in Europe for All Party		Anti-corruption	Nicușor Dan	Nicușor Dan
People's Movement Party		National conservatism	Nicușor Dan	Nicușor Dan
National Peasants' Party Maniu-Mihalache		Agrarianism	Nicușor Dan	Nicușor Dan
Courage		Liberalism	Nicușor Dan	Nicușor Dan
United Diaspora Party		Pro-Europeanism	Nicușor Dan	Nicușor Dan
Union for State Reform		Reformism	Nicușor Dan	Nicușor Dan
Nature, People, and Animals		Animal rights	Nicușor Dan	Nicușor Dan
Green Party		Green politics	For a European Romania	Nicușor Dan
Volt Romania		European federalism	No endorsement	Nicușor Dan
Democracy and Solidarity Party		Democratic socialism	Against far-right	Nicușor Dan
We, Ploieșteni Movement		Regionalism	Nicușor Dan	Nicușor Dan
Székelyudvarhelyért Party		Localism	Nicușor Dan	Nicușor Dan
PACT for Galați		Regionalism	No endorsement	Nicușor Dan
Future of Țara Făgărașului Local Party		Regionalism	No endorsement	Nicușor Dan
We Help Romania Together		Regionalism	No endorsement	Nicușor Dan
Berceni Local Action Group		Localism	For a European Romania	No endorsement
Nation People Together		Social democracy	No endorsement	For a European Romania
Party of Free People		Localism	No endorsement	Against Simion
Christian Democratic National Peasants' Party		Christian democracy	George Simion	George Simion
Geto-Dacian Union Party		Conservatism	George Simion	George Simion
Communists' Party		Communism	George Simion	George Simion
Romanian Socialist Party		Communism	George Simion	George Simion
Communist Party of the 21st Century		Marxism–Leninism	George Simion	George Simion
Social Democratic Workers' Party		Socialism	George Simion	George Simion
Patriots of the Romanian People		Romanian nationalism	George Simion	George Simion
BSR	Independent Social Democratic Party	Left wing nationalism	George Simion	George Simion
BSR	Romanian Nationhood Party	Romanian ultranationalism	No endorsement	George Simion
Our Romania Party		Romanian ultranationalism	No endorsement	George Simion
Romanian Hearth Union Party		Romanian ultranationalism	No endorsement	George Simion
Strong Romania Party		Romanian nationalism	No endorsement	George Simion
National Rebirth Alliance		Christian right	For Christian values	Against progressives
Romanian Village Party		Agrarianism	Victor Ponta	George Simion
Greater Romania Party		Romanian ultranationalism	Victor Ponta	George Simion
Republican Party		Romanian nationalism	Victor Ponta	For sovereigntism
Truth Democracy Education Reconstruction Party		Centrism	Victor Ponta	No endorsement
PRO Romania		Social liberalism	Victor Ponta	No endorsement
Romanian Ecologist Party		Green conservatism	Victor Ponta	No endorsement
Party for the Homeland, Military and Police		Militarism	Victor Ponta	No endorsement
Social Liberal Humanist Party		Conservative humanism	Lavinia Șandru	No endorsement
Romanian National Conservative Party		National conservatism	Cristian Terheș	No endorsement
New Romania Party		Populism	Sebastian Popescu	No endorsement
National Action League Party		Social liberalism	Silviu Predoiu	No endorsement
The Right Alternative		Libertarian conservatism	Right-conservative	Right-wing
National Peasant Alliance		Social conservatism	No endorsement	Lesser evil
Romanian Nation Party		Christian democracy	John Ion Banu	Boycott

Endorsements from European Parliament groups
Organization	Political groups of the European Parliament	Ideology	First round	Second round
European Union	European People's Party Group	Christian democracy	No endorsement	Nicușor Dan
European Union	Progressive Alliance of Socialists and Democrats	Social democracy	No endorsement	Nicușor Dan
European Union	European Conservatives and Reformists Group	National conservatism	George Simion	George Simion
European Union	Renew Europe	Liberalism	No endorsement	Nicușor Dan
European Union	Greens–European Free Alliance	Green politics	No endorsement	Nicușor Dan
European Union	Union of European Federalists	European federalism	No endorsement	Nicușor Dan

Endorsements from international political parties
Country	Party		Ideology	First round	Second round
Austria	Freedom Party of Austria		Right-wing populism	No endorsement	George Simion
France	National Rally		Right-wing populism	No endorsement	George Simion
Germany	Alternative for Germany		Right-wing populism	No endorsement	George Simion
Germany	Association of Transylvanian Saxons		Transylvanian Saxon minority interests	No endorsement	For a European Romania
Hungary	Fidesz		Right-wing populism	No endorsement	~~George Simion~~ (disputed) (Note: On 9 May 2025, Orbán quoted and commented on Simion in the context of a speech at Tihany Abbey: "'Now comes the time of a Europe of nations, a Christian Europe, within which we will fight for our right to be European citizens.' This was not said in Hungary, but in neighboring Romania. We totally agree. We share a common historical destiny with the Romanians. We are not going to intervene in the ongoing electoral fight for the Romanian presidency, but we do send this message from here, from the center of the Carpathian Basin, from this symbolic place: we can assure Romania's people and future president that we stand on the common ground of solidarity and cooperation and that we therefore will not support any attempt to isolate or enact political vengeance upon Romania and its leaders." The Hungarian press, both in Hungary and in the diaspora, interpreted this as an endorsement of Simion. Orbán denied this was an endorsement and, after speaking with RMDSZ leader Hunor Kelemen the following day, clarified that he supported whatever endorsement RMDSZ issued. RMDSZ subsequently endorsed Dan, but Orbán did not explicitly do so. After the elections, Orbán expressed that he had been "surprised" by the "storm" his "comments in relation to Simion" had caused in the diaspora. Orbán added that it was "correct" that "Romanian Hungarians not cooperate with the far right—though, of course, neither with the far left. In other words, that they not cooperate with those who are enemies of the Hungarians. As to who are Hungarians' enemies: that is something you all, here in Transylvania, know better than anyone else anywhere else in the world.")
Hungary	Tisza Party		Conservatism	No endorsement	Against Simion
Moldova	Party of Action and Solidarity		Liberalism	Crin Antonescu	Nicușor Dan
Moldova	Moldovan National Party		Pro-Europeanism	No endorsement	Nicușor Dan
Moldova	Party of National Reunification "Acasă"		Moldovan–Romanian unionism	No endorsement	Nicușor Dan
Moldova	Together		Pro-Europeanism	Crin Antonescu	Nicușor Dan
Moldova	Liberal Party		Conservative liberalism	No endorsement	Nicușor Dan
Moldova	National Liberal Party		National liberalism	Crin Antonescu	No endorsement
Moldova	European Social Democratic Party		Social democracy	Crin Antonescu	No endorsement
Moldova	Coalition for Unity and Welfare		Liberalism	Pro-integration	No endorsement
Moldova	Alliance of Liberals and Democrats for Europe		Social liberalism	Pro-integration	For a European Romania
Moldova	BCS	Party of Communists	Marxism–Leninism	No endorsement	No endorsement
Moldova	BCS	Party of Socialists	Democratic socialism	No endorsement	George Simion
Moldova	Democracy at Home Party		Moldovan–Romanian unionism	George Simion	George Simion
Moldova	National Alternative Movement		Social democracy	No endorsement	George Simion (Note: A part of the party)
Moldova	Alliance for the Union of Romanians		Romanian nationalism	George Simion	George Simion
Serbia	Vlach National Party		Vlach (Romanian) minority politics	No endorsement	George Simion
Spain	Vox		Right-wing populism	No endorsement	George Simion

=== Other endorsements ===
Endorsements from first-round candidates
First-round candidate	First round	Endorsement
Crin Antonescu	20.07%	No endorsement
Victor Ponta	13.04%	No endorsement
Elena Lasconi	2.68%	Nicușor Dan
Lavinia Șandru	0.64%	No endorsement
Daniel Funeriu	0.53%	Nicușor Dan
Cristian Terheș	0.39%	No endorsement
Sebastian Popescu	0.28%	No endorsement
John Ion Banu	0.23%	Boycott
Silviu Predoiu	0.18%	No endorsement

Endorsements from withdrawn candidates
Candidate	First round	Second round
Anamaria Gavrilă	George Simion	George Simion

Endorsements from candidates in the 2024 annulled election
Candidate	First round	Second round
Călin Georgescu	George Simion	George Simion
Marcel Ciolacu	Crin Antonescu	No endorsement
Nicolae Ciucă	Crin Antonescu	Nicușor Dan
Hunor Kelemen	Crin Antonescu	Nicușor Dan
Ludovic Orban	Nicușor Dan	Nicușor Dan

Endorsements from other Romanian politicians
Politician	Public office	Party	First round	Second round
Traian Băsescu	Former President of Romania	PMP	Nicușor Dan	Nicușor Dan
Klaus Iohannis	Former President of Romania	PNL	No endorsement	For a European Romania
Ilie Bolojan	Acting President of Romania	PNL	Crin Antonescu	Nicușor Dan
Emil Boc	Mayor of Cluj-Napoca	PNL	Crin Antonescu	Nicușor Dan
Nicolae Ștefănuță	Member of the European Parliament	SENS	Nicușor Dan	Nicușor Dan
Alexandrin Moiseev	Deputy for Botoșani County	Independent	For a European Romania	Nicușor Dan
Ilan Laufer	President of the Romanian Sovereigntist Bloc	BSR	Victor Ponta	No endorsement
Viorica Dăncilă	Former Prime Minister of Romania	PNCR	Cristian Terheș	George Simion
Liviu Dragnea	Former Speaker of the Chamber of Deputies	PMRS	No endorsement	George Simion

Endorsements from foreign politicians
Politician	Public office	Party	Country	First round	Second round
Maia Sandu	President of Moldova	Party of Action and Solidarity	Moldova	No endorsement	Nicușor Dan
Donald Tusk	Prime Minister of Poland	Civic Platform	Poland	No endorsement	Nicușor Dan
Rafał Trzaskowski (Note: Candidate in the 2025 Polish presidential election, the first round of which took place on the same day as the second round of the Romanian election.)	Mayor of Warsaw	Civic Platform	Poland	No endorsement	Nicușor Dan
Emmanuel Macron	President of France	Renaissance	France	No endorsement	Nicușor Dan
Alberto Núñez Feijóo	Leader of the Opposition	People's Party	Spain	No endorsement	Nicușor Dan
Sergiu Mocanu	Former member of the Moldovan Parliament	Union Republic	Moldova	Nicușor Dan	Nicușor Dan
Vlad Filat	Former Prime Minister of Moldova	Liberal Democratic Party of Moldova	Moldova	No endorsement	George Simion
Marine Le Pen	Member of the National Assembly	National Rally	France	No endorsement	George Simion
Marion Maréchal	Member of the European Parliament	Identity-Liberties	France	No endorsement	George Simion
Viktor Orbán	Prime Minister of Hungary	Fidesz	Hungary	No endorsement	~~George Simion~~ (disputed)
Matteo Salvini	Deputy Prime Minister of Italy	Lega	Italy	No endorsement	George Simion
Giorgia Meloni	Prime Minister of Italy	Brothers of Italy	Italy	No endorsement	George Simion
Mateusz Morawiecki	Former Prime Minister of Poland	Law and Justice	Poland	George Simion	George Simion
Karol Nawrocki	President of the Institute of National Remembrance	Law and Justice	Poland	No endorsement	George Simion
Santiago Abascal	Member of the Congress of Deputies	Vox	Spain	George Simion	George Simion
Tamara Milenković	Former member of the National Assembly	Platform for Serbia	Serbia	No endorsement	George Simion

Religious endorsements
Denomination		Orientation	First round	Second round
Romanian Orthodox Church		Eastern Orthodoxy	No endorsement	No endorsement
Romanian Orthodox Church	Archdiocese of Tomis	Eastern Orthodoxy	No endorsement	George Simion
Evangelical Church of the Augsburg Confession		Lutheranism	No endorsement	Against Simion
Evangelical Lutheran Church		Lutheranism	No endorsement	Against extremists
Reformed Church		Calvinism	For Christian values	For a European Romania
Catholic Church	Archdiocese of Alba Iulia	Catholicism	No endorsement	Against extremists
Catholic Church	Diocese of Oradea Mare	Catholicism	No endorsement	Against extremists
Catholic Church	Diocese of Satu Mare	Catholicism	No endorsement	Against extremists
Catholic Church	Diocese of Timișoara	Catholicism	No endorsement	Against extremists
Unitarian Church of Transylvania		Unitarianism	No endorsement	Nicușor Dan

Celebrity endorsements
Nicușor Dan
- Andreea Bălan
- Ana Blandiana
- Mircea Cărtărescu
- Tudor Chirilă
- Delia
- Lora
- Dani Mocanu
- David Popovici
- Andreea Raicu
- Victor Rebengiuc
- Irina Rimes
- Florin Ristei
- Sebastian Stan
- Ștefan Bănică Jr.
- Gheboasă
George Simion
- Gigi Becali
- Dan Diaconescu
- Costi Ioniță
- Ilie Năstase
- Tzancă Uraganu

== Conduct ==
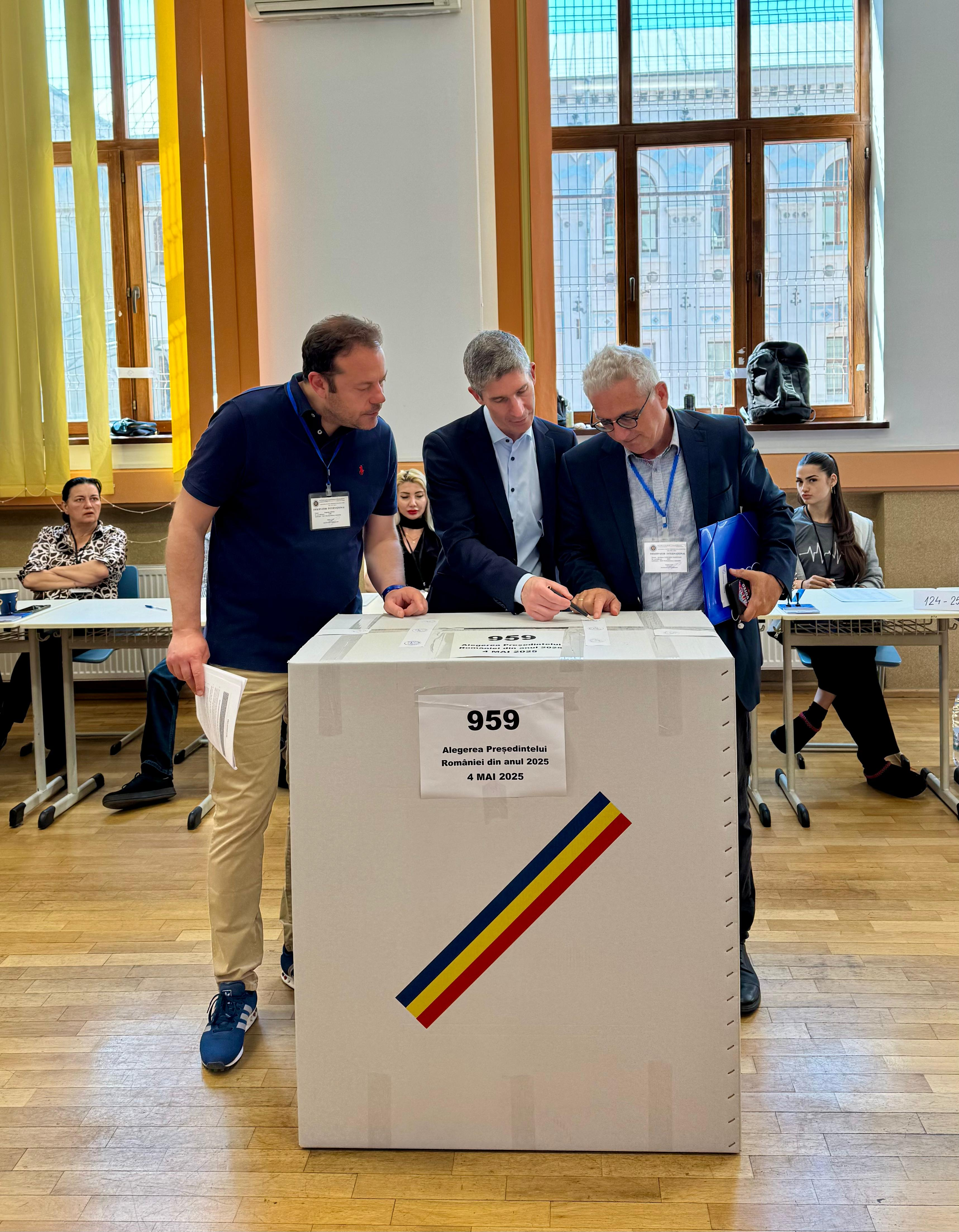
OSCE observers verifying ballot box seal at a Bucharest polling station

As per Romanian law, citizens could vote at the designated polling station inside the municipality, town or commune where they reside or at any other station outside of said jurisdiction, on a supplementary list. The counting process was recorded. Fifty-three Romanian politically non-affiliated organisations were accredited by the Permanent Electoral Authority to observe the election process. The AEP additionally approved access for 87 foreign journalists from outlets such as Sky News, Associated Press, Reuters, France 24 and the BBC as well as 159 representatives of the following organisations:

International observers to the 2025 Romanian presidential election
Organisation		Type
Origin	Name	Type
List	Association of World Election Bodies	International organisation
Canada	Élections Québec	Election commission
Switzerland	Swiss Democracy Foundation	Stiftung
United States	Federal Election Commission	Election commission
Estonia	State Electoral Office	Election commission
Lithuania	Central Electoral Commission	Election commission
Malta	Electoral Commission of Malta	Election commission
Mexico	Instituto Nacional Electoral	Election commission
Moldova	Central Electoral Commission	Election commission
Bosnia & Herzegovina	Central Election Commission	Election commission
Turkey	Supreme Election Council	Election commission
South Africa	Independent Electoral Commission	Election commission
Philippines	Commission on Elections	Election commission
Hungary	National Election Office	Election commission
Albania	Central Election Commission	Election commission
Ukraine	Central Election Commission	Election commission
Tunisia	Independent High Authority for Elections	Election commission
Kazakhstan	Central Election Commission	Election commission
India	Election Commission of India	Election commission
Taiwan	Central Election Commission	Election commission
OSCE	Office for Democratic Institutions and Human Rights	International organisation
OSCE	Parliamentary Assembly of the OSCE	International organisation
United States	Embassy of the United States in Romania	Diplomatic mission
United Kingdom	Embassy of the United Kingdom in Romania	Diplomatic mission
Canada	Embassy of Canada in Romania	Diplomatic mission
Sweden	Embassy of Sweden in Romania	Diplomatic mission
Norway	Embassy of Norway in Romania	Diplomatic mission
Hungary	Embassy of Hungary in Romania	Diplomatic mission
Turkey	Embassy of Turkey in Romania	Diplomatic mission
Kazakhstan	Embassy of Kazakhstan in Romania	Diplomatic mission
France	Embassy of France in Romania	Diplomatic mission
Moldova	Promo-LEX	Nonprofit NGO
Source: Permanent Electoral Authority

Results were updated in real time on the Permanent Electoral Authority website with information from the 19,943 polling stations. There were no major incidents reported by observers during voting hours or the counting process. Statements of preliminary conclusions from the Parliamentary Assembly of the OSCE mention that "[t]he voting process was evaluated positively, with observers finding the process to be conducted in an efficient, transparent, and professional manner", while also noting the presence of online disinformation and media bias during the campaign. FEC member Trey Trainor praised the election process he observed, stating that: "Every vote was cast using a paper ballot, and the entire ballot-counting process was not only done in the presence of poll watchers from every political party but also recorded on video to guarantee transparency. There were no delays in reporting results. In fact, the entire country completed its electoral count within hours of polls closing — a testament to both the simplicity and the integrity of the process."

== Results ==
Candidate	Party	First round		Second round	
Candidate	Party	Votes	%	Votes	%
Nicușor Dan	Independent	1,979,767	20.99	6,168,642	53.60
George Simion	Alliance for the Union of Romanians	3,862,761	40.96	5,339,053	46.40
Crin Antonescu	Romania Forward Electoral Alliance (Note: Also endorsed by ethnic minority parties)	1,892,930	20.07		
Victor Ponta	Independent	1,230,164	13.04		
Elena Lasconi	Save Romania Union	252,721	2.68		
Lavinia Șandru	Social Liberal Humanist Party	60,682	0.64		
Daniel Funeriu	Independent	49,604	0.53		
Cristian Terheș	Romanian National Conservative Party	36,445	0.39		
Sebastian Popescu	New Romania Party	25,994	0.28		
John Ion Banu	Independent	22,020	0.23		
Silviu Predoiu	National Action League Party	17,186	0.18		
Total		9,430,274	100.00	11,507,695	100.00
Valid votes		9,430,274	98.52	11,507,695	98.85
Invalid/blank votes		141,466	1.48	134,171	1.15
Total votes		9,571,740	100.00	11,641,866	100.00
Registered voters/turnout		17,988,031	53.21	17,988,218	64.72
Source: Permanent Electoral Authority

Vote share
Second round
Dan	53.60%
Simion	46.40%
First round
Simion	40.96%
Dan	20.99%
Antonescu	20.07%
Ponta	13.04%
Lasconi	2.68%
Others	2.26%

=== First round ===
==== By county ====
Results by county
County	George Simion		Nicușor Dan		Crin Antonescu		Victor Ponta		Elena Lasconi		Lavinia Șandru		Daniel Funeriu		Cristian Terheș		Sebastian Popescu		John Ion Banu		Silviu Predoiu	
County	Votes	%	Votes	%	Votes	%	Votes	%	Votes	%	Votes	%	Votes	%	Votes	%	Votes	%	Votes	%	Votes	%
Alba	65,369	43.45%	26,138	17.38%	32,276	21.46%	19,137	12.72%	3,613	2.40%	1,118	0.74%	889	0.59%	755	0.50%	485	0.32%	389	0.26%	265	0.18%
Arad	79,460	46.66%	27,131	15.93%	33,219	19.51%	21,272	12.49%	4,333	2.54%	1,057	0.62%	1,495	0.88%	1,146	0.67%	479	0.28%	394	0.28%	309	0.23%
Argeș	118,704	43.32%	39,025	14.24%	48,449	17.68%	51,774	18.89%	10,587	3.86%	1,657	0.60%	1,192	0.43%	766	0.28%	619	0.23%	853	0.31%	406	0.15%
Bacău	106,495	44.52%	38,131	15.94%	45,019	18.82%	34,559	14.45%	8,096	3.38%	2,322	0.97%	1,537	0.64%	912	0.38%	879	0.37%	680	0.28%	554	0.23%
Bihor	74,768	31.62%	33,191	14.04%	89,273	37.76%	28,311	11.97%	4,908	2.08%	1,246	0.53%	1,190	0.50%	1,648	0.70%	949	0.40%	498	0.21%	453	0.19%
Bistrița-Năsăud	49,225	44.39%	17,336	15.63%	23,152	20.88%	16,215	14.62%	2,338	2.11%	791	0.71%	553	0.50%	566	0.51%	327	0.29%	241	0.22%	146	0.13%
Botoșani	63,780	45.68%	16,203	11.61%	25,441	18.22%	27,428	19.65%	3,202	2.29%	1,131	0.81%	722	0.52%	570	0.41%	537	0.38%	314	0.22%	281	0.20%
Brașov	89,147	33.39%	83,162	31.15%	45,264	16.95%	33,431	12.52%	8,693	3.26%	2,068	0.77%	1,780	0.67%	1,387	0.52%	746	0.28%	785	0.29%	550	0.21%
Brăila	55,204	45.26%	16,412	13.46%	22,007	18.04%	22,476	18.43%	2,638	2.16%	1,059	0.87%	708	0.58%	438	0.36%	431	0.35%	316	0.26%	277	0.23%
Buzău	73,502	41.18%	23,797	13.33%	40,088	22.46%	33,149	18.57%	3,783	2.12%	1,372	0.77%	873	0.49%	522	0.29%	572	0.32%	425	0.24%	392	0.22%
Caraș-Severin	49,643	46.35%	12,172	11.36%	22,575	21.08%	17,824	16.64%	2,444	2.28%	647	0.60%	575	0.54%	486	0.45%	298	0.28%	263	0.25%	177	0.17%
Călărași	56,015	47.90%	12,790	10.94%	26,979	23.07%	16,347	13.98%	2,303	1.97%	761	0.65%	503	0.43%	294	0.25%	445	0.38%	259	0.22%	246	0.21%
Cluj	95,088	27.88%	121,072	35.49%	72,039	21.12%	34,406	10.09%	9,926	2.91%	2,092	0.61%	2,162	0.63%	2,178	0.64%	842	0.25%	820	0.24%	495	0.15%
Constanța	138,867	44.29%	69,892	22.29%	47,692	15.21%	39,589	12.63%	9,333	2.98%	2,547	0.81%	2,008	0.64%	1,055	0.34%	973	0.31%	902	0.29%	666	0.21%
Covasna	10,885	16.16%	7,238	10.74%	41,683	61.87%	4,747	7.05%	1,270	1.88%	294	0.44%	254	0.38%	363	0.54%	309	0.46%	184	0.27%	149	0.22%
Dâmbovița	94,562	46.03%	30,065	14.63%	33,617	16.36%	37,623	18.31%	5,072	2.47%	1,386	0.67%	1,008	0.49%	604	0.29%	644	0.31%	428	0.21%	427	0.21%
Dolj	106,379	39.36%	38,908	14.40%	72,468	26.81%	42,217	15.62%	5,366	1.99%	1,480	0.55%	1,109	0.41%	646	0.24%	728	0.27%	477	0.18%	494	0.18%
Galați	88,679	41.55%	37,976	17.80%	40,736	19.09%	34,383	16.11%	5,723	2.68%	1,904	0.89%	1,391	0.65%	802	0.38%	682	0.32%	659	0.31%	469	0.22%
Giurgiu	51,953	41.75%	11,561	9.29%	39,262	31.55%	17,031	13.69%	2,190	1.76%	763	0.61%	414	0.33%	278	0.22%	474	0.38%	226	0.18%	295	0.24%
Gorj	71,744	49.54%	14,338	9.90%	22,930	15.83%	30,925	21.35%	2,507	1.73%	840	0.58%	487	0.34%	290	0.20%	315	0.22%	238	0.16%	215	0.15%
Harghita	9,693	8.96%	8,573	7.92%	80,764	74.62%	5,224	4.83%	1,733	1.60%	362	0.33%	355	0.33%	468	0.43%	530	0.49%	279	0.26%	256	0.24%
Hunedoara	75,213	44.15%	23,460	13.77%	31,093	18.25%	30,804	18.08%	5,397	3.17%	1,312	0.77%	1,080	0.63%	839	0.49%	443	0.26%	434	0.25%	279	0.16%
Ialomița	45,928	47.23%	12,558	12.91%	18,271	18.79%	16,268	16.73%	2,152	2.21%	702	0.72%	473	0.49%	242	0.25%	272	0.28%	204	0.21%	175	0.18%
Iași	122,412	36.18%	96,467	28.51%	54,692	16.16%	46,474	13.73%	9,696	2.87%	2,497	0.74%	2,087	0.62%	1,276	0.38%	1,114	0.33%	814	0.24%	853	0.25%
Ilfov	104,985	36.12%	80,871	27.82%	59,981	20.64%	30,703	10.56%	8,016	2.76%	1,741	0.60%	1,464	0.50%	781	0.27%	741	0.25%	704	0.24%	658	0.23%
Maramureș	73,152	43.40%	30,923	18.35%	31,935	18.95%	23,827	14.14%	4,610	2.74%	1,209	0.72%	872	0.52%	956	0.57%	459	0.27%	343	0.20%	262	0.16%
Mehedinți	46,099	41.38%	7,878	7.07%	34,312	30.80%	19,220	17.25%	2,031	1.82%	575	0.52%	400	0.36%	233	0.21%	310	0.28%	178	0.16%	167	0.15%
Mureș	64,861	31.93%	35,853	17.65%	71,383	35.14%	21,803	10.73%	4,699	2.31%	1,265	0.62%	930	0.46%	852	0.42%	634	0.31%	485	0.24%	351	0.17%
Neamț	86,293	45.41%	30,479	16.04%	31,800	16.73%	30,502	16.05%	5,539	2.91%	1,801	0.95%	1,147	0.60%	668	0.35%	747	0.39%	635	0.33%	425	0.22%
Olt	80,024	44.30%	15,790	8.74%	46,844	25.93%	31,080	17.20%	3,600	1.99%	1,259	0.70%	631	0.35%	368	0.20%	477	0.26%	281	0.16%	295	0.16%
Prahova	134,799	41.68%	65,224	20.17%	53,232	16.46%	52,266	16.16%	9,510	2.94%	2,780	0.86%	1,850	0.57%	1,120	0.35%	1,000	0.31%	958	0.30%	688	0.21%
Satu Mare	37,568	33.89%	13,724	12.38%	42,231	38.09%	12,255	11.05%	2,804	2.53%	496	0.45%	435	0.39%	524	0.47%	399	0.36%	224	0.20%	208	0.19%
Sălaj	31,422	34.21%	13,028	14.18%	30,703	33.43%	11,933	12.99%	2,298	2.50%	480	0.52%	409	0.45%	956	1.04%	308	0.34%	152	0.17%	155	0.17%
Sibiu	70,877	39.34%	51,737	28.72%	30,856	17.13%	16,684	9.26%	5,387	2.99%	1,272	0.71%	1,108	0.61%	916	0.51%	467	0.26%	564	0.31%	298	0.17%
Suceava	124,671	48.55%	36,556	14.24%	43,741	17.03%	40,464	15.76%	5,040	1.96%	1,944	0.76%	1,397	0.54%	1,217	0.47%	744	0.29%	610	0.24%	399	0.16%
Teleorman	57,099	40.71%	12,062	8.60%	41,408	29.52%	24,439	17.42%	2,547	1.82%	856	0.61%	528	0.38%	366	0.26%	475	0.34%	245	0.17%	237	0.17%
Timiș	116,399	37.99%	87,880	28.68%	49,726	16.23%	33,168	10.83%	11,030	3.60%	2,035	0.66%	2,466	0.80%	1,757	0.57%	684	0.22%	776	0.25%	458	0.15%
Tulcea	42,864	51.19%	12,349	14.75%	13,562	16.20%	10,985	13.12%	1,977	2.36%	648	0.77%	476	0.57%	235	0.28%	250	0.30%	205	0.24%	176	0.21%
Vaslui	60,879	44.45%	18,311	13.37%	26,087	19.05%	23,927	17.47%	4,064	2.97%	1,263	0.92%	733	0.54%	485	0.35%	542	0.40%	322	0.24%	358	0.26%
Vâlcea	68,906	44.39%	21,173	13.64%	29,430	18.96%	29,338	18.90%	3,125	2.01%	1,164	0.75%	744	0.48%	388	0.25%	416	0.27%	338	0.22%	224	0.14%
Vrancea	61,135	44.76%	19,448	14.24%	27,531	20.15%	22,045	16.14%	3,222	2.36%	963	0.70%	772	0.57%	427	0.31%	462	0.34%	288	0.21%	306	0.22%
Bucharest	220,823	24.80%	361,497	40.59%	153,909	17.28%	110,723	12.43%	24,411	2.74%	5,176	0.58%	5,156	0.58%	2,709	0.30%	1,627	0.18%	2,621	0.29%	1,942	0.22%
Diaspora	587,190	60.79%	247,388	25.61%	65,270	6.76%	23,188	2.40%	31,508	3.26%	2,347	0.24%	3,241	0.34%	2,956	0.31%	1,159	0.12%	1,009	0.10%	750	0.08%
Total	3,862,761	40.96%	1,979,767	20.99%	1,892,930	20.07%	1,230,164	13.04%	252,721	2.68%	60,682	0.64%	49,604	0.53%	36,445	0.39%	25,994	0.28%	22,020	0.23%	17,186	0.18%

==== Maps ====
First round
George Simion	Nicușor Dan
Crin Antonescu	Victor Ponta

==== Voter demographics ====
Sociology of the electorate
Demographic	George Simion	Nicușor Dan	Crin Antonescu	Victor Ponta	Others
Sex
Men	41.6%	18.8%	22.8%	13.5%	3.3%
Women	36.9%	22.0%	21.9%	14.2%	4.9%
Age
18–30	43.6%	34.3%	11.9%	4.8%	5.5%
31–60	42.9%	20.9%	21.4%	10.1%	4.6%
61 or older	29.8%	10.9%	30.5%	26.6%	2.2%
Education
Primary education	48.0%	6.7%	24.3%	17.8%	3.2%
Secondary education	44.2%	15.8%	21.5%	14.3%	4.3%
Higher education	24.8%	38.5%	22.1%	10.1%	4.5%
Settlement type
Urban	34.4%	27.4%	19.4%	13.9%	4.8%
Rural	44.5%	12.9%	25.5%	13.8%	3.3%
Political party (2024 Romanian parliamentary election)
PSD	12.2%	6.6%	39.1%	40.6%	1.5%
AUR	94.3%	2.0%	1.2%	1.6%	0.8%
PNL	10.4%	20.2%	58.6%	8.4%	2.4%
USR	7.5%	68.0%	5.3%	3.3%	15.9%
SOS	59.4%	14.0%	6.8%	11.5%	8.3%
POT	52.2%	22.7%	5.2%	13.1%	6.7%
UDMR	5.0%	9.0%	78.3%	4.3%	3.3%
Other / Independents	23.0%	47.1%	3.6%	21.3%	5.0%
Total
Total vote (exit poll)	38.7%	20.5%	21.6%	14.3%	5.0%
Total vote (actual)	40.96%	20.99%	20.07%	13.04%	4.94%
Source: CURS exit poll

=== Second round ===
==== By county ====
Results by county
County	Nicușor Dan		George Simion	
County	Votes	%	Votes	%
Alba	90,248	51.70%	84,307	48.30%
Arad	96,744	47.74%	105,901	52.26%
Argeș	144,461	47.06%	162,489	52.94%
Bacău	132,761	48.87%	138,900	51.13%
Bihor	182,029	63.64%	103,995	36.36%
Bistrița-Năsăud	65,653	49.64%	66,610	50.36%
Botoșani	73,170	45.61%	87,243	54.39%
Brăila	62,978	45.64%	75,009	54.36%
Brașov	199,023	62.69%	118,474	37.31%
Buzău	99,466	49.58%	101,161	50.42%
Călărași	55,059	41.88%	76,416	58.12%
Caraș-Severin	48,785	42.41%	66,237	57.59%
Cluj	298,313	70.16%	126,885	29.84%
Constanța	180,853	50.47%	177,458	49.53%
Covasna	85,153	84.42%	15,721	15.58%
Dâmbovița	107,476	45.70%	127,676	54.30%
Dolj	149,161	51.01%	143,278	48.99%
Galați	126,042	51.96%	116,516	48.04%
Giurgiu	59,717	43.99%	76,035	56.01%
Gorj	59,804	38.52%	95,439	61.48%
Harghita	142,248	90.78%	14,439	9.22%
Hunedoara	87,301	46.43%	100,733	53.57%
Ialomița	49,924	44.43%	62,448	55.57%
Iași	232,461	58.75%	163,233	41.25%
Ilfov	197,499	56.96%	149,226	43.04%
Maramureș	102,658	51.21%	97,812	48.79%
Mehedinți	50,656	44.00%	64,463	56.00%
Mureș	172,218	67.02%	84,764	32.98%
Neamț	102,270	47.53%	112,895	52.47%
Olt	80,832	43.00%	107,130	57.00%
Prahova	196,928	52.24%	180,022	47.76%
Sălaj	67,460	62.19%	41,016	37.81%
Satu Mare	89,328	63.51%	51,327	36.49%
Sibiu	126,977	58.55%	89,905	41.45%
Suceava	123,695	42.37%	168,234	57.63%
Teleorman	69,572	46.48%	80,095	53.52%
Timiș	216,694	58.37%	154,517	41.63%
Tulcea	40,054	41.67%	56,058	58.33%
Vâlcea	81,224	46.32%	94,114	53.68%
Vaslui	76,977	48.68%	81,139	51.32%
Vrancea	71,889	47.18%	80,476	52.82%
Bucharest	749,291	69.65%	326,451	30.35%
Diaspora	723,590	44.22%	912,806	55.78%
Total	6,168,642	53.60%	5,339,053	46.40%

==== Voter demographics ====
Sociology of the electorate
Demographic	Nicușor Dan	George Simion
Sex
Men	51.2%	48.8%
Women	59.4%	40.6%
Age
18–30	58.4%	41.6%
31–60	52.5%	47.5%
61 or older	58.6%	41.4%
Education
Primary education	37.5%	62.5%
Secondary education	51%	49%
Higher education	74.5%	25.5%
Settlement type
Urban	61.8%	38.2%
Rural	48.1%	51.9%
First-round presidential candidate
George Simion	3.4%	96.6%
Nicușor Dan	97.6%	2.4%
Crin Antonescu	83.5%	16.5%
Victor Ponta	62%	38%
Elena Lasconi	81.2%	18.8%
Other / Independents	75.2%	24.8%
Total
Total vote (exit poll)	55.2%	44.8%
Total vote (actual)	53.6%	46.4%

== Aftermath ==
=== First round ===
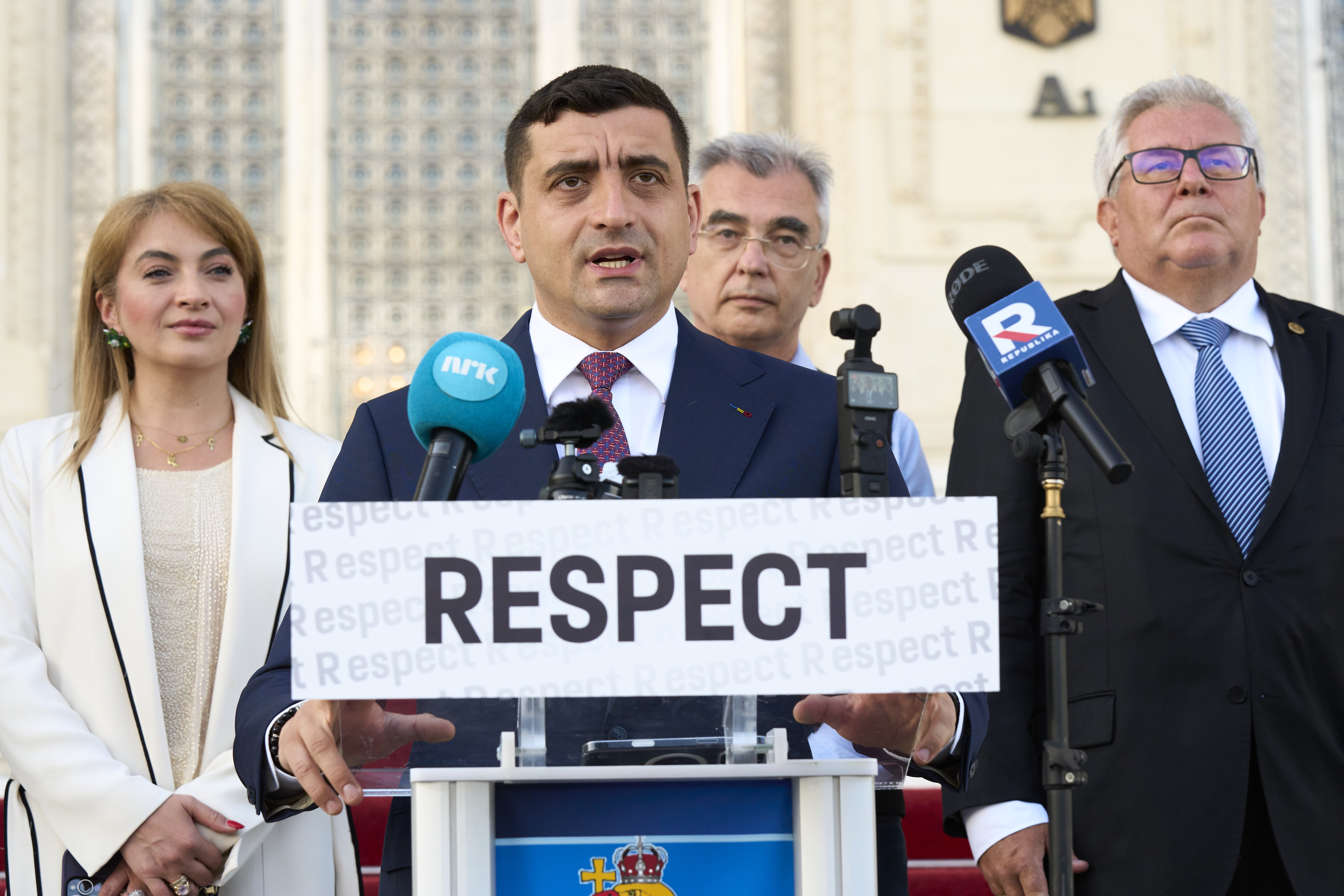
Simion at a press conference on 4 May with Silvia Uscov, Petrișor Peiu and Ryszard Czarnecki

Following the results, Prime Minister Marcel Ciolacu announced that PSD would leave A.Ro, and he resigned from the position of prime minister, which resulted in the collapse of the coalition. However, he continued to serve as the PSD leader. Lasconi got significantly fewer votes than in the 2024 elections, scoring only 2.68% of the vote. Subsequently, the next day after the elections, she announced she would step down as president of the Save Romania Union. Simion's victory in the first round also had significant economic implications, with the Bucharest Stock Exchange experiencing substantial losses, and the National Bank of Romania investing over 2 billion euros in stabilising the leu and preventing depreciation.

Former Romanian president Traian Băsescu criticised the Romanian diaspora for Simion's victory among its voters. He called the attitude of the majority of the diaspora "dishonest", stating that: "They live in the West and say: come on, you who live at home, come on, go to daddy Putin, go to Putin!". During the campaign, AUR appointed lawyer Silvia Uscov head of its legal team to help in possibly challenging the election results. Simion was congratulated on his first-round win by Mateusz Morawiecki, former Polish prime minister and current president of the European Conservatives and Reformists, Italy's Deputy Prime Minister Matteo Salvini and French MEP Marion Maréchal.

==== Analysis ====
After Simion's first-round victory, Moldovan analyst Ion Tăbîrță predicted that, if Simion were to prevail in the second round, Moldova-Romania relations would suffer. Tăbîrță claimed that, were Simion to win, Moldova could lose Romania's support in international relations, including in its path toward European integration. He added that Romania would lose its role as Moldova's "defender" in the eyes of the European Union, as it would no longer have the same image within the bloc. According to another Moldovan analyst, Mihaela Sirețanu, relations between the two countries would become tense: Simion is banned from entering Moldova until 2028. Both Tăbîrță and Sirețanu agreed that Dan's victory would be more favourable for Moldova and its relationship with Romania. BBC's Central Europe Correspondent Nick Thorpe reported that many voters who backed Georgescu in the annulled election switched their allegiance to Simion, and that the two voted together. He predicted that, in the second round, Simion would also attract voters who backed fourth-placed former Prime Minister Victor Ponta, a retired Social Democrat who adopted a "Romania First" campaign.

=== Second round ===
Results of the presidential election

First place diaspora votes in Europe by country: Nicușor Dan George Simion

On the day of the second round, Andrei Țărnea, spokesman of the Ministry of Foreign Affairs of Romania, denounced Russian interference during the election. He stated that a viral fake news campaign on Telegram and other social media was seeking to influence the electoral process, something which was expected as he stated, with the Romanian authorities having proved these news false according to him. The Ministry of Foreign Affairs stated this situation was alarming because "it appears to have been created with the aim of undermining citizens' confidence in democratic institutions and processes". Furthermore, the Ministry of Internal Affairs of Romania stated that a clip had been distributed on TikTok claiming that French troops in Romania, stationed at NATO's Cincu Training Center, were secretly wearing Romanian Gendarmerie uniforms to intervene on Romania's internal affairs, which the ministry stated was false and "pure disinformation".

With a final voter turnout of 64.72% (which translates to 11,641,544 votes), the run-off winner was certified on 18 May by the Central Electoral Bureau to be Dan, with 6,168,642 votes. Simion had prematurely declared victory on Facebook with a post reading: "I won!!! I am the new President of Romania and I am giving back the power to the Romanians!" He later conceded the election, stating "I would like to congratulate my opponent, Nicușor Dan. He won the election, it was the will of the Romanian people". Two days later, Simion demanded the annulment of the election, citing "external influence by state and non-state actors" as grounds for annulment, drawing parallels to the court's previous annulment of the December 2024 election over alleged Russian interference, referring to the election as a "farce".

Telegram founder Pavel Durov claimed meanwhile on May 18 that he had been pressured in France in the spring of 2025 to have Telegram remove certain "conservative" messages during the May 2025 presidential election. The Ministry of Foreign Affairs in France formally denied this in a statement. Following this denial, Durov specifically accused Nicolas Lerner, Director General of External Security (DGSE), of having asked him to carry out this censorship. He did not provide any proof for either of these accusations.

On 21 May, seven out of the 21 deputies and five out of the seven senators of the right-wing populist Party of Young People left the party, bringing the parliamentary group in the Senate below the minimum threshold of members and causing its dissolution. On May 22, the Constitutional Court rejected Simion's request and upheld the initial results, thus validating Dan's election. Dan was sworn in on 26 May in front of the Romanian Parliament. In a statement published on 26 May 2025, the AUR party claimed that Lerner had "discreetly" traveled to Romania before the second round of elections. These fake news were denied by the Romanian Foreign Intelligence Service, calling them "attempts at manipulation and disinformation", and by French DGSE.

==== International reactions ====
Several leaders from across Europe congratulated Dan on his election; they included French president Emmanuel Macron, Ukrainian president Volodymyr Zelenskyy, Moldovan president Maia Sandu, Polish prime minister Donald Tusk, and European Commission president Ursula von der Leyen. Russian presidential spokesperson Dmitry Peskov called the election results "strange, to say the least", and said Dan had won "in the absence of the favorite", referring to Georgescu. The French intelligence agency DGSE denied claims by George Simion and Telegram founder Pavel Durov that it had interfered with the election.

==== Institutions ====
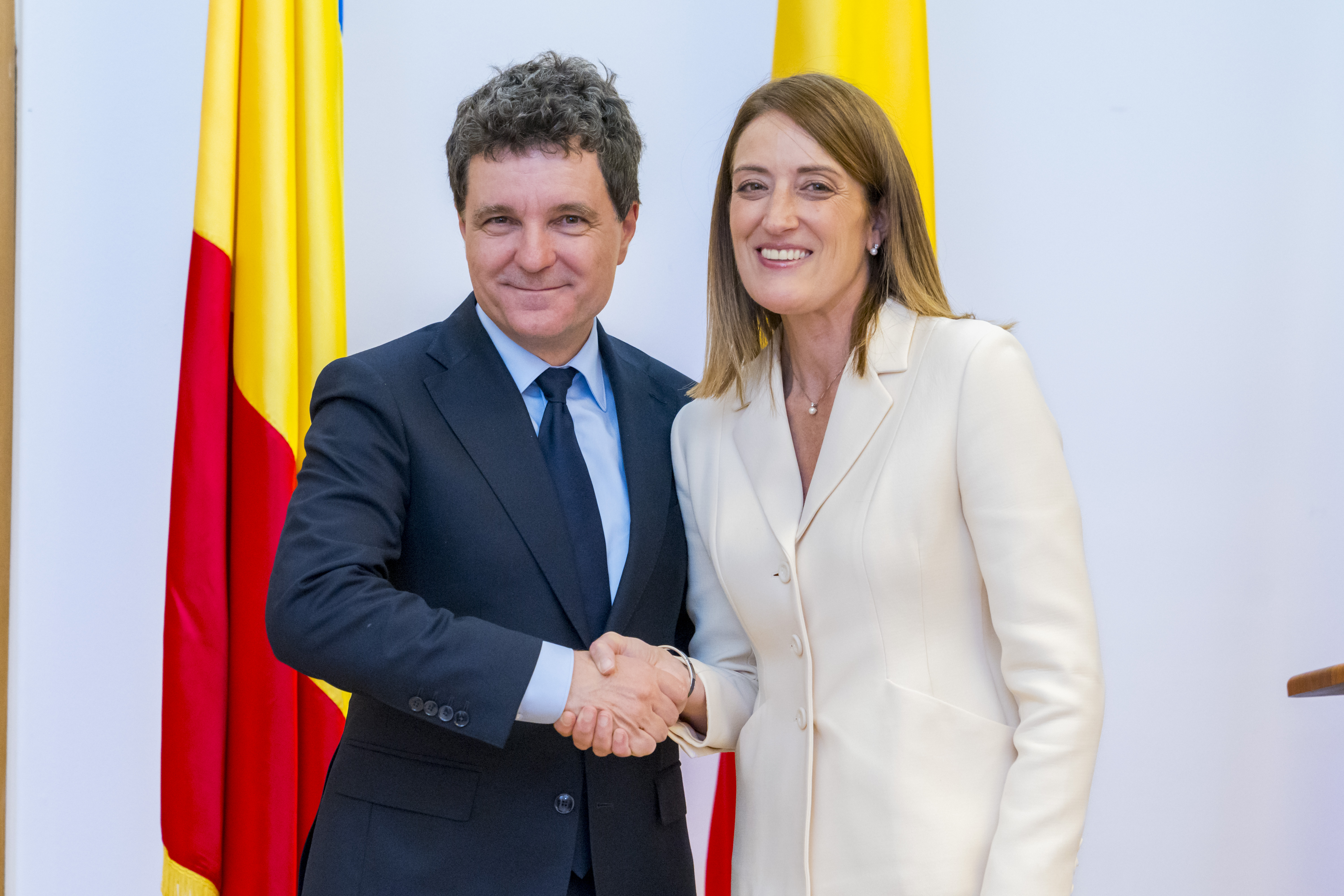
European Parliament President Roberta Metsola visiting Romania and meeting with President Dan

- European Union: President of the European Parliament Roberta Metsola spoke with Dan to congratulate him on his election. She noted that after the announcement of the results, it was deeply moving to see EU flags waved across Romania. Metsola emphasized that the Romanian people could trust and rely on Europe, and she announced that she would visit Romania later that week to deliver this message.
- NATO: Secretary General of NATO Mark Rutte congratulated Dan in a phone call, stressing that both sides shared the important responsibility of ensuring collective security. He underlined that a strong NATO would promote regional stability and expressed his expectation of close cooperation with Dan, particularly at the upcoming NATO Summit in The Hague.

==== Analysis ====
Dan's victory in the second round was unexpected, and analysts attributed it to higher voter turnout. Urban voters, women, and ethnic minorities voted for Dan over Simion by large margins. Dan did particularly well among Romania's large population of ethnic Hungarians, who were wary of Simion's nationalist rhetoric despite Hungarian prime minister Viktor Orbán's apparent endorsement of Simion in the second round. Orbán's endorsement was poorly received in both Hungary and the diaspora. The New York Times columnist Andrew Higgins also opined that Dan's victory indicated that voters "wanted a middle path between bitterly polarized political camps," while the Atlantic Council argued that Dan benefited from not being associated with the ruling government, and that "Romanians have voted for Europe and democracy, not nationalism, but they also seem to want change." Political analyst and AUR senate leader Petrișor Peiu attributed the result to Dan's strong mobilisation efforts as well as "less inspired" decisions by AUR.

== See also ==
- 2024–2025 Romanian election annulment protests
- 2025 elections in the European Union
