= Petrișor =

Petrișor can be both a masculine given name and a surname. Notable people with the name include:

== Given name ==
- Petrișor Peiu, Romanian economist and politician
- Petrișor Petrescu (born 1993), Romanian football midfielder
- Petrișor Toderașc (born 1980), Romanian rugby union football prop
- Petrișor Voinea (born 1990), Romanian football midfielder

== Surname ==
- Alexandru-Ionuț Petrișor, Romanian urban planning and ecology researcher
- Călin Petrișor (born 1998), Romanian kickboxer and kempo practitioner
- Cătălin Petrișor (born 1992), Romanian basketball point guard
