= Petrișor Peiu =

Romanian economist and politician (born 1967)

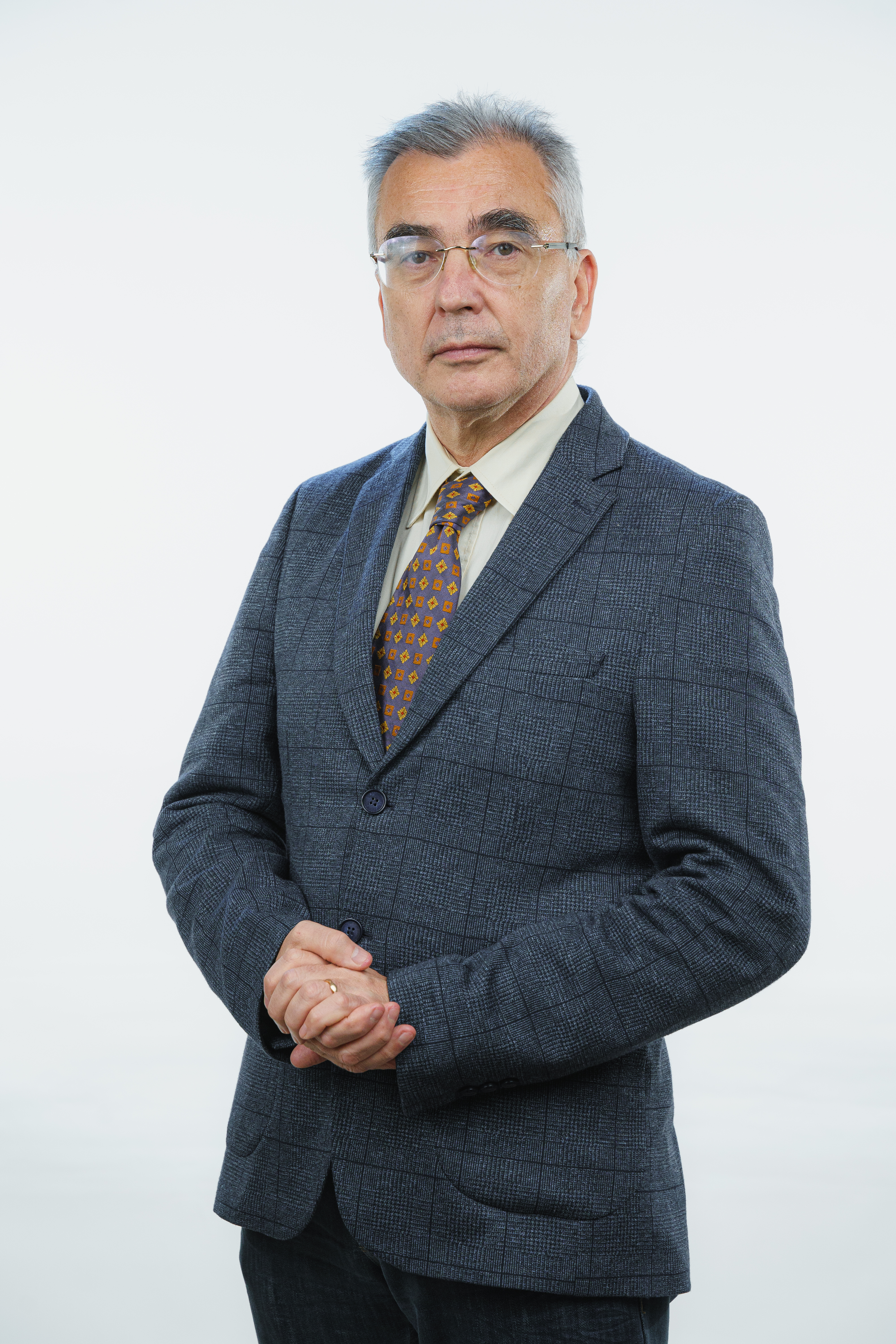
- Peiu in 2024

Member of the Senate of Romania
- Incumbent
- Assumed office 21 December 2024
- Constituency: Bucharest

Personal details
- Born: 29 June 1967 (age 59) Bucharest, Romania
- Party: Alliance for the Union of Romanians
- Education: Politehnica University of Bucharest
- Occupation: Economist, politician
- Petrișor Peiu's voice Peiu at a press conference in Bucharest; Recorded 14 March 2025

Petrișor Gabriel Peiu (Note: Romanian pronunciation: [petriˈʃor ɡabriˈel ˈpeju]) (born 29 June 1967) is a Romanian economist and politician known for his work in the field of economic and industrial development and geopolitical analysis. In 2024, he was elected senator from the Alliance for the Union of Romanians (AUR).

== Early life and education ==
Petrișor-Gabriel Peiu was born on 29 June 1967 in Bucharest, the capital of the Socialist Republic of Romania. He graduated from the Politehnica University of Bucharest, where he obtained a engineer's degree in 1990, and later obtained his engineering doctorate in 1996.

== Professional career ==
In the private sector, he held multiple leadership roles, including president of Sidex Galați (1999–2000), member of the board of directors of Romtelecom (1997–2000), Omniasig (1999–2001) and Electroputere (2004–2005). He also served as a special administrator at Omniasig and Electroputere. Concurrent with his academic activity, Peiu held various positions in the public and private sectors.

From 1998 to 1999, he was an advisor to Romania prime minister Radu Vasile and, from 2001 to 2002, to Adrian Năstase. He also served as Undersecretary of State for Economic Policies from 2002 to 2003 and as vice president of the Foreign Investment Agency from 2003 to 2004.

In 2016, he conducted a study, concluding that the Romanian Orthodox Church was the second largest asset holder in Romania, after the state itself. In April 2018, he criticised the Romanian state for its lack of development, stating "Romania is outside this paradigm, it does not ask itself problems, it does not build scenarios. Of course, from time to time, political leaders appear and say that they oppose a multi-speed Europe, but they do not build anything for it".

In May 2022, the General Secretariat of the Government (SGG) proposed Peiu as a member of the board of directors of Transgaz, monopoly holder of the major gas pipelines in Romania.

== Political career ==
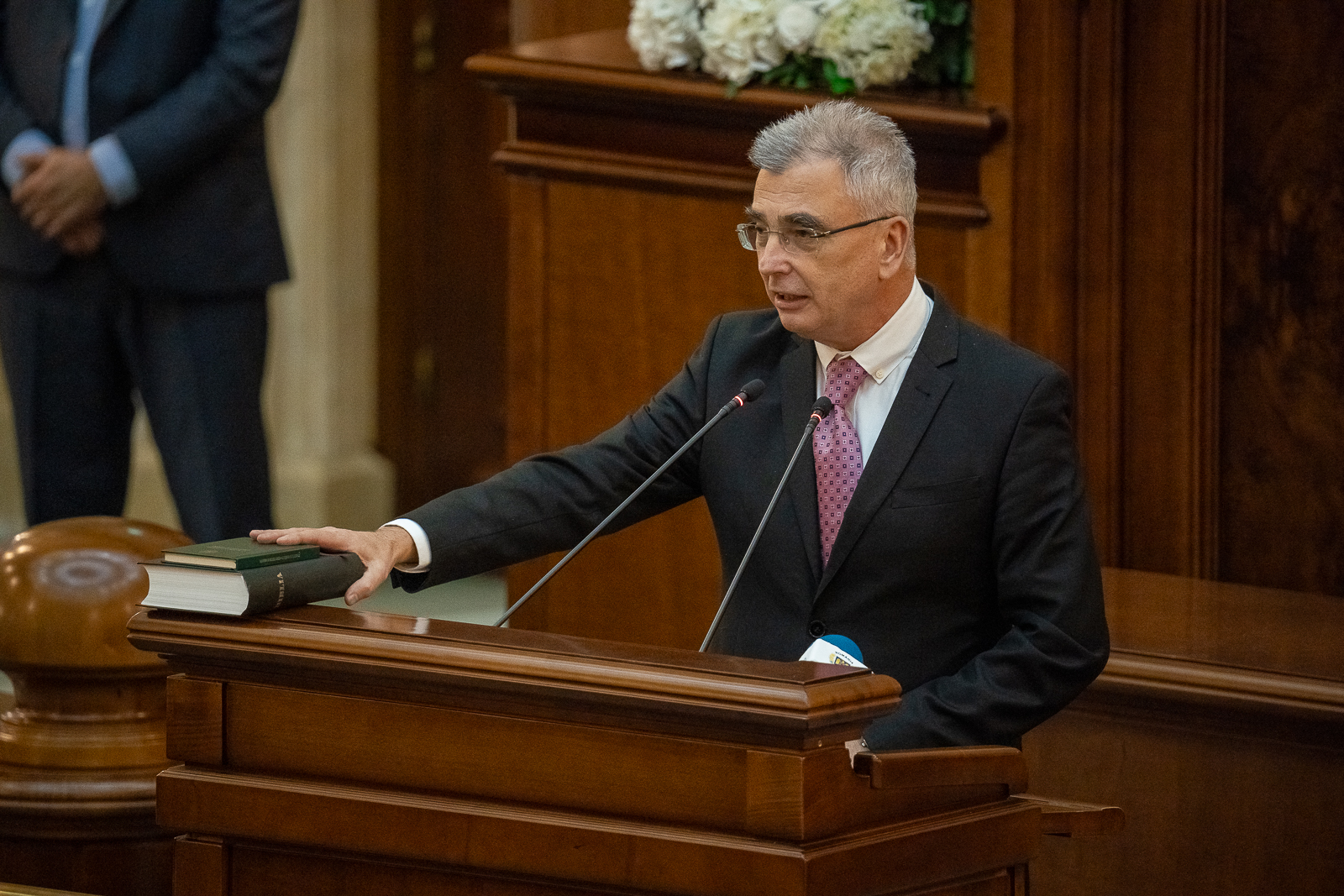
Peiu taking the oath of office in the Senate, 21 December 2024

In 2016, Peiu wrote a message of solidarity with then-activist George Simion: "I too am George Simion because every politician who controls the state of the Republic of Moldova is, in fact, a Vladimir Voronin!", later stating that he had met Simion at seminars and marches promoting to the unification of Moldova with Romania. Throughout his career, Peiu has been an active commentator on economic issues, and in April 2018, he emphasised the importance of modernising Romania.

=== Senator (2024–present) ===
In the 2024 Romanian parliamentary election on 1 December, Peiu was elected a member of the Romanian Senate for the AUR in Bucharest, taking office on 21 December. During that election, Peiu had been the AUR's proposal for prime minister of Romania. Since taking office, Peiu has served as leader of the AUR senate group.

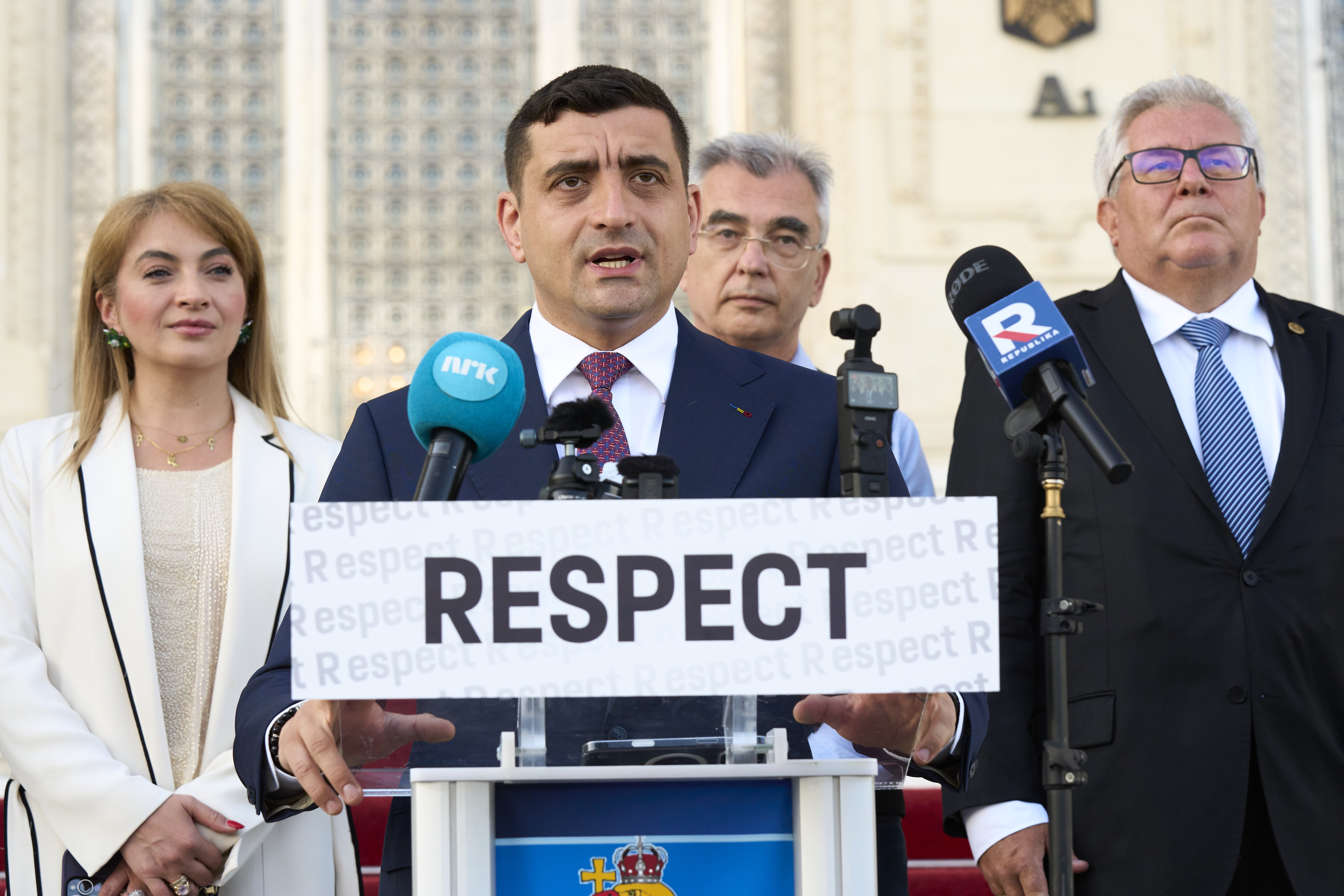
Peiu behind George Simion with Silvia Uscov (left) and Ryszard Czarnecki (right), 4 May 2025

On 8 May 2025, after Simion's victory in the first round of the 2025 presidential elections, Peiu stated that the future government's top priority would be "Reducing the budget deficit through spending cuts is the first and most important emergency; for now, we need to survive, and then we will implement the other measures we are proposing". Simion ultimately lost the runoff on 18 May to Nicușor Dan, which Peiu attributed to Dan's strong mobilisation efforts as well as "less inspired" decisions by the AUR.
