= Alexandru-Ionuț Petrișor =

Romanian academic

- Born: July 6, 1975 (age 51); Romania
- Citizenship: Romanian
- Known for: Urban and landscape ecology research; land-use dynamics; research ethics

Academic background
- Education: University of Bucharest (BSc, PhD); University of South Carolina (MSc, PhD)

Academic work
- Discipline: Urban ecology Landscape ecology Spatial planning
- Institutions: Ion Mincu University of Architecture and Urbanism; Technical University of Moldova; National Institute for Research and Development in Constructions, Urbanism and Sustainable Spatial Development (URBAN-INCERC)

Alexandru-Ionuț Petrișor (born 6 July 1975) is a Romanian academic and researcher specializing in urban and landscape ecology. He is a professor at the Ion Mincu University of Architecture and Urbanism in Bucharest, where he also serves as director of the Doctoral School of Urban Planning. He additionally holds teaching responsibilities as a professor at the Technical University of Moldova in Chișinău and is a researcher at the National Institute for Research and Development in Constructions, Urbanism and Sustainable Spatial Development (URBAN-INCERC) in Bucharest, where he has research and editorial responsibilities.

== Early life and education ==
Petrișor studied ecology at the University of Bucharest, graduating with a bachelor's degree in 1997. He later earned a Master of Science in public health with a specialization in biostatistics from the University of South Carolina in 2000. At the same institution, he completed a PhD in environmental health sciences in 2004. He earned a second doctorate in geography from the University of Bucharest in 2011 and subsequently obtained a postgraduate certificate in European Project Management from the Bucharest University of Economic Studies. In 2014, he obtained his habilitation in urban planning from the Romanian Ministry of Education.

== Academic career ==
Petrișor joined the faculty of the Ion Mincu University of Architecture and Urbanism in 2009 as an assistant professor (lecturer). He was promoted to associate professor in 2016 and to full professor in 2022. In 2015, he co-founded the Doctoral School of Urban Planning at the university, the first doctoral program in Romania dedicated exclusively to this field.

He has also served as a visiting professor in Malaysia and Algeria and has contributed to numerous international conferences and research projects.

== Research ==
Petrișor's research spans urban ecology, landscape dynamics, and spatial planning systems. He has developed a theoretical framework integrating ecological and geographical approaches to urban systems, with a focus on diversity, spatial structure, and dynamics.

A major theme of his work concerns the transitional dynamics of land cover and land use, including the urbanization of coastlines, transformations of urban green spaces, and long-term land-use drivers in Eastern Europe.

He has also contributed quantitative methodologies for urban and environmental research, applying statistical and computational techniques to assess sustainability and quality of life in cities.

Petrișor is known for his work on predatory publishing and academic ethics. In 2017, he published an analysis of evolving strategies used by predatory journals, and in 2021 authored an essay examining plagiarism and ethical misconduct in academia.

== Selected publications ==
- Petrișor, A. I. (2022). "Mechanisms of Change in Urban Green Infrastructure—Evidence from Romania and Poland". Land. 11 (5). doi:10.3390/land11050592.
- Petrișor, A. I. (2020). "Degradation of coastlines under the pressure of urbanization and tourism: Evidence on the change of land systems from Europe, Asia and Africa". Land. 9 (8). doi:10.3390/land9080275.
- Petrișor, A. I. (2021). "Dynamics of Open Green Areas in Polish and Romanian Cities during 2006–2018: Insights for Spatial Planners". Remote Sensing. 13 (20). doi:10.3390/rs13204041.
- Petrișor, A. I. (2020). "Exploring the Urban Strength of Small Towns in Romania". Social Indicators Research. 152 (3). doi:10.1007/s11205-020-02465-x.
- Petrișor, A. I. (2017). "Evolving strategies of the predatory journals". Malaysian Journal of Library and Information Science. 21 (1). doi:10.22452/mjlis.vol21no1.1.
- Petrișor, A. I. (2021). "Predation, Plagiarism, and Perfidy". Portal: Libraries and the Academy. 21 (2). doi:10.1353/pla.2021.0037.

== Awards and honors ==
- Urban Concept Diplomas (2009, 2014) awarded at Romanian national conferences on urban development
- Inclusion in biographical directories such as Dictionary of Contemporary Romanian Inventors, Empire Who’s Who, and Marquis Who’s Who (2004–2008)
- Institutional recognition for publishing in Q1 and Q2 journals (2014–2023)
