= Ballot order effect =

Effect of voting behavior based on ballot order

The ballot order effect refers to the effect of voting behavior based on the placement of candidates' names on an election ballot. Candidates who are listed first often receive a small but statistically significant increase in votes compared to those listed in lower positions. This effect is typically more noticeable in nonpartisan or low information elections.

== Overview ==
Most electoral systems order candidates for various offices in a specific order. This can include ordering candidates alphabetically, incumbency, randomly, or by political party. The order of candidate name placement on a ballot can subtly sway results the outcome of the election by leveraging cognitive shortcuts in decision making. One possible explanation for this draws on the primacy effect, a psychological principle suggesting that individuals are more likely to remember items or candidates listed first. Another possible explanation is the limited information hypothesis. It suggests that when voters don't have significant amounts of information about the election or the candidates running in the election, they may default to other sources of information including race, gender, and order on the ballot.

== See also ==
- Donkey vote
- 'Butterfly ballot' in the 2000 U.S presidential election
