= Ryszard Czarnecki =

Polish politician

Ryszard Czarnecki MEP
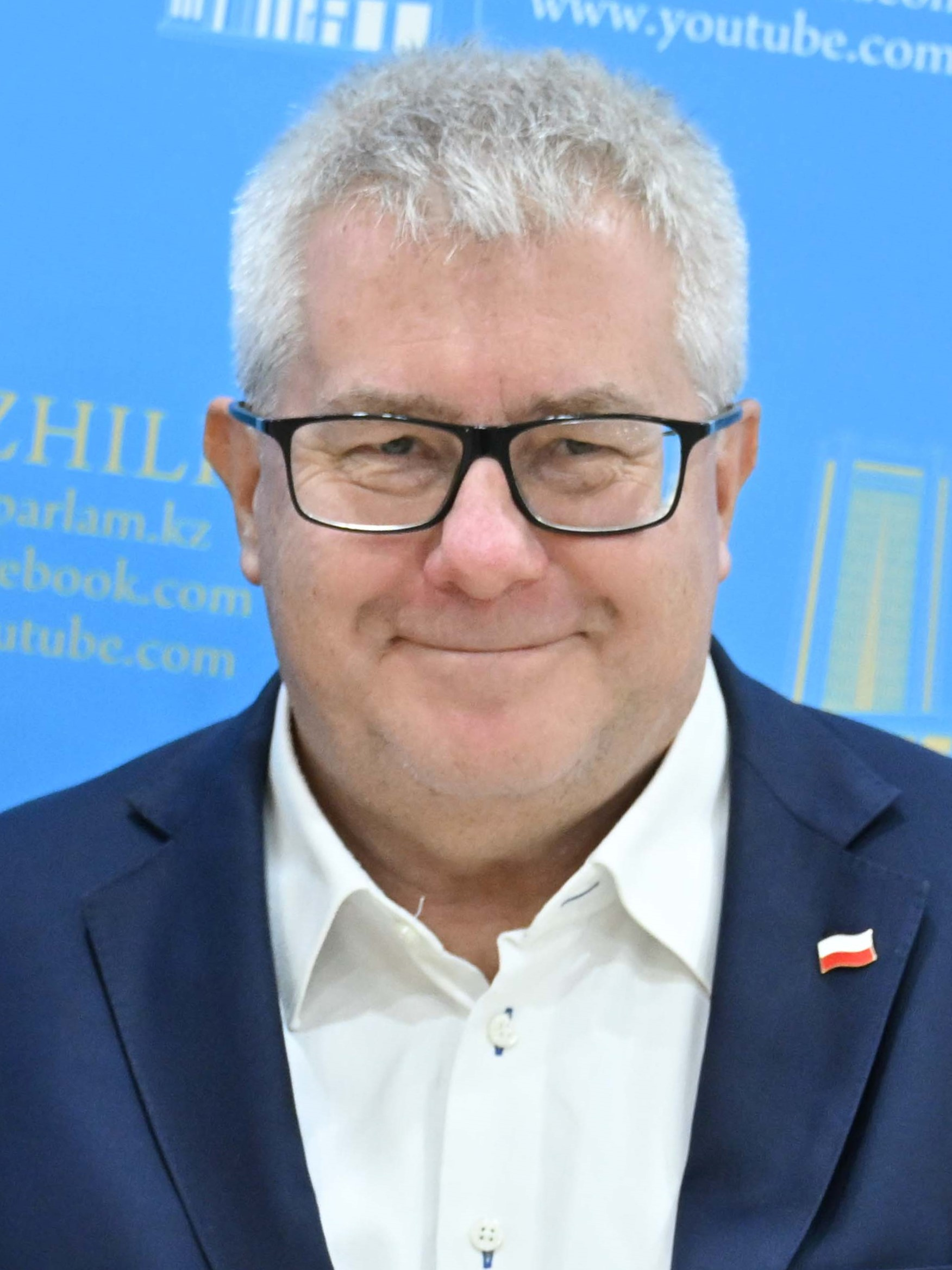
- Czarnecki in 2023

Member of the European Parliament
- In office 1 July 2004 – 15 July 2024
- Constituency: Lower Silesian and Opole

Member of the Sejm
- In office 10 April 1997 – 25 July 2004
- In office 25 November 1991 – 31 May 1993

Minister for European Integration
- In office 27 July 1998 – 26 March 1999
- Prime Minister: Jerzy Buzek
- Preceded by: Jan Krzysztof Bielecki (1993)
- Succeeded by: Lech Nikolski (2003)

Personal details
- Born: Richard Henry Czarnecki; 25 January 1963 (age 63) London, United Kingdom
- Party: Poland: Law and Justice (2008–present); Christian National Union (1989–2004); Self-Defence (2004–2008); EU: European Conservatives and Reformists
- Spouse: Emilia Czarnecka
- Children: 3
- Education: University of Wrocław
- Awards: Order of Merit (Ukraine)
- Website: www.ryszardczarnecki.pl

Ryszard Henryk Czarnecki (born 25 January 1963 as Richard Henry Czarnecki) is a Polish politician and a former Member of the European Parliament (MEP) from Poland. He is a member of the Law and Justice, part of the European Conservatives and Reformists.

Prior to 2008, he was a member of the Self-Defense party.

He was part of the European Parliament Committee on Foreign Affairs, and a substitute for the Committee on Constitutional Affairs and a member of the Delegation for relations with the countries of south-east Europe. Former member of the "Group on South Asia", "South Asia Peace Forum" and "Forum for Balochistan" in the European Parliament.

== Education ==
- Master of History, University of Wrocław
- 1987: Archivist, Archiwum Akt Nowych, Warsaw (1986) 'Solidarność' Archives

== Career ==
- 1988–1990: journalist with 'The Polish Daily', London
- editorial secretary
- 1991: Deputy editor-in-chief 'Wiadomości Dnia'
- 1991: editor-in-chief 'Dziennik Dolnośląski' (1991), acting director 'NORPOL-PRESS'
- 1993–1997: Chief Editor for Religious programmes, Polsat TV
- 2001–2004: Lecturer
- 1994–1996: Chairman of the Christian-National Union (ZCHN)
- 2002–2004: Expert 'Self-defence of the Polish Republic'
- Member in the I and III terms of the Parliament of the Republic of Poland
- Vice-Chairman of the Parliamentary Committee on Culture and Media
- Chairman of the Parliamentary Sub-committee on Copyright
- Chairman of the Polish-Italian Parliamentary Group
- 1991–1993: parliamentary representative to the North Atlantic Treaty Organization
- Member of the Parliamentary Committee on European Integration
- 1999–2001: Chairman of the Parliamentary Committee on Liaison with Poles Abroad
- 2000–2001: Vice-Chairman of the Committee on European Law
- 1991–2001: representative of the Polish Sejm (parliament) in the Parliamentary Assembly of the West European Union
- 1993: Deputy Minister of Culture
- 1997–1999: Minister for European Integration
- 1997–1998: Head of the Committee on European Integration
- 1998–1999: Minister – member of the Cabinet

In 2009 European Parliament election he is a candidate of Law and Justice from Kuyavian-Pomeranian constituency.

== Confrontations with Róża Thun ==
=== Statement on Róża Thun's full name ===
On 26 April 2009 – less than two months before the European elections – Czarnecki wrote a blog entry, describing the "troubles" of Róża Thun, a Polish politician and an Austrian Countess-consort, with the Polish National Electoral Commission. According to Czarnecki, the Civic Platform intended to register her candidacy under the name of Róża Thun, but the Commission refused, stating that according to the regulations, all candidates must appear under their full names on the ballot papers. "And so, the voters will see Róża Maria Gräfin von Thun und Hohenstein in her full grace", Czarnecki wrote. He further asserted that "a Gräfin with a German-sounding name might do harm to the Civic Platform".

On 20 May 2009, it was revealed that Czarnecki himself would appear on the ballot sheets not under his assumed Polish name of Ryszard Henryk, but as Richard Henry, since he was born in the United Kingdom. Czarnecki stated that his situation is different, as he didn't choose his names, while Thun chose her surname by marrying her husband. Countess Thun retorted her name came out of love, adding "I pity Richard Henry Czarnecki".

=== Dismissal from vice-presidency of the European Parliament ===
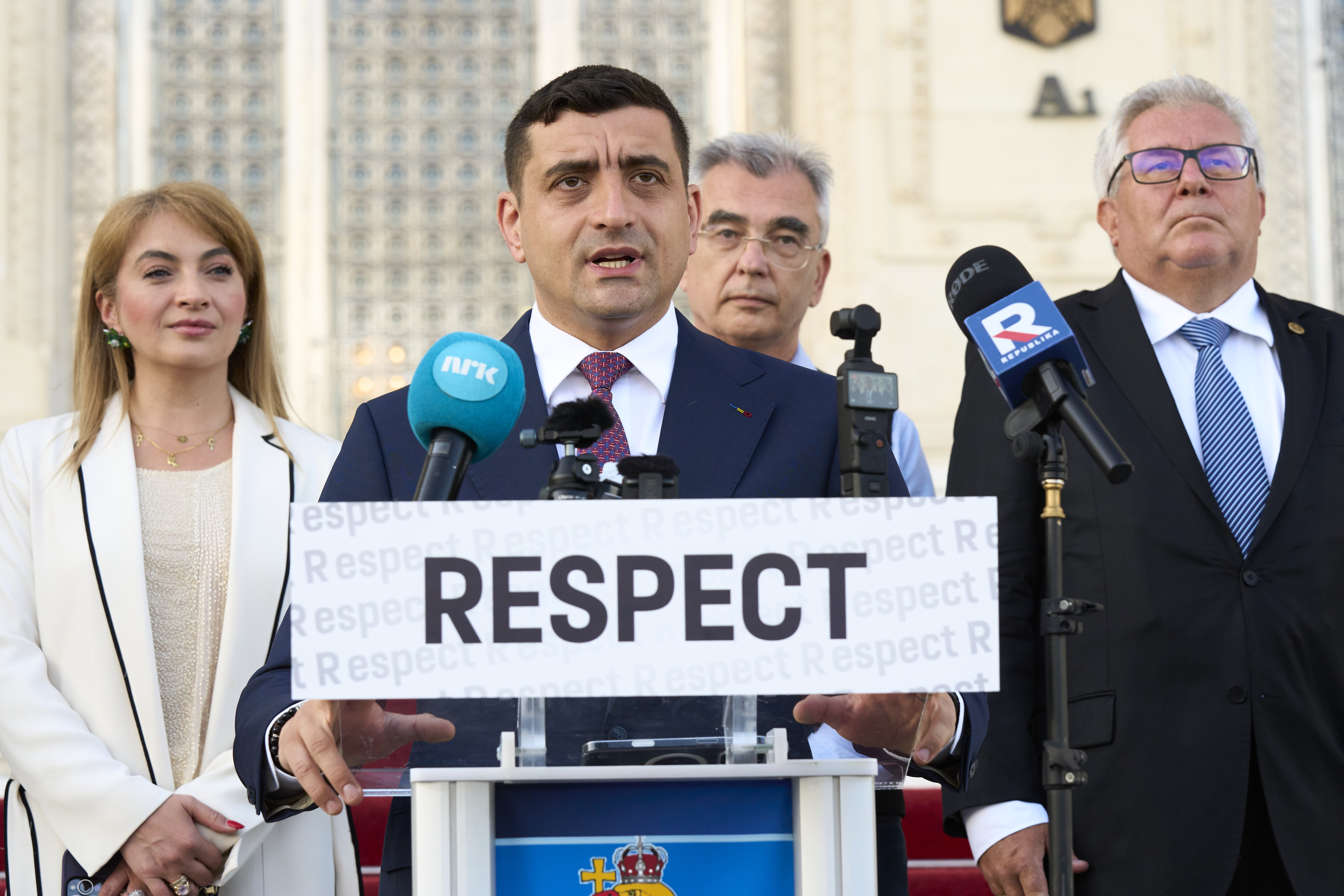
Czarnecki with Petrișor Peiu,George Simion and Silvia Uscov in Bucharest, 4 May 2025

In an interview published on 3 January 2018 in a Polish right-wing portal, Ryszard Czarnecki compared Róża Thun to Nazi collaborators, specifically people called szmalcownik. Consequently, at the request of the leaders of four European Parliament factions, on 7 February 2018 by secret ballot he was dismissed from the post of vice-president of the European Parliament for "serious breaches" of the Parliament's Rules (447 MEPs voted for his dismissal, 196 against, and 30 abstained). This was the first time in the history a vice-president of the European Parliament has been dismissed.

The case was reported in international media. Before the vote, Czarnecki urged MEPs to vote against his dismissal, arguing that such a vote would "support freedom of speech", and in a letter to the president of the European Parliament Antonio Tajani, he lied that he had not compare Róża Thun to Nazi collaborators. In June 2019, the Court of Justice of the European Union dismissed Ryszard Czarnecki's complaint about the dismissal.

Róża Thun considered Czarnecki's statement humiliating. She demanded an apology in the media and a payment of 50,000 zloty for the organization Forum for Dialogue (Forum dla Dialogu) and the "Children of the Holocaust" Association (Stowarzyszenie „Dzieci Holocaustu”). In August 2019, the District Court in Warsaw ruled that Czarnecki, by comparing Róża Thun to Nazi collaborators, violated her good name, and therefore ordered him to publish an apology to the MEP on the portal that published the original interview, as well as on his own blog, within 14 days from the judgment validation. The court also ordered Czarnecki a payment for the benefit of the two organizations mentioned, of 15 thousand zlotys each. Czarnecki announced an appeal against the sentence. In September 2020, the Court of Appeal in Warsaw upheld the judgment of the first instance court, ordering Czarnecki to apologize for an “inappropriate and deeply hurtful” comparison, which was unlawful, and to pay the sum ordered in the first instance for the benefit of the two organizations. The court indicated that the defendant exceeded the limits of acceptable criticism and abused the freedom of speech.

== Involvement in C.H. scandal ==
In September 2024, Czarnecki and his wife Emilia Hermaszewska were suspected of corruption, allegedly receiving 92,000 Złoty ($23,000) from Collegium Humanum – Warsaw Management University via fake employment of Hermaszewska at C.H. in return for using his political influence to help the university open branches abroad, particularly in Uzbekistan. Czarnecki was a professor honoris causa of C.H.

== See also ==
- 2004 European Parliament election in Poland
- European Anti-Fraud Office (OLAF)
- MEPs for Poland 2004–2009
