= Permanent Electoral Authority (Romania) =

Romanian electoral agency

- Autoritatea Electorală Permanentă
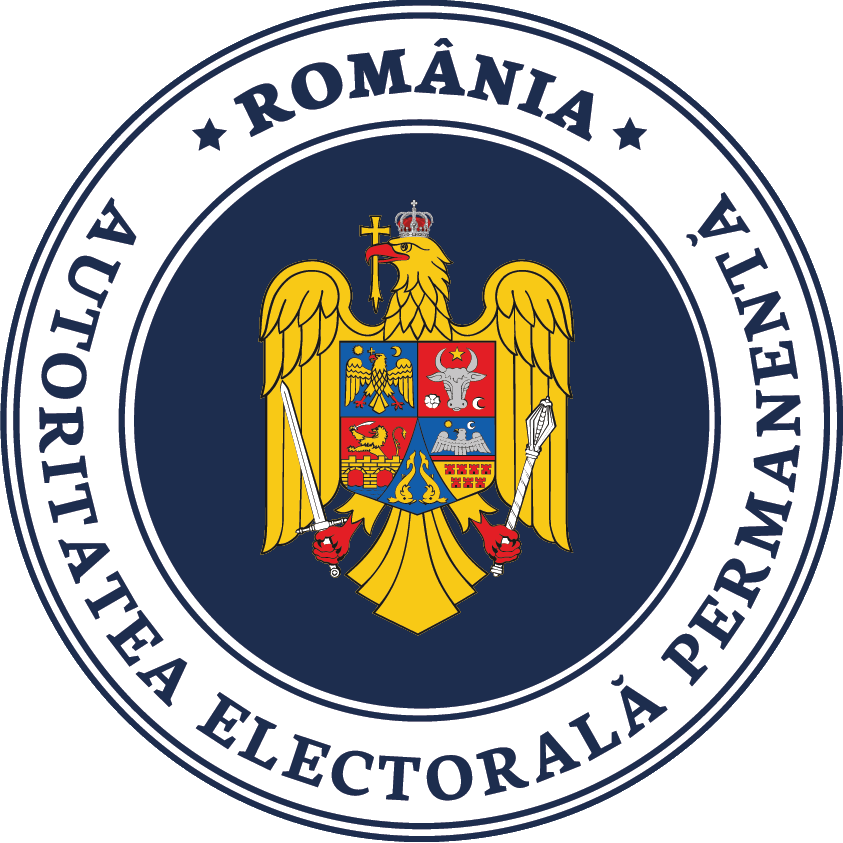

Agency overview
- Formed: 2001
- Jurisdiction: Elections in Romania
- Website: www.roaep.ro

The Permanent Electoral Authority (Romanian: Autoritatea Electorală Permanentă) is the Romanian agency that manages the country's electoral infrastructure between elections. During each election, it creates a new Central Electoral Bureau (Romanian: Biroul Electoral Central) to oversee the electoral process.

== Mandate ==
The Permanent Electoral Authority is responsible for organising and conducting elections, ensuring citizens can freely exercise their right to vote and no political parties are favoured by the electoral process. It must also ensure that electoral campaigns and their funding are transparent and publicly available. It is officially an autonomous administrative institution that is independent from the Romanian government.

== Composition of the Central Electoral Bureau ==
For presidential elections, the Central Electoral Bureau is made up of five judges from the High Court of Cassation and Justice, the president and vice-presidents of the Permanent Electoral Authority, and up to ten representatives from political parties or formations. For parliamentary elections, the composition is similar except there can be up to 12 representatives from political formations, as well as a representative appointed by the Parliamentary Group of National Minorities in the Chamber of Deputies.

== 2024 elections ==
The Permanent Electoral Authority announced the introduction of an electronic voting system before the presidential and parliamentary elections. The results of the first round of the presidential election were annulled by the Constitutional Court of Romania, over allegations of foreign interference through online disinformation of campaigns. A notable discrepancy highlighted by the court was front-runner Călin Georgescu's campaign reporting no external spending to the Permanent Electoral Authority, despite the campaign's large online presence as assessed by Romanian intelligence services.
