= Marius Lulea =

Romanian architect and co-founder of AUR

First Vice-President of the Alliance for the Union of Romanians
- In office 2020 – November 2025
- Leader: George Simion; Claudiu Târziu
- Preceded by: Position established
- Succeeded by: Dan Dungaciu

Founding President of the Alliance for the Union of Romanians
- In office September 19, 2019 – 2020
- Succeeded by: George Simion & Claudiu Târziu (as Co-Presidents)

Personal details
- Born: October 20, 1980 (age 46) Piatra-Neamț, Romania
- Party: Alliance for the Union of Romanians (AUR)
- Relatives: Sorin Lulea (brother)
- Education: Technical University of Civil Engineering of Bucharest (PhD)
- Occupation: Civil engineer, real estate developer, author
- Known for: Co-founding and financing the AUR party
- Website: luleamariusdorin.ro

Marius Dorin Lulea (born 20 October 1980) is a Romanian engineer, businessman, and politician. He was a co-founder of the Alliance for the Union of Romanians (AUR), alongside George Simion and Claudiu Târziu. He served as AUR's first vice president until November 2025.

== Early life and education ==
Lulea was born on 20 October 1980 in Piatra Neamț. He attended the Computer Science High School in Piatra Neamț from 1995 to 1999. From 1999 to 2004, he studied civil engineering and construction management at the Technical University of Civil Engineering of Bucharest, graduating from the Faculty of Civil, Industrial and Agricultural Construction. He later completed doctoral studies between 2016 and 2022.

Lulea works as a construction engineer and is affiliated with Ideal Proiect Arhitecture and Engineering SRL, a company that does architecture and construction projects in Tunari, Ilfov County.

== Business career ==
Lulea employed George Simion at his company from 2012 to 2020 where Simion worked as marketing director. Romanian media reported different figures for his monthly salary and questioned the position. Some reports said the position provided Simion with a formal source of income and social insurance contributions.

He is married to Oriana Costandache, the daughter of Ticu Costandache, a former prefect of Vrancea County.

== Political career ==
=== Founding of AUR ===
Before the establishment of AUR, Lulea was involved in the Unionist Platform, a movement supporting the union of Romania and Moldova. He was among the founders of AUR. The Register of Political Parties listed Lulea Marius-Dorin and his brother, Lulea Sorin, among the party's founding members.

Lulea became AUR's first vice president and later the party also proposed him as a candidate for Prime Minister of Romania.

=== AUR leadership ===
In December 2023, Lulea criticized the proposed 2024 budget of the governing PSD-PNL coalition. He argued that the budget provided for excessive expenditure and that its revenue estimates were unrealistic.

Lulea denounced the government's proposed fiscal measures in the so-called "Ordonanța trenuleț”. He stated that higher taxes would reduce the tax base and criticized the removal of tax incentives for employees in construction, and information technology. He said AUR supported increasing the tax base rather than tax rates and increasing domestic production.

George Simion suspended him from the position of first vice president after Lulea publicly opposed AUR's support for the mayoral candidacy of political analyst Cozmin Gușă in Bucharest in the April 2024 elections. Lulea had said that AUR had already selected Mihai Enache as its candidate and it should be that way. Simion described Lulea's statement as inappropriate and announced his suspension.

After Simion lost the second round of the 2025 Romanian presidential election to Nicușor Dan, Lulea was among the AUR figures who acknowledged the result while Simion disputed the election.

At the AUR congress on 30 November 2025, Lulea was removed from the party leadership and replaced as first vice president by sociologist Dan Dungaciu. Lulea said that he would not seek another senior position in the party and would remain a member.

== Political positions ==
Lulea discussed the rule of Nicolae Ceaușescu in a televised debate on Antena 3 CNN on 13 May 2025. He described him as a sovereigntist and referred to Romania's refusal to participate in the Warsaw Pact invasion of Czechoslovakia in 1968. He also cited the plentiful construction of housing and hydroelectric plants during the communist period.

In response to a photograph posted by Simion during a visit to the United States showing a cake shaped like Greenland with a United States flag, Lulea wrote on Facebook that Greenland was part of Denmark and that Denmark was part of Europe.

In February 2026, Lulea said in an interview on the Agora podcast that Romania should not enter a war and questioned increased military spending. He also argued that, in some circumstances, temporarily giving up territory could be preferable to entering a prolonged conflict, referring to the Russo-Ukrainian war.

Even when no longer holding a senior role, Lulea has said that AUR should support a motion of no confidence against the government only if its supporters presented an alternative government. He called for the proposed parliamentary majority, prime minister, cabinet, and initial government measures to be made public before a vote. He also stated that an agreement could designate Călin Georgescu as prime minister. This came amidst the motion of no-confidence that bought down the Bolojan cabinet on 5 May 2026.

== Publications ==
Lulea has published works on engineering, history, economics and human behavior. His books include Basarabia e România, De ce nu Iubim Rusia, Macroeconomie: Arhitectura Prosperității and România, pământul făgăduinței.

He has also written a book about Ion Antonescu. The work argues that Antonescu's wartime record has been characterized unfairly and distinguishes the Iron Guard under its earlier leadership from the movement under Horia Sima.
