= Dan Tanasă =

Romanian politician (born 1981)

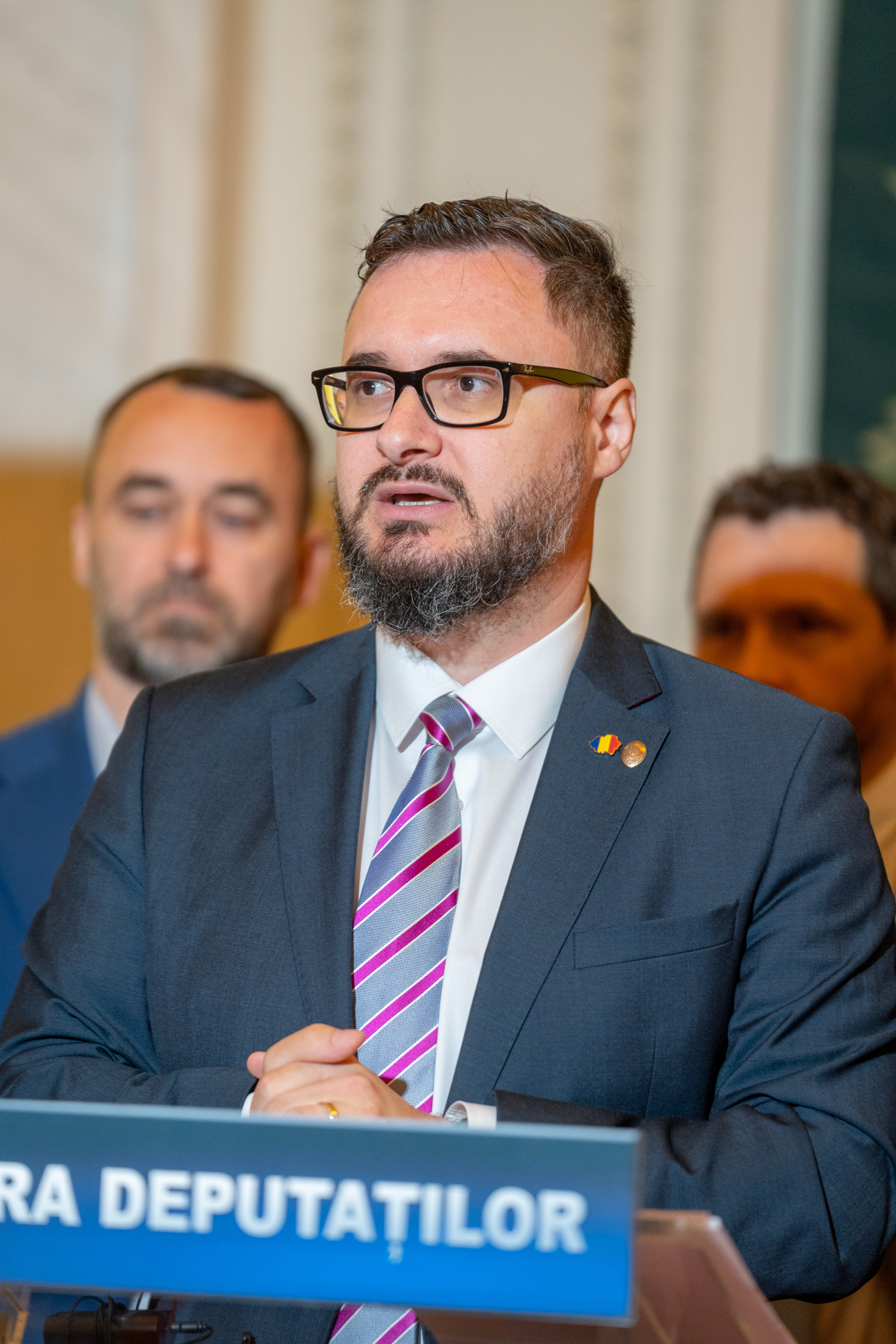
- Tanasă in 2022

Member of the Chamber of Deputies
- Incumbent
- Assumed office 21 December 2020
- Constituency: Mureș

Personal details
- Born: 10 March 1981 (age 45) Sfântu Gheorghe, Socialist Republic of Romania
- Party: Alliance for the Union of Romanians (since 2020); Conservative Party (before 2012)
- Other political affiliations: Social Liberal Union (2011–2012)
- Education: University of Bucharest; National University of Political Studies and Public Administration
- Website: www.dantanasa.ro

Dan Tanasă (born 10 March 1981) is a Romanian politician of the Alliance for the Union of Romanians who was elected member of the Chamber of Deputies in 2020. He serves as spokesperson and vice president of the party, and was its candidate for mayor of Brașov in the 2024 local elections.

He was born in Sfântu Gheorghe, Covasna County and graduated in 2005 from the Faculty of Psychology and Education of the University of Bucharest. In 2011, he obtained an MS degree from the National University of Political Studies and Public Administration with thesis Romania and Romanians in the Hungarian-language press from Romania.

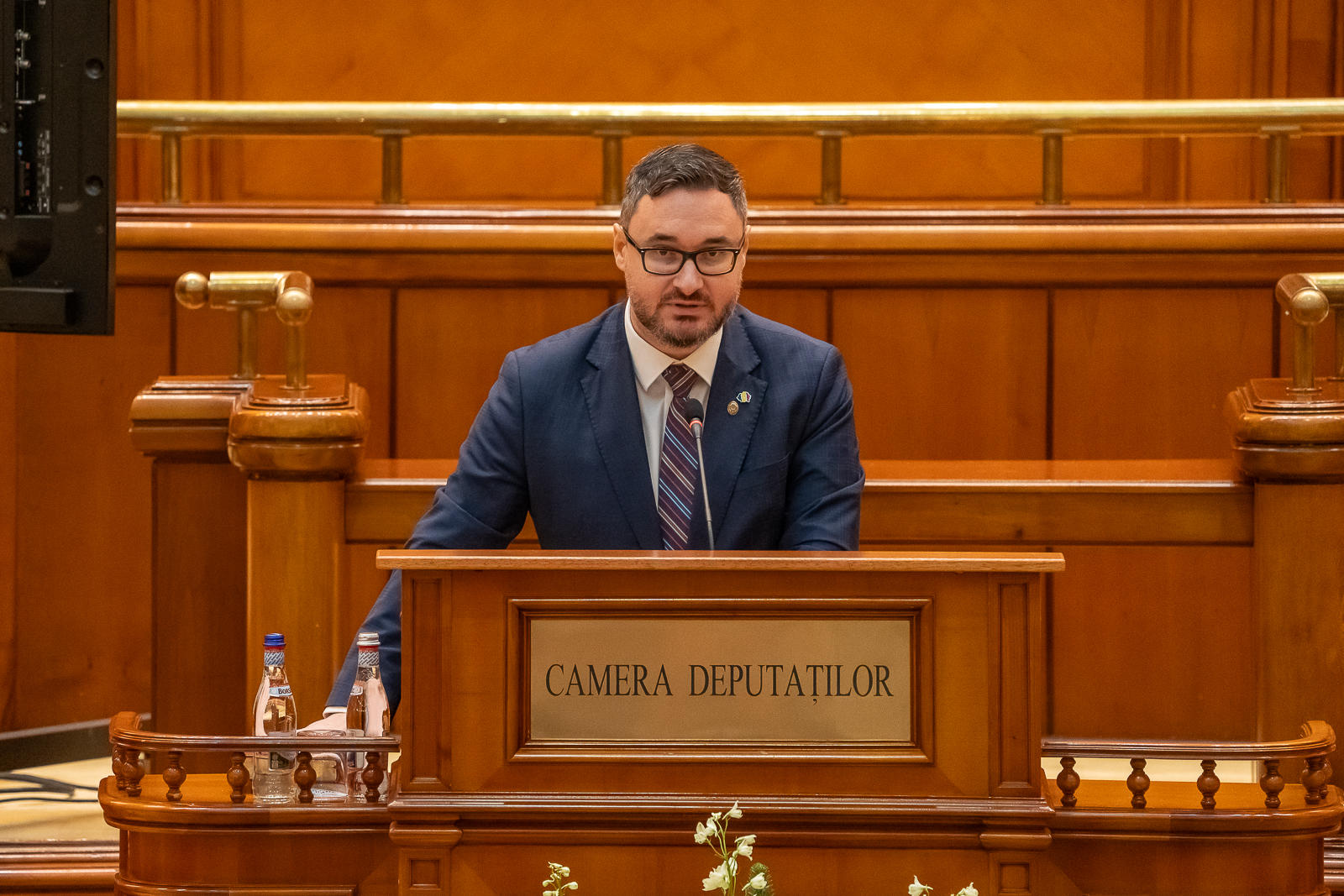
Tanasă taking the oath of office on 21 December 2024

== Biography ==
=== Political career ===
Dan Tanasă was the president of the Spanish organization of the Conservative Party (PC), led by Dan Voiculescu. He resigned from the party in 2012. He then moved closer to the Social Democratic Party (PSD) until 2019. In 2016, the romanian media G4media reported that he was a blogger for the PSD.

Following the 2020 parliamentary elections on 6 December, Tanasă was elected member of the Chamber of Deputies for Mureș County from the Alliance for the Union of Romanians (AUR). He holds the position of president of the Committee for Equal Opportunities for Women and Men of the Chamber of Deputies.

Following the 2024 parliamentary elections on 1 December, Tanasă was re-elected member of the Chamber of Deputies.

== Cases and scandals ==
In June 2019, he participated in the Valea Uzului conflicts alongside George Simion and several other Romanian far-right figures.

In August 2025, Dan Tanasă published a post on Facebook urging users to refuse food deliveries if the courier was not Romanian, arguing that he did not wish to encourage immigration to Romania from Africa and Asia. The remarks sparked controversy in the Romanian public sphere, and a criminal complaint was subsequently filed against him for alleged “incitement to hatred”. On 17 July 2026, he was summoned to the Prosecutor General’s Office in Bucharest and questioned in connection with the case.
