= Doamne, ocrotește-i pe români =

Romanian patriotic song

"Doamne, ocrotește-i pe români" (transl. "God, protect the Romanians") is a Romanian patriotic song. One of the most famous parts of the song refers to Romania as săracă țară bogată ("you poor, rich country"). Famous singers of the song include Veta Biriș, Nicolae Furdui Iancu and Sava Negrean Brudașcu. In August 1988, poet Adrian Păunescu composed a politically sensitive version first performed on stage in 1990, following the Romanian Revolution which overthrew the Romanian communist government. A parody of the song with xenophobic lyrics against Hungarians also exists and was played in 2018 during a match between Juventus București and Sepsi OSK Sfântu Gheorghe on a stadium of the former. Both had members of Romania's Hungarian minority. "Doamne, ocrotește-i pe români" was also sung by ethnic Romanians during the ethnic incident between Hungarians and Romanians in Valea Uzului in 2019. The lyrics of the song are the following:

Doamne, nu uita de noi,
Suntem săraci, plini de nevoi,
Doamne, ocrotește-i pe români.

Suntem săraci și plini de-amar,
Plânsu' nostru-i în zadar,
Doamne, ocrotește-i pe români.

Săracă țară bogată,
Mult ai trăit supărată,
Doamne, ocrotește-i pe români.

Ne-o umplut amarul crud,
Plânsul nostru-i tot mai surd,
Doamne, ocrotește-i pe români.

Transilvania mea sfântă,
De mult ai fost tu râvnită,
Doamne, ocrotește-i pe români.

Dar e-al nost' Ardealu-i sfânt,
De când suntem pe pământ,
Doamne, ocrotește-i pe români.

Translation:

God, do not forget us,
We are poor, full of needs,
God, protect the Romanians.

We are poor and full of bitterness,
Our crying is in vain,
God, protect the Romanians.

You poor, rich country,
Much have you lived upset,
God, protect the Romanians.

Crude bitterness has filled us,
Our crying is even more deaf,
God, protect the Romanians.

My holy Transylvania,
For a long time you have been coveted,
God, protect the Romanians.

But our Transylvania is holy,
Ever since we have been on earth,
God, protect the Romanians.

The tune of the song is derived from another march sung during the Hungarian–Romanian War known as "Marseilleza românilor ardeleni" (transl. "Marseillaise of the Transylvanian Romanians") or "La Dealul Sătmarului" (transl. "At the hill of Sătmar"). Romanian general Alexandru Hanzu, commander of the 16th Infantry Division, was recorded singing this march in 1919 on his way from Ciucea to Budapest during the war. The melody of this march was continued by "Doamne, ocrotește-i pe români" although with different lyrics. The original lyrics of this march are as follows:

La Dealul Sătmarului
Vin caii dușmanului
Și se suie sus pe deal
Să se uite în Ardeal
Doamne, ocrotește-i pe români.

Scoborâți de pe cai jos
Că Ardealul nu-i al vost
Că-i țara românilor
De pe vremea dacilor
Doamne, ocrotește-i pe români.

Suntem săraci, plini de nevoi
Doamne-ndură-te de noi
S-apărăm Ardealul sfânt
Pân-om fi pe acest pământ
Doamne, ocrotește-i pe români.

Pentru acest pământ murim
Doamne ajută să-i răzbim
Acest pământ nu-i al lor
Nici în vecii vecilor
Doamne, ocrotește-i pe români.

Translation:

At the hill of Sătmar
The enemy's horses are coming
And he goes up the hill
To look over Transylvania
God, protect the Romanians.

Get off the horses
Because Transylvania is not yours
Because it is the land of the Romanians
Since the time of the Dacians
God, protect the Romanians.

We are poor, full of needs
God have mercy on us
To defend the holy Transylvania
Until we are on this land
God, protect the Romanians.

For this land we die
God help us break through them
This land is not theirs
Never ever
God, protect the Romanians.
