= Centenary March =

March in Romania and Moldova

The Centenary March (Romanian: Marșul Centenarului) or Centenary March of the Great Union (Romanian: Marșul Centenarului Marii Uniri) was a civic demonstration organized by George Simion and various non-governmental organizations from Romania and Moldova, known under the collective name "Alliance for the Centenary". It started in Alba Iulia (Romania) on 1 July 2018 and ended in Chișinău (Moldova) on 1 September 2018. Its participants, both Moldovans and Romanians, targeted 300 cities and villages, passing through several points significant for the Great Union (Bessarabia, Bukovina and Transylvania).

== Organization of the march ==
The march was 1,300 km long and was initially divided into 11 stages of more or less 5 days each:

1. Alba Iulia – Căianu Mic (1–5 July)
2. Căianu Mic – Bahnea (7–11 July)
3. Bahnea – Sibiu (13–17 July)
4. Sibiu – Curtea de Argeș (18–22 July)
5. Curtea de Argeș – Târgoviște (24–28 July)
6. Târgoviște – Cerașu (29 July–3 August)
7. Cerașu – Ojdula (5–9 August)
8. Ojdula – Tecuci (11–15 August)
9. Tecuci – Vaslui (17–20 August)
10. Vaslui – Iași (21–24 August)
11. Iași – Chișinău (26 August–1 September)

In the Centenary March, generally between 20 and 30 km per day were walked on foot. During it, the participants intended to collect one million signatures to launch a referendum on the unification of Moldova and Romania, which was one of the main objectives of the march. Participants were often accompanied by three buses sent by the city hall of Iași, each with a color of the flag of Romania (blue, yellow and red). They were used as "mobile museums" with images from the First World War and the Great Union. Action 2012 was involved in the march's organization.

== March ==
=== First stage (Alba Iulia–Căianu Mic) ===
On 1 July the Centenary March started in Alba Iulia, in the region of Transylvania. Local authorities and civilians lit the Union Flame in front of the Coronation Cathedral, where Ferdinand I was proclaimed King of Greater Romania, which is the reason why the city was chosen as the starting point. Hundreds of participants, armed with torches, came from both Romania and Moldova. In Piața Tricolorului, people gave speeches about the importance of union with Moldova and held a Romanian flag 100 metres (330 feet) long. They stated that they thought the march was a step forward towards the unification of both states. Afterwards, they started the route towards Chișinău. The first stage of the march, from 1 to 5 July, covered a route starting in Alba Iulia, passing through Teiuș, Unirea, Turda and Cluj-Napoca and ending in Căianu Mic. It was estimated that between 50 and 100 people would participate in this stage of the march. George Simion appealed people to participate in the march:

Come with us on the march, come when we cross the Prut and especially on September 1 in Chișinău. We are people of action. We have set out to collect a million signatures to make the Union and we will collect them. It takes each of you for that. At the end of the year, we will have parliamentary elections across the Prut [in Moldova]. We must do justice in the Republic of Moldova. But let no one be mistaken, the only way to do justice is the Union with Romania. We must not wait for these elections and continue to worship the border at the Prut. It is time to take it down and start this march, kilometer by kilometer.

On 3 July the march abandoned Alba County and arrived in the village of Dumbrava, in Cluj County. At this point, the participants had already passed through Teiuș, Aiud, Decea and Unirea ever since their start in Alba Iulia. Here, they visited the Dumbrava Monastery, and some hours later, they entered the town of Turda. They went to the Mihai Vodă Monastery of the town, near the Obelisk of Michael the Brave. The latter was a Wallachian prince who briefly ruled for the first time in history the three principalities inhabited by Romanians (Moldavia, Transylvania and Wallachia). Afterwards, they stayed in the city center for a while.

On 4 July the participants arrived in Cluj-Napoca through a gas station at night. They continued the march through several streets of the city, where they found people dressed in traditional Romanian dresses and monarchists with royal flags. Afterwards, they were received in the Dormition of the Theotokos Cathedral, in the Avram Iancu Square, by Andrei Andreicuț, metropolitan bishop of the Metropolis of Cluj, Maramureș and Sălaj. They then stopped at the Piața Unirii at approximately 21:00, thus walking the first 100 kilometres (62 miles) of the march. There, the participants started chanting Basarabia, pământ românesc! ("Bessarabia, Romanian land!"). The participants were welcomed by representatives of the municipality of Cluj-Napoca, greeted the people of the city and offered them Romanian tricolor flags and other symbols. Simion appealed to more people to participate in the upcoming ten stages of the march.

On 5 July the first stage of the Centenary March ended in Căianu Mic, in Bistrița-Năsăud County, where the participants received help and support from the locals.

=== Second stage (Căianu Mic–Bahnea) ===
On 7 July the second stage began, which covered Căianu Mic, Cămărașu, Crăiești, Reghin, Târgu Mureș and Bahnea. The participants of the first stage passed the Union Flame to those of the second, and these began the journey. Under torrential rains, they crossed Lechința, where they were received by the mayor Romeo Florian. They also passed through Sărmășel-Gară (thus entering Mureș County), Satu Nou and Silivașu de Câmpie, where the mayor Ioan Dâmbean assisted them. Then, they spent the night in Crăiești and marched towards Reghin. To face the rain, patriotic songs and unionist messages were sung. Simion stated that although they rarely have breaks, the participants are not tired and are happy to have already traveled a good distance from Alba Iulia. Adrian Balica, a 73-year-old man from Grătiești, Moldova, stood out as the oldest participant at the moment.

The participants reached Fărăgău on 9 July. At the entrances of the village, they were received by the priest Hadrian Horațiu Mălinaș and the mayor Ioan Milășan. Together, they walked to the center of the village while singing a patriotic song. After having lunch and talking with the natives for two hours, the participants resumed their way to Reghin. They arrived in the afternoon, and found that the inhabitants of the city had prepared a special reception for them at 18:00 in the parking lot of a restaurant. The authorities congratulated the participants for this initiative and urged them to continue taking the Union Flame to Bessarabia. Fanfares were played, traditional dances were performed and bread and salt was shared.

On 10 July the participants arrived in Târgu Mureș. They reported that, during the journey through Mureș County, the march was supported by many local mayors and Eastern Orthodox priests. At the entrance to the city, a small march was made in front of the Ascension of the Lord Cathedral, shouting Mureș vrea Unire! (Mureș wants the Union!). Several ordinary citizens, as well as members of various associations such as the New Right Association, the Civic Forum of the Romanians of Covasna, Harghita and Mureș, or the Free Dacians Association, among others, attended the marchers in the city. The city council of Târgu Mureș offered accommodation and food for the participants.

By 13 July the Centenary March was in the village of Bahnea.

=== Third stage (Bahnea–Sibiu) ===
The third stage of the march would begin on 13 July. The participants of the second stage, while still in Bahnea, gave the Union Flame to those who would participate in the third one. This stage would take place in Bahnea, Hoghilag, Sighișoara, Agnita, Nocrich and Sibiu. Therefore, the same day, the participants arrived in Sighișoara. Here, they visited the Historic Centre of Sighișoara and stayed at night at a lyceum. The City Council of Iași decided to send three buses collectively known as the "Union Caravan" (Caravana Unirii) to the march, each with a color of the Romanian flag (blue, yellow and red). These buses were intended to be used as "museums on wheels" about the centenary of the Great Union. However, Dan Coțcaru, a journalist from the city, complained about the activities that were taking place on the march (parties and drinking) and that the buses were being ignored.

On 14 July the march left in the morning and went to Daneș, where the city council housed them. Coțcaru complains that Simion left the buses in Sighișoara and did not notify the bus drivers where they had to go next.

On 15 July the participants passed through Dumbrăveni and Mediaș and reached Copșa Mică, all of them in Sibiu County and walking approximately 32 km (20 mi). This town had already sent a delegation to Alba Iulia on the first day of the march. The authorities of the town received and prepared a dinner for them. As there was not enough accommodation, the local fire department permitted the participants to stay there during the night. Although the mayor of Copșa Mică offered the participants another night in the town, these left in the morning and marched towards Slimnic and Sibiu. Coțcaru reports that the following night, in Slimnic, a drunk participant who believed his luggage was stolen threatened to kill one of the bus drivers. Half an hour later, his luggage was found and the situation calmed down.

On 17 July, around noon, the Centenary March finally reached Sibiu, thus ending the third stage and completing 300 km (190 mi). Upon arrival, the participants received a blessing from the priest Constantin Necula at the Holy Trinity Cathedral urging them not to give up and to fight for unification. Afterwards, they marched to the city's Piața Mare ("Grand Square") while singing Trăiască, trăiască, trăiască și înflorească, Moldova, Ardealul și Țara Românească! ("Long live, long live, long live and flourish, Moldavia, Transylvania and Wallachia!"). Once there, they held hands, sang patriotic songs, talked with the locals and shared flags, calendars and nationalist insignias. They were also received by the Society for Romanian Culture and Literature in Bukovina. Simion insisted that despite the difficulties, they would not give up. He also said that many people were greeting and helping them. An appeal was made for volunteers to donate more water, food, sleeping bags and shoes for the participants. The Metropolis of Transylvania offered to the participants rooms to pass the night. The three buses accompanied the march all day.

=== Fourth stage (Sibiu–Curtea de Argeș) ===
On 18 July the march left Sibiu to start the fourth stage with the Union Flame with them. This stage ran through Sibiu, Brezoi, Tuțulești, the Cozia Monastery, Râmnicu Vâlcea and Curtea de Argeș. From Sibiu, the participants arrived at Turnu Roșu and stayed in its monastery during the night. The next day, the participants crossed the Carpathians through the Olt Valley, a risky path due to the poor conditions of the road, not suitable for the cross of people, many of whom wore reflective vests. They arrived in Brezoi (Vâlcea County, in the region of Wallachia), where a blues festival was taking place. They said that they would have liked to spend the night there, but since they did not know about the festival, they had planned to spend the night elsewhere. They also reached Tuțulești and the Cozia Monastery in Călimănești, where they were well received but had to leave quickly due to delay.

On 21 July the march arrived in Fedeleșoiu, where they were warmly congratulated by the population. These gave them food, fresh water and flowers. They visited the Fedeleșoiu Monastery, where priests and other persons in traditional costumes greeted them with the typical local cuisine. The same day, they went to the city of Râmnicu Vâlcea, entering through the east of the city and being at 18:30 in front of the city council. The three buses arrived much earlier, at 11:00, and stayed at the Mircea cel Bătrân Park with an exhibition about the Great Union. Many were interested in them, and they stayed in the city center until night. Some thought they were buses of political parties; they associated the red one with the PSD, the yellow one with the PNL and the blue one with the PMP. A priest invited the participants to the St. Dumitru Church and offered them a blessing, to which they responded by singing the song Când a fost să moară Ștefan ("When Stephen was about to die"). The police also received them, checking that the march did not consist of any type of propaganda.

On 22 July the fourth stage of the march ended in Curtea de Argeș (the first Wallachian capital), covering around 450 km (280 mi) in total since the start of the march. The participants arrived in the city in the afternoon, at approximately 19:20. The first destination was the Princely Church. Here, they met with several citizens, with whom they marched towards the Curtea de Argeș Cathedral. Along the way, they were greeted and applauded by the population. Once there in the cathedral, they met the priest Adrian Enache, who talked to them about the tomb of the Wallachian ruler Neagoe Basarab, as well as the ones of kings Carol I and Ferdinand I and the queens Elisabeth and Marie. Afterwards, they went to the Municipal Museum and visited the bust of Michael the Brave. The march was received by the mayor and vice mayor, who offered accommodation, and by the Archdiocese of Argeș and Muscel, who donated food to it. Again, the buses arrived earlier, at 10:30, and showed its exhibition to the population. Corbi, a village in the area, also offered them a place during the night.

== Crossing of the border with Moldova ==
On 27 August 2018, although the participants did not encounter any problems with the Romanian Border Police, the authorities of the Republic of Moldova did not allow them to enter under the pretext of "disturbance of the public order in the border area". When Romania asked for an explanation for this ban two days later, the Moldovan authorities allowed the participants to enter with the exception of Simion, who was returned to Romania without a clear explanation. At first he was banned from entering Moldova for 24 hours, but after he tried to enter again, he was banned for 2 months. Despite the obstacles from the Moldovan authorities, the Centenary March was welcomed by thousands of enthusiasts, ending in a demonstration at the Great National Assembly Square in Chișinău.

== See also ==
- Moldova–Romania relations
