= Stela Popa =

Moldovan journalist and author

- Born: 7 August 1982 (age 44); Coșcodeni, Moldavian SSR, Soviet Union
- Education: Moldova State University
- Known for: Journalist, news anchor for Romanian Public Television Știrile TVR
- Spouse: Dan Dungaciu

Stela Popa (born 7 August 1982) is a journalist and author from Moldova. She works for Romanian National Television, Jurnal TV and Vocea Basarabiei.

== Biography ==
Stela Popa was born on 7 August 1982 in Coșcodeni, Sîngerei District. She studied at Prometeu-Prim Lyceum and graduated from Moldova State University. She worked for Radio-Sângera, Euro TV Moldova, TV7 (Moldova) and was a correspondent of Antena 1 (Romania) in Chișinău. Popa has been the director of Vocea Basarabiei in Bucharest since June 2009. She married Romanian sociologist Dan Dungaciu in October 2012.

== Awards ==
- Diplomă de excelență și merite la învățătură, Moldova State University
- Prize VIP of the Faculty of Journalism and Communication Studies of the Moldova State University
- Prize, Contest "Jurnalismul de azi, jurnalismul de mâine"
- Top VIP Magazin "Cele mai sexy 50 de femei ale Moldovei"
- Prize FIJET România

== Works ==
- "100 de zile", Editura Tritonic, Bucharest, 2010, 464 pages. The book is dedicated to 7 April 2009 Moldova civil unrest
