= Ethnic clashes of Târgu Mureș =

1990 period of anti-Hungarian violence in Transylvania, Romania

The ethnic clashes of Târgu Mureș (also called Black March, Hungarian: Fekete Március) refer to incidents between the Hungarians and Romanians in Târgu Mureș and surrounding settlements in Transylvania, Romania in March 1990. The clashes were the bloodiest inter-ethnic incidents of the post-communist era in Transylvania. Târgu Mureș (Hungarian: Marosvásárhely) is a Romanian town with an ethnically mixed population that was almost equally distributed between Romanians and Hungarians after the fall of the communist regime in December 1989. It has been a cultural and political center for the Hungarian minority in Transylvania.

In March 1990, clashes occurred there between the two ethnic groups in the town, involving ethnic Romanians from neighbouring villages. The clashes left 5 people dead and 300 injured. The riots were broadcast nationally on Romanian television and were covered by media around the world.

The exact cause is still widely disputed. The roles of the media and the Romanian government are also questioned.

== The events ==
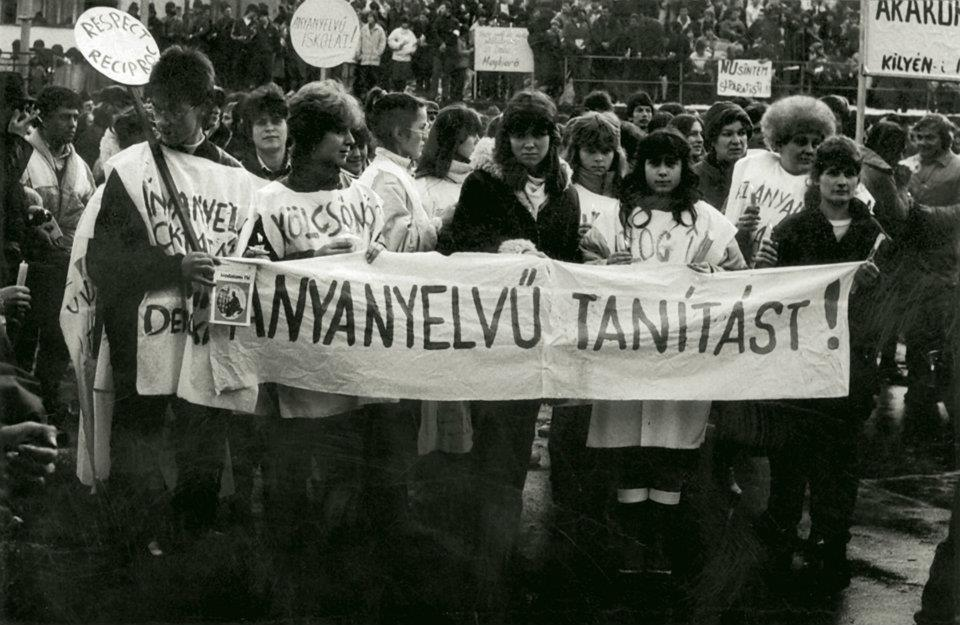
Demonstration for Hungarian education

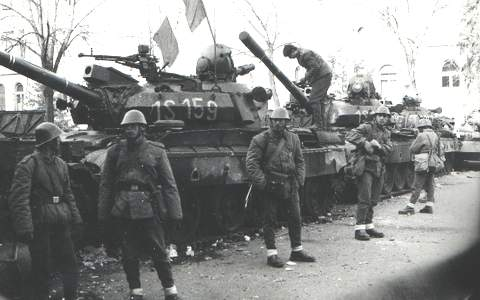
Romanian troops on the streets of Târgu Mureș

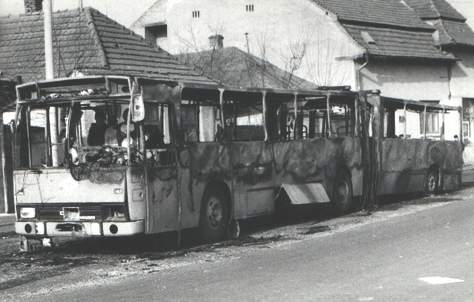
Destroyed buses

At the beginning of March 1990, two episodes involving Romanian statues occurred. Graffiti was found on the statue of the Romanian historical figure Avram Iancu, and a statue of another Romanian personality in a neighboring town was stolen. A Romanian newspaper referred to events of the same kind that took place before the 1940 Romanian-Hungarian conflict.

During the celebrations of the Hungarian community on the national day of the Hungarians (15 March), accusations of nationalism and separatism began to be heard from Romanians.

The next day, groups of intoxicated Romanians began to attack state-owned stores in which ethnic Hungarians had changed the signage to include Hungarian. Students sang anti-Hungarian songs and pillaged a Hungarian Protestant church.

On 19 March, Romanian villagers, dispatched by coach and train, arrived in the city and attacked the headquarters of the Democratic Union of Hungarians in Romania. The local Hungarians tried to defend it, and the area fell into violence. The involvement of the Romanian government in connection with the stimulation of ethnic violence is not completely unfounded (Andreescu 2001, Gallagher, 2005).

The media enlarged the tensions and contributed, by inflammatory discourse, to the worsening of the situation. The parliamentary report on the events confirmed that the media reported falsely about the heavy influx of Hungarians to help their co-nationals in their fight for a separate Transylvania. Incitements about "separatist" trends were used in an effort to manufacture ethnic conflict.

=== Media issues ===
The events are viewed differently by the sides that were involved. The 16 March incident at "Pharmacy no. 28" is an example of the capacity of the media to present the same event with opposite connotations. A news brief was presented, by both the Romanian and the Hungarian press, both using it to draw attention to the danger represented by the actions of "the others". Romanian media announced that the pharmacist wiped inscriptions in Romanian, and the Hungarian press wrote that the Romanians wiped the Hungarian inscription.

==== Romanian media ====
According to the correspondent of the Romanian television, in the neighbouring town of Sovata, a statue of Nicolae Bălcescu was knocked down, generating protests of Vatra Românească.

Several teams of cameramen from the Romanian army filmed numerous episodes of an explicitly anti-Romanian turn. There were shown groups of Hungarians who chanted "Horthy, Horthy!", "Death to Romanians!" and "Transylvania to Hungary!" A 2010 article from Jurnalul Național talks about the influx of 10,000 Hungarian "tourists" who were officially coming to commemorate the Revolution of 1848. There are accounts in the same period of the desecration of the statues of Avram Iancu, Nicolae Bălcescu and some arson attempts on Romanian houses in Sovata. Such acts have generated counter-manifestations by the Romanian population.

Also, the "road signs war" started and would continue for years throughout Transylvania. One of the Târgu Mureș signs at the entry into the city was replaced with a Marosvasarhely Hungarian sign. The change sparked anger from Azomureș Romanian employees, who restored the Romanian sign.

=== 1990 Human Rights Watch report ===
In March, violence broke out between ethnic Hungarians and Romanians in the Transylvanian city of Târgu Mureș. On 19 March, the headquarters of the Democratic Union of Hungarians in Romania (UDMR) was attacked by a large group of ethnic Romanians. The police and army did not respond to the UDMR's calls for protection until several hours after the attack began. Many ethnic Hungarians trapped inside were seriously injured.

On the following morning, some 15,000 ethnic Hungarians gathered in the town square to protest the previous day's events. A group of approximately 3,000 ethnic Romanians hostile to the Hungarians' demands for autonomy began to gather on one side of the square in the early afternoon. Tensions escalated as word spread that buses of ethnic Romanian peasants from neighboring villages were heading toward town to support the Romanians in the square. By 2:30 p.m., the Chief of Police gave assurances to ethnic Romanian and Hungarian leaders in the square that the police had blocked off entrances to the city. However, unconfirmed reports indicated that the police allowed buses of ethnic Romanians through the roadblocks. Romanian peasants from villages outside Târgu Mureş arrived in the town center long after the roads should have been closed, and joined the Romanians already in the square.

Around 5:00 p.m., violence erupted between ethnic Romanians and ethnic Hungarians, breaking the single line of 50 police that the authorities had sent to divide the two groups. Although the police and army had been made aware of the potential for violence by both Hungarian and Romanian leaders, who had made numerous reports of the escalating tensions in the square, the authorities once again failed to respond in an adequate manner to protect the citizens of Târgu Mureș.

According to the US State Department Human Rights Report for 1993:

The UDMR condemned the Supreme Court's 7 June rejection of an appeal in the case of Pal Cseresznyés, an ethnic Hungarian serving a 10-year sentence for attempted murder as a result of his involvement in the Târgu Mureș incidents of March 1990. Cseresznyés participated in the savage beating of an ethnic Romanian, which an international journalist captured on film. The UDMR's complaint centered on the length of his sentence and on the fact that he was the only one of those filmed who was brought to trial. The court maintained that, regardless of the fates of the others involved, Cseresznyes had received a fair trial and was guilty as charged. Thus it found no legal reason to grant an appeal.

== Casualties and legal consequences ==
There were 5 dead (three ethnic Hungarians and two ethnic Romanians) and 278 injured. During the penal investigation and the court trials that followed, two ethnic Hungarians (Pál Cseresznyés and Ernő Barabás) and seven others were convicted.

=== Emblematic victims ===
There were victims on both sides, two of which received particular attention:

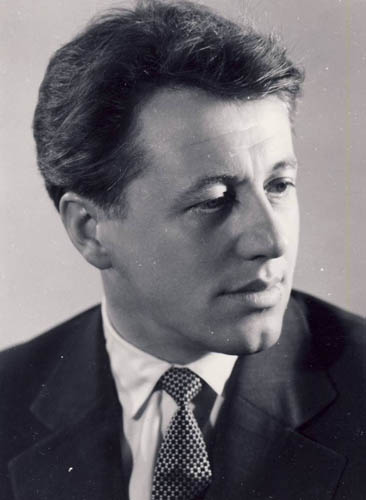
Hungarian writer András Sütő

- On 19 March 1990, the Hungarian writer András Sütő was beaten when Romanians attacked the offices of the Democratic Union of Hungarians (UDMR). With several bones broken and being blinded in one eye, he was carried to the Bucharest Military Hospital, then, later, by a military aircraft to Budapest, Hungary, where his life was saved, but he retained a permanent eye injury. The attackers were never officially identified, or convicted.
- On 20 March 1990, Mihăilă Cofariu, an ethnic Romanian from Ibănești village brought to Târgu Mureș along with others to beat Hungarians was beaten even after he fell unconscious. Following that he remained neurologically disabled. The event was presented in international media as a Hungarian being beaten by Romanians. He was brought in coma to the county's emergency hospital and spent several months in hospitals in Romania and Germany. One of the perpetrators, ethnic Hungarian Pál Cseresznyés, was tried, convicted and sentenced to 10 years in prison, but he was released in 1996 by Romanian President Emil Constantinescu, as an act of reconciliation. The other convicted perpetrator, Ernő Barabás, emigrated to Hungary. He has also received a 10-year imprisonment sentence, but the Hungarian authorities denied all requests for extradition from the Romanian authorities. In 2020, both a Romanian newspaper Evenimentul Zilei as well as a Hungarian newspaper Magyar Narancs confirmed that Ernő Barabás is the owner of the Hell Energy Drink company.

== Dispute over causes ==
The prevalent opinion in the Romanian public is that the incidents were triggered by direct attacks by Hungarians against Romanian institutions, symbols, statues and policemen. They claim that the riots were part of a plan to separate part of Transylvania from Romania to reintegrate it with Hungary.

Most Hungarians maintain, however, that rumours about Hungarian violence against Romanians and/or state institutions were unjustified or widely exaggerated. Hungarians also state that rumours about Hungarian violence were spread to undermine legitimate Hungarian demands (such as language, cultural rights or possible ethnic-based regional autonomy).

== Involvement of Romanian government ==
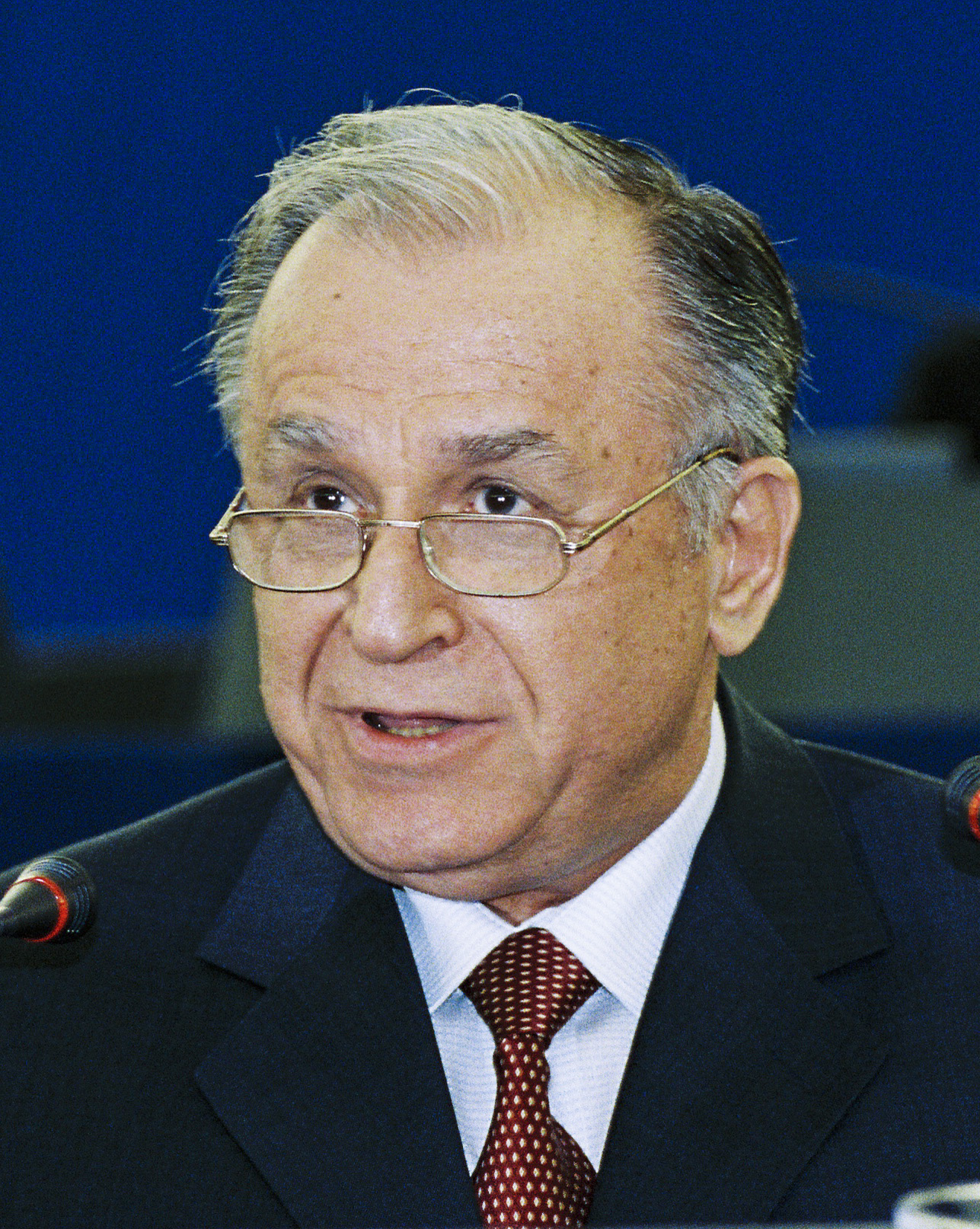
Ion Iliescu, President of Romania at the time of the incident

The nature of the involvement of the Romanian government is also disputed. The official account is that the government succeeded in calming the situation and ended the clashes. However, that has been disputed:

- Multiple Hungarians claim that the government was slow to act and failed to stem the violence at the beginning and thus responsible for its escalation. They support their arguments with filmed scenes in which police or other representatives of the authorities overlook events. They also criticise the fact that the vast majority of those taken into custody after the events were ethnic Hungarians, which suggests an ethnic bias.
- Multiple ethnic Romanians claim that the government did not intervene fast enough to protect the population and that clearly-identified Hungarians involved in the violence were not prosecuted.

According to a 1990 report by Human Rights Watch, "the authorities... failed to respond in an adequate manner to protect the citizens of Târgu Mureș". In this sense, the riots can be seen as a symptom of the fact that police, and the law enforcement agencies in general were weak and morally compromised at the time because of how the communist regime had fallen. That opinion is reinforced by the similar pattern in some subsequent events (Piața Universității and the miners' invasion of Bucharest).

== Involvement of Western media ==
The quality of the Western media's coverage of the riots is contested by multiple Romanians. An often-cited example is the footage of Mihăilă Cofariu, who was presented as a Hungarian being beaten by Romanians in the documentary And the walls came tumbling down: Bad Neighbours, directed by Peter Swain and produced by ethnic Hungarian Paul Neuberg. According to its director, the filming crew arrived in Transylvania after the events, and most footage, including that of Mihăilă Cofariu, were provided by the Hungarian producer team, who let them believe that Cofariu was really a Hungarian being beaten by Romanians.

Also, during filming, the crew had no contact with any ethnic Romanian, and all documentation was gathered only from Hungarian sources, including some Hungarian contacts from the political scene.

Western media, picking up the story from the documentary, presented the Mihăilă Cofariu footage in the same way: as a Hungarian being beaten by Romanians. That falsehood is often used in Romanian media to link various similar cases of anti-Romanian falsehoods in Hungarian and Western media.

== See also ==
- Romanian Hearth Union
- Valea Uzului ethnic conflict
