= Coșcodeni =

- Commune
- Location in Moldova
- Coordinates: 47°29′N 28°03′E
- Country: Moldova
- District: Sîngerei District

Population (2014)
  - Total: 2,573
- Time zone: UTC+2 (EET)
  - Summer (DST): UTC+3 (EEST)

Coșcodeni is a commune in Sîngerei District, Moldova. It is composed of three villages: Bobletici, Coșcodeni and Flămînzeni.

== Notable people ==
- Grigore Baștan (1922–1983)
- Stela Popa, journalist
