= Action 2012 =

Coalition of organizations supporting the unification of Moldova and Romania

- Acțiunea 2012
- Logo of Action 2012
- Formation: 17 April 2011; 15 years ago
- Founder: George Simion
- Type: NGO
- Location: Moldova, Romania
- Website: Official website

Action 2012 (Romanian: Acțiunea 2012), officially Unionist Platform Action 2012 (Romanian: Platforma Unionistă Acțiunea 2012) or Civic Platform Action 2012 (Platforma Civică Acțiunea 2012), is a coalition of non-governmental organizations striving for the unification of Moldova and Romania operating in both Moldova and Romania. It was established on 17 April 2011, bringing together more than 30 unionist NGOs from Romania, Moldova, the United States and several other European countries. Action 2012 takes its name from the year 2012, which marked the 200th anniversary of the annexation of Bessarabia by the Russian Empire away from the Romanian principality of Moldavia. The coalition was founded by George Simion, then a Romanian activist who later became a politician.

Action 2012 has undertaken a large number of activities and initiatives to support the unification of Moldova and Romania. On 10 February 2015, by the initiative of Action 2012, the Friends of the Union Parliamentary Group (Grupul Parlamentar Prietenii Unirii) was created. This entity sought dialogue between parliamentarians of all Romanian parties to ensure the approval of projects between Moldova and Romania and in support of Romanian diaspora. As of 2017, over 100 members of the Chamber of Deputies and the Senate of Romania, which form the Parliament of Romania, were members of the group. Furthermore, in 2016, Action 2012 coordinated the project Know Your Country (Cunoaște-ți Țara), which aimed to take 100,000 Moldovans on trips to Romania in the summer and fall of that year. A similar project, Know Your Brothers (Cunoaște-ți frații), was established by Action 2012 in 2019. This program organized trips from Romania to Moldova. In 2018, Action 2012 was involved in the organization of the Centenary March, a march that intended to cover 1,300 kilometres (810 miles) starting in Alba Iulia in Romania on 1 July and ending in Chișinău in Moldova on 1 September.

Action 2012 also participated on the 2015–2016 protests in Moldova, organizing pro-unification rallies. During these protests, on 14 May 2015, Simion was expelled from Moldova and banned from entering the country for 5 years for "endangering national security" through his activities; the Romanian embassy in Chișinău asked the Moldovan authorities for explanations on this decision. His ban was lifted on 18 September, although he received another one in 2016 and two others in 2018.
