= George Simion =

Romanian activist and politician (born 1986)

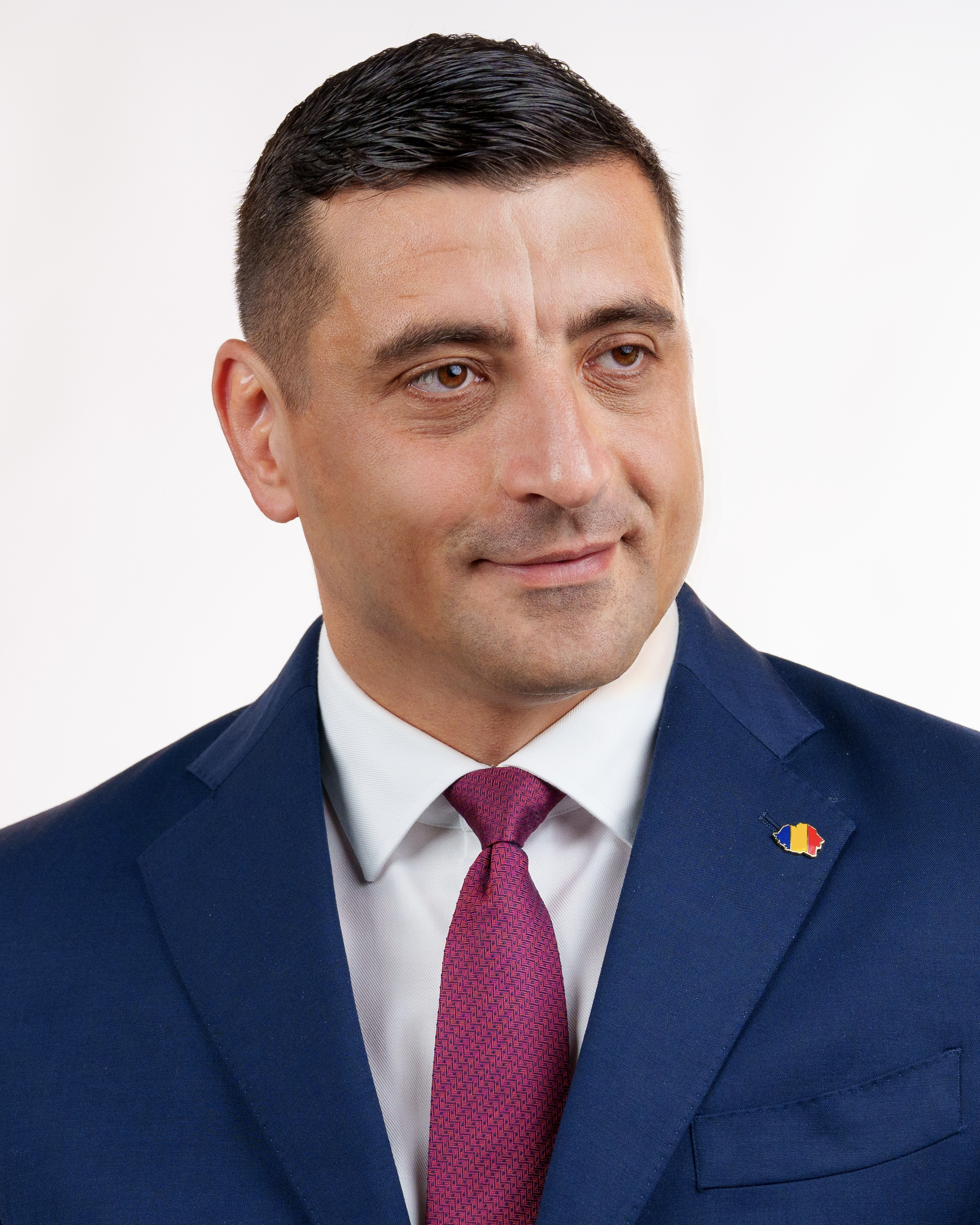
- Simion in 2024

President of the Alliance for the Union of Romanians
- Incumbent
- Assumed office 1 December 2019 (Note: Serving with Claudiu Târziu as co-president until 27 March 2022)
- Preceded by: Party established

Member of the Chamber of Deputies
- Incumbent
- Assumed office 21 December 2020
- Constituency: Bucharest

Vice President of the European Conservatives and Reformists Party
- Incumbent
- Assumed office 14 January 2025
- President: Mateusz Morawiecki

Personal details
- Born: 21 September 1986 (age 40) Focșani, Vrancea County, Socialist Republic of Romania
- Party: Alliance for the Union of Romanians (2019–present)
- Spouse: Ilinca Munteanu (m. 2022)
- Children: 1
- Education: Gheorghe Lazăr National College; University of Bucharest; Alexandru Ioan Cuza University
- Occupation: Civic activist; politician
- Profession: Economist
- Website: georgesimion.ro
- George Simion's voice Simion at a press conference in Bucharest; Recorded 14 March 2025

George Nicolae Simion (Note: Romanian pronunciation: [ˈdʒe̯ordʒe nikoˈla.e simiˈon].) (born 21 September 1986) is a Romanian far-right politician and civic activist. He is the founder and chairman of the Alliance for the Union of Romanians (AUR), the second largest party in both houses of parliament since 2024. He was a candidate in the 2025 Romanian presidential election.

Simion completed his high school studies at the Gheorghe Lazăr National College, before studying business administration at the University of Bucharest and then graduating from Alexandru Ioan Cuza University with a master's degree in history. Following his studies, he began campaigning for the unification of Moldova and Romania, and has since set up notable associations and events for this purpose, such as Action 2012, the Alliance for the Centenary and the Centenary March. As a result of his agitation campaigns, he has been prohibited from entering Moldova on several occasions in the past, and he is currently barred from entering the country as a persona non grata.

In 2019, Simion began to participate in politics, running as an independent candidate for the 2019 European Parliament election in Romania, in which he obtained 117,141 votes. After this, the AUR party was founded on 19 September 2019. The AUR garnered national and international attention after its unexpectedly high vote share in the 2020 Romanian parliamentary election.

Simion has been involved in several controversies, notably AUR's support for two former military officers who had allegedly repressed revolutionaries in the 1989 Romanian Revolution entering the Romanian Parliament or his participation in the Valea Uzului ethnic conflict.

Simion ran as the AUR candidate in the May 2025 Romanian presidential election, winning the first round, but ultimately losing the runoff to Nicușor Dan.

== Early life and education ==
George-Nicolae Simion was born on 21 September 1986 in Focșani, the capital of Vrancea County, in the Socialist Republic of Romania. He is the second of two children born to Constantin Simion from Ialomița and his wife from Vrancea, the other being his elder sister Elena. At an early age, the family moved to the Romanian capital Bucharest, where his parents, both economists, had met when studying at the Bucharest Academy of Economic Studies. Romanian Development Bank.

Constantin suffered from alcoholism and was involved in numerous police confrontations. Simion was thus largely raised in the care of his mother. In 1995, at the age of nine, Simion attended the opening of Romania's first McDonald's restaurant, an event he later reflected upon as among the formative ones in his perceptions of capitalism's influence on post-communist Romanian society.

He completed his secondary education at Gheorghe Lazăr National College in Bucharest, graduating in 2005. He then studied at the Faculty of Business and Administration at the University of Bucharest, where he obtained his bachelor's degree in 2008. In 2010, he completed a master's degree in history at Alexandru Ioan Cuza University in Iași, located in the historical region of Moldavia, with "the crimes of communism" as his research topic. During his academic years, Simion actively participated in student organisations that promoted Romanian history and cultural heritage.

== Civil activism (2004–2019) ==
His first public involvement in civic activism took place in 2004, when he held a banner reading "Heroes never die!" in Timișoara during the 15th commemoration of the Romanian Revolution, that as a part of the revolutions of 1989 ended 42 years of Communist rule in Romania, 24 of which under Nicolae Ceaușescu. Two years later, he led a protest in Bucharest in support of Moldovan students from the Gheorghe Asachi Romanian-French High School of Chișinău. In his youth, Simion and several peers painted graffiti reading "Bessarabia is Romania" at major traffic junctions across the country. Described by Adevărul in 2025 as his first notable protest, on 14 October 2008, Simion was invited to the Romanian Parliament by UDMR senator Péter Eckstein-Kovács. During this visit, he engaged in a verbal confrontation with senator Șerban Nicolae, telling him:

"You're a communist and a neo-communist. You're the defender of Iliescu and the Securitate [...] My uncle died in the Revolution, but your uncle is Iliescu, and you're Iliescu's lackey"

— Simion to Șerban Nicolae, 14 October 2008

Simion gained further public attention in 2009 when on 3 March, the birthday of former president Ion Iliescu (1990–1996, 2000–2004), he lit candles in front of Iliescu's home in memory of the casualties of the Revolution and the June 1990 Mineriad. Simion referred to Illiescu as "the criminal of 1989" and was eventually held in custody of the police. In April 2019, Iliescu was charged with crimes against humanity for actions during those events, with the case unresolved as of 2025. On 17 April 2011, Simion founded Action 2012, a coalition of NGOs and civic associations advocating for the unification of Moldova and Romania. In 2012, he organised a protest in Moldova's second-largest city Bălți under the banner "Bălți feels Romanian". Action 2012 participated in the 2015–2016 protests in Moldova sparked by the disappearance of $1 billion from the Moldovan banks in 2014. In May 2015, the Moldovan Migration and Asylum Bureau ruled Simion undesirable in the Republic of Moldova and was consequently expelled, being classified by the Intelligence and Security Service as "a potential threat to the stability of the country".

In 2017, Simion criticised the Romanian state for not preparing enough events to celebrate the centenary of the Great Union as other countries like Poland had done. Therefore, he founded the Alliance for the Centenary and announced several events for 2018, including a march from Alba Iulia in Romania to Chișinău, the capital of Moldova.

The Centenary March took place from 1 July to 1 September 2018, covering approximately 1,300 kilometres across eleven stages. Organised by Simion, the march aimed to highlight significant sites related to World War I and the Great Union of Romania. The march began on 1 July in Alba Iulia, in front of the Coronation Cathedral, where Ferdinand I was proclaimed king. It concluded on 1 September in Chișinău, Moldova. One of its primary objectives was to promote the unification of Moldova with Romania, with participants striving to gather one million signatures for a referendum on the issue.

The Moldovan authorities initially prevented the participants from crossing the border, but eventually allowed them to enter. The march culminated in a large gathering in Chișinău, where thousands welcomed the participants at the Great National Assembly Square for a final protest. However, Simion was unable to attend the final stage in Moldova, as he had issued a travel ban on 28 August.

=== Entry bans ===
Simion's activism caused outrage from Moldovan authorities, leading to multiple expulsions and entry bans. His first expulsion occurred in March 2009 during a protest marking the 91st anniversary of the union of Bessarabia with Romania. Simion and fellow organiser Eugen Rusu were arrested for alleged violation of public order; Simion received a fine, while Rusu was held in administrative detention. The incident was followed by a broader restriction on Romanian citizens entering Moldova, prompting Romania's foreign ministry to request explanation. In December 2014, he was briefly denied entry again, although the restriction was lifted within hours.

On 14 May 2015, Simion was declared persona non grata and barred for five years from the country on grounds of "endangering national security". After diplomatic pressure from Romanian authorities, the sanction was rescinded in September of the year. Simion was briefly banned again for one day in February 2016. On 28 August 2018, during the Centenary March, Simion was prohibited for thirty days for allegedly displaying "aggressive and inappropriate behaviour" at the Moldova–Romania border. A final five-year ban was issued on 1 October 2018, during which Simion claimed he was arrested and assaulted, sharing photos of his injuries and the ban document online. Moldovan police denied the accusations, stating that the procedure had been peaceful. The current ban is set to expire in 2028 if not changed.

== Early political career (2019–2024) ==
=== 2019 European Parliament election ===
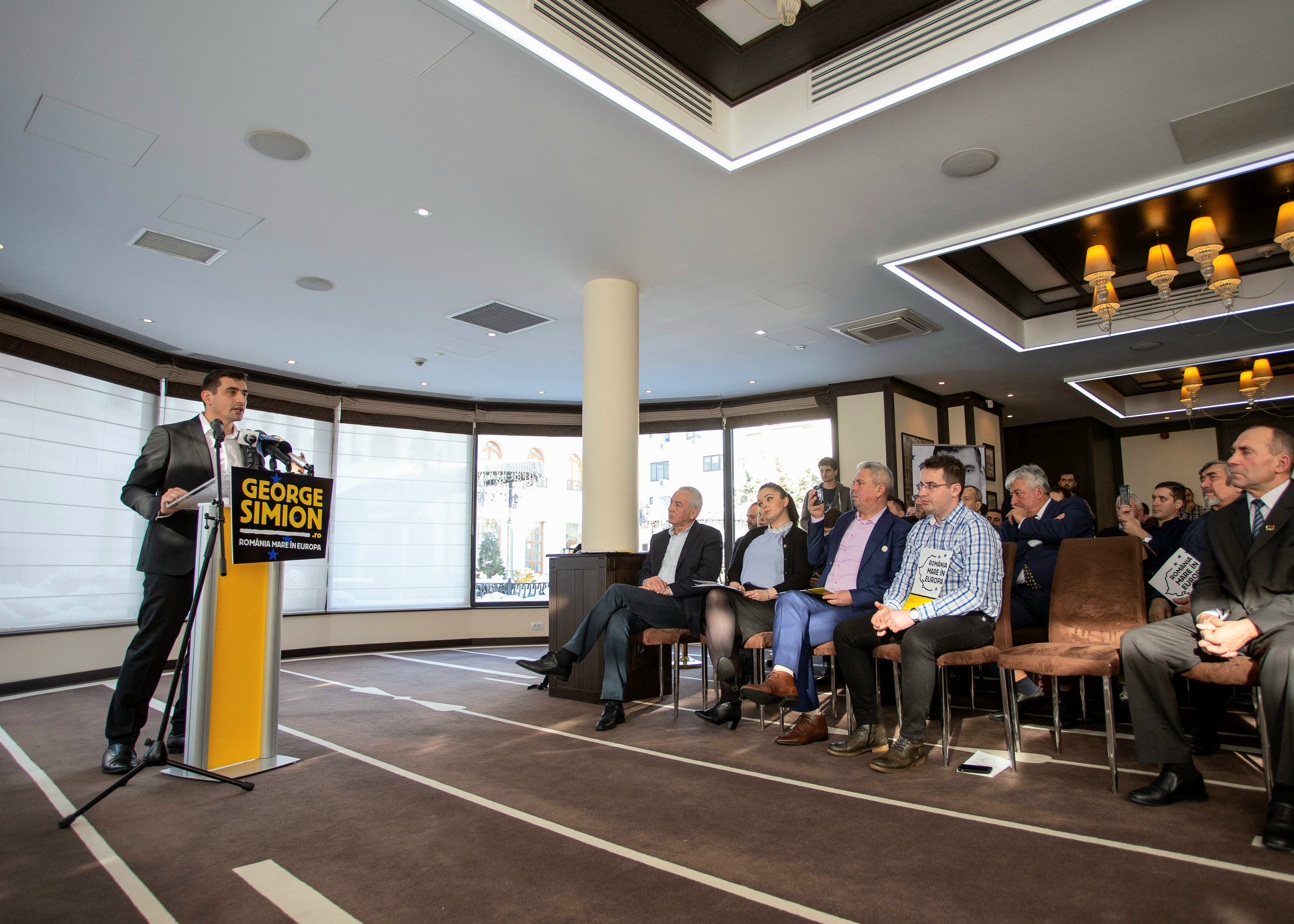
Simion announcing his candidacy for the EU Parliament election, 12 January 2019

Simion began his political career on 12 January 2019, announcing his independent candidacy for the 2019 European Parliament election in Romania. In How I met them, published that same month, he reflected on his decision to enter politics, recalling the government's response to the 2015 Colectiv nightclub fire as particularly pivotal:

"I could no longer contribute within the civic movement, because I had already done everything humanly possible—and beyond human limits—to succeed. After 12 years of activism, I was tired of seeing efforts left unfinished, or even blocked by decision-makers. I truly couldn't go on anymore; my patience had run out"

On his choice to run as an independent, Simion expressed scepticism towards established political parties, concluding that the European Parliament election was the only election in which an independent was likely to win a seat due to the lower electoral threshold. Having already been an activist for the unification of Moldova and Romania, Simion had as his main objective making this project a European one. His campaign slogan was România Mare în Europa ("Greater Romania in Europe"), referring to the borders of the Kingdom of Romania in the interwar period, achieved in 1918 after the Great Union.

In addition to this, he promoted an "anti-party" message, arguing that only an independent candidate and not the different partisan interests could truly represent the interests of the Romanians. Simion declared he would fight for the rights of the Romanian minorities, such as those in Serbia or Ukraine, as well as the protection of the rights of Romanian diaspora members working in the European Union (EU). He also expressed his intention to halt the country's illegal deforestation and start the construction of motorways better connecting Romania and Moldova.

Simion also promised to bring at least one child from every Romanian locality to the city of Brussels to teach them about the workings of the EU and to donate three-quarters of his salary as a Member of the European Parliament (MEP) to projects in Romania or Moldova. In the election on 26 May, Simion got 117,141 votes, equivalent to 1.3 per cent of the votes in the election, failing to acquire a European Parliament seat.

=== Founding of AUR ===
On 19 September 2019, the Alliance for the Union of Romanians (AUR) was formally established, with Simion initially serving as one of the two co-presidents, alongside Claudiu Târziu. Later that year, on 1 December—Great Union Day, Romania's national holiday—Simion announced that AUR would contest both the 2020 local and parliamentary elections. In the local elections in September, the party won mayoral seats in three towns: Amara, Pufești, and Valea Lungă. Simion's national profile rose sharply following the December parliamentary elections, where AUR secured 9 per cent of the vote, making it the fourth-largest party in Parliament, despite being less than a year old at the time. The party's rapid rise was largely attributed to a social media campaign successful in galvanising support from key demographics. AUR especially drew a strong backing from the Romanian diaspora, particularly communities in Italy, Cyprus, France and Spain. Following the election, Simion faced criticism for having allowed two former military officers, Francisc Tobă and Nicolae Roman, to run and be elected for AUR, despite allegedly having participated in the repression of the Romanian Revolution of 1989.

In February 2022, following controversial statements by Georgescu regarding Corneliu Zelea Codreanu and Ion Antonescu, Simion renounced Georgescu's comments and reversed his proposal for Georgescu to be honorary president of AUR. On 27 March 2022, the first congress of AUR was held at the Palace of the Parliament. Simion ran to be voted in as party chairman, his only opponent being the then AUR deputy in the Constanța County Dănuț Aelenei. Aelenei stated that he only nominated himself to show that AUR was a democratic party. Simion got 784 votes while Aelenei received 38, resulting in Simion becoming the party's sole chairman, having previously shared this position with Târziu. In the June 2024 European Parliament election in Romania, AUR contested the election as part of the AUR Alliance, a strategic electoral coalition formed with several smaller parties. The alliance secured 15 per cent of the vote, translating into six seats, among those elected was Cristian Terheș.

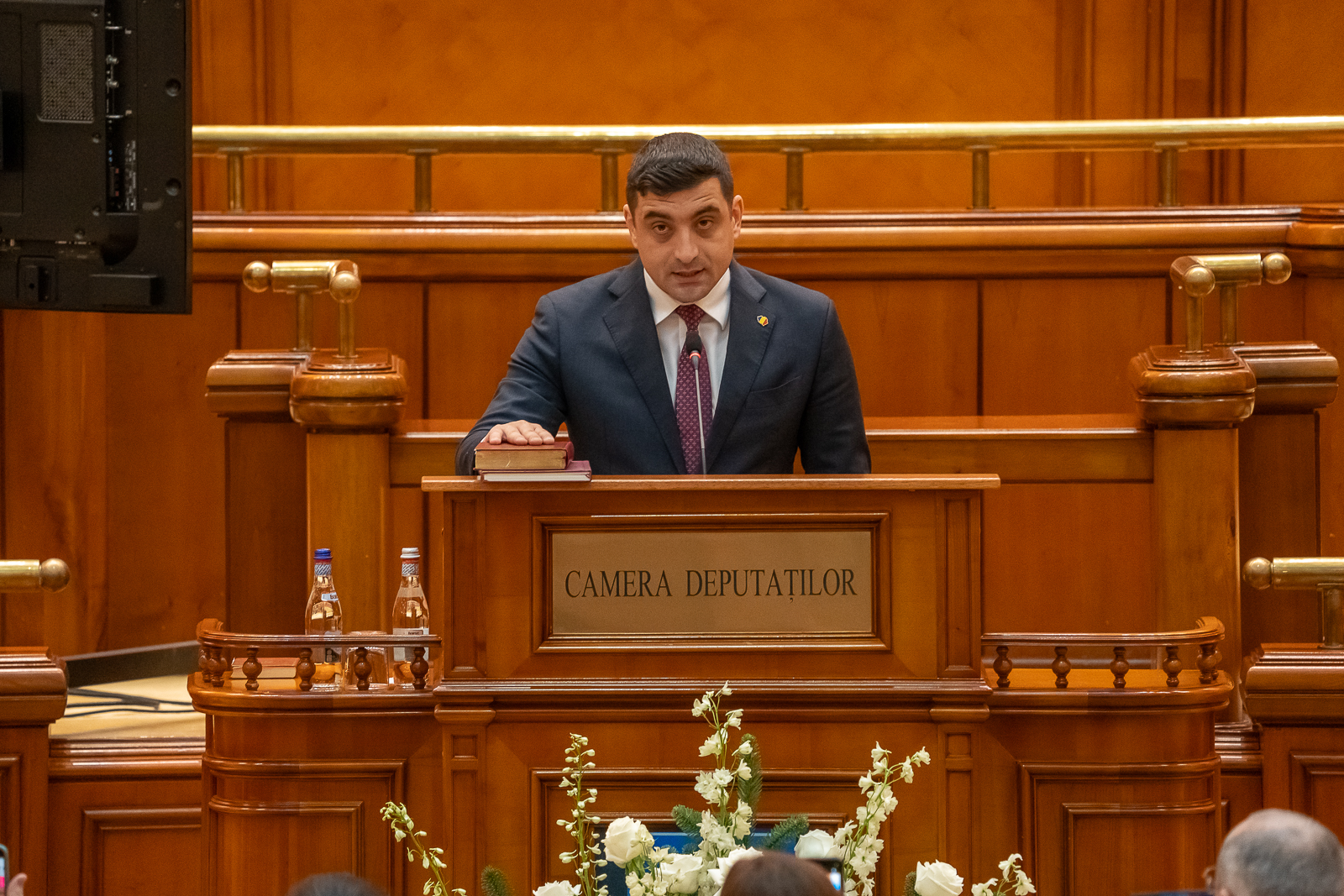
Simion taking the oath of office on 21 December 2024

In the 2024 parliamentary election on 1 December for the Senate and Chamber of Deputies, between the first and anticipated second round of the presidential election, Simion was re-elected deputy for his Bucharest seat, while his party became the second largest in both houses, with the incumbent National Coalition for Romania losing its majority. On 23 December, a new government was formed with AUR in opposition.

== Professional activity ==
Simion had a company founded in 2009, initially in the IT field. It turned into an online clothing store, and eventually into a physical one. In 2009, he also compiled a hip-hop album. In August 2024, Simion admitted to committing tax evasion when he sold branded clothing, ultras products, and firecrackers to football fans. Between 2012 and 2020, Simion worked as marketing director at Ideal Proiect Arhitecture & Design, a company of future party colleague, Marius Dorin Lulea.

== 2024 and 2025 presidential elections ==
=== 2024 ===
Simion stood in the 2024 Romanian presidential election, finishing fourth in the first round on 24 November with 13.9 per cent, behind independent candidate Călin Georgescu, USR candidate Elena Lasconi and Social Democratic prime minister Marcel Ciolacu. Georgescu, who Simion had endorsed for prime minister in 2020 and 2021, achieved a surprise victory in the first round with 22.9 per cent of the vote against USR candidate Elena Lasconi, with Simion announcing his endorsement of Georgescu for the second round on 8 December. However, two days before then, the Romanian Constitutional Court annulled the election results due to accusations of Russian interference. Simion criticised the ruling, framing it as a coup d'état orchestrated by the Romanian political elite.

=== 2025 ===
On 14 January 2025, he was elected vice-president of the European Conservatives and Reformists Party. For the 2025 elections, Simion was a key supporter of Georgescu along with POT leader and former AUR deputy Anamaria Gavrilă, stating that he would not stand were Georgescu permitted to. On 1 March, Simion organised a protest with tens of thousands of participants in Bucharest's University Square, stating that its objectives were to "restore democracy and free elections" and demand the resignation of prime minister Ciolacu. He also doubted the integrity of the upcoming electoral processes.

On 7 March 2025, Georgescu filed his candidacy for the election, with the Central Electoral Bureau (CEB) rejecting it two days later. After an appeal, a final ruling to bar Georgescu from the election was made on 11 March. At the time of his disqualification, Georgescu was leading in opinion polling.

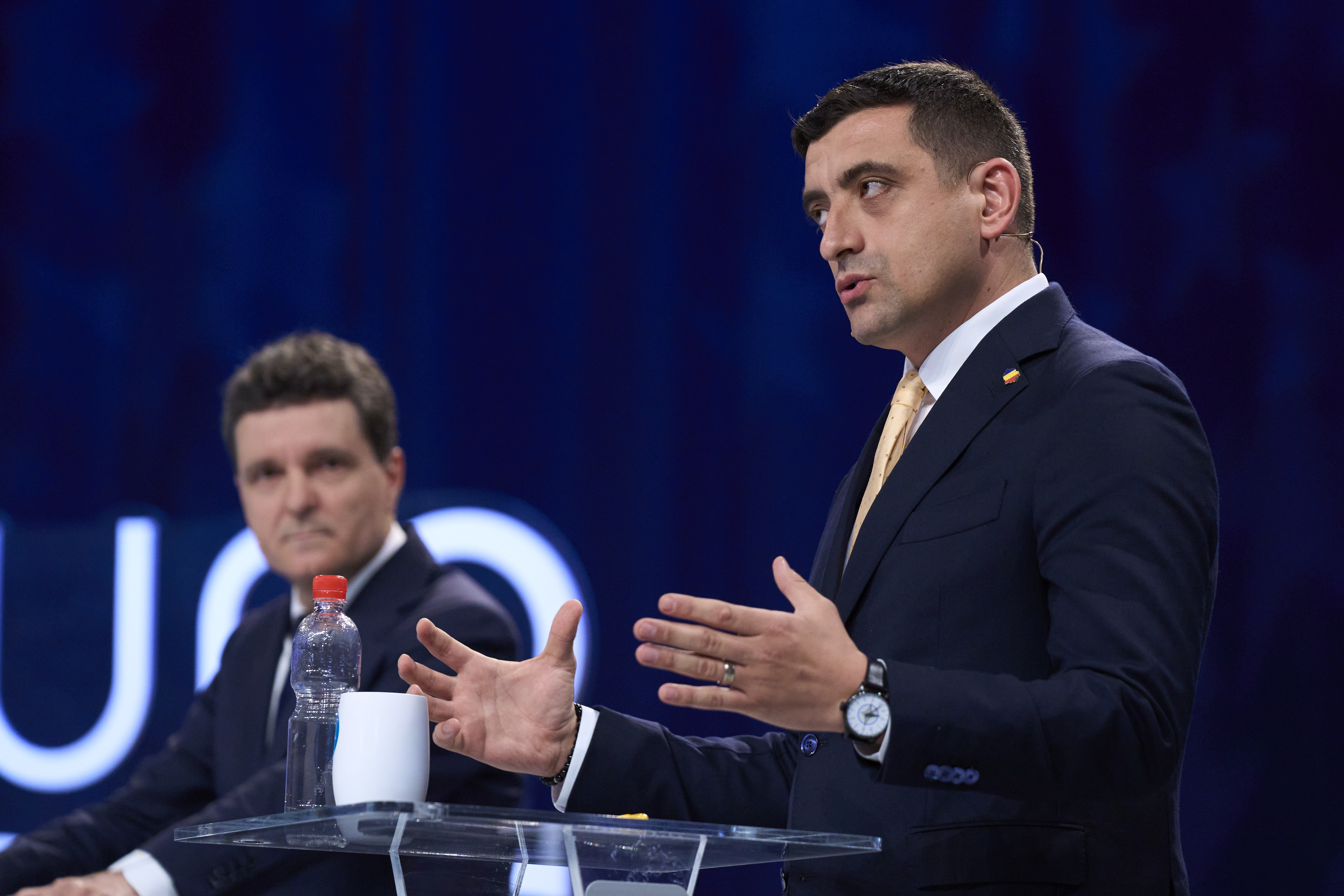
Simion with Nicușor Dan during a Euronews debate, 8 May 2025

Having announced to do so two days prior, Simion arrived to the CEB on 14 March accompanied by former Polish prime minister Mateusz Morawiecki to file his candidacy for president after collecting 604,000 signatures, above the minimum requirement of 200,000. The CEB approved his candidacy on the following day, which was also the deadline for candidates to register, with Simion stating "We passed the BEC, now let's see if we pass the CCR and return to democracy". The CCR validated his candidacy one day later as well as the ones of Nicușor Dan and Victor Ponta. Final confirmation that Simion would be allowed to run was given on 19 March, as the CCR rejected all appeals against his candidacy as well as those against Gavrilă. On the same day, Gavrilă withdrew her candidacy, endorsing Simion. A final list of all 11 candidates was released on the following day. On 22 March, a random draw placed Simion at the top of the candidate list on the ballot.

Simion led the first round of voting on 4 May with 41% of the vote. He lost to Nicușor Dan in a runoff on 18 May, having won 46.40% of the vote against Dan's 53.60%. Dan defeated Simion particularly among urban voters, women and ethnic minorities, notably Hungarians. Having previously conceded the election, Simion filed on 20 May a contest of the results to the CCR, alleging mass voter fraud. Two days later, the CCR official validated the election, with Dan being inaugurated president on 26 May.

== Post-2025 Romanian presidential election ==
On 1 June 2025, Simion congratulated Karol Nawrocki for his victory in the 2025 Polish presidential election. Two days later, Simion announced that Silvia Uscov, who had been head of the campaign's legal team, had joined AUR. The announcement came simultaneously with Dan Dungaciu and Andrei Gușă also joining the party.

== Political positions ==
=== Israel, the Holocaust and Palestine ===
In August 2023, Simion met with Israeli ambassador to Romania Reuven Azar and Israeli Likud politician Yossi Dagan, head of the Shomron Regional Council. At the meeting, Simion acknowledged and expressed regret about Romania's role in the Holocaust during World War II, promising to combat antisemitism and supported the expansion of Israeli settlements in the West Bank, emphasising what he described as "the historical right of the Jewish people to build and live in communities and cities in Judea and Samaria, the cradle of history of the Jewish people since the days of the Bible".

Simion opposes Holocaust education.

=== Gender equality ===
Simion in 2023 opposed the introduction of gender quotas in politics, stating that merit and preparation should prevail. He believed that in the last 30 years, the model of women in politics has been one of the easy woman, the mistress, and more recently, "the model of the street woman". Simion found the abortion legislation in 2024 to be sufficient, however, he did not regard the right to abortion as a fundamental human right and implicitly a constitutional right. In his opinion, doctors who refuse to perform abortions should not be compelled.

=== LGBT people ===
A 2024 report by ILGA-Europe stated that, "In July, MP George Simion shared a social media post to say that LGBTQI people are to blame for the weather conditions, which are divine punishment."

Simion strongly opposes same-sex marriage.

=== Hungarians in Romania ===
As an activist, Simion played a significant role in the Valea Uzului ethnic conflict in 2019. During the presidential election campaign, Simion struck a conciliatory tone towards Hungarians in Romania. He called the UDMR a serious political partner and stated that he follow in Viktor Orbán's footsteps in many respects. Simion described the UDMR in 2024 as "a hideous, chauvinistic creature", adding that the AUR has ethnic Hungarian members and "we do not need ethnic formations in a unitary, sovereign and independent country".

=== European Union ===
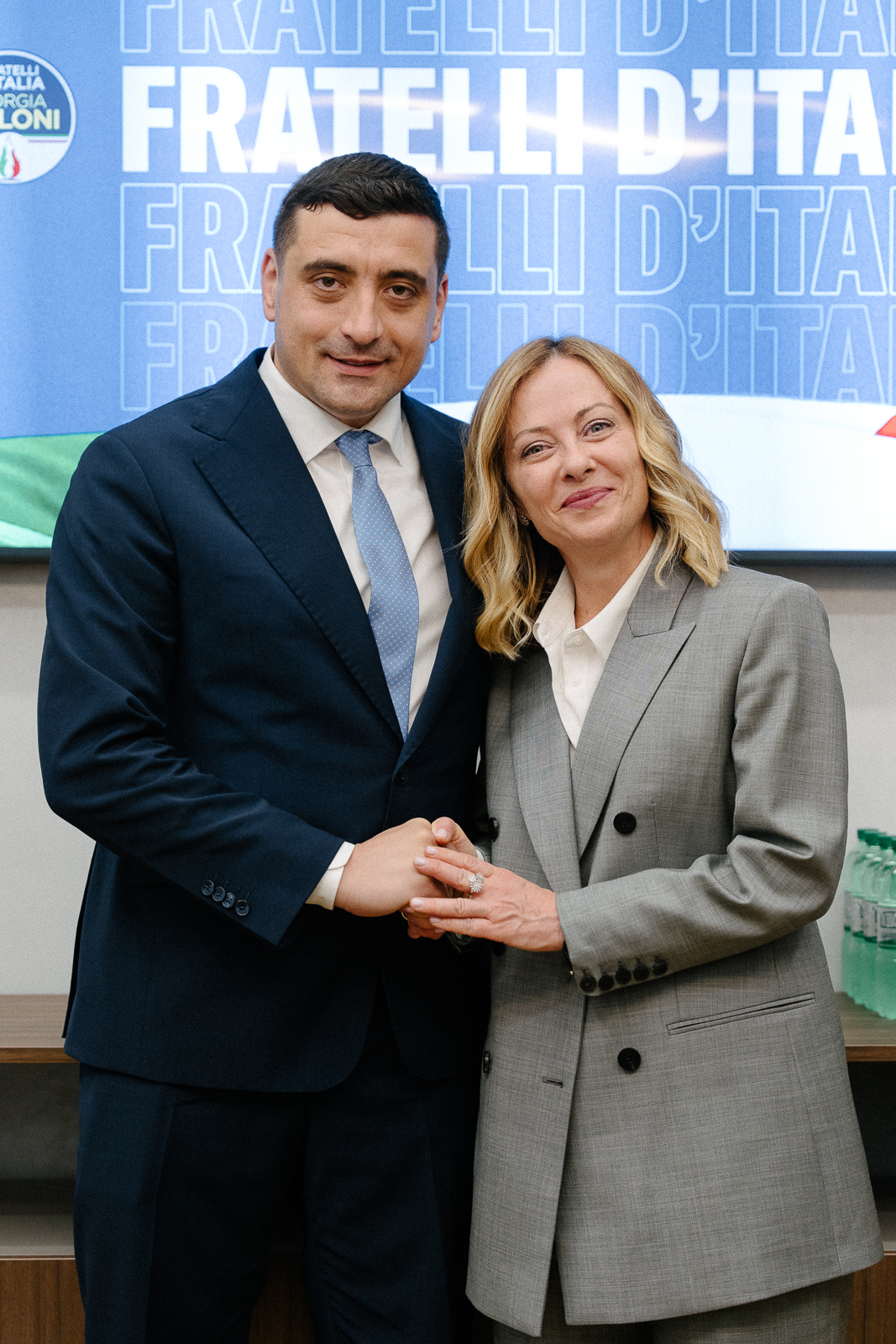
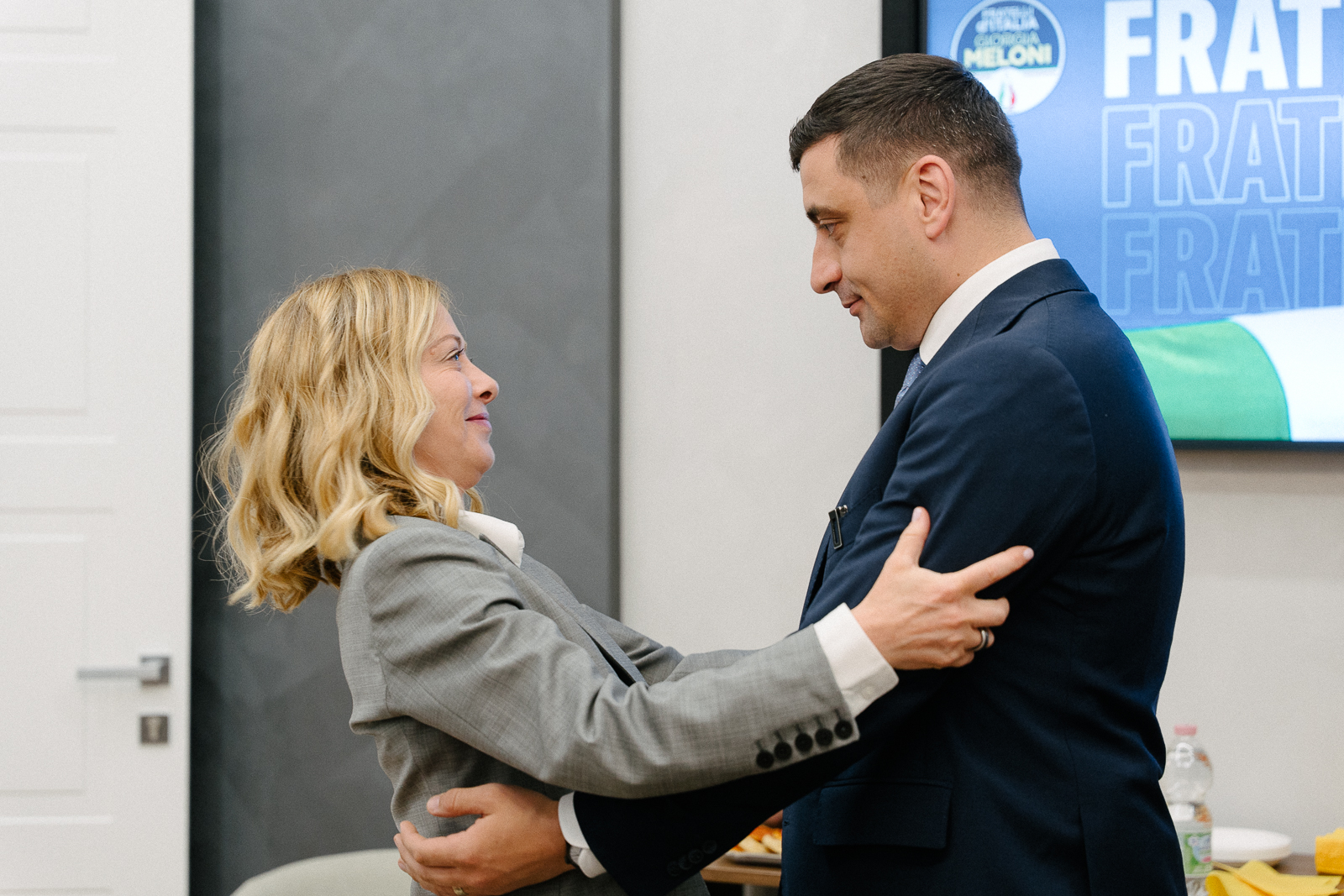
Simion with Giorgia Meloni in May 2025

On 15 May 2025, Simion said: "We're a Eurorealist group, not Eurosceptic!", adding that he embraced the European single market as a driver of wealth for Romanians. Among leading politicians in EU member states, he has expressed particular admiration for Italian prime minister Giorgia Meloni, having praised the "Melonisation" of Europe. On 14 January 2025, he was elected the vice leader of the ECR party, with Mateusz Morawiecki as leader.

=== Russia and Ukraine ===
In a December 2020 interview to Radio Europa Liberă România, during the chancellorship of Angela Merkel, Simion warned about external influences on Romania, particularly from Russia, describing the "friendship" between Russia and Germany as a danger to Romania. Following the Russian invasion of Ukraine, Simion called Russian president Vladimir Putin a war criminal and said that international sanctions against Russia "were not enough".

On 18 November 2024, the Security Service of Ukraine imposed a three-year entry ban on Simion for "systematic anti-Ukrainian activities". Simion refuted these allegations, asserting that his prohibition was due to his "pro-Romanian activities" and advocacy for the rights of the Romanian minority in Ukraine. On 22 November 2024, following the election of Donald Trump as U.S. president, Simion expressed opposition to additional military aid to Ukraine, aligning with Trump's stances and advocated for a negotiated end to Russo-Ukrainian War, which had escalated following the full-scale Russian invasion of Ukraine in February 2022.

In March 2025, Simion elaborated to the Financial Times:

"Putin's Russia was and is one of the biggest threats for the European states, especially for us, for the Baltic states and for Poland". We need unity, but not just in Europe: also between Europe and the United States, we need the same approach"

— George Simion, 17 March 2025

In May 2025, Simion stated that he did not believe Russia was a significant threat to NATO, as "Russia doesn't have the potential to represent a significant threat to the biggest military alliance in the world", stating that the only risk to the eastern flank of NATO was the alliance's own dismantling.

=== Moldovan–Romanian unification ===
According to the party's website, AUR's ultimate goal is to achieve the unification of all Romanians "wherever they are located, in Bucharest, Iași, Timișoara, Cernăuți, Timoc, Italy or Spain". It has four self-described pillars: family, nation, Christian faith, and liberty. AUR supports the unification of Moldova and Romania and has been accused of being ultranationalist, far-right, opposed to same-sex marriage, anti-mask, anti-vaccine and Magyarophobic. In March 2025, Simion acknowledged that the reunification between Romania and Moldova was his party's long-time goal, although it would only be achieved under international settlements and if both populations voted for such a move in referendums. Moldova became part of the modern state of Romania in 1918, but was taken by the Soviet Union in 1940. In his 2017 book Blocați în labirint, Simion describes the reunification of Romania and Moldova as a "historical imperative", characterising the division between them as serving external geopolitical interests rather than Romanian national interests". Commenting on the 2018 unification declarations, Simion said he was satisfied with the scale that the unification declarations had reached and with the general enthusiasm of many Moldovan mayors, who "continue to show pride in being part of the Romanian nation".

=== Poland ===
On 20 January 2021, Simion met with Janusz Kowalski, state secretary of the Polish Ministry of State Assets, and with Radosław Fogiel, advisor of Law and Justice party leader Jarosław Kaczyński, in Warsaw. They talked about the situation of strategic state-owned companies and a bill against Internet censorship. Simion gifted Fogiel a map of Greater Romania. On 21 January, the co-president of AUR met in Brussels with conservative MEPs, where they talked about the European mobility package, the European Green Deal, the implementation of a "vaccine passport" and Big Tech censorship. Following the meetings, on 22 January, Simion announced that AUR would affiliate itself with the "European political family of conservatives and reformists".

=== United States ===
Simion took part in the second inauguration of Donald Trump on 20 January 2025 in Washington, D.C. In February of that year, Simion participated in the Conservative Political Action Conference (CPAC) in Maryland, engaging with international conservative figures such as Steve Bannon, Richard Grenell, Eduardo Bolsonaro and Nigel Farage.

In an April 2025 interview with Politico, Simion stated, "We are natural allies of the Republican Party and we are almost perfectly aligned ideologically with the MAGA movement".

Simion is both a fan and an admirer of Trump.

== Personal life ==
As of 2025, Simion claimed to live in a 52 square metre studio flat in Bucharest, purportingly donating 90% of his salary from parliamentary employment to civic causes, related to Romania or Romanians. It was reported in May 2025 that the apartment he lives in is actually 238 square metres and he does not pay rent. In his financial disclosure for the 2025 presidential election, Simion ranked among the candidates with the least personal assets.

On 27 August 2022, he married 24-year-old Ilinca Munteanu at a public Orthodox ceremony in Commune Măciuca, Vâlcea. The wedding ceremony couple's traditional outfit drew comparisons to the wedding of far-right politician and charismatic leader of the religious fascist Iron Guard, Corneliu Zelea Codreanu.

On 24 April 2024, Ilinca gave birth to the couple's first child, a boy named Radu, who was baptised in Gura Humorului on 5 July, with a private party with around a 1,000 guests on the following day.

== Bibliography ==
Simion has authored two books. His first book, Blocați în labirint ("Stuck in the Maze"), examines the evolution of the Republic of Moldova from its independence around 1991 during the collapse of the Soviet Union until 2017.

In 2019, he published his second book, Cum i-am cunoscut ("How I met them"), which recounts his encounters with prominent Romanian politicians—such as presidents Ion Iliescu, Traian Băsescu and Klaus Iohannis—and analyses the political, economic, and social landscape in Romania over the previous 30 years.

== Electoral history ==
=== 2019 European Parliament election (Romania) ===
The results were the following:

Election	Affiliation			
Election	Affiliation	Votes	Percentage	Position
2019	Independent	117,141	1.29%	9th

=== Presidential elections ===
Simion ran in the 2024 Romanian presidential election but failed to advance in the first round of voting on 24 November after placing fourth.

Election	Affiliation	First round			Second round		
Election	Affiliation	Votes	Percentage	Position	Votes	Percentage	Position
2024	AUR	1,281,327	13.86%	4th	N/A		
2025	AUR	3,862,761	40.96%	1st	5,339,053	46.40%	2nd
