= Crăiești =

- Commune
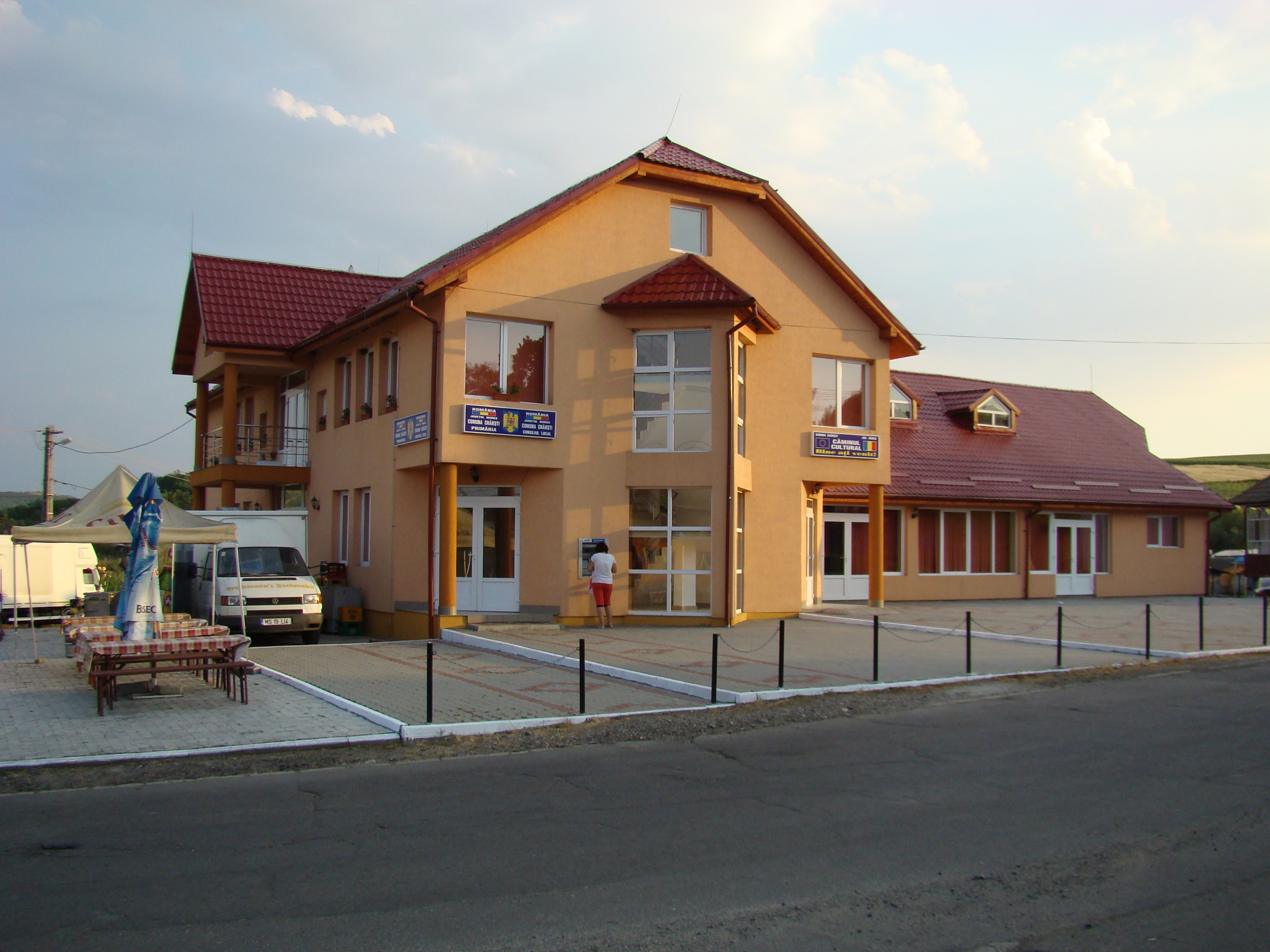
- Crăiești town hall

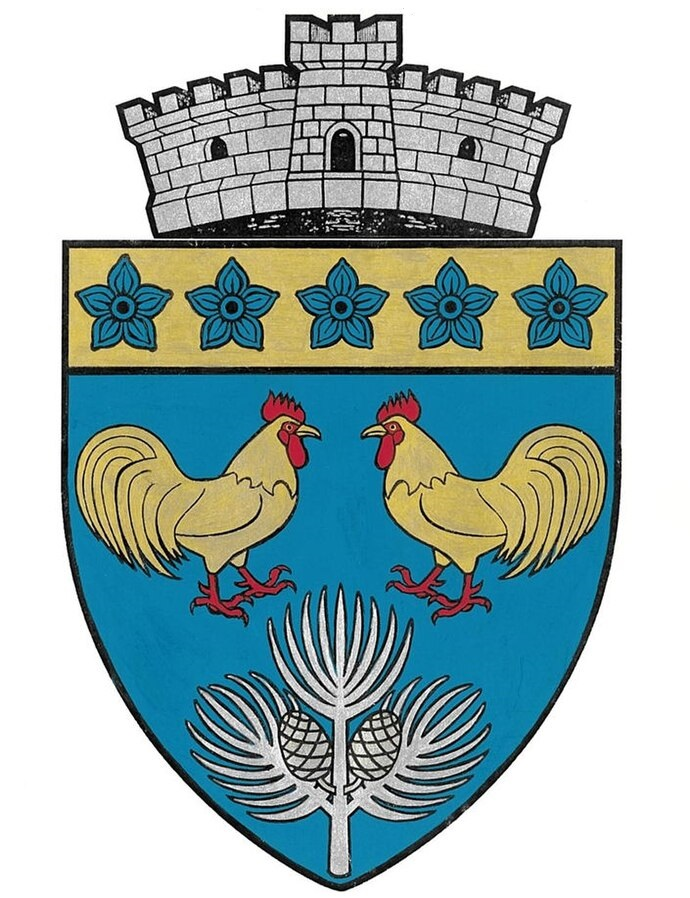
- Coat of arms

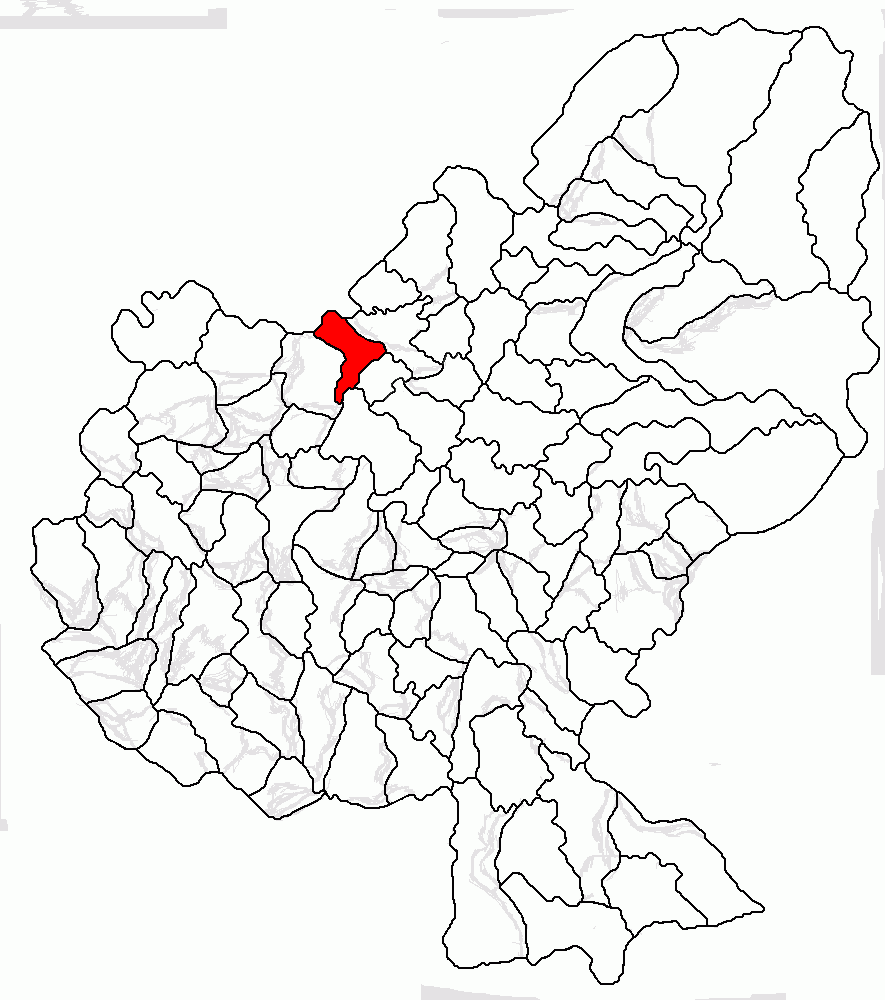
- Location in Mureș County

- Location in Romania
- Coordinates: 46°45′N 24°25′E
- Country: Romania
- County: Mureș

Government
  - Mayor (2024–2028): Vasile Vereș (PNL)
- Area: 23.49 km^{2} (9.07 sq mi)
- Elevation: 348 m (1,142 ft)
- Population (2021-12-01): 755
  - Density: 32.1/km^{2} (83.2/sq mi)
- Time zone: UTC+02:00 (EET)
  - Summer (DST): UTC+03:00 (EEST)
- Postal code: 547180
- Area code: (+40) 0265
- Vehicle reg.: MS
- Website: www.primariacraiesti.ro

Crăiești (Hungarian: Mezőkirályfalva, Hungarian pronunciation: [mɛzøːkiraːjfɒlvɒ]) is a commune in Mureș County, Transylvania, Romania. It is composed of four villages: Crăiești, Lefaia (Lefája), Milășel (Kisnyulas), and Nima Milășelului (Kisnyulasi Néma).

At the 2021 census, the commune had a population of 924; of those, 90.46% were Romanians and 2.65% Roma.

== See also ==
- List of Hungarian exonyms (Mureș County)
