= Dan Dungaciu =

Romanian sociologist (born 1968)

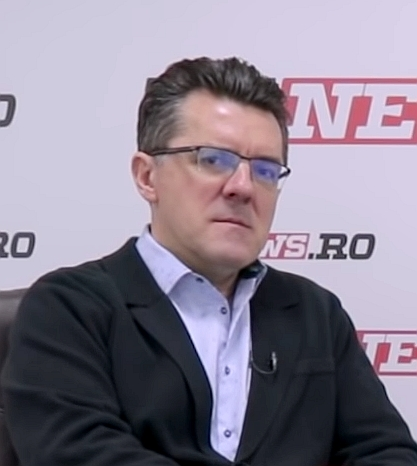
- Dungaciu in 2019
- Born: 3 October 1968 (age 57); Târgu Mureș, Socialist Republic of Romania
- Citizenship: Romania; Moldova
- Education: University of Bucharest
- Employer: University of Bucharest
- Known for: Expert on Moldova
- Spouse: Stela Popa
- Awards: Order of Honour (Moldova)

Dan Gheorghe Dungaciu (born 3 October 1968) is a Romanian sociologist and geopolitician.

== Biography ==
He was born in Târgu Mureș. He graduated from the University of Bucharest in 1995 and received his Ph.D. in 2002. He is a professor at the Faculty of Sociology and Social Work of the University of Bucharest and director of the Institute of Political Sciences and International Relations of the Romanian Academy. He served as Secretary of State in the Ministry of Foreign Affairs of Romania.

In 2024, Dungaciu was indicted by the DNA (National Anticorruption Directorate) for abuse of office.

On 2 June 2025, George Simion announced Dungaciu as the new foreign relations consultant for the Alliance for the Union of Romanians political party (AUR).

== On Moldova ==
Dungaciu is a supporter of the Romanian language in the Republic of Moldova. In 2022 he wrote that the Chișinău Government can introduce the Romanian language into the Constitution of the Republic of Moldova without a vote in Parliament.

Dungaciu has been a supporter of Moldovan President Maia Sandu and has accurately predicted that her party would get a good result in the early elections of 2021. Dungaciu characterised Maia Sandu as a winner and affirmed that Sandu would be capable of calling early elections.

== Awards ==
Dan Dungaciu is laureate of the Dimitrie Gusti prize for sociology offered by the Romanian Academy (1995) and the International Prize for Sociology of Istanbul University (2001). In 2009, the interim President of Moldova, Mihai Ghimpu, signed a decree on bestowing the Order of Honour on Dungaciu.

== Political activity ==
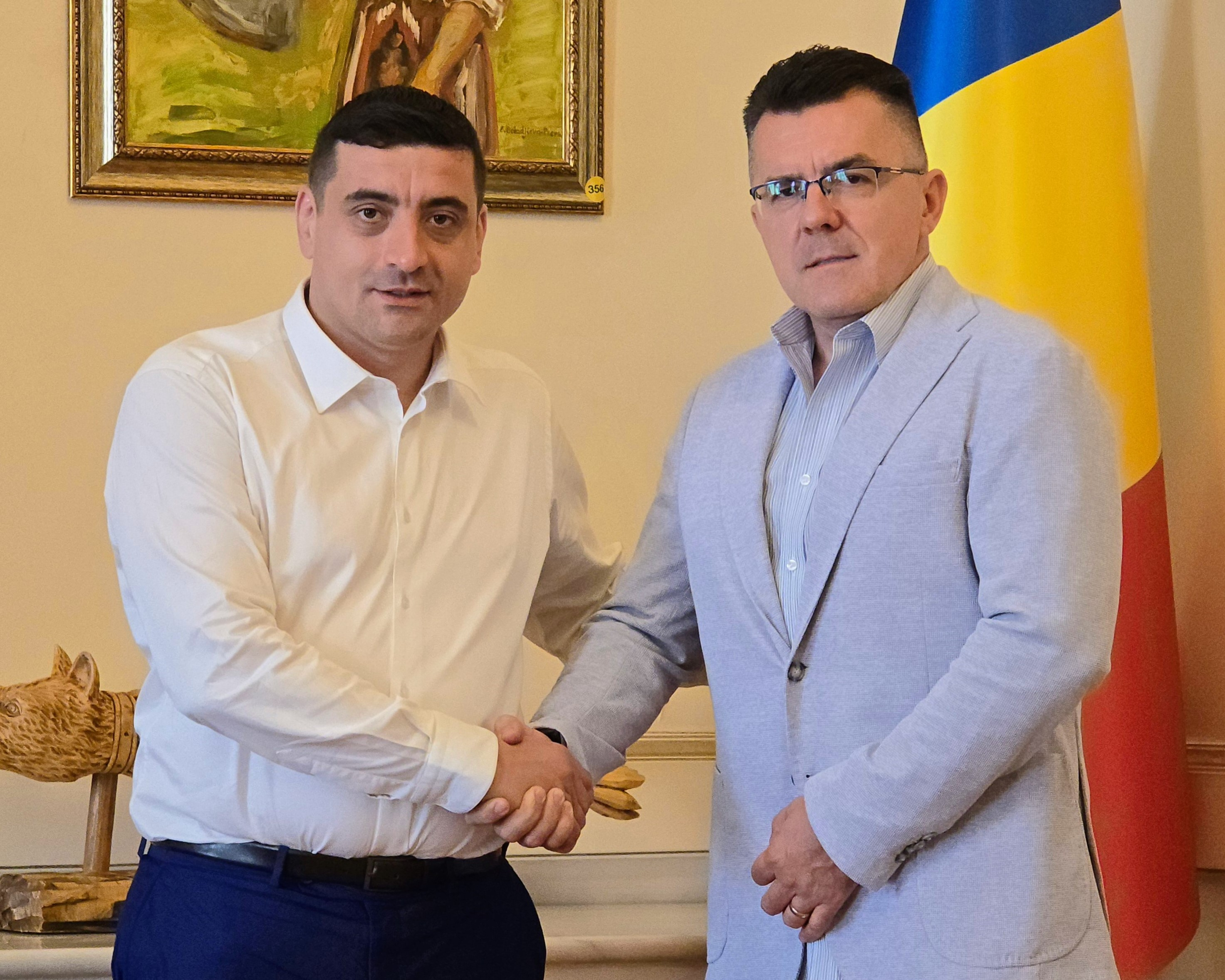
Dungaciu with Simion in the Romanian Parliament, 2 June 2025

On 2 June 2025, George Simion announced Dungaciu as the foreign relations consultant of the Alliance for the Unity of Romanians (AUR) party. The announcement came at the same time as Silvia Uscov and Andrei Gușă joined AUR.

== Private life ==
Dungaciu obtained Moldovan citizenship on 16 July 2010, when he became an advisor for European Integration for president Mihai Ghimpu. He married Moldovan journalist Stela Popa in October 2012. His wife is a Romanian from the Republic of Moldova.

== Works ==
- Bădescu, Ilie; Cristea, Sandra; Dungaciu, Dan Gheorghe, eds. (1995). Sociologia și geopolitica frontierei (2 vols.). București: Editura Floarea Albastră. ISBN 978-973-97305-1-8. OCLC 895593784.
- Bădescu, Ilie; Dungaciu, Dan; Baltasiu, Radu (1996). Istoria sociologiei. Teorii contemporane. București: Editura Eminescu. ISBN 9789732205181. OCLC 40923977.
- Dungaciu, Dan (1997). "Rețelele omeniei" și rețelele mistificării. Colecția Nexus. București: Editura Romanitatea Orientală. ISBN 978-973-97951-2-8. OCLC 895640402.
- Enciclopedia valorilor reprimate, 2 volume, 2000 (coauthor)
- Statul și comunitatea morală. Memorii (1904–1910), Traian Brăileanu, (ediție îngrijită, studiu introductiv și repere bibliografice de Dan Dungaciu), 2002.
- Sociologia românească interbelică în context european, 2002.
- Națiunea și provocările (post)modernității, 2002.
- Dungaciu, Dan (2005). Moldova ante portas. Studii de securitate. București: Tritonic. ISBN 978-973-733-045-1. OCLC 75968430.
- Dungaciu, Dan Gheorghe (2009). Cine suntem noi? cronici de la Est de Vest. Cartier istoric (Ediția I ed.). Chișinău: Editura Cartier. ISBN 978-9975-79-539-5. OCLC 895459327.
- Dungaciu, Dan; Iordache, Ruxandra, eds. (2017). The perfect storm of the European crisis. Newcastle upon Tyne, England: Cambridge Scholars Publishing. ISBN 978-1-4438-7360-4. OCLC 992307047.
- Dungaciu, Dan, ed. (2020). The geopolitical Black Sea Encyclopaedia. Newcastle upon Tyne, England: Cambridge Scholars Publishing. ISBN 978-1-5275-5806-9. OCLC 1195824346.
