= Claudiu Târziu =

Romanian politician (born 1973)

Claudiu Târziu MEP
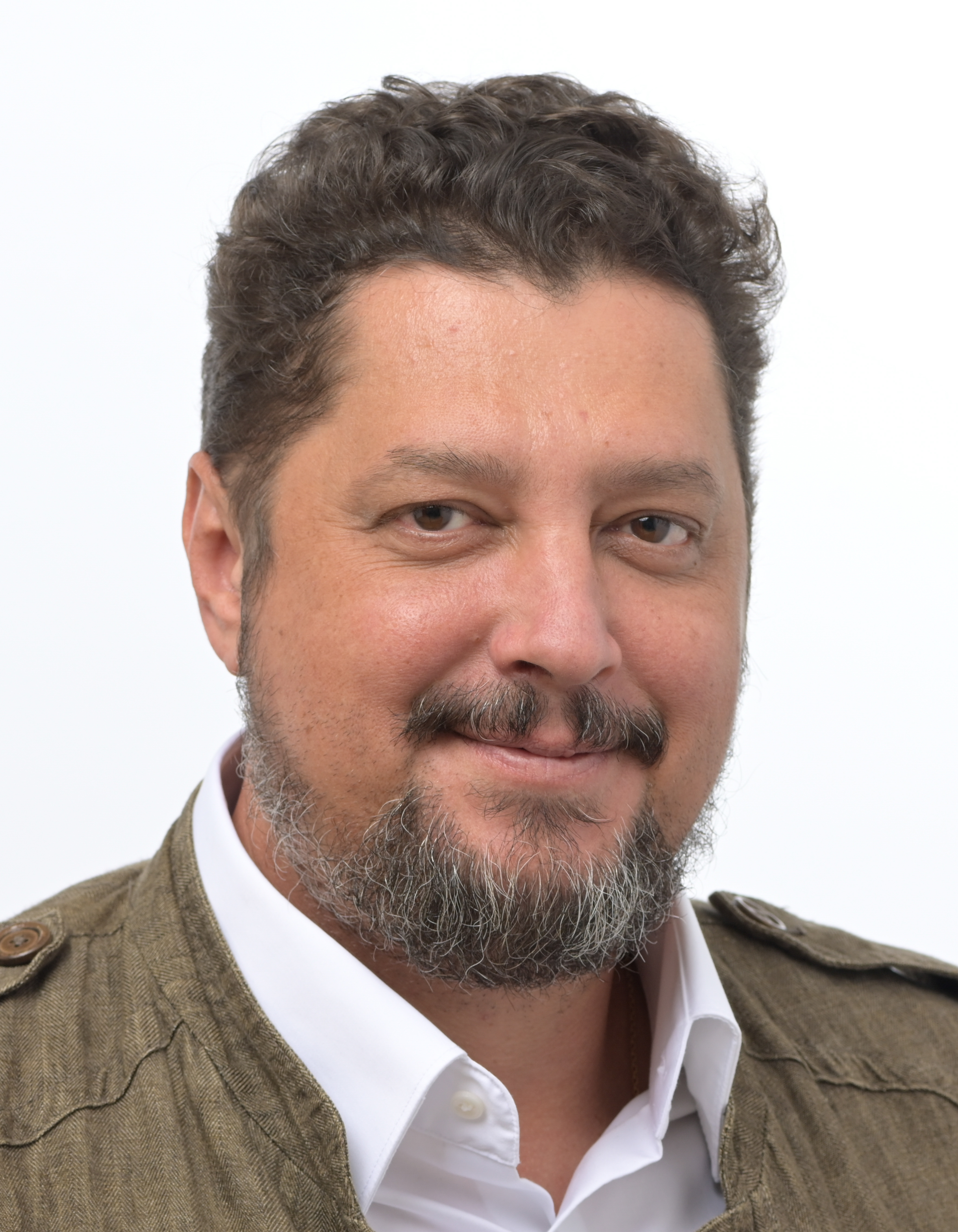
- Official portrait, 2024

Member of the European Parliament for Romania
- Incumbent
- Assumed office 16 July 2024

Member of the Senate of Romania
- In office 21 December 2020 – 15 July 2024
- Constituency: Bucharest

Co-president of the Alliance for the Union of Romanians
- In office 1 December 2019 – 27 March 2022 Serving with George Simion

Personal details
- Born: 20 February 1973 (age 53) Bacău, Bacău County, Romania
- Party: Conservative Action (since 2025)
- Other political affiliations: Alliance for the Union of Romanians (2019–2025)
- Spouse: Adela Ioana Grăjdeanu Târziu
- Children: 2
- Education: Mihai Eminescu University, Iași; National University of Political Studies and Public Administration
- Occupation: Journalist, politician
- Religion: Romanian Orthodox
- Website: claudiutarziu.ro

Claudiu Richard Târziu (born 20 February 1973) is a Romanian right-wing politician and journalist. Together with George Simion, he was the co-president of the Alliance for the Union of Romanians (AUR), a political party in Romania that gained popularity after its unexpected high score in the 2020 Romanian legislative election, until 27 March 2022, when Simion was elected as the party's sole president. Târziu remained a member of the party, being the president of its National Leadership Council (CNC), until his departure from AUR on 9 April 2025. On 7 May that year, he became the president of the newly-founded Conservative Action (ACT) party.

== Biography ==
Claudiu Târziu was born on 20 February 1973 in Bacău, Romania. He graduated from the Anghel Saligny Lyceum of Bacău in 1991 and studied from 1994 to 1999 at the Faculty of Law of the Mihai Eminescu University of Iași. From 2002 to 2007, Târziu studied at the National University of Political Studies and Public Administration of Bucharest.

According to his curriculum vitae, he is since April 2012 the marketing director of SC Cosânzeana Edit Pres SRL and since November 2013 the director of the publishing house Rost. The latter was presented as "a magazine for the national and Christian resurrection", and figures of the Iron Guard, a former fascist party of Romania, were promoted on its pages. His CV also says that he has been an investigative journalist, a "special reporter", an editor-in-chief and a publishing house director. Târziu was also member of the association Coaliția pentru Familie.

On 19 September 2019, the Romanian political party Alliance for the Union of Romanians (AUR) was formally created. Later, on 1 December, during the Great Union Day of Romania, George Simion, one of its co-founders, said the AUR intended to run in the 2020 Romanian local and legislative elections of the country. At the time, Târziu was the other co-president of the AUR, a party which supports the unification of Moldova and Romania and has been defined as ultranationalist, far-right, opposed to same-sex marriage, anti-mask and anti-vaccine, among others.

Târziu was the candidate of the AUR in the 2020 local elections of Romania in the city of Bucharest. He received 0.67% of the votes, getting the 7th place and being behind the political coalition Pro Bucharest 2020 and in front of the Greater Romania Party. A few months later, in the 2020 legislative election of the country, the AUR boosted its popularity after obtaining 9% of the votes, becoming Romania's fourth-largest party despite having been created just over a year ago at the time.

On 27 March 2022, on the first congress of the AUR, Simion was elected as the party's only president after having previously shared leadership with Târziu. For his part, following the congress, Târziu became the leader of the AUR's National Leadership Council (CNC). He was suspended from this position on 4 April 2025, and Târziu left the party on 9 April. On 7 May, he became president of the newly-founded Conservative Action (ACT) party.

Claudiu Târziu has a wife, Adela Ioana Grăjdeanu Târziu, who was AUR's main candidate for the Senate in Bacău County during the 2020 legislative election. He also has two children and currently lives in Bucharest.

== Ideology ==
Târziu is an Orthodox Christian and has expressed harsh views on homosexuality. He is also against abortion and has described the Legionnaires (members or followers of the Iron Guard and its policies) as "the first to be aware of the communist danger" and that "they had the power of sacrifice, due to their faith in Christ". He has expressed admiration for Corneliu Zelea Codreanu, founder of the Iron Guard. Târziu also identifies himself as a monarchist.

In 2024, on the Day of the Unification of the Romanian Principalities and as the Russian invasion of Ukraine was taking place, Târziu gave a revisionist speech in which he called on Romania to annex Bessarabia (a divided region comprising most of Moldova and parts of Ukraine) including Ukraine's Southern Bessarabia as well as the Ukrainian regions of Northern Bukovina, the Hertsa region, and Transcarpathia.

== Electoral history ==
=== Mayor of Bucharest ===
The results were the following:

Election	Affiliation	First round		
Election	Affiliation	Votes	Percentage	Position
2020	AUR	4,445	0.67%	7th
