= Valea Uzului ethnic conflict =

Ethnic clash in Romania between Hungarians and Romanians in 2019

The Valea Uzului ethnic conflict refers to an incident between Hungarians and Romanians in a military cemetery at the unpopulated village of Valea Uzului (Hungarian: Úzvölgye; sometimes "Uz Valley" in English) in Székely Land, Transylvania, Romania, that took place in 2019.

== Background ==
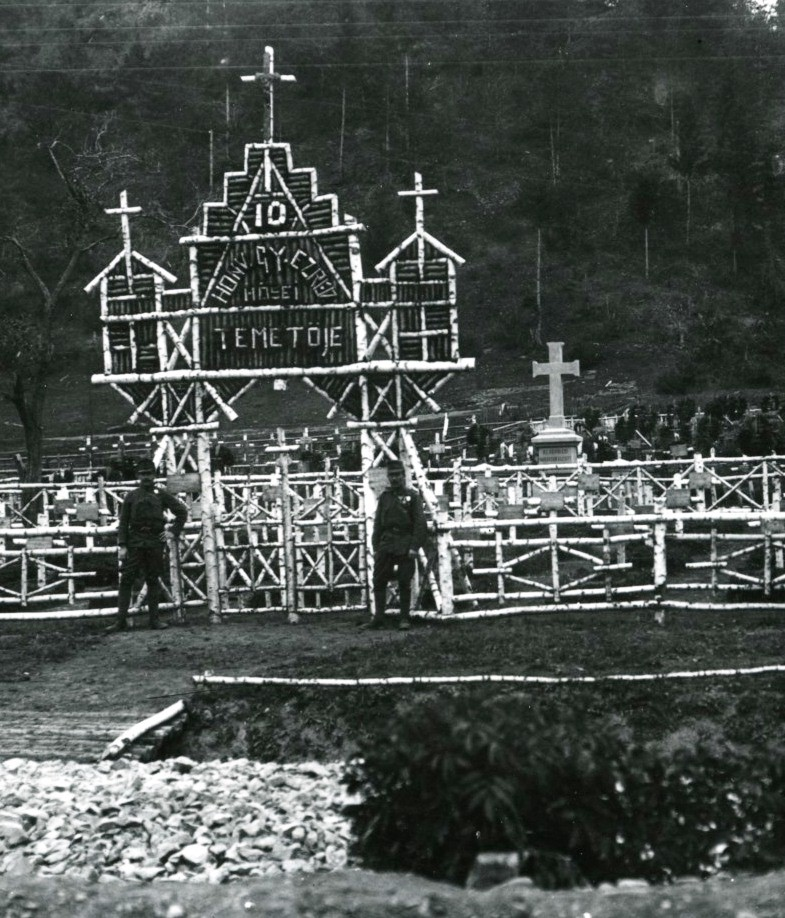
The cemetery at Úzvölgye (now Valea Uzului) of the 10th Royal Hungarian Honvéd Infantry Regiment of Miskolc (1916–1918)

The valley was the site of significant battles during World Wars I and II, and the now-deserted village of Valea Uzului (Hungarian: Úzvölgye) is located there. When the region was part of the Kingdom of Hungary, the cemetery was established in 1917 by Austrians and Hungarians as the burial place for the fallen soldiers of WWI battles, and has also been used during WWII for the same purpose.

=== World War I and the establishment of the military cemetery ===
On 27 August 1916, the Kingdom of Romania declared war on Austria-Hungary, and the first Romanian units crossed the Hungarian border that night. In the Úzvölgye (Uz Valley) area, only a single company of the Hungarian 61st Honvéd Infantry Division was stationed. Austria-Hungary's German ally also entered the operations, and as a result, by 14 October troops of the Romanian Royal Army had been driven out of the territory of the Kingdom of Hungary. From Galicia, units of the 39th Royal Hungarian Honvéd Infantry Division (9th Honvéd Infantry Regiment of Kassa, 10th Honvéd Infantry Regiment of Miskolc, 11th Honvéd Infantry Regiment of Munkács, 16th Honvéd Infantry Regiment of Besztercebánya) were ordered to Transylvania to take part in the ongoing operations. On 15 October, they replaced the Austro-Hungarian 1st Cavalry Division, which had been pursuing Romanian forces. The Hungarian Honvéd units crossed the Romanian border, launching an offensive toward Dărmănești. In the narrow Úzvölgye area, Romanian forces put up determined resistance, and both sides suffered heavy casualties. Hungarian forces continued their offensive until 24 October but failed to capture Dărmănești. On the same day, reinforced Romanian troops pushed the exhausted Hungarian units back to the Hungarian–Romanian border. Hostilities intensified again in November. By that time, on this sector of the front, Romanian troops had been completely replaced by Russian forces, and Hungarian units, together with German troops, faced Russian attacks. After March 1917, no further major operations took place in this sector. On 3 March 1918, the Central Powers signed the Treaty of Brest-Litovsk with Russia. On 5 March 1918, Germany concluded a preliminary peace with Romania, followed by the signing of the Treaty of Bucharest on 7 May.

During the autumn fighting that began in October 1916, the fallen Hungarian soldiers had to be buried as quickly as possible. The front line later stabilized along the Hungarian–Romanian border. The cemetery established in Úzvölgye, on the territory of Hungary, was used to bury soldiers of the 39th Royal Hungarian Honvéd Infantry Division. Later, the military cemetery also became the burial site for fallen soldiers of the allied German forces.

== Ethnic conflict ==
Although the area was assigned to Harghita County when it was established in 1968, that same year, the county's communist leaders handed over the cemetery in the Valea Uzului — along with the Hungarian border guard barracks built in 1942 — to Bacău County for ten years of use. Despite the 10 years having long expired, Bacău County began considering the area its own. This ultimately led the local government of the commune of Dărmănești in the county to feel entitled to transform the military cemetery in Valea Uzului without permission in spring 2019. The local council in Dărmănești, a town of 8,600 inhabitants, which does not have jurisdiction over the cemetery, began a so-called "renovation" on the cemetery grounds, erecting concrete crosses and a memorial to Romanian soldiers that were in fact buried in a neglected cemetery near the neighbouring former village of Poiana Uzului. The council of Dărmănești, however, scheduled the inauguration of the newly and illegally erected Romanian war memorial.

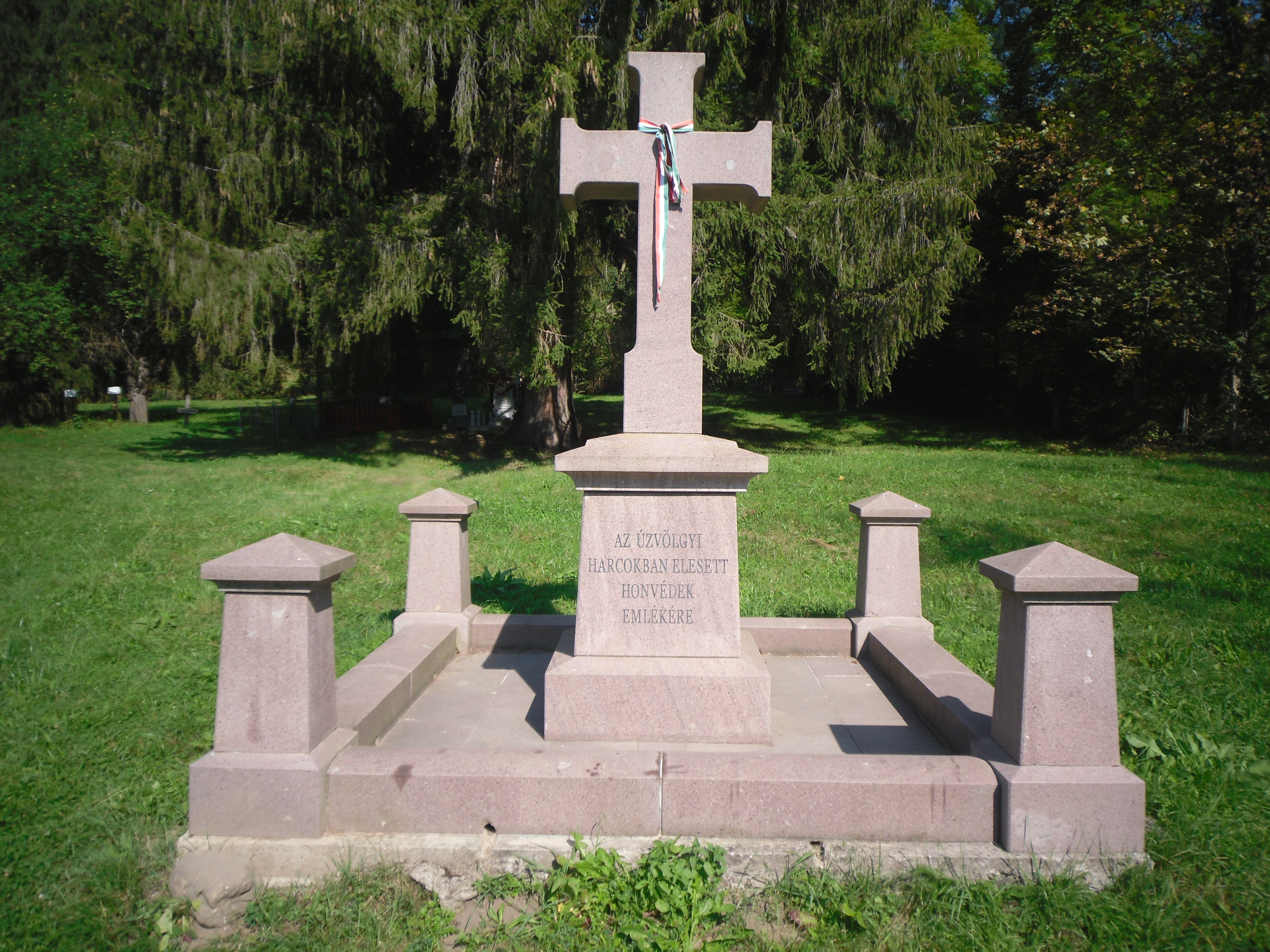
The Hungarian monument "In memory of the Honvéd soldiers who fell in the battles of Úzvölgy"

In June 2019, a Romanian crowd broke into the former Austro-Hungarian military cemetery in Valea Uzului, behaving aggressively with the Hungarians forming a human chain who were praying there peacefully, then breaking the gate of the cemetery and consecrating crosses for Romanian soldiers who actually were not buried there. Despite police presence, several from the Romanian crowd eventually broke through the police cordon and the fence and tore open the cemetery gate. Some members of the Hungarian group were physically attacked and injured. The Romanians also desecrated Hungarian graves. The Romanian Ministry of Culture and Ministry of Defense stated that only they had the right to make reconstructions or changes in the cemetery, and that they had not granted anyone permission to erect memorials or crosses there in 2019, thus the action of the Romanians was illegal. Romanian court decisions determined that only one Hungarian citizen of Romanian ethnicity was buried there (a member of Royal Hungarian Honvéd), the others being mainly Hungarians, ordering the removal of the illegally installed Romanian crosses.

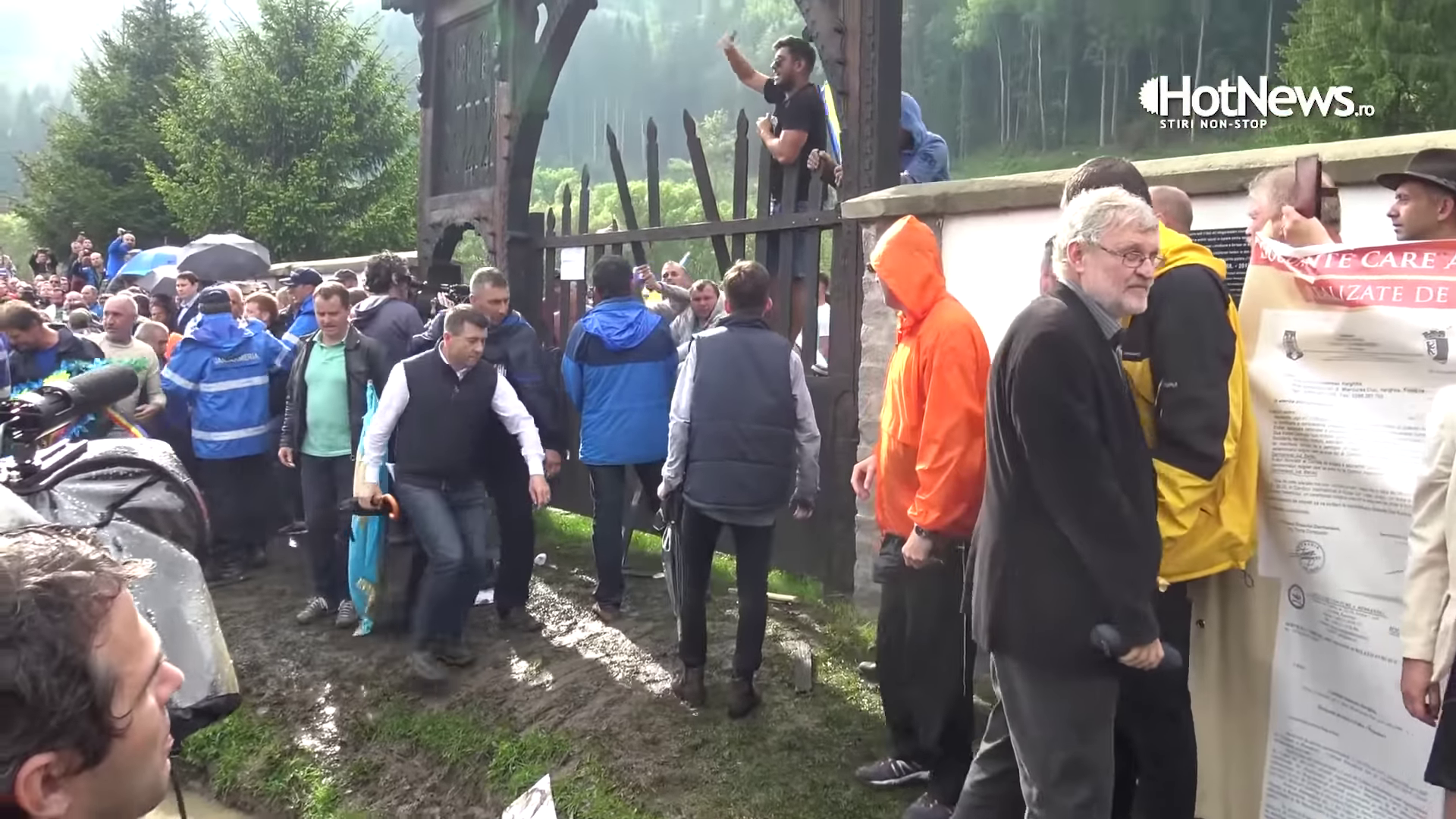
Romanians storming the cemetery, and its gate broken by them

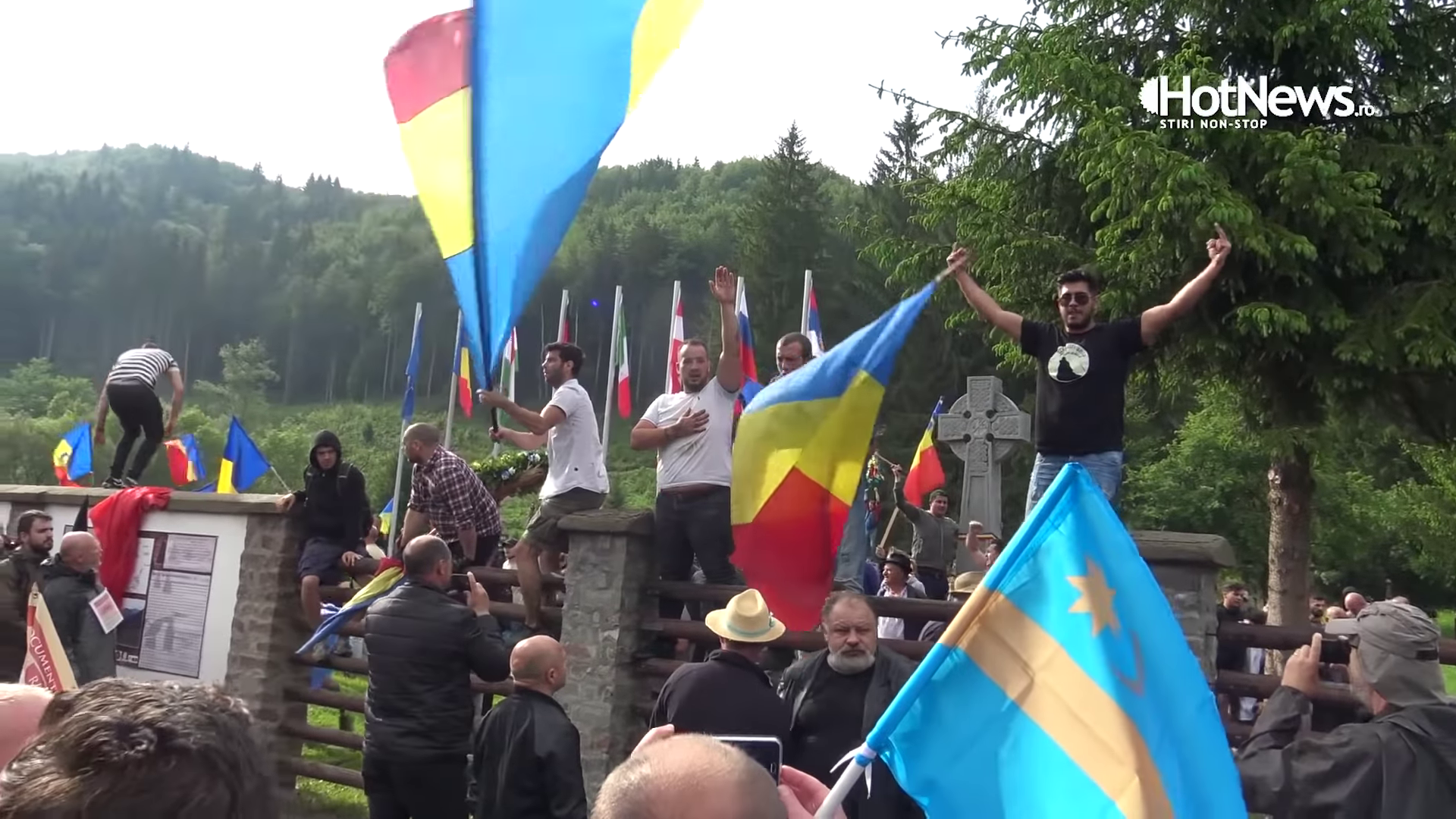
Romanians storming the cemetery

After the illegally installed concrete crosses from the Hungarian war cemetery of Valea Uzului were removed in July 2023, again illegally, Calea Neamului erected 150 Romanian wooden crosses in the military cemetery. Authorities opened a criminal investigation.

Ignoring court rulings and taking advantage of the inaction and the tacit support of the Romanian authorities, Romanians organized by nationalist parties and anti-Hungarian organizations like the Alliance for the Union of Romanians (AUR) and Calea Neamului return since then to the cemetery several times a year, using military holidays as a pretext. When they are there, they shout nationalist slogans and commemorate the Romanian dead allegedly buried there, reiteratedly installing new Romanian crosses into the cemetery.

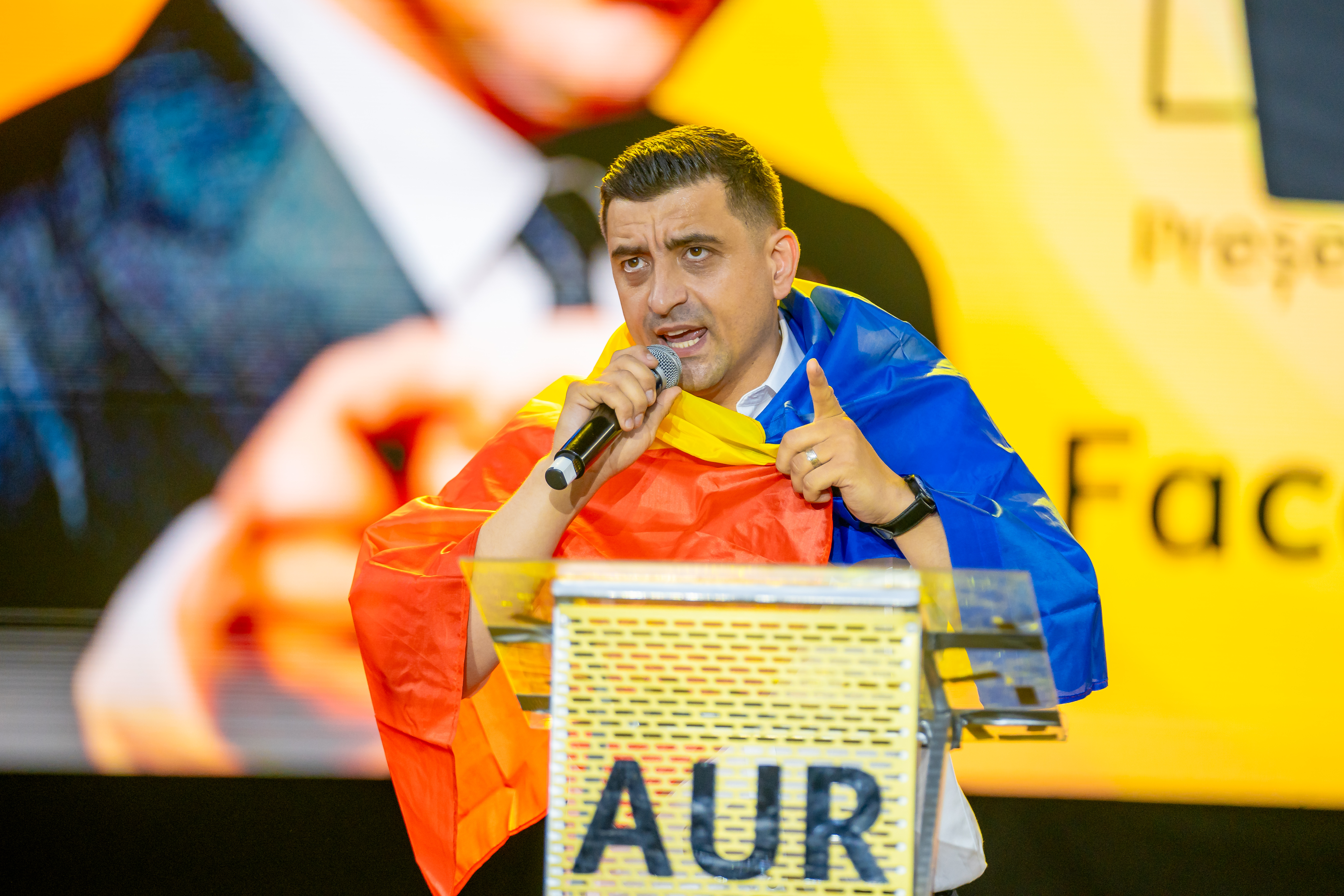
In 2019, the far-right Alliance for the Union of Romanians (AUR) began its political activity in connection with the conflict at the Hungarian military cemetery at Valea Uzului. George Simion, the party's leader, was involved in the violent incidents that took place during the event. Simion is notorious for his anti-Hungarian sentiments, promoting hostility toward the indigenous Hungarian community in Transylvania in Romania.

== Legacy ==
Péter Magyar, winner of the 2026 Hungarian presidential election, sharply criticized former Prime Minister Viktor Orbán at his international press conference the following day, accusing him of betraying ethnic Hungarians in Transylvania by supporting George Simion in the Romanian presidential election, claiming that Simion had "danced on the graves of our Hungarian ancestors" and had "desecrated the graves of Hungarian people".

== See also ==
- Anti-Hungarian sentiment
- Ethnic clashes of Târgu Mureș
- Hungary–Romania relations
- Hungarians in Romania
