= Politics of Romania =

Politics of Romania Politica României
- Coat of arms of Romania
- Polity type: Unitary semi-presidential republic
- Constitution: Constitution of Romania (1991)

Legislative branch
- Name: Parliament
- Type: Bicameral
- Meeting place: Palace of the Parliament
- Upper house
- Name: Senate
- Presiding officer: Mircea Abrudean, President of the Senate
- Lower house
- Name: Chamber of Deputies
- Presiding officer: Sorin Grindeanu, President of the Chamber of Deputies

Executive branch
- Head of state
- Title: President
- Currently: Nicușor Dan
- Appointer: Direct popular vote, two-round system
- Head of government
- Title: Prime Minister
- Currently: Ilie Bolojan
- Appointer: President
- Cabinet
- Name: Government of Romania
- Current cabinet: Bolojan cabinet
- Leader: Prime Minister
- Deputy leader: Deputy Prime Minister
- Appointer: President
- Headquarters: Victoria Palace
- Ministries: 18

Judicial branch
- Name: Judiciary of Romania
- High Court of Cassation and Justice
- Chief judge: Corina Corbu
- Constitutional Court

Romania's political framework is a semi-presidential representative republic where the Prime Minister is the head of government, while the President, according to the Constitution, holds a more symbolic role, being responsible for the foreign policy, signing certain decrees, approving laws promulgated by the parliament, and nominating the head of government (i.e. Prime Minister). Romania has a multi-party system, with legislative power vested in the government and the two chambers of the Parliament, more specifically the Chamber of Deputies and the Senate. The judiciary is independent of the executive and the legislature in theory. From 1948 until 1989, the communist rule political structure took place in the framework of a one-party socialist republic governed by the Romanian Communist Party (PCR) as its only legal party.

Romania's 1991 constitution (amended in 2003) proclaims it a democratic and social republic, deriving its sovereignty from the people. According to the constitution, "Human dignity, civic rights and freedoms, the unhindered development of human personality, justice, and political pluralism are supreme and guaranteed values."

The constitution provides for a president, a Parliament, a Constitutional Court, and a separate court system which includes the High Court of Cassation and Justice. The right to vote is granted to all citizens over 18 years of age.

The V-Dem Democracy Report 2025 classified Romania as an electoral democracy, while noting autocratization tendencies, citing Russian meddling in the election process leading to the annulment of the first round of the 2024 presidential election and a decrease in opposition parties’ autonomy.

Romania was fully admitted to the Schengen Area on 1 January 2025.

== Executive branch ==
Main office-holders
Office	Name	Party	Since
President	Nicușor Dan	Independent	26 May 2025
Prime Minister	Luca Niculescu	Independent	20 October 2026

The president is elected by popular vote for a maximum of two five-year terms (four-year terms until 2004). The president is head of state (charged with safeguarding the constitution, foreign affairs, and the proper functioning of public authority), supreme commander of the armed forces, and chairperson of the Supreme Council of National Defense. According to the constitution, the president acts as a mediator among the state's power centers and between the state and society. The president nominates the prime minister after consultation with the party holding an absolute majority in Parliament or, if there is no such majority, with all the parties in Parliament.

Ambiguity in the Constitution of Romania (Article 85 (1), Article 103 (1)) may lead to situations where a coalition of parties obtaining an absolute majority in Parliament, or a party holding a relative majority in Parliament, would be unable to nominate a prime minister because the president would refuse the nomination (with no party holding an absolute majority in Parliament). According to Article 103 (1), "unless no such majority exists", is interpreted by the president as "unless no such party exists" (although an absolute majority may be formed by one party, a coalition of parties, or an alliance).

In the 2008 parliamentary elections, the Alliance PSD+PC won 33.1% of the seats in the Chamber of Deputies and 34.2% of the seats in the Senate. The PNL won 18.6% of the seats in the Chamber of Deputies and 18.7% of the seats in the Senate, giving both parties a majority in the Chamber of Deputies and the Senate. However, the president nominated a member of the PDL (which won less than 32.4% of the seats in the Chamber of Deputies and 33.5% of the seats in the Senate. The nominated prime minister chooses the other members of the government, and the government and its program must be confirmed by a vote of confidence from Parliament.

== Legislative branch ==
Main office-holders
Office	Name	Party	Since
President of the Senate	Mircea Abrudean	National Liberal Party (PNL)	24 June 2025
President of the Chamber of Deputies	Sorin Grindeanu	Social Democratic Party (PSD)	24 June 2025

The national legislature is a bicameral parliament (Romanian: Parlament), consisting of the Chamber of Deputies (Romanian: Camera Deputaților) and the Senate (Romanian: Senat). Members are elected to four-year terms by universal suffrage in a party-list proportional representation electoral system. Beginning in 2008, members are elected by mixed-member proportional representation.

The number of senators and deputies has varied in each legislature, reflecting population changes. In 2008, there were 137 senatorial seats and 334 seats in the Chamber of Deputies; of the 334 deputy seats, 18 were held by ethnic minority representatives which would not meet the five-percent electoral threshold required for other parties and organizations.

== Classification of political parties ==
Romania has a multiparty political system, which makes a majority government virtually impossible (unless a very high score is achieved in the legislative election by one particular political party). Smaller parliamentary parties have sometimes merged with larger ones during previous legislatures before 2020 (or created/were part of several electoral alliances). Currently, there are five main parliamentary parties (excluding the 18 ethnic-minority parties which have one representative each) as follows:

Logo	Party name	Ideology	Leader(s)	Notes
	Social Democratic Party (Romanian: Partidul Social Democrat)	Social democratic, centre-left populist, de facto catch all	Sorin Grindeanu	Currently the largest party in parliament. He currently leads a government formed with PNL and UDMR (government composition that was between 2021 and 2023). He achieved his worst results in recent elections.
	Alliance for the Union of Romanians (Romanian: Alianța pentru Unirea Românilor)	Romanian nationalism, Romanian irredentism, Euroscepticism, right-wing populism, national conservatism	George Simion	Currently the second largest opposition party in parliament. In the legislative elections, AUR won 20% of the vote in all of Romania and the diaspora, which resulted in aresult that made the party the second largest in the country at the central political level.
	National Liberal Party (Romanian: Partidul Național Liberal)	Conservative liberal, centre-right populist, de facto catch all	Ilie Bolojan	Until November 2021, the largest ruling party through a coalition government previously established in December 2020, but subsequently formed a minority government solely with the UDMR/RMDSZ after early September 2021 until late November of the same year (even after it was dismissed by a recorded-voted no confidence motion). It is currently part of a grand coalition government known as the National Coalition for Romania (CNR for short) along with PSD, being the second largest party within it. Additionally, it has also been crushed by internal disputes, growing corruption scandals, and departures of various MPs and local politicians, some of which had already founded several splinter parties (e.g. most notably Ludovic Orban's Force of the Right or FD for short).
	Save Romania Union (Romanian: Uniunea Salvați România)	Liberalism, Progressivism, Social liberalism, Economic liberalism, Pro-Europeanism	Dominic Fritz	Currently, the third largest parliamentary party (previously established as a formal political and electoral alliance between the USR and PLUS known as the 2020 USR PLUS Alliance and then simply as USR-PLUS/USR PLUS) and in opposition towards the PSD-PNL-UDMR/RMDSZ grand coalition government (as well as to the current PSD-PNL government). Syncretic political position (mostly with considerable focus towards anti-corruption and the rule of law). Recently has clarified its political position (center-right) with strong emphasis on economic liberalism, anti-corruption policies. Also recently, the party has taken slightly populist positions.
	S.O.S. Romania (Romanian: S.O.S. România)	Romanian ultranationalism, Romanian irredentism, hard euroscepticism, social conservatism	Diana Șoșoacă	Founded in 2021 and becoming popular after the entry of Diana Șoșoacă, the party managed to send 2 MEPs after the 2024 European Parliament election. In the parliamentary election it obtained a significant representation, becoming the fifth largest party in the parliament, and the second nationalist party after AUR. The party's rhetoric is ultra-nationalist, nationalist-revolutionary, and hardly Eurosceptic.
	Party of Young People (Romanian: Partidul Oamenilor Tineri)	Right-wing populism, Romanian nationalism, christian right	Anamaria Gavrilă	Founded in 2023 by Anamaria Gavrilă, former AUR deputy, the party promotes traditionalist and national-christian ideologies, opposing abortion and compulsory vaccination. POT supported the candidacy of Călin Georgescu in the presidential election of 2024 and obtained parliamentary representation following the elections of December 1, 2024. The party is currently in opposition.
	Democratic Alliance of Hungarians in Romania (Romanian: Uniunea Democrată Maghiară din România)	Centre-right, Hungarian minority interests, Hungarian ethnic minority party	Hunor Kelemen	Previously, the smallest ruling party in the centre-right coalition formed in December 2020 (which was later disbanded in September 2021). It was also part of the CNR ruling grand coalition along with PNL and PSD, being still the smallest party (or junior partner) in the aforementioned government. Since June 2023, it switched to opposition after not voting the Ciolacu Cabinet.

The main four non-parliamentary parties (the first two around the five-percent threshold) with local representatives are as follows:

Logo	Party name	Romanian name	Ideology	Leader
	Health Education Nature Sustainability Party	Partidul Sănătate, Educație, Natură, Sustenabilitate (SENS)	Centre-left Green politics Progressivism	Andrei Macsut
	Force of the Right	Forța Dreptei (FD)	Centre-right Liberal conservatism	Ludovic Orban
	People's Movement Party	Partidul Mișcarea Populară (PMP)	Centre-right Christian democracy	Eugen Tomac
	United Social Democratic Party	Partidul Social Democrat Unit (PSDU)	Centre-left Social democracy Christian left	Oana Crețu

Unlike other former Soviet-bloc countries (such as, most notably, neighbouring Republic of Moldova), no political party claiming to be the successor of the Romanian Communist Party (PCR) has been or is currently a significant player on the political scene, although the main continuator of FSN, more specifically PSD, has many times raised suspicions and accusations from electoral contenders regarding the past political careers of many of its current and former members who were first tier, high-ranking members of the PCR before the 1989 Romanian Revolution. The PNL also has many former Securitate members, former PCR members, or their relatives, in part through the merger with the PDL in 2014 but not only.

== Latest elections ==
=== Presidential election ===
Electoral performance of candidates from the PSD, PNL and PD/PDL in the first round of Romanian presidential elections, 2000─2024

The last presidential election took place on May 4 and May 18, 2025, respectively. Following the events that occurred during the first round of voting and the finding of foreign interference in the November 2024 presidential elections, the Constitutional Court annulled the elections, so they were repeated in May 2025.

Candidate	Party	First round		Second round	
Candidate	Party	Votes	%	Votes	%
George Simion	Alliance for the Union of Romanians	3,862,761	40.96	5,339,053	46.40
Nicușor Dan	Independent	1,979,767	20.99	6,168,642	53.60
Crin Antonescu	Romania Forward Electoral Alliance (Note: Also endorsed by ethnic minority parties)	1,892,930	20.07		
Victor Ponta	Independent	1,230,164	13.04		
Elena Lasconi	Save Romania Union	252,721	2.68		
Lavinia Șandru	Social Liberal Humanist Party	60,682	0.64		
Daniel Funeriu	Independent	49,604	0.53		
Cristian Terheș	Romanian National Conservative Party	36,445	0.39		
Sebastian Popescu	New Romania Party	25,994	0.28		
John Ion Banu	Independent	22,020	0.23		
Silviu Predoiu	National Action League Party	17,186	0.18		
Total		9,430,274	100.00	11,507,695	100.00
Valid votes		9,430,274	98.52	11,507,695	98.85
Invalid/blank votes		141,466	1.48	134,171	1.15
Total votes		9,571,740	100.00	11,641,866	100.00
Registered voters/turnout		17,988,031	53.21	17,988,218	64.72
Source: Permanent Electoral Authority

=== European Parliament election ===
Party	Votes	%	Seats	+/–
PSD–PNL Alliance	4,341,686	48.55	19	–
AUR Alliance	1,334,905	14.93	6	New
United Right Alliance	778,901	8.71	3	–
Democratic Alliance of Hungarians in Romania	579,180	6.48	2	–
S.O.S. Romania	450,040	5.03	2	New
Renewing Romania's European Project	334,703	3.74	0	New
United Diaspora Party	159,943	1.79	0	New
Social Liberal Humanist Party	132,402	1.48	0	New
Patriots Party	65,440	0.73	0	New
Greater Romania Party	59,272	0.66	0	–
The Right Alternative	40,281	0.45	0	New
Socialist Romania Alliance (PSR–PSDM)	37,119	0.42	0	–
Independents	628,754	7.03	1	–
Total	8,942,626	100.00	33	+1
Valid votes	8,942,626	94.82		
Invalid/blank votes	488,551	5.18		
Total votes	9,431,177	100.00		
Registered voters/turnout	18,025,329	52.32		
Source: BEC

=== Legislative election ===
The latest legislative election was held on 1 December 2024. The two tables below are represented the results for both the Senate and the Chamber of Deputies:

==== Chamber of Deputies ====
Seat distribution in the Chamber of Deputies in Romania after the 1 December 2024 legislative election: PSD: 86 seats AUR: 63 seats PNL: 49 seats USR: 40 seats SOS RO: 28 seats POT: 24 seats UDMR: 22 seats National minorities: 19 seats

Party	Votes	%	Seats	+/–
Social Democratic Party	2,030,144	21.96	86	–24
Alliance for the Union of Romanians	1,665,143	18.01	63	+30
National Liberal Party	1,219,810	13.20	49	–44
Save Romania Union	1,146,357	12.40	40	–15
S.O.S. Romania	679,967	7.36	28	New
Party of Young People	596,745	6.46	24	New
Democratic Alliance of Hungarians in Romania	585,397	6.33	22	+1
Health Education Nature Sustainability Party	276,494	2.99	0	New
Force of the Right (Note: Alliance of Liberal-Conservative Right Forces)	189,678	2.05	0	New
United Social Democratic Party	177,137	1.92	0	New
Renewing Romania's European Project (Note: Platform for Democracy, Prosperity, and Progress)	114,223	1.24	0	New
Justice and Respect in Europe for All Party	107,474	1.16	0	New
Romanian National Conservative Party	45,687	0.49	0	New
Patriots of the Romanian People	40,960	0.44	0	0
Romanian Ecologist Party	34,641	0.37	0	0
Independent Social Democratic Party	33,372	0.36	0	0
Romania in Action Party	28,504	0.31	0	New
National Christian Alliance	25,789	0.28	0	0
New Romania Party	14,107	0.15	0	0
Party of the Roma "Pro Europa"	13,881	0.15	1	0
Association of Macedonians of Romania	13,800	0.15	1	0
Socialist Romania Alliance	12,849	0.14	0	0
League of Albanians of Romania	9,177	0.10	1	0
Union of the Ukrainians of Romania	8,750	0.09	1	0
Democratic Forum of Germans in Romania	8,577	0.09	1	0
Union of Serbs of Romania	7,962	0.09	1	0
Alternative for National Dignity	7,747	0.08	0	0
Hellenic Union of Romania	7,565	0.08	1	0
Community of the Lipovan Russians in Romania	7,434	0.08	1	0
Democratic Union of Slovaks and Czechs of Romania	7,420	0.08	1	0
Federation of the Jewish Communities in Romania	5,281	0.06	1	0
Bulgarian Union of Banat–Romania	5,089	0.06	1	0
Democratic Union of Turkic-Muslim Tatars of Romania	4,908	0.05	1	0
Union of Armenians of Romania	4,747	0.05	1	0
Cultural Union of Ruthenians of Romania	4,571	0.05	1	0
Democratic Turkish Union of Romania	4,547	0.05	1	0
Union of Croats of Romania	4,413	0.05	1	0
Union of Poles of Romania "Dom Polski"	4,215	0.05	1	0
Association of Italians of Romania	4,128	0.04	1	0
National Action League Party	2,912	0.03	0	New
Forum of Czechs in Romania	2,817	0.03	1	+1
Party of Faithful People	1,143	0.01	0	0
Geto-Dacian Union Party	435	0.00	0	0
Patria Party	391	0.00	0	0
Republican Party of Romania	279	0.00	0	0
Christian Democratic National Peasants' Party	270	0.00	0	0
Green Party	248	0.00	0	0
United Pensioners' Party	229	0.00	0	0
Party of Justice	184	0.00	0	0
Independents	76,043	0.82	0	0
Total	9,243,641	100.00	331	+1
Valid votes	9,243,641	98.17		
Invalid/blank votes	171,877	1.83		
Total votes	9,415,518	100.00		
Registered voters/turnout	19,503,273	48.28		
Source: Permanent Electoral Authority; Seat counts

Popular vote
PSD	21.96%
AUR	18.01%
PNL	13.20%
USR	12.40%
SOS RO	7.36%
POT	6.46%
UDMR	6.33%
SENS	2.99%
FD	2.05%
Others	9.24%

Seats summary
PSD	25.98%
AUR	19.34%
PNL	14.80%
USR	12.08%
SOS RO	8.16%
POT	7.25%
UDMR	6.65%
Ethnic minorities	5.74%

==== Senate ====
Seat distribution in the Senate of Romania after the 1 December 2024 legislative election: PSD: 36 seats AUR: 28 seats PNL: 22 seats USR: 19 seats SOS RO: 12 seats UDMR: 10 seats POT: 7 seats

Party	Votes	%	Seats	+/–
Social Democratic Party	2,065,087	22.30	36	–11
Alliance for the Union of Romanians	1,694,705	18.30	28	+14
National Liberal Party	1,322,468	14.28	22	–19
Save Romania Union	1,134,831	12.26	19	–6
S.O.S. Romania	718,409	7.76	12	New
Party of Young People	591,927	6.39	7	New
Democratic Alliance of Hungarians in Romania	590,783	6.38	10	+1
Health Education Nature Sustainability Party	263,173	2.84	0	New
Force of the Right (Note: Alliance of Liberal-Conservative Right Forces)	173,703	1.88	0	New
United Social Democratic Party	164,659	1.78	0	New
Renewing Romania's European Project (Note: Platform for Democracy, Prosperity, and Progress)	126,408	1.37	0	New
Justice and Respect in Europe for All Party	114,500	1.24	0	New
Romanian National Conservative Party	50,287	0.54	0	New
Patriots of the Romanian People	48,436	0.52	0	0
Independent Social Democratic Party	41,712	0.45	0	0
Romanian Ecologist Party	38,561	0.42	0	0
National Christian Alliance	31,094	0.34	0	0
Romania in Action Party	30,252	0.33	0	New
New Romania Party	17,203	0.19	0	0
Socialist Romania Alliance	16,256	0.18	0	0
Alternative for National Dignity	10,473	0.11	0	0
National Action League Party	3,838	0.04	0	New
Party of Faithful People	806	0.01	0	0
Patria Party	493	0.01	0	0
Geto-Dacian Union Party	480	0.01	0	0
Christian Democratic National Peasants' Party	371	0.00	0	0
Party of Justice	325	0.00	0	0
Republican Party of Romania	314	0.00	0	0
Green Party	290	0.00	0	0
Phralipe Party of the Roma	287	0.00	0	0
Independents	7,826	0.08	0	0
Total	9,259,957	100.00	134	0
Valid votes	9,259,957	98.41		
Invalid/blank votes	149,557	1.59		
Total votes	9,409,514	100.00		
Registered voters/turnout	19,503,273	48.25		
Source: Permanent Electoral Authority; Seat counts

Popular vote
PSD	22.30%
AUR	18.30%
PNL	14.28%
USR	12.26%
SOS RO	7.76%
POT	6.39%
UDMR	6.38%
SENS	2.84%
FD	1.88%
Others	7.61%

Seats summary
PSD	26.86%
AUR	20.89%
PNL	16.41%
USR	14.17%
SOS RO	8.95%
UDMR	7.46%
POT	5.22%

=== Local election ===
The latest general local election was held on 27 September 2020.

Summary of the 2024 Romanian local elections results
Party	Mayor of Bucharest (PGMB)			Mayors (P)			Local Councils seats (CL)			County Councils seats (CJ)		
Party	Votes	%	Seats	Votes	%	Seats	Votes	%	Seats	Votes	%	Seats
Social Democratic Party (Romanian: Partidul Social Democrat - PSD)	163,147	22.17%	0	3,045,816	34.74%	1,677	2,830,129	32.56%	16,509	2,640,850	33.50%	521
National Liberal Party (Romanian: Partidul Național Liberal - PNL)	57,336	7.79%	0	2,548,478	29.07%	1,132	2,273,927	26.16%	12,802	2,178,075	27.63%	412
Alliance for the Union of Romanians (Romanian: Alianța pentru Unirea Românilor - AUR)	22,208	3.01%	0	549,306	6.26%	30	829,365	9.54%	3,527	843,734	10.70%	159
United Right Alliance (Romanian: Alianța Dreapta Unită - ADU)	352,734 (with REPER)	47.94% (with REPER)	1	550,850	6.28%	28	583,042	6.70%	961	653,476	8.29%	75
Democratic Alliance of Hungarians in Romania (Romanian: Uniunea Democrată Maghiară din România - UDMR)	-	-	-	378,594	4.31%	200	471,588	5.42%	2,525	506,659	6.42%	104
PSD-PNL Alliance (Romanian: Alianța PSD-PNL - PSD-PNL) (Note: Social Democratic Party and National Liberal Party have run together in some cities, countryside and in Timiș and Ilfov counties at local election)	-	-	-	511,190	5.83%	29	429,728	4.94%	308	258,741	3.28%	42
S.O.S. Romania (Romanian: S.O.S. România - SOS RO)	18,531	2.51%	0	85,105	0.97%	0	120,819	1.39%	149	226,949	2.87%	0
Social Liberal Humanist Party (Romanian: Partidul Umanist Social Liberal - PUSL)	111.411	15.14%	0	107,355	1.22%	4	128,060	1.47%	225	78,927	1.00%	0
Other political parties, independent contenders, and local alliances	10.394	1.40%	0	990,104	11.32	76	1,022,962	11.82%	3,045	494.716	6.31%	2
Total:	735.761	100	1	8.766.798	100	3,176	8.689.620	100	39,900	7.882.129	100	1,340
Notes
Sources: Romanian Permanent Electoral Authority

== Judicial branch ==
Main office-holders
Office	Name	Party	Since
President of the High Court of Cassation and Justice	Lia Savonea	None	August 2025
President of the Superior Council of Magistrates	Elena Costache	None	August 2025

The Romanian legal system, based on the Napoleonic Code, is inquisitorial. The judiciary is independent, and judges appointed by the president are not removable. The president and other judges of the Supreme Court are appointed for six-year terms and may serve consecutive terms. Proceedings are public, except in special circumstances provided for by law.

Judicial power is vested in a hierarchical system of courts, culminating with the supreme court: Înalta Curte de Justiție și Casație (High Court of Cassation and Justice), whose judges are appointed by the president on the recommendation of the Superior Council of Magistrates.

The Ministry of Justice represents the general interests of society and defends the rule of law and citizens' rights and freedoms. The ministry exercises its power through independent, impartial public prosecutors.

=== Constitutional issues ===
Main office-holders
Office	Name	Party	Since
President of the Constitutional Court	Simina Tănăsescu	None	July 2025

The (Constitutional Court) judges issues of constitutionality invoked in any court and judges the compliance of laws (or other state regulations) with the Romanian Constitution. The court, outside the judicial branch, follows the tradition of the French Constitutional Council with nine judges serving nine-year, non-renewable terms. Since the 2003 revision of the constitution, its decisions cannot be overturned by a parliamentary majority.

== Regional institutions ==
The Romanian political mechanism

For territorial and administrative purposes, Romania is divided into 41 counties (județe, singular județ) and the city of Bucharest. Each county is governed by an elected council. Local councils and elected mayors are the public authorities in villages and towns. The county council coordinates the activities of village and town councils.

The central government appoints a prefect for each county and Bucharest, who represents the government at the local level and directs the ministries and other central agencies at the county level. A prefect may block the action of a local authority if he deems it unlawful or unconstitutional, with the matter then adjudicated by an administrative court.

Under legislation enacted in January 1999, local councils control the spending of their allocations from the central government budget and have the authority to raise additional revenue locally. Although centrally-appointed prefects formerly had significant authority over the budget, this is now limited to a review of expenditures to determine their constitutionality.

== Since 1989 ==
Romania has made considerable progress in institutionalizing democratic principles, civil liberties, and respect for human rights since the Romanian Revolution in December 1989. Nevertheless, many present-day Romanian politicians are former members of the Romanian Communist Party (PCR) and have also had ties with the Romanian secret police (i.e. Securitatea). Since membership in the party was a requirement for advancement before 1989, many people joined to get ahead rather than because of ideological conviction; however, the communist past of some Romanian politicians remains highly controversial to the current day.

=== 1990–1992 ===
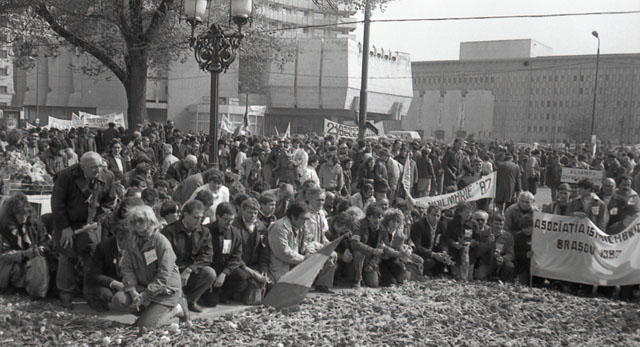
An anti-communist and anti-FSN rally in University square in Bucharest

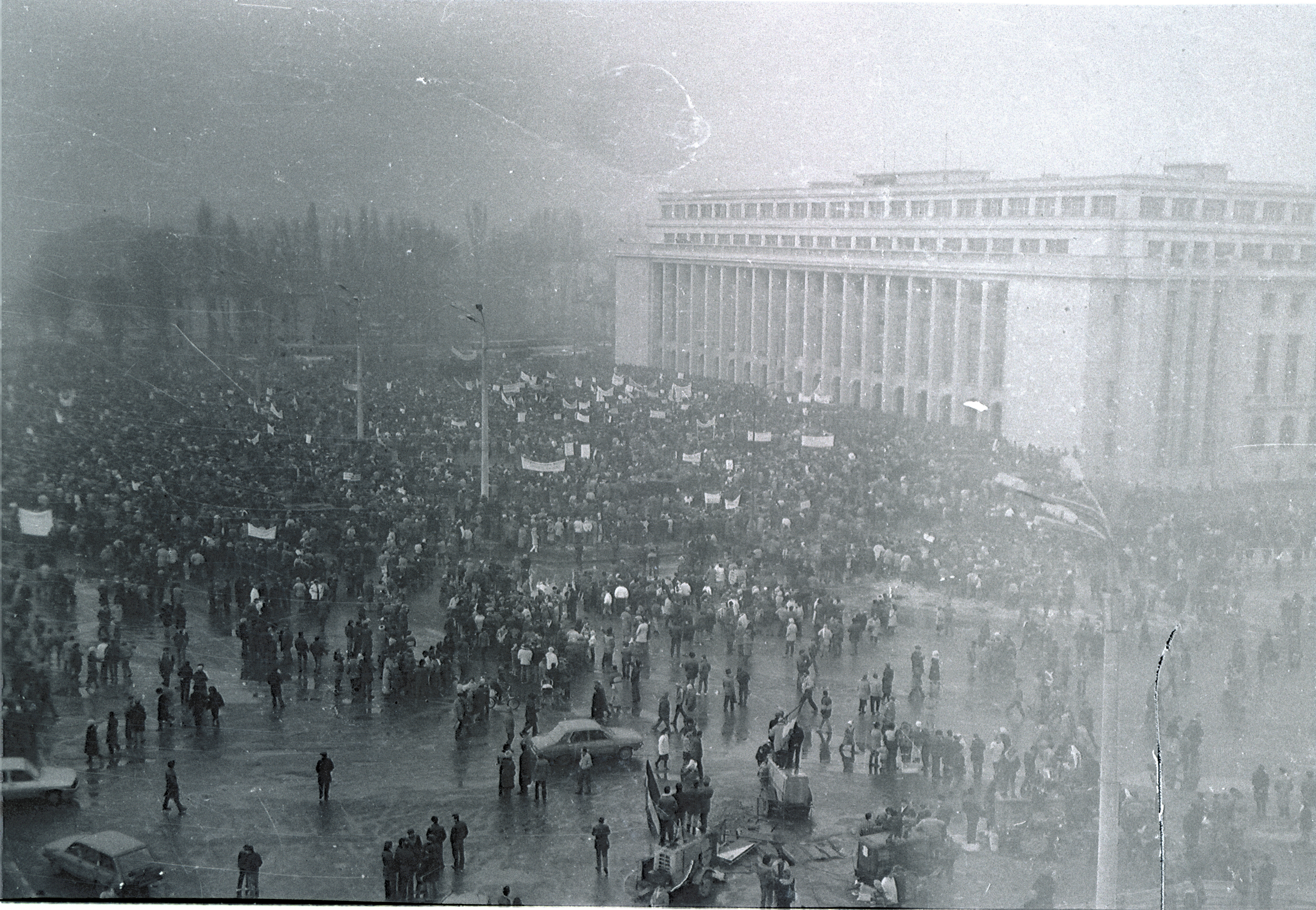
February 1990 Mineriad taking place near Victoria Palace in Bucharest.

The Romanian Communist Party (PCR) officially ceased to exist after the December 1989 Romanian Revolution. An ad interim/acting government swiftly took office starting in late December 1989 which consisted of National Salvation Front (FSN) members and would eventually govern Romania well up until 1992. The FSN had initially not decided to run in the 1990 elections but subsequently retracted their initial position and opted to participate in the 1990 Romanian general election, having the full support of state-owned media and an overwhelming majority of the voters during the electoral campaign, thereby eventually securing a landslide win.

Prior to the 1990 Romanian general election, over 200 new political parties sprang up just after 1989, most of them gravitating towards their leaders rather than revolving around political programs or full-fledged geopolitical agendas. Nevertheless, all major political parties espoused democracy and free market reforms to varying degrees or extents. The largest political party by far, the governing National Salvation Front (FSN), proposed slow, cautious economic reforms, and an artificial, weak social safety net (mostly for the working class of the still operating factories of the heavy industries).

In stark contrast, the main opposition parties, more specifically the National Liberal Party (PNL) and the Christian Democratic National Peasants' Party (PNŢCD), favored rapid, sweeping economic reforms, immediate privatization (which would have caused a shock therapy) as well as a drastic reduction and even total exclusion of former Communist Party (PCR) members from public Romanian political life. Apart from PCR members, the early demands of the Romanian historical democratic parties were also the reduction of the undercover members of the former Securitate (which could have been PCR members as well) from all areas of public life (thereby endorsing the Proclamation of Timișoara and the lustration law against the former Romanian secret police).

In the 1990 presidential and legislative elections, the FSN and its presidential candidate, Ion Iliescu, won with a large majority of the votes (67% and 85.1%, respectively). The strongest opposition parties in the Senate were the Hungarian minority-oriented Democratic Alliance of Hungarians in Romania (UDMR/RMDSZ) (with 7.2%) and the National Liberal Party (PNL) (with 7.1%), followed by the Christian Democratic National Peasants' Party (PNȚCD) with only 2.5% and the Romanian Ecologist Party (with only 1.4%) as well other minor centre-right parties (e.g. Liberal Union–Brătianu, National Reconstruction Party of Romania, and the Democratic Group of the Centre) with less than one per cent.

After FSN Prime Minister Petre Roman's dismissal a few months before the 1992 general elections (following a late 1991 Mineriad), the FSN split in two. President Iliescu's supporters formed a new political party, namely the Democratic National Salvation Front (FDSN) which will later turn into PDSR and then PSD, while Roman's supporters retained the FSN name (which will later turn into PD and then PDL respectively).

=== 1992–1996 ===
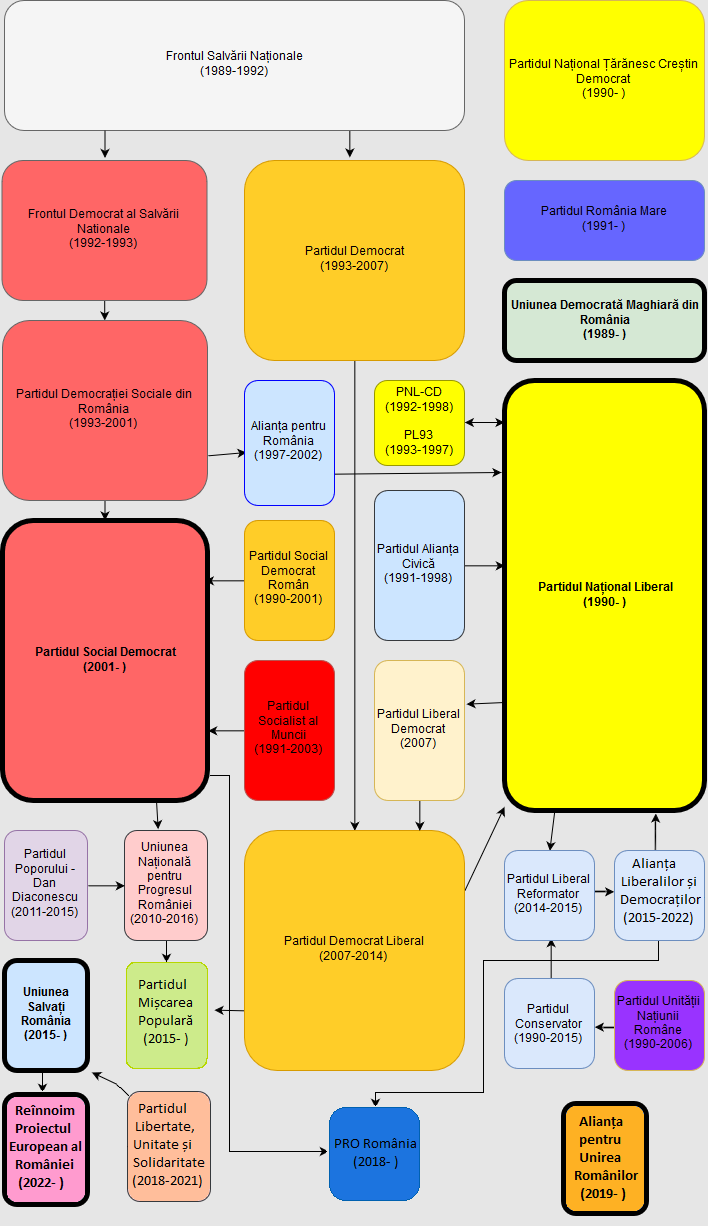
Flow chart depicting a detailed list of the political parties active in Romania since 1990, along with their afferent secessions and fusions/mergers.

The 1992 local, legislative, and presidential elections indicated a major political rift between the urban centres and the countryside. Rural voters, grateful for the restoration of most agricultural land to farmers but fearful of change, strongly favored Iliescu and the FDSN; the urban electorate favored the CDR (a coalition of several parties – the strongest of which were the PNŢCD and the PNL – and several other civic organizations as well) and quicker reform. Iliescu easily won re-election from a field of five other candidates, and the FDSN won a plurality/relative majority of seats in both chambers of the Romanian Parliament.

With the CDR, the second-largest parliamentary group, reluctant to participate in a national-unity coalition, the FDSN (now the PDSR) formed a government under prime minister and economist Nicolae Văcăroiu with parliamentary support on behalf of the nationalists Romanian National Unity Party (PUNR) and Greater Romania Party (PRM) as well as the extreme left-wing Socialist Party of Labour (PSM) led by former PCR Prime Minister Ilie Verdeț. The future coalition would be labeled by the press as the "Red Quadrilateral" (originally known in Romanian as Patrulaterul Roșu).

In January 1994, the governing coalition's stability became problematic when the PUNR threatened to withdraw its support unless it received cabinet portfolios. After intense negotiations, two PUNR members received cabinet portfolios in the Văcăroiu government in August of the same year. The following month, the incumbent justice minister also joined the PUNR. Nevertheless, subsequently, the PRM and the PSM left the coalition in October and December 1995, respectively.

=== 1996–2000 ===
The 1996 local elections indicated a major shift in the political orientation of the Romanian electorate, with opposition parties sweeping Bucharest and most of the larger cities in Transylvania, Banat, Bukovina, and Dobruja. The trend continued in that year's legislative and presidential elections when the opposition dominated the cities and made strong inroads into rural areas previously dominated by President Iliescu and the PDSR (which lost many voters in their traditional stronghold constituencies outside Transylvania).

The opposition campaign emphasized the need to squelch corruption and introduce economic reform favoring liberalization and the free market. This message resonated with voters, resulting in a historical victory for the CDR coalition and the election of Emil Constantinescu as president (partly due to Corneliu Coposu's death as well). To secure its electoral majority, the CDR invited Petre Roman's Democratic Party (the former FSN) and the UDMR/RMDSZ (representing the Hungarian minority) to join the government. Although over the next four years, Romania had three prime ministers (and despite internal frictions), the governing parties preserved their coalition and initiated a series of much-needed reforms.

=== 2000–2004 ===
Constantinescu stated in 2000 that he is no longer running for a second term, claiming that the system had defeated him. The CDR-led coalition with its new candidate Mugur Isărescu lost the first round of presidential elections held in November 2000 as a result of popular dissatisfaction with infighting among the constituent parties during the preceding four years and the economic hardship brought about by structural reforms. In the second round, Ion Iliescu, running again as the Social Democratic Party (PSD) candidate, won by a wide margin over extreme nationalist Greater Romania Party (PRM) candidate Corneliu Vadim Tudor. Iliescu subsequently appointed Adrian Năstase Prime Minister. In the Parliament, the PSD government (like its predecessor) relied on the support of the UDMR/RMDSZ, which did not join the cabinet but negotiated annual packages of legislation and other measures favoring Romania's ethnic Hungarians (essentially through a confidence and supply agreement).

Năstase, in his four years as prime minister, continued the previous government's pro-Western foreign policy. The period was characterized by political stability unprecedented in post-communist Romania and consistent economic growth. Romania joined NATO in the spring of 2004 and signed an accession treaty to join the EU in 2007. However, the PSD government was plagued by allegations of corruption which would be significant factors in its eventual defeat in local and national elections in 2004.

In September 2003, the Democratic Party (PD) and the National Liberal Party (PNL) formed an electoral alliance, more specifically the Justice and Truth (DA) Alliance, as a mainstream opposition bloc to the ruling PSD. The DA Alliance agreed, among other measures, to vote as a bloc in the parliament and local councils and run common candidates in national and local elections. In October 2003, the country held a referendum on several constitutional amendments deemed necessary for EU accession. The amendments included provisions to allow foreigners to own land in Romania and to change the president's term from four to five years.

=== 2004–2008 ===
In 2004, Traian Băsescu, the then-leader of the Democratic Party (PD), won the presidential election by a narrow margin. Băsescu subsequently appointed former national liberal leader Călin Popescu-Tăriceanu as prime minister. Popescu-Tăriceanu headed a government composed of the PNL, PD, UDMR/RMDSZ, and PC (formerly known as the Romanian Humanist Party or PUR). In order to secure a parliamentary majority, the coalition government relied on the support of 18 parliamentary seats reserved for ethnic-minority representatives.

The government's narrow majority in the Parliament led to calls for early elections. In July 2005, Prime Minister Popescu-Tăriceanu voiced plans to resign, prompting new elections; he then backtracked, noting his and the cabinet's need to focus on relief efforts for summer floods. During its first year, the government was also tested by a successfully resolved hostage crisis involving three Romanian journalists kidnapped in Iraq and avian influenza in several parts of the country, transmitted by wild birds migrating from Asia.

The government's overriding objective was the accession of Romania to the European Union (EU), and on 1 January 2007 Romania became the 26th member of the EU. The government also maintained good relations with the United States, signing an agreement in December 2005 which would allow American troops to train and serve at several Romanian military facilities. Băsescu and Popescu-Tăriceanu pledged to combat high-level corruption and implement broader reforms to modernize sectors such as the judicial system and healthcare.

On 19 April 2007, the Romanian Parliament suspended President Băsescu on charges of unconstitutional conduct. The suspension, passed by a 322–108 vote, opened the way for a national referendum on impeachment which failed by a large popular vote, and as such Băsescu was reinstated as president.

=== 2008–2012 ===
The November 2008 parliamentary elections were close, with the Social Democrats (PSD) winning 33.9% of the vote, President Traian Băsescu's centre-right Liberal Democrats (PDL) taking 32.3%, and the ruling National Liberals (PNL) receiving 18.6%. The Liberal Democrats and Social Democrats formed a coalition after the election. Former prime minister Theodor Stolojan withdrew his candidacy for the premiership and President Băsescu nominated Emil Boc, president of the Liberal Democrats, as prime minister.

With the onset of the Great Recession, the Romanian political scene saw tensions between the president and the prime minister on the one hand as well as between the general population on the other hand. Tensions escalated with a 2012 political crisis and another attempt to impeach President Băsescu. In the referendum, more than 7.4 million people (nearly 90%) supported Băsescu's removal from office. However, the Constitutional Court invalidated the referendum because the majority of the population did not vote (the voter turnout was 46%); Băsescu had called the referendum a coup d'état and asked the public to boycott it. All these events have been heavily criticized by international political figures, most notably by German chancellor Angela Merkel.

=== 2012–2016 ===
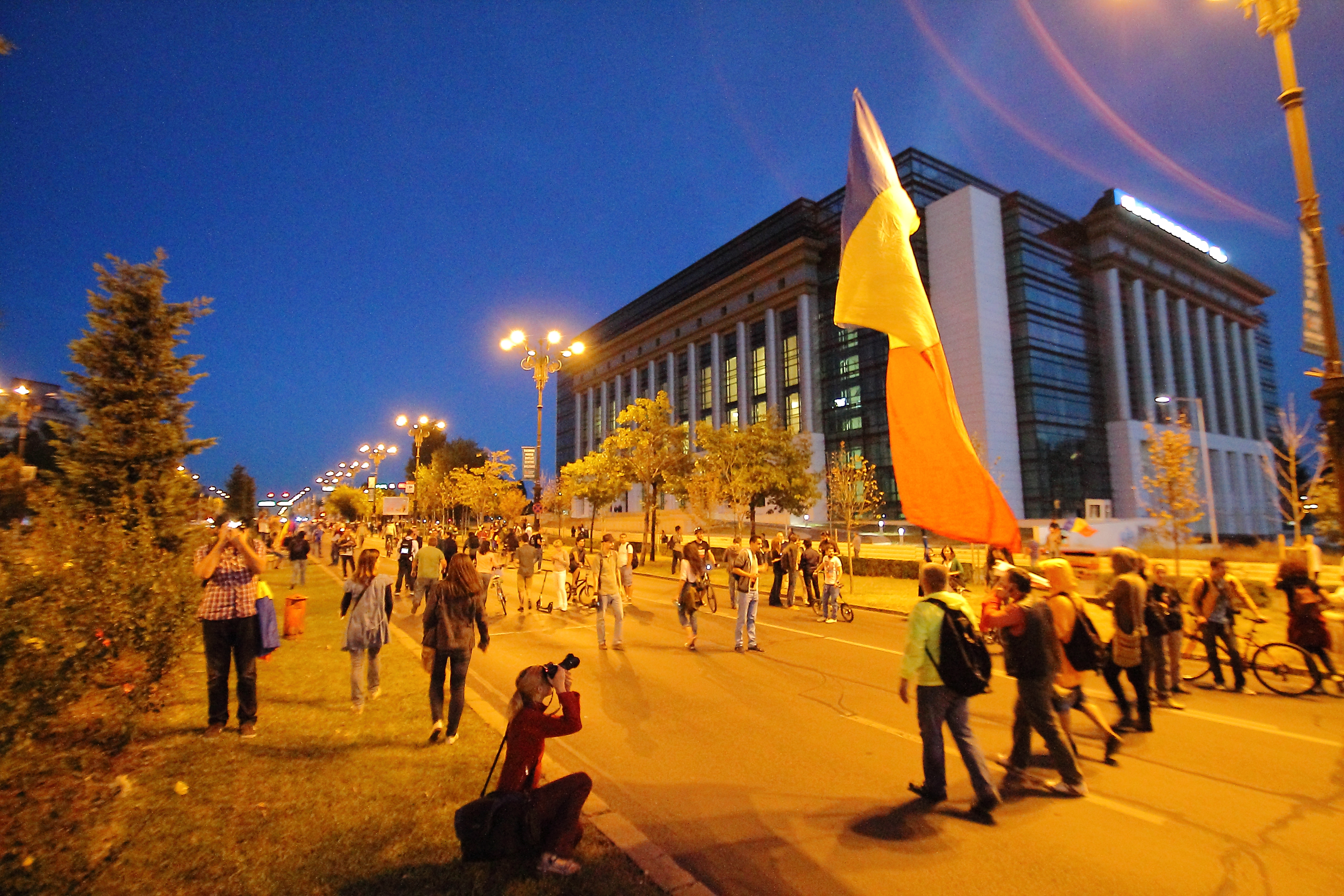
Protest against Roșia Montană Project in Bucharest in 2013, taking place near the National Library of Romania.

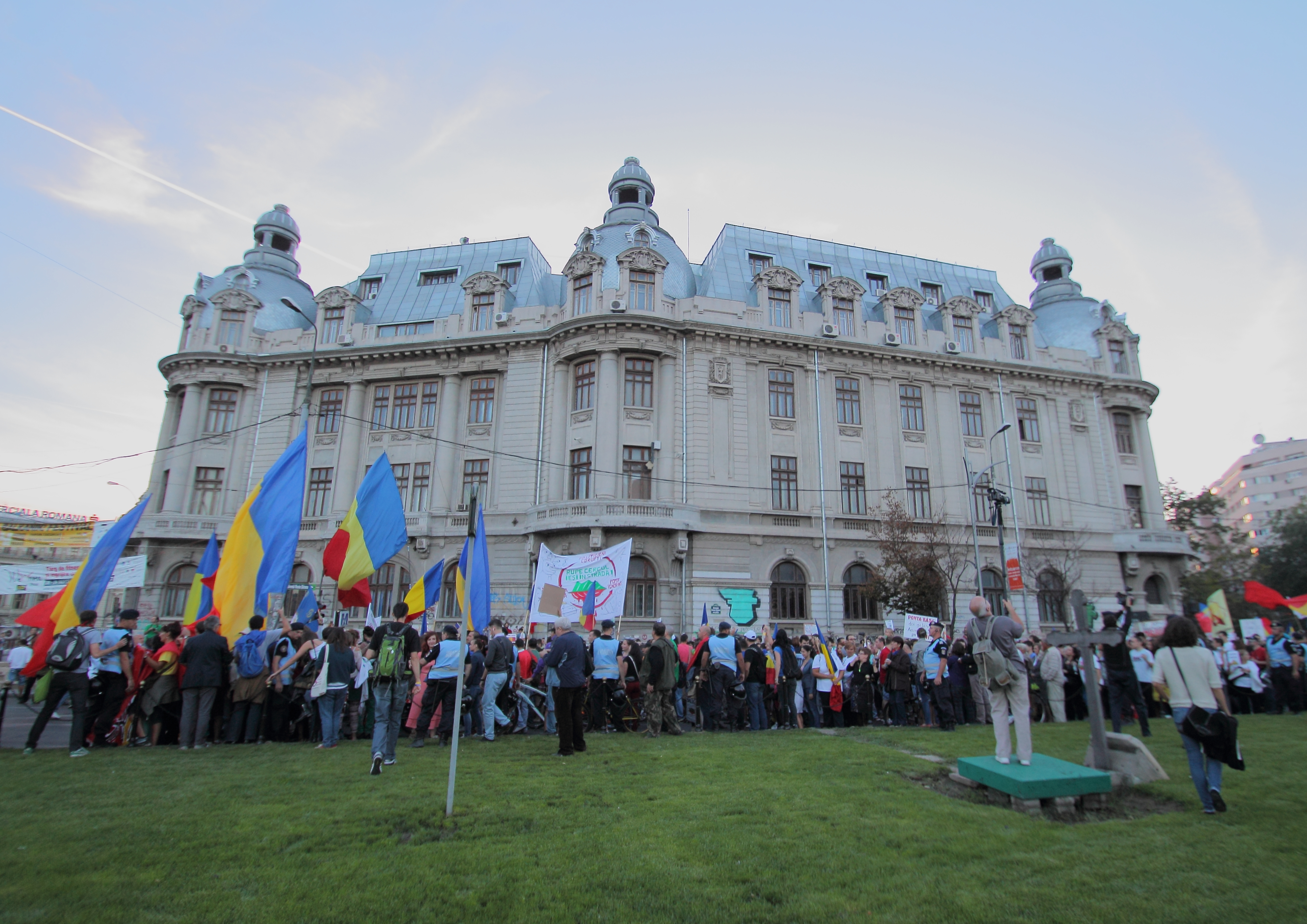
The 2013 protests against the Roșia Montană Project turned into an anti-government social movement.

The legislative elections of 9 December 2012 were seen by the public as an opportunity for change and to oust Băsescu. The Social Liberal Union (USL) received a large majority in the Chamber of Deputies and the Senate (60.07 and 58.61 percent of the vote, respectively) and a record 395 seats. The new prime minister, Victor Ponta, quickly formed a government but the failure to adopt reforms quickly triggered a wave of protests against a government seen as not fulfilling the promises of the 2012 electoral campaign. Two other projects of national interest (shale drilling and the Roșia Montană mining project) unleashed more protests. The demonstrations, initially ecological in focus, became anti-government protests.

In early 2014, the PNL broke away from the USL and entered opposition. Along with the PDL, the PNL formed the Christian Liberal Alliance (ACL) to support the candidature of Klaus Iohannis as President of Romania and later agreed on a future merger that would retain the name of the National Liberal Party (PNL). Iohannis won a surprise victory in front of the incumbent PM Victor Ponta in the second round of the 2014 presidential elections, by a margin of 54.43%. At that time, many voters abroad were rightfully angry because they were not all given the right to cast their ballots, which represented one of the key reasons for Ponta's defeat.

In late 2015, another series of nationwide protests ultimately prompted Prime Minister Victor Ponta's resignation. Shortly afterward, President Iohannis appointed then independent-technocrat Dacian Cioloș as Prime Minister, who led a likewise independent-technocratic government between late 2015 and early 2017.

=== 2016–2020 ===
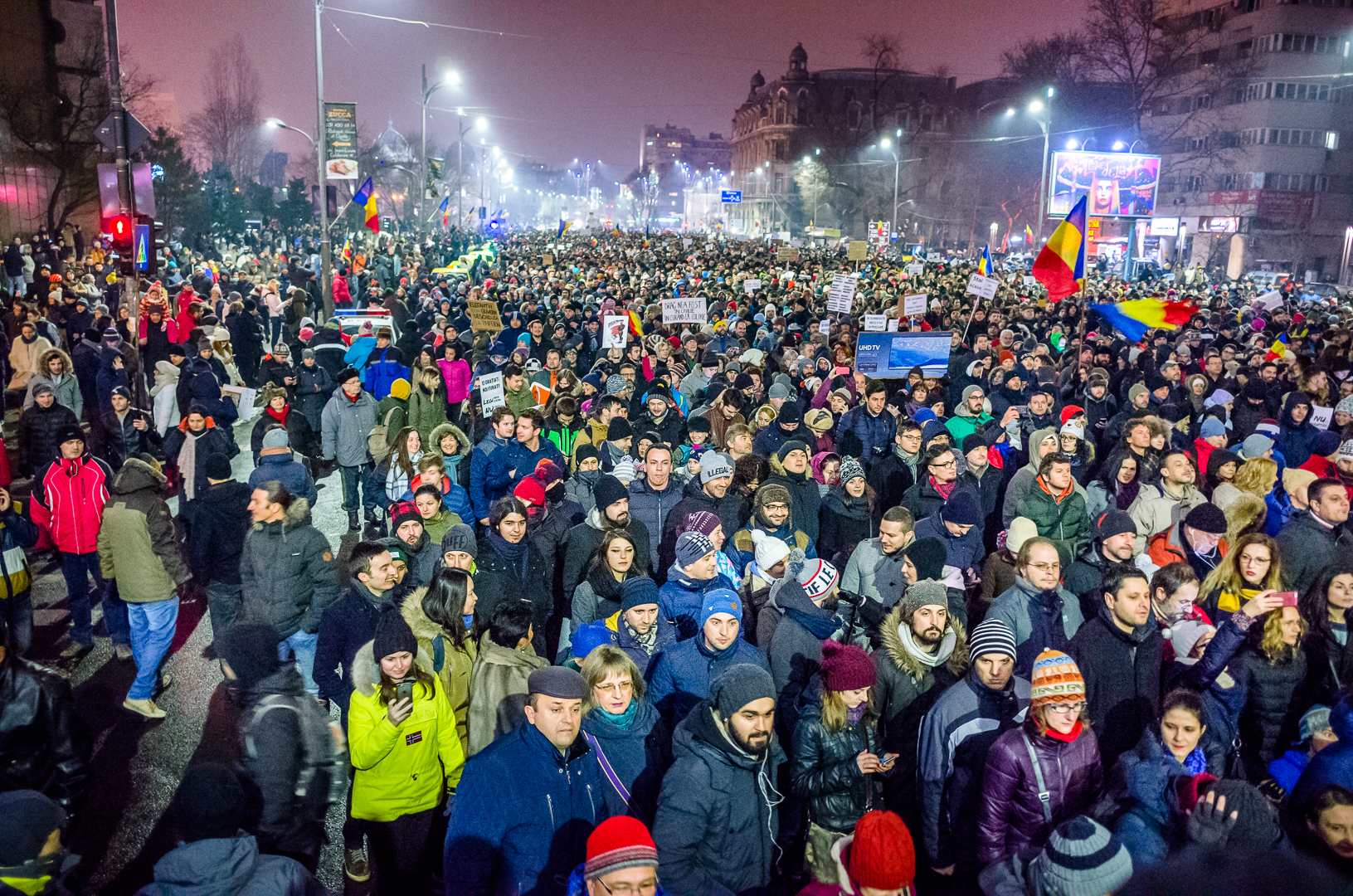
Massive anti-corruption protest in Bucharest in January 2017 against the then-ruling PSD-ALDE socialist government led by former PM Sorin Grindeanu.

The legislative elections of 11 December 2016 saw a predictable comeback of the PSD as the major party in the Romanian Parliament, as most opinion polls gave them an electoral score of at least 40%. Alongside ALDE (a main splinter group from the PNL), the PSD initially formed a governing coalition under Prime Minister Sorin Grindeanu.

In early 2017, a series of massive nationwide protests (the greatest in Romania's history) requested Grindeanu's resignation and early elections because of the government's secret procedure of giving an ordinance modifying the Penal Code and Penal Procedure Code on the night of 31 January. The PM along with the entire government refused to step down but decided to withdraw the decrees that started the protests on 5 February at the protests' peak.

Approximately four months later, tensions arose between PM Sorin Grindeanu and PSD leader Liviu Dragnea, which ultimately resulted in the loss of political support for the government on behalf of the PSD-ALDE coalition. The PM refused to resign but was eventually dismissed by a motion of no confidence passed by the Parliament with 241 votes (233 minimum needed).

Quickly afterward, Mihai Tudose was proposed by the socialists for the position of prime minister and was subsequently accepted by president Iohannis. However, just after 6 months of governance, he resigned from this dignity. Consequently, the ruling coalition nominated a new prime minister candidate in the person of Viorica Dăncilă, a former socialist MEP in 2014–19 who was also accepted by the state president. She was also the first female prime minister of Romania. Subsequently, on 4 November 2019, after a motion of no confidence, the PSD minority government was replaced by a minority cabinet led by the National Liberal Party under Ludovic Orban. Furthermore, in November 2019, President Klaus Iohannis was re-elected by a landslide (with FDGR/DFDR, USR PLUS, and PMP support in the second round).

This period (i.e. the two years spanning between 2017 and 2019) was marked by governmental mayhem produced by the previous PSD-ALDE ruling coalition regarding their change of PMs as well as their intentions of changing both the Penal Code and the Penal Procedure Code, the Romanian society took to the streets of Bucharest and many other major cities of the country in huge numbers for more than 500 consecutive days in order to oppose the modification of these law packages, prompt early elections, as well as a referendum on the topic of justice.

=== 2020–2024 ===
The 2020 Romanian local elections which were held on 27 September were won by the PNL. Nonetheless, on 6 December, the PNL finished second in the 2020 Romanian legislative election. The election was won by the oppositional Social Democrats (PSD) who came in first. Shortly after the official results came out, Orban resigned from his position as PM and was replaced by Nicolae Ciucă as acting/ad interim PM.

In the meantime, the national liberals proceeded to negotiate the formation of a coalition government alongside USR PLUS and UDMR for a reportedly stable center-right governance for the next four years in Romania. The newly designated PM was therefore Florin Cîțu, a member of the National Liberal Party (PNL), who took office on 23 December 2020, after forming a three-party, center-right coalition consisting of the PNL, the USR PLUS, and the Democratic Alliance of Hungarians in Romania (UDMR/RMDSZ).

Subsequently, in early September 2021, USR PLUS decided to exit the Cîțu Cabinet and so the three centre-right party alliance was officially disbanded, inadvertently leading to the major 2021 Romanian political crisis which lasted for nearly three months, until Nicolae Ciucă was invested PM along with the CNR cabinet in late November 2021. On 15 June 2023, Marcel Ciolacu (PSD) was sworn in as the new Romanian prime minister. Rotating premiership had been long agreed as part of a deal by the ruling coalition. Since the investment of the CNR cabinet, Romania has been experiencing a clear shift towards authoritarianism, illiberalism and has the characteristics of a hybrid regime behind a constitutional facade.

=== 2024–present ===
In 2024, all 4 types of elections took place in Romania, a first in the post-December history of the country. European Parliament election and the local election took place simultaneously on June 9, the European Parliament election being won by the PSD-PNL Alliance, and the local ones by the Social Democratic Party (which ran separately from the liberals in most counties). The European Parliament and local elections also provided positive results for the nationalist parties such as the Alliance for the Union of Romanians (AUR) which sent 5 MEPs to the European Parliament and the more radical formation S.O.S. Romania which sent 2 MEPs. Also, in these elections, AUR strengthened its position in the territory by winning important seats in the county and local councils. Also, the simultaneous organization of the 2 elections on the same day was also met with problems and reports related to electoral fraud, the biggest scandals that came to the surface after the election were in sector 1 and sector 2 of Bucharest.

The first round of the 2024 presidential election was held on 24 November, with independent candidate Călin Georgescu winning the first round with 22.9% and USR candidate Elena Lasconi finishing second with 19.2%. After accusations of Russian interference in the election, the CCR called on 28 November for a recount of all 1st round votes, after which it validated the results five days later. However, the CCR reversed its validation on 6 December following new CSAT documents declassified by Iohannis two days previously.

The 2024 parliamentary election took place on 1 December. They took place within a relatively tense context and polarization in society as a result of the events that followed the 1st round of the presidential elections on 24 November such as the anti-extremism demonstrations and the counter-demonstrations of Călin Georgescu's supporters. The parliamentary election were won by the ruling social-democrats, but with a lower score compared to the previous election in 2020. The official results indicated a hung parliament that requires the formation of a broad governing coalition for a stable majority. In the first days after the parliamentary election, there was discussion about the formation of a cordon sanitaire to isolate the so-called sovereignist block (consisting of the parties AUR, SOS RO and POT) and the formation of a stable pro-European coalition formed by PSD, PNL, USR, UDMR and ethnic minority parties. As a result of the annulment of the first round of presidential election, REPER requested the Central Electoral Office to annul the parliamentary election emphasizing that the reasons that led to the decision of the CCR are also valid for the parliamentary election. Vlad Gheorghe, the leader of the party DREPT, also called for the annulment of the parliamentary elections citing (the same "causes"): "Russian interference", "manipulation and disinformation of the population”.

Meanwhile, the negotiations between PSD, PNL, USR and UDMR have reached an impasse, USR making several requests to the potential coalition partners such as tax cuts, the resignation of the president Klaus Iohannis, the rapid adoption of the new budget, the start of the procedures for the initiation of the referendum "no convicted criminals from holding public office" and the resignation of the heads of the intelligence services. In the end, the USR stayed out of the negotiations on the future governing coalition thus the return of the old PSD-PNL-UDMR-minorities formula that was between 2021 and 2023 during the Ciucă Cabinet materialized. On 23 December 2024, the new government was invested with a fragile majority (a little over 50%), Second Ciolacu cabinet. In January 2025, the 2025 presidential election was scheduled for May. In the runoff on 18 May, Nicușor Dan defeated George Simion, with his presidency beginning on 26 May 2025.

== Foreign relations ==
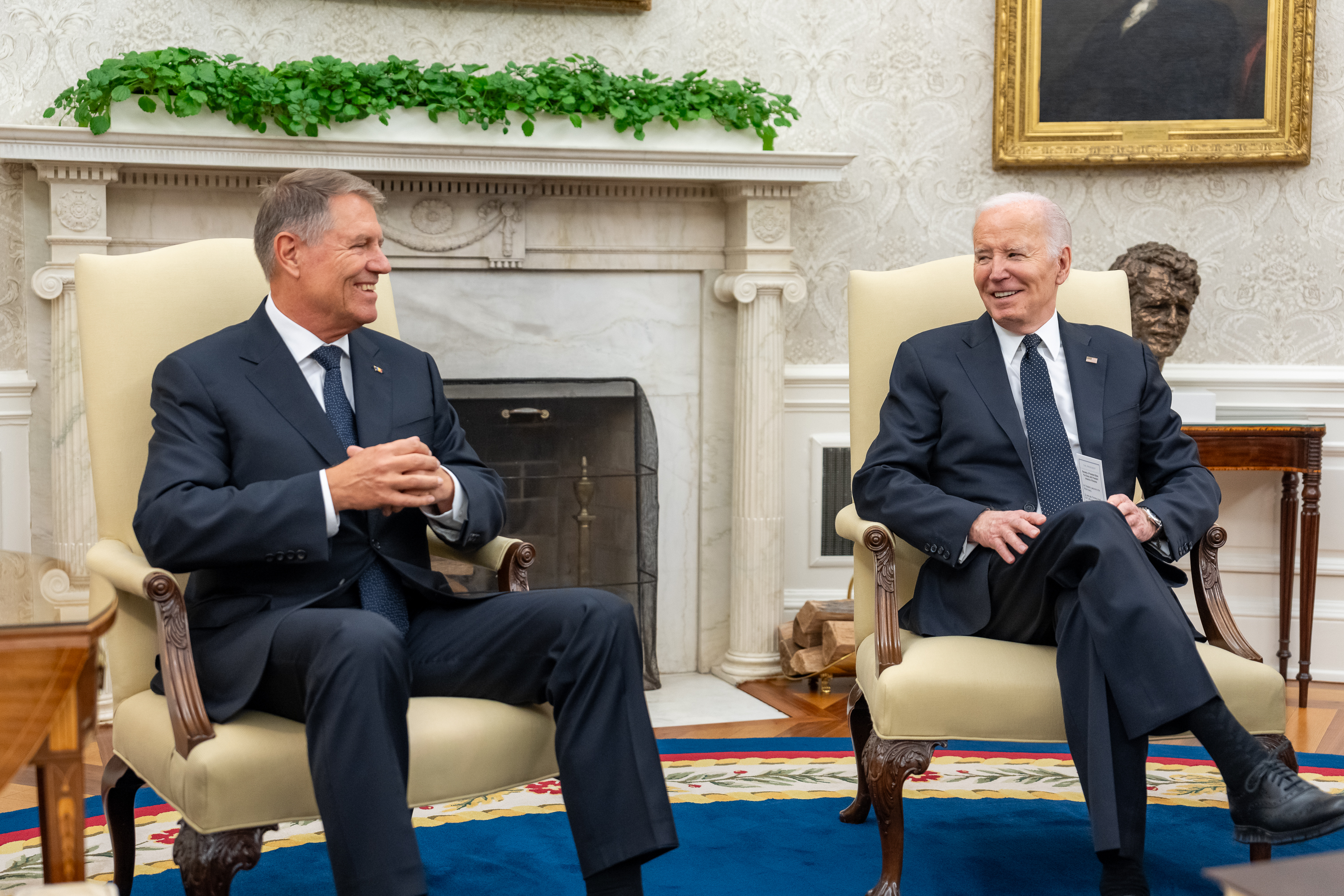
Romanian president Klaus Iohannis with U.S. president Joe Biden in the Oval Office, May 2024

On 1 January 2007, Romania became a member of the European Union (EU) in the fifth wave of EU enlargement. During the 2000s, Romania implemented a number of reforms to prepare for EU accession, including the consolidation of its democratic systems, the institution of the rule of law, the acknowledgement of respect for human rights, the commitment to personal freedom of expression, and the implementation of a functioning free-market economy.

Romania joined the North Atlantic Treaty Organization (NATO) on 29 March 2004, following the decision taken at the Prague Summit, in November 2002. Romania was a partner to the allied forces during the Gulf War, particularly during its service as president of the UN Security Council. Romania has been active in peacekeeping operations in UNAVEM in Angola, IFOR/SFOR in Bosnia, Albania, in Afghanistan and sent 860 troops to Iraq after the invasion led by the United States.

Romania has developed strong relations with Hungary, with the latter playing a key role in supporting Romania's bid to join the EU. Romania's ethnic Hungarian party also participated in all the government coalitions between 1996 and 2008 and from 2009. In 1996, Romania signed and ratified a basic bilateral treaty with Hungary that settled outstanding disagreements, laying the foundation for closer, more cooperative relations.

Bulgarian relations with Romania feature regular official visits by the two presidents. In the first half of the 20th century, Romania and Bulgaria had a serious conflict over the Dobruja region. This dispute, while now largely forgotten, escalated into all out war in 1913. The territorial dispute between the two countries ended with the Treaty of Craiova.

== See also ==
- Mass media in Romania
- Human rights in Romania
- Military of Romania
- Relations of Romania with Moldova
- Movement for unification of Romania and Moldova
