= Elections in Romania =

Elections held in Romania

Romania elects on a national level a head of state – the president – and a legislature. The president is elected for a five-year term (after a change from four-year terms after the 2004 election). The Romanian Parliament (Romanian: Parlamentul României) has two chambers. The Chamber of Deputies (Romanian: Camera Deputaţilor) currently has 331 members (after the last legislative elections), elected for a four-year term by party-list proportional representation on closed lists. The Senate (Romanian: Senatul) currently has 134 members (after the last legislative elections), elected for a four-year term by party-list proportional representation on closed lists.

Romania has a multi-party system, with numerous parties in which no one party often has a chance of gaining power alone, and parties must work with each other to form coalition governments.

On 25 November 2007, for the first time, Romanians elected their representatives to the European Parliament.

On 6 December 2024, the Constitutional Court annulled the results of the first round of the presidential election, after intelligence documents purporting to show Russian interference were declassified.

== Electoral system ==
=== President ===
The President is elected in a two-round system for a five-year term. Candidates obtaining a majority of 50%+1 of all registered voters in the first round are declared the winner. If none of the candidates achieve this, then a run-off is held between the two contenders with the top scores in the first round. The candidate who obtains any majority of votes in the run-off is declared the winner.

The term of the president is five years. Between 1992 and 2004 the term was of four years, but was increased following the 2003 Constitutional referendum. One person can serve a maximum of two terms, that may be consecutive.

In order to be able to run for the Office of President a candidate must fulfill the following conditions: be a Romanian citizen, be at least 35 years of age (at least on the day of the election), and not have held the office for two terms since 1992, when the 1991 Constitution took effect.

=== Parliament ===
The former (2008-2012) electoral colleges of the constituencies for the Chamber of Deputies

The former (2008-2012) electoral colleges of the constituencies for the Senate

The Chamber of Deputies and the Senate are elected in constituencies, by universal, equal, direct, secret, and freely expressed suffrage, on the basis of a list system and independent candidatures, according to the principle of closed party list proportional representation. The option for an identical election system of the two Chambers of Parliament confers them the same legitimacy, as both of them are the expression of the will of the same electoral body.

The two Chambers have different numbers of members: the Chamber of Deputies is composed of 331 Deputies, and the Senate of 136 Senators. This differentiation is possible owing to the legal provision of a representation norm differing from one Chamber to the other and due to the seats allotted to the national minorities (a seat in the Chamber of Deputies for each minority) and to the Romanians living abroad (4 seats in the Chamber and 2 in the Senate). Thus, for the election of the Chamber of Deputies the representation norm is of one Deputy to 73,000 inhabitants, and for the election of the Senate, of one Senator to 168,000 inhabitants.

The number of Deputies and Senators to be elected in each constituency is determined on the basis of the representation norm, by relating the number of inhabitants in each constituency to the representation norm. There are 43 constituencies: 1 for each county and the Municipality of Bucharest, and 1 for the Romanians living abroad. In a constituency, the number of Deputies cannot be less than four, and that of Senators, less than two. The number of inhabitants taken into account is that existing on 1 January of the previous year, published in the Statistical Yearbook of Romania. If, at least five months before the election date, a general census has taken place, the number of inhabitants taken into account is that resulting from the census.

The electoral threshold is for parties or candidates running individually 5% on national level or 20% in at least 4 constituencies, and 8-10% for coalitions or electoral alliances.

The Constitution of Romania and the Election Law grant to legally constituted organizations of citizens belonging to national minorities, in case these could not obtain at the election at least one Deputy or Senator mandate, the right to a Deputy mandate, if they have obtained throughout the country a number of votes equal to at least 5% out of the average number of votes validly expressed throughout the country for the election of one Deputy.

The mandates assigned, under the conditions of the Election Law, to organizations of citizens belonging to national minorities are added to the Deputy mandates resulted from the representation norm.

=== European Parliament ===
To elect the 33 MEPs (35 MEPs between 2007 and 2009, 32 between 2014 and 2019), Romania is considered a single constituency. The system used is closed party list proportional representation, with a 5% threshold of the votes.

=== Local elections ===
To elect the mayors the first past the post is used since 2012. The candidate who wins most of the votes is declared elected. A runoff is organised if the top two candidates have an equal number of votes.

For the office of Presidents of the County Councils, between 2008 and 2012, and again since 2024, the first pass the post system was used. Until 2008 and again since 2016, the County Council Presidents have been indirectly elected by each County Council.

To elect the Local, and County Councils, the closed party list proportional representation, with a 5% threshold of the votes at the constituency level (city, commune or county).

== Voting procedures ==
Irrespective of the type of election, the vote is done by using paper and manual counting. The voter is required to prove his/hers identity using the Identity card (or the previous version, the Identity bulletin), or, for special reasons, the military ID or the passport. After (s)he signs in the permanent, supplemental, or special electoral list, (s)he is handed a voting ballot (buletin de vot) and a stamp that reads VOTAT YYYY TTT (voted); YYYY stands for the year the election is held, and TTT for the type of elections to be held: L for local elections (including partial), P presidential elections, PE for European Parliament election, R for referendums (R.V.U. was used in 2007). For the general election, up to now, there was no additional type indicator, as it is granted most importance.

For the local and parliamentary elections, the voter can vote only at the polling station where (s)he has the permanent address (domiciliu), or the temporary residence (flotant) at least three months old. For the local election, the Romanians outside Romania cannot vote. For the parliamentary election they vote the candidates for the 43rd constituency. For the European Parliament and presidential elections the voters can vote at a different pooling station than the local and parliamentary elections, but only if (s)he is not in the home-town the voting day. Since the 2016 legislative election the Romanian electors residing abroad will be able to cast their vote via mail.

The voting ballot is printed on newspaper paper, monochrome. All the candidates (or the full candidate list) are listed in a lottery type established order (first the parliamentary parties, than the non-parliamentary parties, and at the end, the independent candidates), each in a clearly designated rectangular that consists of the full party/alliance name and logo, and the full candidate name (or full list of candidates' names). Voters express their choice by stamping the rectangle of the party or independent candidate (s)he wishes to vote for. For referendums the same voting procedure is used. Each of the two options (YES – DA and NO – NU) are in a 5×5 cm square, YES on top and NO at the bottom, and the question voted for in the middle of the voting ballot.

== Fairness ==
Freedom House in 2024 wrote that the legal framework "generally provides for fair and competitive elections". According to the Bertelsmann Transformation Index in 2024, Romanian elections "are generally free and fair, with occasional evidence of fraud, unethical campaigning or voter manipulation, especially in poor rural areas."

Electoral irregularities and political clientelism have been documented in multiple Romanian elections. According to Politico in 2025, some local politicians have engaged in vote buying or threats to cut off constituents' income in order to get votes, and while this is illegal, "authorities have often turned a blind eye". A notable conviction for election fraud was that of Social Democratic Party minister Liviu Dragnea in 2015.

== Recent elections ==
=== Election schedule ===
Election type	Date	Second round date
Local	June 9, 2024	—N/a
Legislative	December 1, 2024	—N/a
European	June 9, 2024	—N/a
Presidential	May 4, 2025	May 18, 2025

== Latest elections ==
Electoral performance of candidates from the PSD, PNL and PD/PDL in the first round of Romanian presidential elections, 2000─2024

=== Presidential ===
Candidate	Party	First round		Second round	
Candidate	Party	Votes	%	Votes	%
George Simion	Alliance for the Union of Romanians	3,862,761	40.96	5,339,053	46.40
Nicușor Dan	Independent	1,979,767	20.99	6,168,642	53.60
Crin Antonescu	Romania Forward Electoral Alliance	1,892,930	20.07		
Victor Ponta	Independent	1,230,164	13.04		
Elena Lasconi	Save Romania Union	252,721	2.68		
Lavinia Șandru	Social Liberal Humanist Party	60,682	0.64		
Daniel Funeriu	Independent	49,604	0.53		
Cristian Terheș	Romanian National Conservative Party	36,445	0.39		
Sebastian Popescu	New Romania Party	25,994	0.28		
John Ion Banu	Independent	22,020	0.23		
Silviu Predoiu	National Action League Party	17,186	0.18		
Total		9,430,274	100.00	11,507,695	100.00
Valid votes		9,430,274	98.52	11,507,695	98.85
Invalid/blank votes		141,466	1.48	134,171	1.15
Total votes		9,571,740	100.00	11,641,866	100.00
Registered voters/turnout		17,988,031	53.21	17,988,218	64.72
Source: Permanent Electoral Authority

=== European Parliament ===
Party	Votes	%	Seats	+/–
PSD–PNL Alliance	4,341,686	48.55	19	–
AUR Alliance	1,334,905	14.93	6	New
United Right Alliance	778,901	8.71	3	–
Democratic Alliance of Hungarians in Romania	579,180	6.48	2	–
S.O.S. Romania	450,040	5.03	2	New
Renewing Romania's European Project	334,703	3.74	0	New
United Diaspora Party	159,943	1.79	0	New
Social Liberal Humanist Party	132,402	1.48	0	New
Patriots Party	65,440	0.73	0	New
Greater Romania Party	59,272	0.66	0	–
The Right Alternative	40,281	0.45	0	New
Socialist Romania Alliance (PSR–PSDM)	37,119	0.42	0	–
Independents	628,754	7.03	1	–
Total	8,942,626	100.00	33	+1
Valid votes	8,942,626	94.82		
Invalid/blank votes	488,551	5.18		
Total votes	9,431,177	100.00		
Registered voters/turnout	18,025,329	52.32		
Source: BEC

=== Legislative ===
The incumbent National Coalition for Romania (PSD and PNL) lost their majority in both chambers in the election, with far-right parties (AUR, SOS RO, and POT) making substantial gains at their expense.

==== Chamber of Deputies ====
Party	Votes	%	Seats	+/–
Social Democratic Party	2,030,144	21.96	86	–24
Alliance for the Union of Romanians	1,665,143	18.01	63	+30
National Liberal Party	1,219,810	13.20	49	–44
Save Romania Union	1,146,357	12.40	40	–15
S.O.S. Romania	679,967	7.36	28	New
Party of Young People	596,745	6.46	24	New
Democratic Alliance of Hungarians in Romania	585,397	6.33	22	+1
Health Education Nature Sustainability Party	276,494	2.99	0	New
Force of the Right (Note: Alliance of Liberal-Conservative Right Forces)	189,678	2.05	0	New
United Social Democratic Party	177,137	1.92	0	New
Renewing Romania's European Project (Note: Platform for Democracy, Prosperity, and Progress)	114,223	1.24	0	New
Justice and Respect in Europe for All Party	107,474	1.16	0	New
Romanian National Conservative Party	45,687	0.49	0	New
Patriots of the Romanian People	40,960	0.44	0	0
Romanian Ecologist Party	34,641	0.37	0	0
Independent Social Democratic Party	33,372	0.36	0	0
Romania in Action Party	28,504	0.31	0	New
National Christian Alliance	25,789	0.28	0	0
New Romania Party	14,107	0.15	0	0
Party of the Roma "Pro Europa"	13,881	0.15	1	0
Association of Macedonians of Romania	13,800	0.15	1	0
Socialist Romania Alliance	12,849	0.14	0	0
League of Albanians of Romania	9,177	0.10	1	0
Union of the Ukrainians of Romania	8,750	0.09	1	0
Democratic Forum of Germans in Romania	8,577	0.09	1	0
Union of Serbs of Romania	7,962	0.09	1	0
Alternative for National Dignity	7,747	0.08	0	0
Hellenic Union of Romania	7,565	0.08	1	0
Community of the Lipovan Russians in Romania	7,434	0.08	1	0
Democratic Union of Slovaks and Czechs of Romania	7,420	0.08	1	0
Federation of the Jewish Communities in Romania	5,281	0.06	1	0
Bulgarian Union of Banat–Romania	5,089	0.06	1	0
Democratic Union of Turkic-Muslim Tatars of Romania	4,908	0.05	1	0
Union of Armenians of Romania	4,747	0.05	1	0
Cultural Union of Ruthenians of Romania	4,571	0.05	1	0
Democratic Turkish Union of Romania	4,547	0.05	1	0
Union of Croats of Romania	4,413	0.05	1	0
Union of Poles of Romania "Dom Polski"	4,215	0.05	1	0
Association of Italians of Romania	4,128	0.04	1	0
National Action League Party	2,912	0.03	0	New
Forum of Czechs in Romania	2,817	0.03	1	+1
Party of Faithful People	1,143	0.01	0	0
Geto-Dacian Union Party	435	0.00	0	0
Patria Party	391	0.00	0	0
Republican Party of Romania	279	0.00	0	0
Christian Democratic National Peasants' Party	270	0.00	0	0
Green Party	248	0.00	0	0
United Pensioners' Party	229	0.00	0	0
Party of Justice	184	0.00	0	0
Independents	76,043	0.82	0	0
Total	9,243,641	100.00	331	+1
Valid votes	9,243,641	98.17		
Invalid/blank votes	171,877	1.83		
Total votes	9,415,518	100.00		
Registered voters/turnout	19,503,273	48.28		
Source: Permanent Electoral Authority; Seat counts

==== Senate ====
Party	Votes	%	Seats	+/–
Social Democratic Party	2,065,087	22.30	36	–11
Alliance for the Union of Romanians	1,694,705	18.30	28	+14
National Liberal Party	1,322,468	14.28	22	–19
Save Romania Union	1,134,831	12.26	19	–6
S.O.S. Romania	718,409	7.76	12	New
Party of Young People	591,927	6.39	7	New
Democratic Alliance of Hungarians in Romania	590,783	6.38	10	+1
Health Education Nature Sustainability Party	263,173	2.84	0	New
Force of the Right (Note: Alliance of Liberal-Conservative Right Forces)	173,703	1.88	0	New
United Social Democratic Party	164,659	1.78	0	New
Renewing Romania's European Project (Note: Platform for Democracy, Prosperity, and Progress)	126,408	1.37	0	New
Justice and Respect in Europe for All Party	114,500	1.24	0	New
Romanian National Conservative Party	50,287	0.54	0	New
Patriots of the Romanian People	48,436	0.52	0	0
Independent Social Democratic Party	41,712	0.45	0	0
Romanian Ecologist Party	38,561	0.42	0	0
National Christian Alliance	31,094	0.34	0	0
Romania in Action Party	30,252	0.33	0	New
New Romania Party	17,203	0.19	0	0
Socialist Romania Alliance	16,256	0.18	0	0
Alternative for National Dignity	10,473	0.11	0	0
National Action League Party	3,838	0.04	0	New
Party of Faithful People	806	0.01	0	0
Patria Party	493	0.01	0	0
Geto-Dacian Union Party	480	0.01	0	0
Christian Democratic National Peasants' Party	371	0.00	0	0
Party of Justice	325	0.00	0	0
Republican Party of Romania	314	0.00	0	0
Green Party	290	0.00	0	0
Phralipe Party of the Roma	287	0.00	0	0
Independents	7,826	0.08	0	0
Total	9,259,957	100.00	134	0
Valid votes	9,259,957	98.41		
Invalid/blank votes	149,557	1.59		
Total votes	9,409,514	100.00		
Registered voters/turnout	19,503,273	48.25		
Source: Permanent Electoral Authority; Seat counts

=== Local ===
Political party/alliance		County-level				U.A.T.-level			
Political party/alliance		County Council Presidents		County Council Councilors		Mayors		Local Council Councilors	
PSD		25 / 41	▲5	550 / 1,338	▲188	1,691 / 3,180		16,499 / 39,900	▲2679
PNL		12 / 41	▼5	436 / 1,338	▼53	1,144 / 3,180		12,767 / 39,900	▼1415
UDMR / RMDSZ		4 / 41	Steady	104 / 1,338	▲12	200 / 3,180		2,524 / 39,900	▲164
AUR		0 / 41	Steady	159 / 1,338	▲159	30 / 3,180		3,526 / 39,900	▲3447
ADU	USR	0 / 41	Steady	46 / 1,338	▼62	28 / 3,180		832 / 39,900	▼375
ADU	PMP	0 / 41	Steady	17 / 1,338	▼48	6 / 3,180		238 / 39,900	▼1899
ADU	FD	0 / 41	New	17 / 1,338	New	10 / 3,180	New	254 / 39,900	New
FDGR / DFDR		0 / 41	Steady	5 / 1,338	Steady	5 / 3,180		52 / 39,900	▼16
PUSL		0 / 41	Steady	2 / 1,338	▲2	6 / 3,180		225 / 39,900	▲59
AMT / EMSZ		0 / 41	Steady	2 / 1,338	▼5	4 / 3,180		172 / 39,900	▼134
REPER		0 / 41	New	0 / 1,338	New	2 / 3,180	New	54 / 39,900	New
AER	PER	0 / 41	Steady	0 / 1,338	▼5	1 / 3,180		79 / 39,900	▼295
AER	PV	0 / 41	Steady	0 / 1,338	Steady	0 / 3,180		38 / 39,900	▼79
Romania in Action		0 / 41	Steady	0 / 1,338	▼2	1 / 3,180	▲1	48 / 39,900	▲21
UIPS		0 / 41	Steady	0 / 1,338	Steady	1 / 3,180	Steady	TBD	
PPR		0 / 41	New	0 / 1,338	New	1 / 3,180	New	TBD	New
BSR		0 / 41	New	0 / 1,338	New	1 / 3,180	New	TBD	New
UUR		0 / 41	Steady	0 / 1,338	Steady	1 / 3,180	Steady	TBD	
UDSCR		0 / 41	Steady	0 / 1,338	Steady	1 / 3,180	Steady	TBD	
PRPE		0 / 41	Steady	0 / 1,338	Steady	1 / 3,180	▲1	TBD	
FCM / MPE		0 / 41	New	0 / 1,338	New	1 / 3,180	New	TBD	New
SOS RO		0 / 41	New	0 / 1,338	New	0 / 3,180	New	149 / 39,900	New
PRO		0 / 41	Steady	0 / 1,338	▼56	0 / 3,176	▼36	111 / 39,900	▼1774
PRM		0 / 41	Steady	0 / 1,338	Steady	0 / 3,180		22 / 39,900	▼9
POL		0 / 41	Steady	0 / 1,338	▼2	0 / 3,180		5 / 39,900	▼30
AD		0 / 41	Steady	0 / 1,338	Steady	0 / 3,180		4 / 39,900	▼9
Curaj		0 / 41	New	0 / 1,338	New	0 / 3,180	New	3 / 39,900	New
Demos		0 / 41	New	0 / 1,338	New	0 / 3,180	New	1 / 39,900	New
Independents		0 / 41		0 / 1,338		43 / 3,180		0 / 39,900	

== Referendums ==
The Constitution of Romania defines that a referendum has to be called to:

- suspend the President from office (article 95), or
- amend the Constitution (article 151)

Moreover, the Constitution defines that a referendum can be called on matters of national interest by the President of Romania after consultation with Parliament (article 90).

There were 8 referendums (and 1 local one) in post-communist Romania:

- 2 constitutional referendums: in 1991 and 2003
- 2 presidential impeachment referendums: in May 2007 and in 2012
- voting system referendum in November 2007
- parliamentary reform referendum in 2009
- referendum regarding the definition of family and another one only in the Olt County to rename it to "Olt-Romanați County" in 2018 at the same time
- referendum about justice and corruption in 2019

There was also 1 referendum in the Socialist Republic of Romania, 3 referendums in the Kingdom of Romania and 2 referendums in the Romanian United Principalities.

== See also ==
- Electoral calendar
- Electoral system
