= Bratstvo Community of Bulgarians in Romania =

The Bratstvo Community of Bulgarians in Romania (Bulgarian: Общността „Братство” на българите в Румъния; Romanian: Comunitatea Bratstvo a Bulgarilor din Romania, CBBR) was an ethnic minority political party in Romania representing the Bulgarian community.

== History ==
The CBBR contested the 1996 general elections and defeated the Bulgarian Union of Banat–Romania to win the seat reserved for the Bulgarian community in the Chamber of Deputies under the electoral law allowing political parties representing ethnic minority groups to be exempt from the electoral threshold only applied as long as they received 10% of the vote required for a single seat in the Chamber of Deputies.

However, the party was defeated by the Bulgarian Union of Banat–Romania in the 2000 elections, losing its seat. It subsequently failed to regain parliamentary representation in the next elections in 2004.

== Electoral history ==
Election	Chamber of Deputies			Senate		
Election	Votes	%	Seats	Votes	%	Seats
1996	5,359	0.04	1	–	–	–
2000	5,923	0.05	0	–	–	–
2004	4,065	0.04	0			
