= Forum of Czechs in Romania =

Forum of Czechs in Romania Forumul Cehilor din Romania Fórum Čechů v Rumunsku
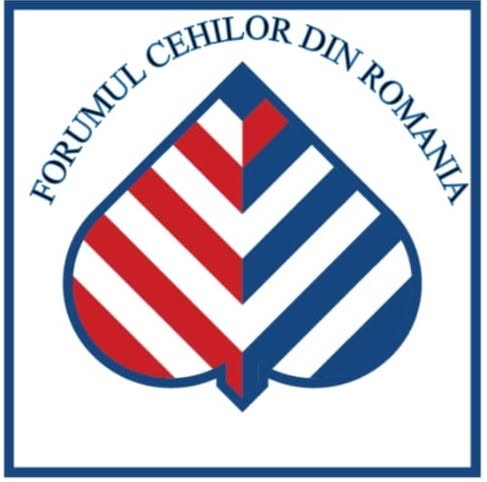
- President: Ştefan Bouda
- Registered: 18 March 2024
- Split from: Democratic Union of Slovaks and Czechs of Romania
- Headquarters: Sfânta Elena 93, Coronini
- Ideology: Czech minority politics
- National affiliation: National Minorities Parliamentary Group
- Chamber of Deputies: 1 / 330
- Senate: 0 / 136
- European Parliament: 0 / 32

The Forum of Czechs in Romania (Romanian: Forumul Cehilor din Romania, FCR; Czech: Fórum Čechů v Rumunsku, FČR) is an ethnic minority political party in Romania representing the Czech community.

== History ==
It won a single seat in the Chamber of Deputies under the electoral law that allows for political parties representing ethnic minority groups to be exempt from the electoral threshold. It has won a seat in every election since, including in the 2024 general elections, when it received 0.03% of the vote. Before this the Czech minority was represented by the Democratic Union of Slovaks and Czechs of Romania.

== Electoral history ==
| Election | Chamber of Deputies | | | Senate | | |
| Election | Votes | % | Seats | Votes | % | Seats |
|---|---|---|---|---|---|---|
| 2024 | 2,817 | 0.03 | 1 | – | – | – |
