= 2007 Romanian electoral system referendum =

- 25 November 2007
- Do you agree that, beginning with the next elections that will be held for the Romanian Parliament, all deputies and senators be elected in single-member constituencies, based on a majority vote in two rounds?
- Outcome: Referendum fails due to low turnout

Results
| Choice | Votes | % |
|---|---|---|
| Yes | 3,947,212 | 83.42% |
| No | 784,640 | 16.58% |
| Valid votes | 4,731,852 | 97.53% |
| Invalid or blank votes | 119,618 | 2.47% |
| Total votes | 4,851,470 | 100.00% |
| Registered voters/turnout | 18,296,459 | 26.52% |
- Yes: 60-70% 70-80% 80-90%

A referendum on changing the parliamentary electoral system to a two-round system was held in Romania on 25 November 2007, on the same date as the European elections. The referendum was called by President Traian Băsescu on 23 October 2007 when the Parliament of Romania failed to meet a deadline set by him to pass these changes.

The precise question was:

Do you agree that, beginning with the next elections that will be held for the Romanian Parliament, all deputies and senators be elected in single-member constituencies, based on a majority vote in two rounds?

While the system proposed by Băsescu would mirror the French two-round electoral system, former National Liberal Party (PNL) Prime Minister Călin Popescu-Tăriceanu proposed a mixed member proportional system based on the German electoral system. The proposed legislation would also reduce the number of MPs by about 20 per cent.

While the Greater Romania Party (PRM) challenged the legality of holding the referendum at the same time as the EP election, the Constitutional Court of Romania decided on November 7 that it was not illegal.

== Results ==
Although 81% of voters were in favour of the proposal, the low turnout of 26% meant that the referendum was invalid. Thus, the MMP proposal of PM Tăriceanu was used at the next elections instead.

| Choice | Votes | % |
|---|---|---|
| For | 3,947,212 | 83.42 |
| Against | 784,640 | 16.58 |
| Total | 4,731,852 | 100.00 |
| Valid votes | 4,731,852 | 97.53 |
| Invalid/blank votes | 119,618 | 2.47 |
| Total votes | 4,851,470 | 100.00 |
| Registered voters/turnout | 18,296,459 | 26.52 |
Source: Biroul Electoral Central
