= 2016 Romanian parliamentary election =

- 11 December 2016

All 136 seats in the Senate All 329 seats in the Chamber of Deputies 69 S and 165 D seats needed for a majority
- Registered: 18,403,044
- Turnout: 39.46% (▼2.30 pp)
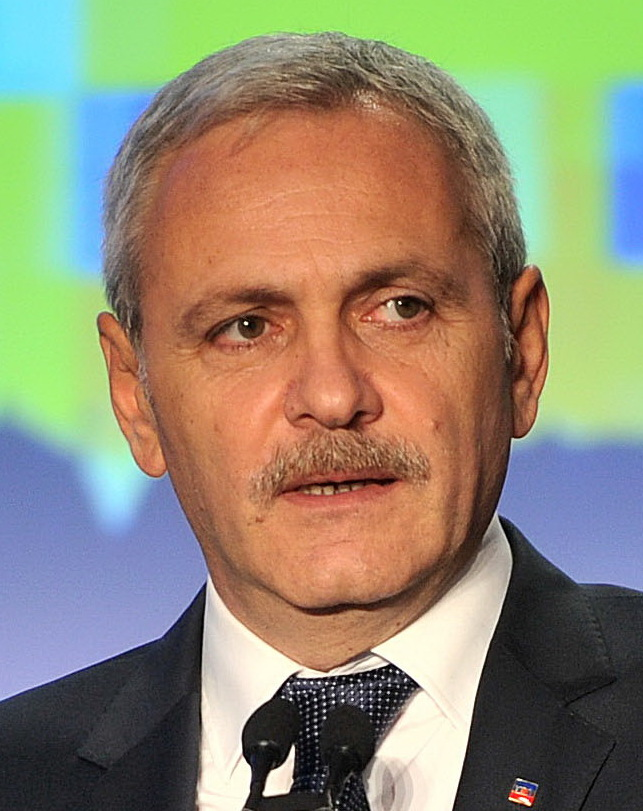

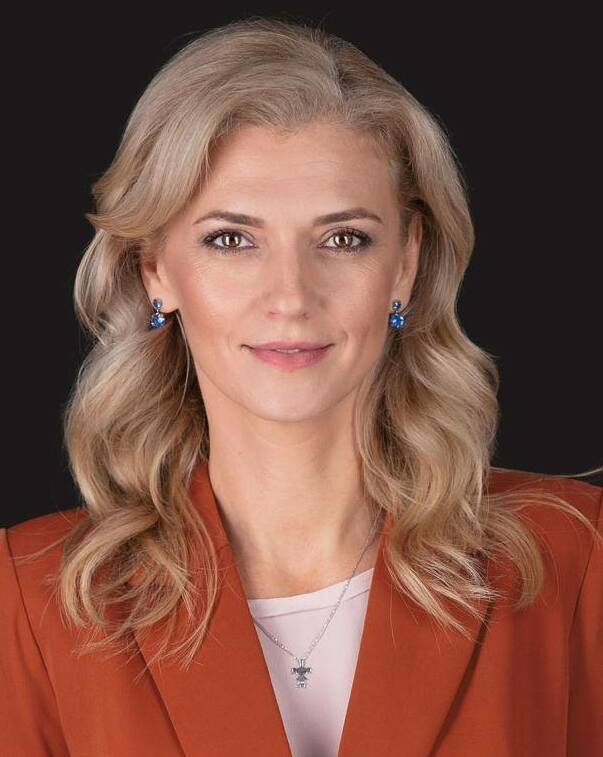

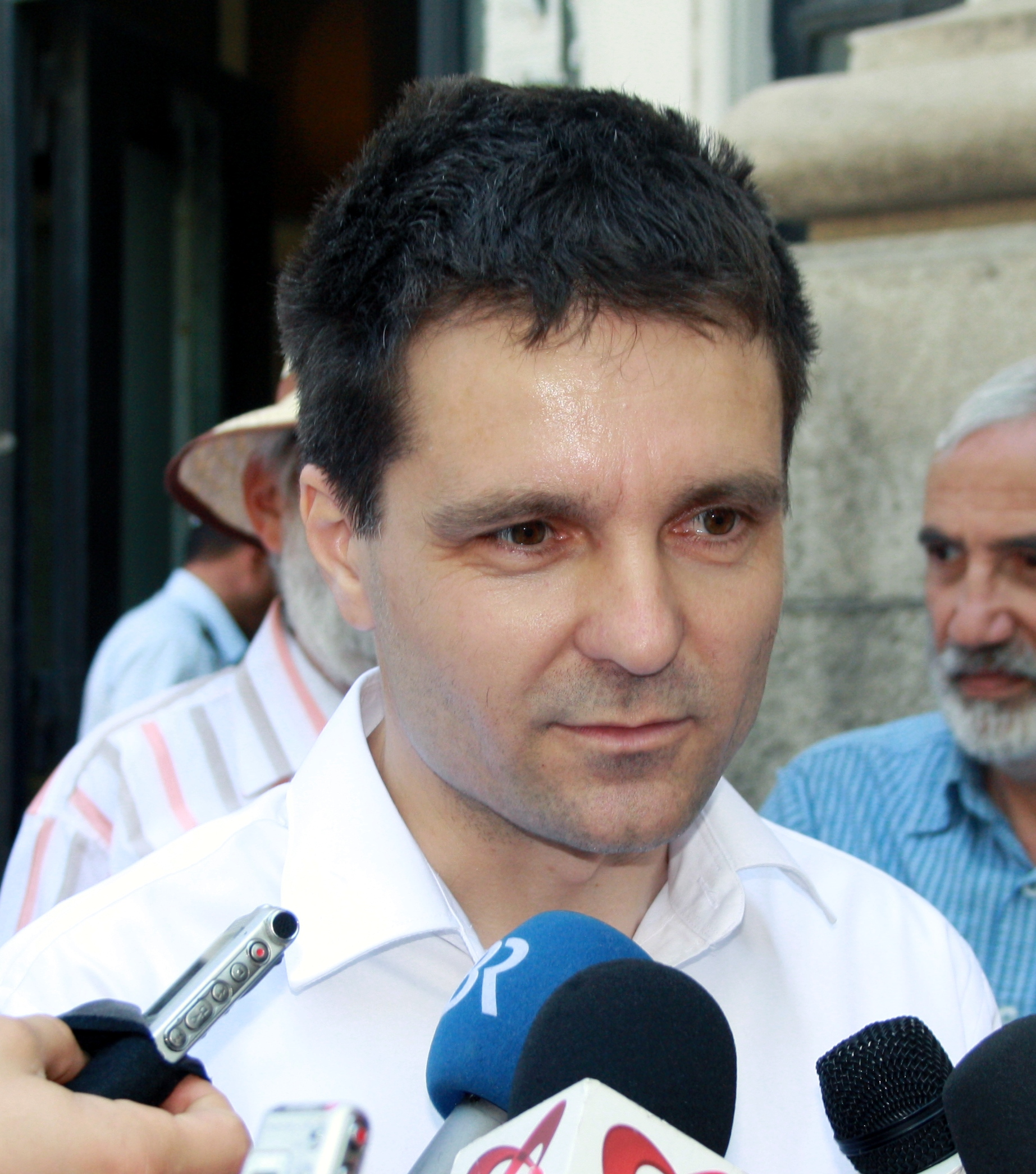

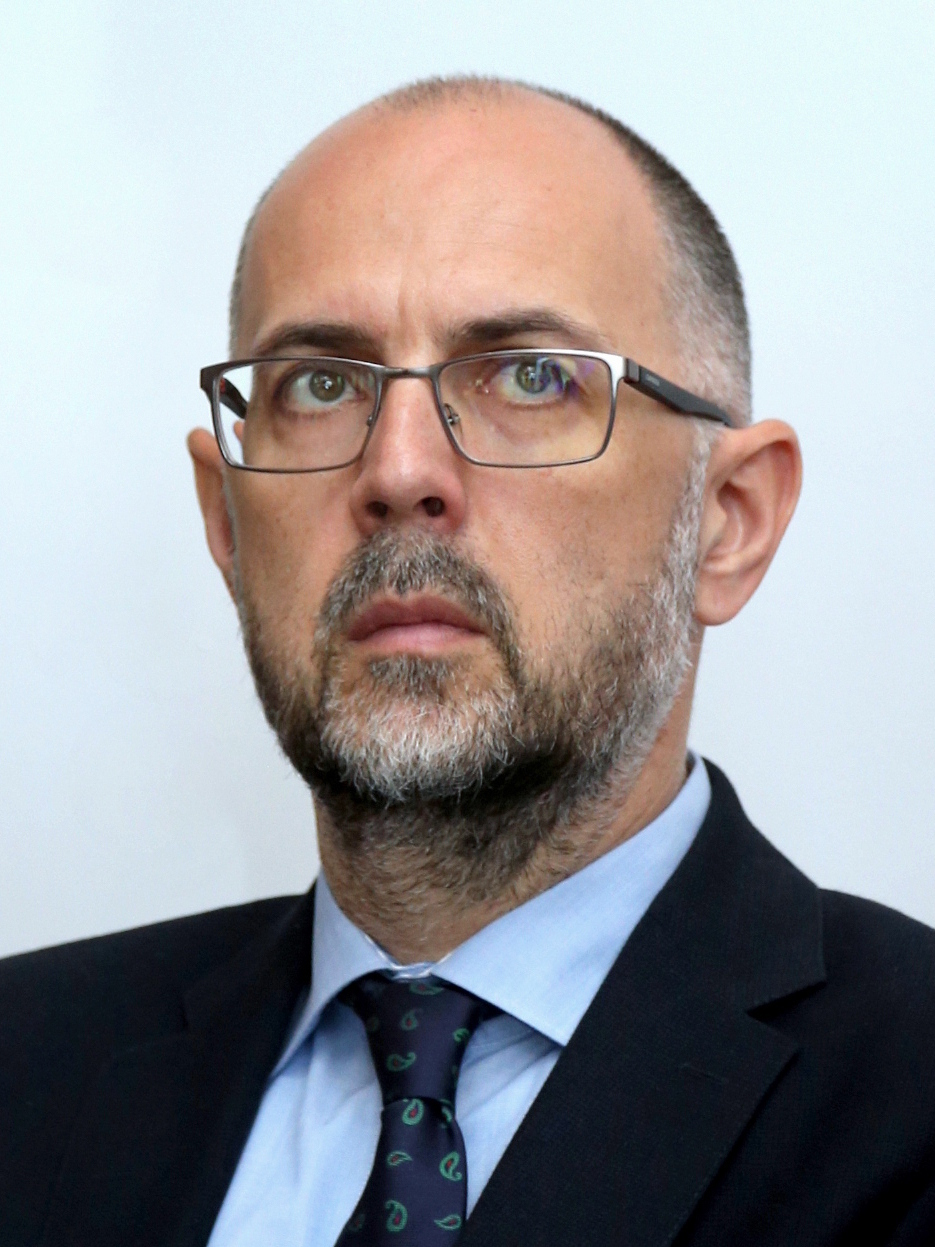

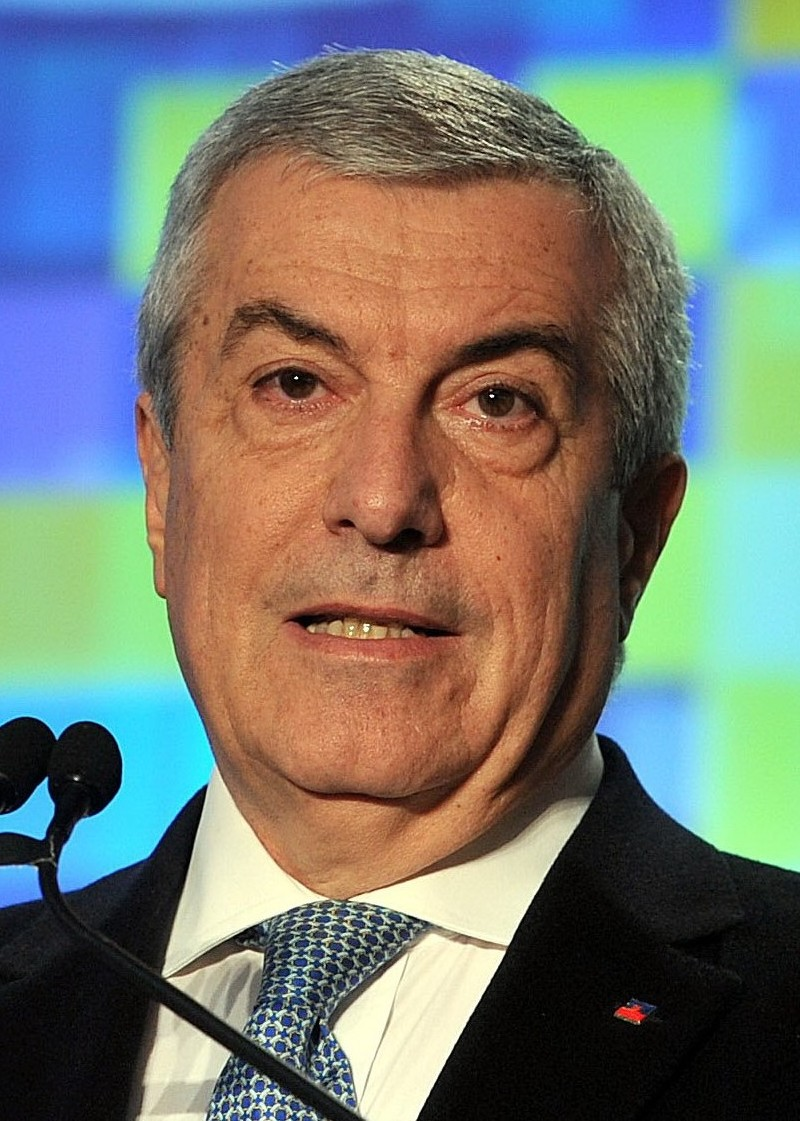

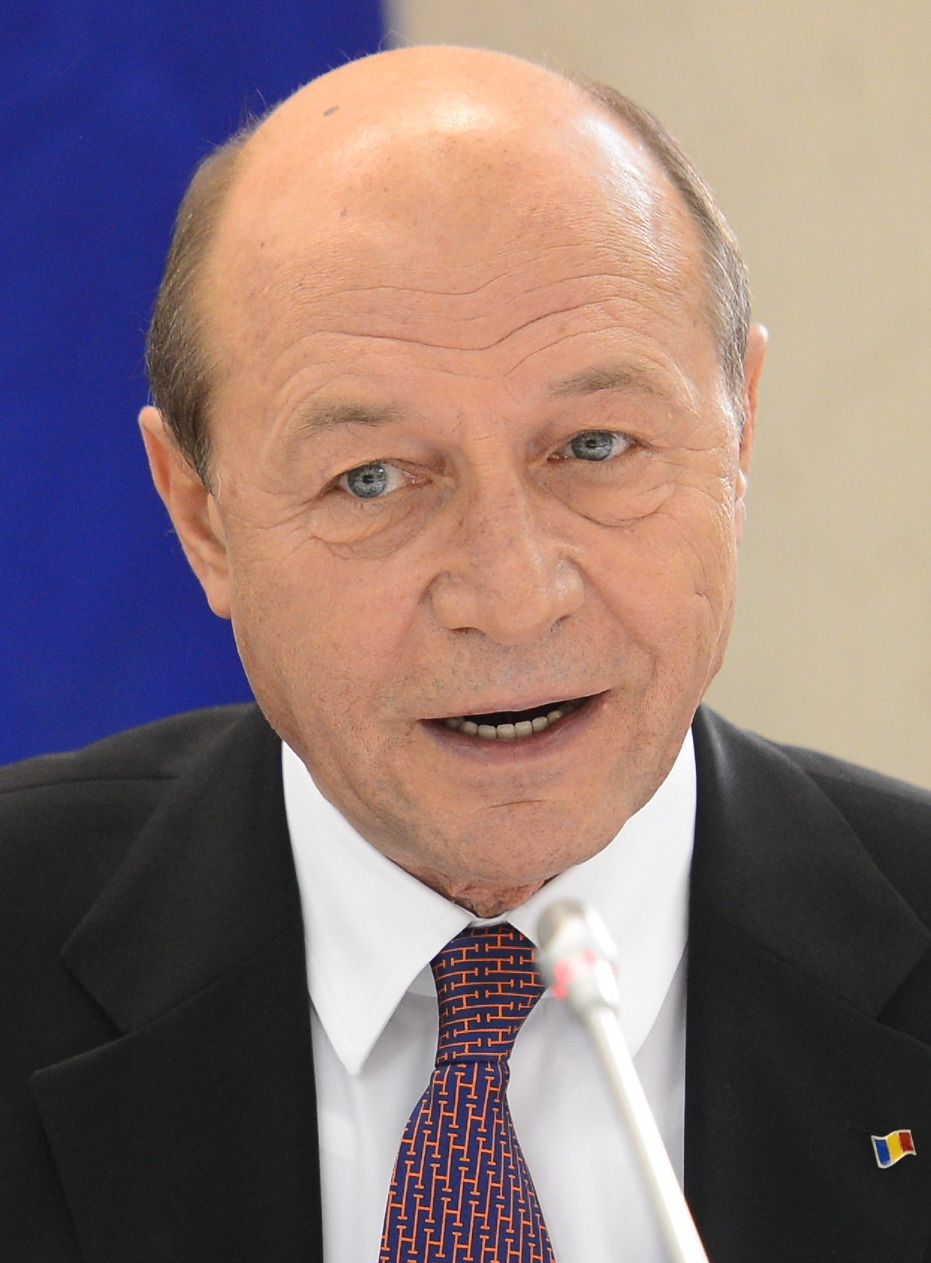

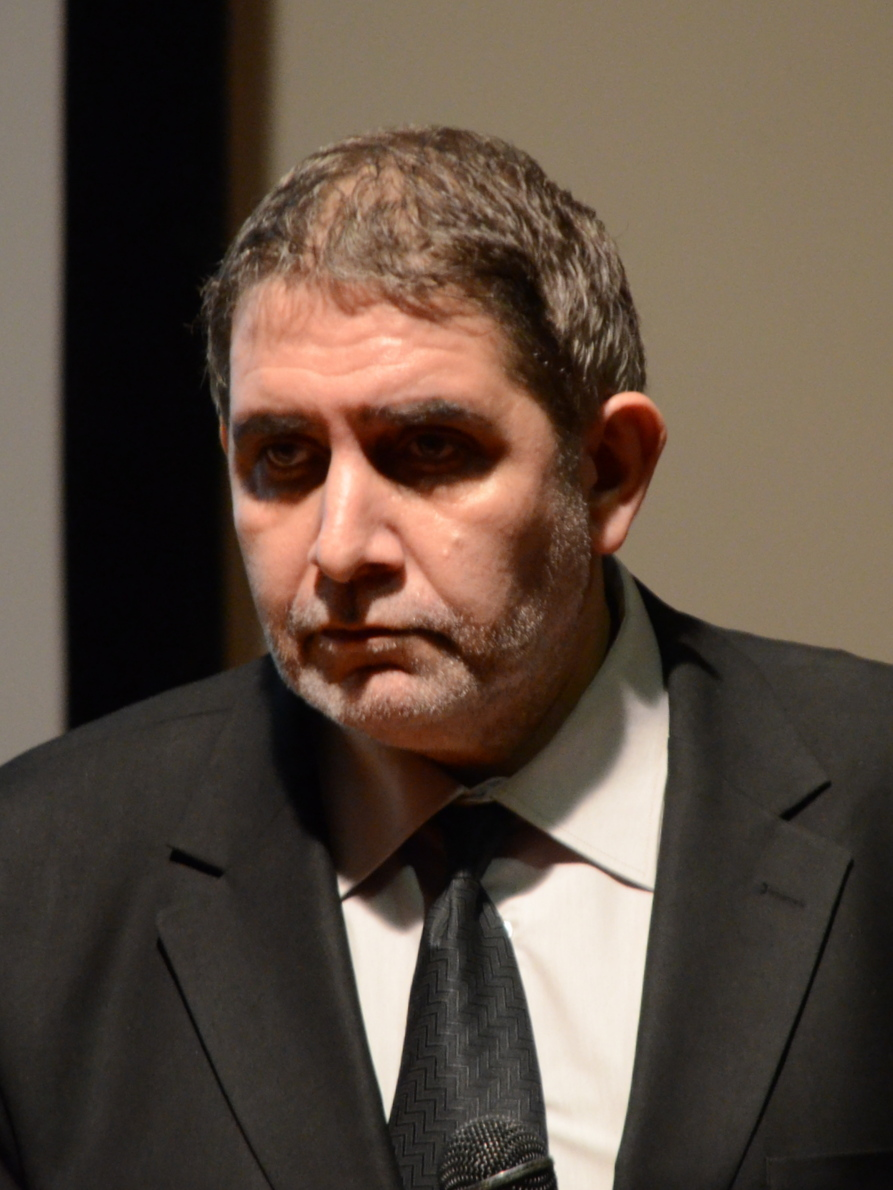
	First party	Second party	Third party
Leader	Liviu Dragnea	Alina Gorghiu	Nicușor Dan
Party	PSD	PNL	USR
Leader's seat	D - Teleorman	S - Timiș	D - Bucharest
Last election	59 S / 150 D	50 S / 100 D	-
Seats after	67 S / 154 D	30 S / 69 D	13 S / 30 D
Seat change	▲8 S / ▲4 D	▼20 S / ▼31 D	New
Popular vote	3,204,864	1,412,377	625,154
Percentage	45.48%	20.04%	8.87%
	Fourth party	Fifth party	Sixth party
Leader	Hunor Kelemen	Călin Popescu-Tăriceanu	Traian Băsescu
Party	UDMR	ALDE	PMP
Leader's seat	D - Harghita	S - Bucharest	S - Bucharest
Last election	9 S / 18 D	-	-
Seats after	9 S / 21 D	9 S / 20 D	8 S / 18 D
Seat change	0 S / ▲3 D	New	New
Popular vote	435,969	396,386	376,891
Percentage	6.19%	5.62%	5.35%
	Seventh party
Leader	Varujan Pambuccian (Note: Pambuccian, a member of the Union of Armenians of Romania, has been the parliamentary leader of the national minorities' group since 1996.)
Party	Minority parties
Leader's seat	D - Nationwide (Note: National minorities have nationwide mandates and do not represent a specific county.)
Last election	0 S / 18 D
Seats after	0 S / 17 D
Seat change	0 S / ▼1 D
Popular vote	94,028
Percentage	1.33%
Prime Minister before election
Dacian Cioloș
Independent (technocratic)
Prime Minister after election
Sorin Grindeanu
PSD

Parliamentary elections were held in Romania on 11 December 2016. They were the first held under a new electoral system adopted in 2015, which saw a return to the proportional electoral system last used in the 2004 elections. The new electoral legislation provides a norm of representation for deputies of 73,000 inhabitants and 168,000 inhabitants for senators, which decreased the number of MPs.

A total of 466 parliamentary seats (308 deputies, 18 minority deputies, and 134 senators) were contested, compared with the 588 parliamentarians elected in 2012. The diaspora was represented by four deputies and two senators, elected by postal vote. The elections saw a turnout of 39.5%, lower than in 2012 but slightly higher than in the 2008 elections.

== New electoral system ==
The parliamentary election of 2016 unfolded differently compared to 2012 and 2008. On 24 February 2015, the Electoral Code Commission decided in principle for the future electoral law to return to party-list proportional representation, thereby relinquishing the first-past-the-post (uninominal) voting system as introduced in 2008. The option of turning the Parliament of Romania into a perfectly bicameral parliament, with some 300 deputies being elected on a closed list and 100 senators being elected by a single-round uninominal majority vote, had been discussed for years and even agreed upon between the ruling Social Democratic Party (PSD) and the opposition. The new electoral law promulgated by President Klaus Iohannis on 20 July 2015 however did not retain uninominal constituencies for the Senate. Closely sticking to the commission's recommendations, the new electoral law completely returned to party-list proportional representation.

With a representation norm of one deputy per 73,000 inhabitants and one senator per 168,000 inhabitants, a total of 308 deputies were elected, to which are added the 18 deputies of minorities, 134 senators and 6 MPs of diaspora (two senators and four deputies). All in all this totals to a number of 466 MPs, five fewer than in 2008 and 122 fewer than in 2012. While for single-party lists the electoral threshold is kept at 5%, a higher threshold of 8–10% is introduced for electoral alliances. For the first time the Romanian electors residing abroad were able to cast their vote via mail, in a reaction to the flawed procedures at the 2014 presidential election.

== Parties ==
Although the image of Victor Ponta and his Social Democratic Party (PSD) was badly affected by corruption scandals and a recent wave of protests, the party remains one of the two major parties in Romania. Besides the PSD, the Romanian party system however went through a number of substantial regroupings.

=== Major regroupings ===
Leading centre-left Social Democratic Party (PSD) and the Centre Right Alliance (ACD) of the Conservative Party (PC) and National Liberal Party (PNL) contested the 2012 parliamentary election under the joint ticket of the Social Liberal Union (USL). They won an absolute majority to form a government headed by prime minister Victor Ponta.

Over time, the PC and PNL increasingly distanced themselves from each other, with the PC – despite its name – embracing social liberalism and being affected by corruption scandals involving its leader, Dan Voiculescu, who was subsequently sentenced to prison for money laundering. In turn, the PNL dropped out of the coalition government in February 2014. Formerly affiliated with the Alliance of Liberals and Democrats for Europe (ALDE), the party applied for membership in the European People's Party (EPP) and was later accepted as a member. The PNL's shift to the right led to a faction led by Călin Popescu-Tăriceanu leaving to form the Liberal Reformist Party (PLR), which then merged with the PC to found the Romanian Alliance of Liberals and Democrats (ALDE), named after the European party. This move was criticized by Conservative MEP Maria Grapini, who accused her party of betrayal.

Subsequently, the PNL joined forces with the Democratic Liberal Party (PDL), which itself had suffered a split when Traian Băsescu left to form the People's Movement (PMP). Ahead of a complete merger, the PDL and PNL formed the Christian Liberal Alliance (ACL), which successfully fielded Klaus Iohannis in the November 2014 presidential election. The two parties fully merged on 17 November 2014 under the name of National Liberal Party (PNL).

In June 2015, the left-wing National Union for the Progress of Romania (UNPR) which was previously in the Centre Left Alliance (ACS) with the Social Democrats (PSD), absorbed the remainders of dissolved populist PP-DD after the latter's founder Dan Diaconescu was convicted for extortion. UNPR president Gabriel Oprea advanced an independent list for his party for the 2016 parliamentary election. Though it aimed to win 10% of national vote on its own, the party also reaffirmed its commitment to the Centre Left Alliance (ACS) with the PSD. However, in July 2016, UNPR joined the right-leaning People's Movement Party (PMP) led by former president Traian Băsescu, despite protests from some UNPR members. Oprea, himself under investigation for abuse of power, resigned from the party and declared his intention to leave politics.

=== Further developments ===
A new nationalist party, United Romania Party (PRU), was founded by MP Bogdan Diaconu on 17 August 2014 and became official by court decision on 17 February 2015.

Also notable was the rise of the Union for the Salvation of Romania (USR), a party recently created from its base in Bucharest as the Union for the Salvation of Bucharest. Led by Nicușor Dan, a mathematics professor, it was a reformist group of newcomers to politics committed to rooting out corruption. Polling suggested that the USR would exceed its goal of winning 10% of the popular vote.

The Democratic Alliance of Hungarians in Romania (UDMR/RMDSZ), the largest party representing an ethnic minority, was also projected to be represented in the parliament.

Parties to be entered in the election and their leaders^{1}
PSD (Liviu Dragnea)	PNL (Alina Gorghiu)	ALDE (Daniel Constantin, Călin Popescu-Tăriceanu)	UDMR (Hunor Kelemen)	USR (Nicușor Dan)	PMP (Traian Băsescu)	PRU (Bogdan Diaconu)	AN (Marian Munteanu)	PER (Dănuț Pop)	PRM (Emil Străinu)	PSR (Constantin Rotaru)

== Opinion polls ==
Parties that surpass the parliamentary threshold of 5% (except the leading party)
Parties that do not surpass the parliamentary threshold of 5%
Parties that maybe can surpass or not surpass the parliamentary threshold of 5%

Poll source	Date	Sample size	PNL	PDL	PLR	PSD–UNPR–PC	PPDD	UDMR	PRM	PMP	PNȚCD	M10	PRU	Other	Lead
INSCOP	1–6 Jul 2014	1,055	19.3%	11.9%		42.3%	2.8%	5.4%	3.2%	7.5%	1.2%				13.7%
CCSCC	20–26 Aug 2014	1,248	34%		5%	38%	4%	6%	2%	7%					4%
INSCOP	30 Aug–4 Sep 2014	1,058	31.5%		4.4%	42.6%	3.4%	5.8%	3.3%	7.1%	0.8%				10.1%
INSCOP	27 Nov–2 Dec 2014	1,076	41.7%		3.3%	38.8%	2.3%	5.1%	1.2%	5.6%	0.6%				2.9%
Poll source	Date	Sample size	PNL		PLR	PSD–UNPR–PC	PPDD	UDMR	PRM	PMP	PNȚCD	M10	PRU	Other	Lead
CSOP	13–18 Dec 2014	1,044	47%			34%	2%	6%	3%	3%					13%
CSOP	27 Jan–4 Feb 2015	1,036	49%			32%	2%	6%	2%	3%					17%
INSCOP	5–10 Feb 2015	1,065	44.2%		3.3%	37.4%	1.4%	5%	1.1%	4%	0.9%				6.8%
Avangarde	18–26 Feb 2015	900	40%		5%	37%	3%	5%	4%	3%					3%
CSOP	3–10 Mar 2015	1,007	49%			31%	2%	7%	2%	2%					18%
CSCI	24–28 Mar 2015	1,073	39%		6%	37%	2%	5%		2%		3%			2%
ARP	30 Mar–3 Apr 2015	1,100	44%		3%	34%	2%	5%	2.5%	2.5%	1%				10%
CSCI	20–24 Apr 2015	1,090	42%		5%	39%	1%	4%		1%		3%			3%
Avangarde	21–29 Apr 2015	950	43%		5%	40%	1%	4%	1%	2%		2%			3%
INSCOP	23–30 Apr 2015	1,085	44.7%		2.2%	39.1%	1%	5.2%	2%	2.8%	1%				5.6%
Poll source	Date	Sample size	PNL		ALDE (PLR+PC)	PSD	UNPR (incl. PP–DD)	UDMR	PRM	MP	PNȚCD	M10	PRU	Other	Lead
INSCOP	9–14 Jul 2015	1,075	44.5%		3%	37.1%		5.1%	2.1%	2.4%	1.2%	2.3%		2.3%	7.4%
CSCI	10–17 Aug 2015	1,021	41%		3%	37%	2%	5%		3%		5%	3%	1%	4%
Avangarde	1–7 Sep 2015	1,000 (Note: Bucharest only.)	32%		6%	34%	7%		2%	4%	2%	5%		8%	2%
INSCOP	10–15 Sep 2015	1,085	42%		2.6%	35%	5.1%	5%	1.3%	2.5%	1%	2%	1%	2.5%	7%
INSCOP	26 Nov–2 Dec 2015	1,071	40.1%		4%	36.3%	2.6%	5.2%	1.1%	4.4%	1%	2.4%		2.9%	3.8%
ARP	2–6 Dec 2015	950	35%		6.5%	34%	2.5%	4%	5%	7.5%	2.5%	1.5%		1.5%	1%
CIADO	1–5 Feb 2016	1,157	35.45%		4.57%	36.42%								23.56%	0.97%
INSCOP	21–28 Mar 2016	1,068	37.2%		5.3%	39.2%		5%	1%	5.1%	0.4%	2.2%	1.2%	3.4%	2%
Poll source	Date	Sample size	PNL		ALDE	PSD	PMP (incl. UNPR)		UDMR		USR		PRU	Other	Lead
CIADO	1–10 Aug 2016	5,428 (urban only)	32.33%		8.2%	35.76%	7.57%		5.1%		8.1%		-	2.94%	3.43%
TNS	14–23 Sep 2016	1,000	25%		7%	45%	4%		5%		10%		3%	1%	20%
ARP	17–24 Sep 2016	1,170	30%		5.5%	38%	4%		5%		9%		-	8.5%	8%
CIADO	6–30 Oct 2016	4,500	29.3%		6.5%	44.6%	4.9%		5.2%		5.7%		2.5%	1.3%	15.3%
CCSB	1-7 Nov 2016	1,261	27.2%		5.2%	40.2%	5%		5.4%		11%		4.2%	1.8%	13%
TNS	11-21 Nov 2016	1,003	18%		7%	40%	7%		3%		19%		3%	3%	21%
Avangarde	20-27 Nov 2016	1000	27%		6%	43%	5%		5%		8%		3%	3%	16%
SOCIOPOL	23-30 Nov 2016	1006	25%		6%	40%	5%		5%		10%		5%	4%	15%
SOCIOPOL	3-7 Dec 2016	1002	27%		6%	41%	4%		4%		7%		5%	6%	14%
IRES	6-7 Dec 2016	1100	23%		6%	44%	6%		5%		7%		4%	5%	21%
Avangarde	Synthesis	Unspecified	24–31%		5–6%	40%	5–7%		-		7–15%		3–5%	-	9–16%

=== Graphical summary of the polls ===
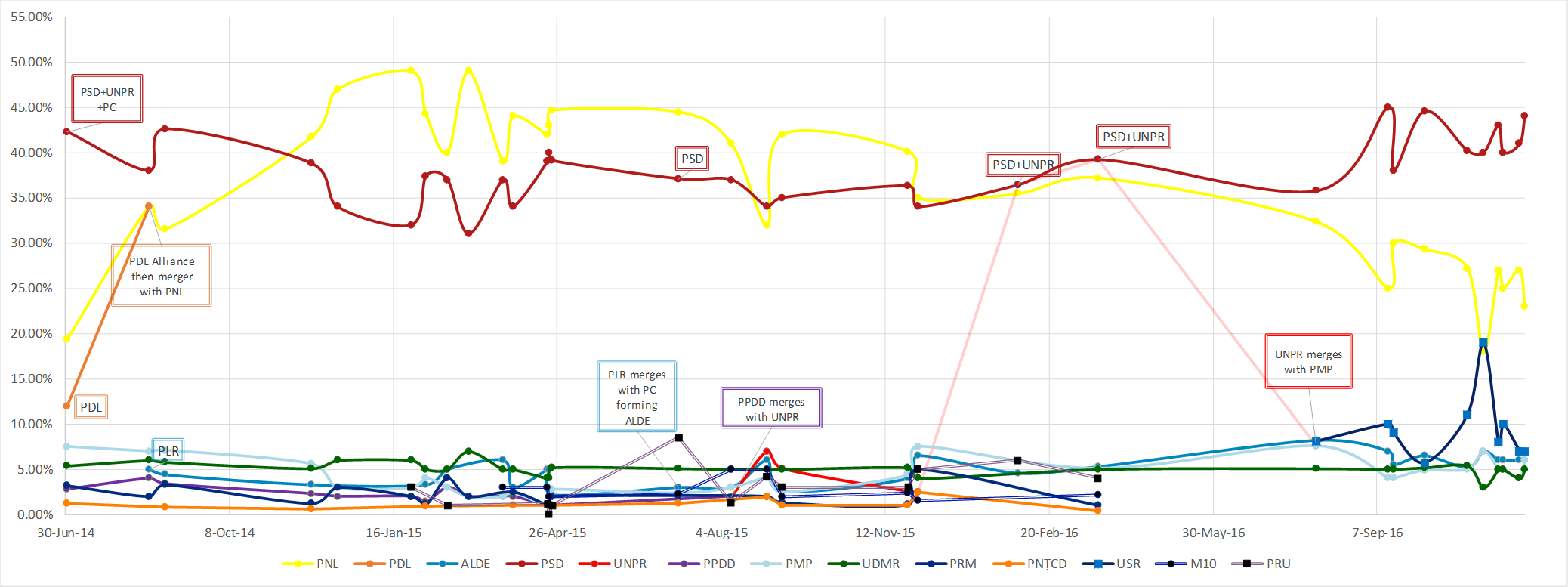
Graphical representation of the polling for the 2016 Romanian parliamentary election

== Results ==
Results of the election, showing vote strength by electoral district. Top: results for the Chamber of Deputies; bottom: results for the Senate.

Results of the election by electoral district. Top: results for the Chamber of Deputies; bottom: results for the Senate

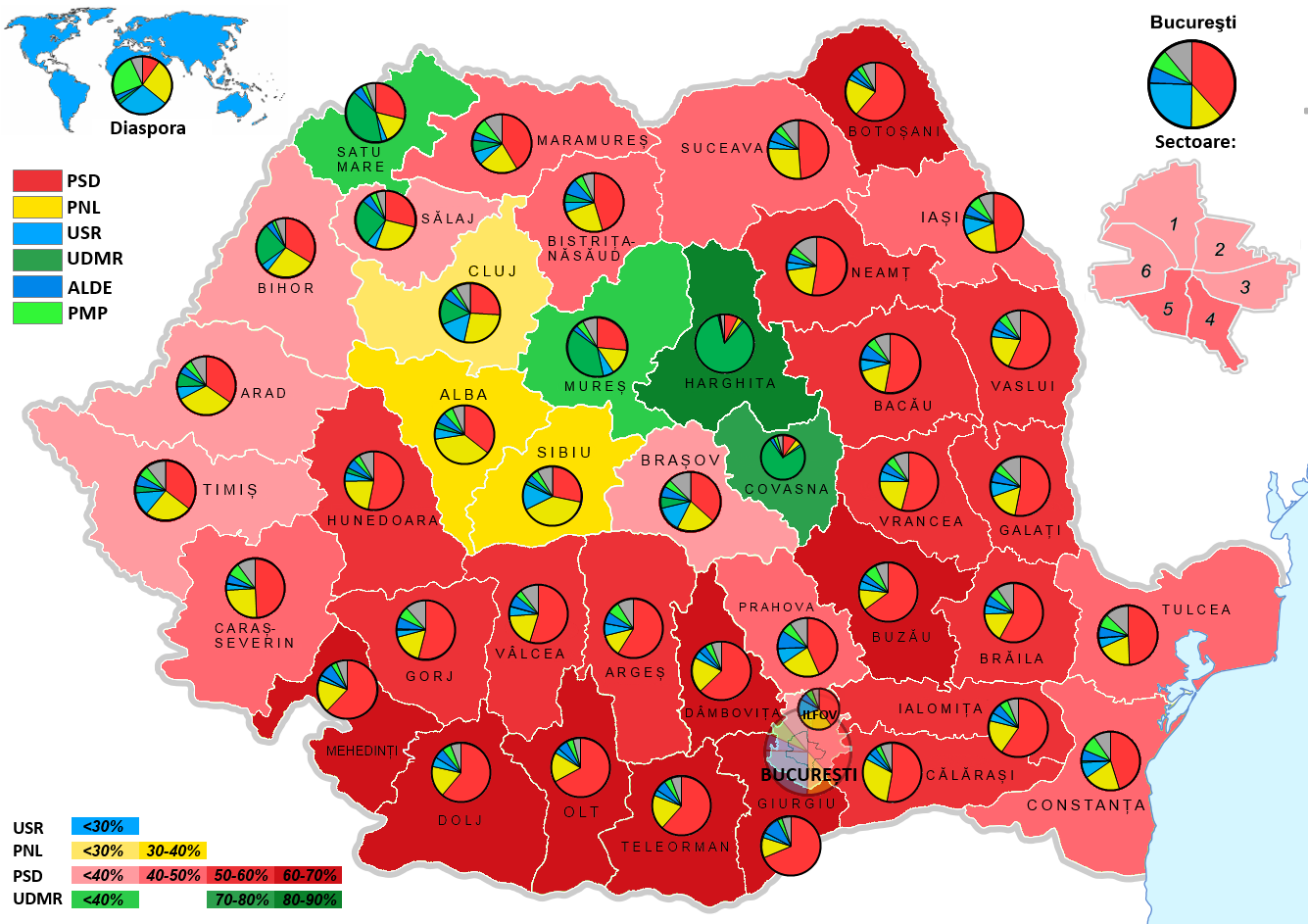
Vote share by party and county

=== Chamber of Deputies ===
Party	Votes	%	Seats	+/–
Social Democratic Party	3,204,864	45.48	154	+4
National Liberal Party	1,412,377	20.04	69	–31
Save Romania Union	625,154	8.87	30	New
Democratic Alliance of Hungarians in Romania	435,969	6.19	21	+3
Alliance of Liberals and Democrats	396,386	5.62	20	New
People's Movement Party	376,891	5.35	18	New
United Romania Party	196,397	2.79	0	New
Greater Romania Party	73,264	1.04	0	0
Ecologist Party of Romania	62,414	0.89	0	0
Our Romania Alliance	61,206	0.87	0	New
Romanian Socialist Party	24,580	0.35	0	0
Party of the Roma	13,126	0.19	1	0
Democratic Forum of Germans	12,375	0.18	1	0
Democratic Union of Slovaks and Czechs of Romania	6,545	0.09	1	0
Community of the Lipovan Russians	6,160	0.09	1	0
Hellenic Union of Romania	5,817	0.08	1	0
Democratic Turkish Union of Romania	5,536	0.08	1	0
Association of Macedonians of Romania	5,513	0.08	1	0
Union of Serbs of Romania	5,468	0.08	1	0
Federation of the Jewish Communities in Romania	5,069	0.07	1	0
Union of Armenians of Romania	4,868	0.07	1	0
League of Albanians of Romania	4,640	0.07	1	0
Bulgarian Union of Banat–Romania	4,542	0.06	1	0
Union of Croats of Romania	3,532	0.05	1	0
Association of Italians of Romania	3,486	0.05	1	0
Union of Poles of Romania	3,355	0.05	1	0
Cultural Union of Ruthenians of Romania	2,824	0.04	1	0
Humanist Power Party	2,599	0.04	0	New
New Romania Party	1,764	0.03	0	New
Union of the Ukrainians of Romania	1,172	0.02	1	0
Youth Civic Action Platform	609	0.01	0	New
Green Party	566	0.01	0	New
Democratic Roma Party	523	0.01	0	New
National Unity Bloc	518	0.01	0	New
Our Vrancea Party	511	0.01	0	New
Independents	76,764	1.09	0	0
Total	7,047,384	100.00	329	–83
Valid votes	7,047,384	97.05		
Invalid/blank votes	213,916	2.95		
Total votes	7,261,300	100.00		
Registered voters/turnout	18,403,044	39.46		
Source: BEC

=== Senate ===
Party	Votes	%	Seats	+/–
Social Democratic Party	3,221,786	45.68	67	+8
National Liberal Party	1,440,193	20.42	30	–20
Save Romania Union	629,375	8.92	13	New
Democratic Alliance of Hungarians in Romania	440,409	6.24	9	0
Alliance of Liberals and Democrats	423,728	6.01	9	New
People's Movement Party	398,791	5.65	8	New
United Romania Party	207,977	2.95	0	New
Greater Romania Party	83,568	1.18	0	0
Ecologist Party of Romania	77,218	1.09	0	0
Our Romania Alliance	66,774	0.95	0	New
Romanian Socialist Party	32,808	0.47	0	0
Humanist Power Party	3,066	0.04	0	New
New Romania Party	2,349	0.03	0	New
National Unity Bloc	739	0.01	0	New
Green Party	719	0.01	0	New
Youth Civic Action Platform	719	0.01	0	New
Our Vrancea Party	652	0.01	0	New
Democratic Roma Party	648	0.01	0	New
Republican Party of Romania	52	0.00	0	New
Independents	21,395	0.30	0	0
Total	7,052,966	100.00	136	–40
Valid votes	7,052,966	97.16		
Invalid/blank votes	205,973	2.84		
Total votes	7,258,939	100.00		
Registered voters/turnout	18,403,044	39.44		
Source: BEC

== See also ==
- List of members of the Senate of Romania (2016–2020)
- List of members of the Chamber of Deputies of Romania (2016–2020)
