= National Action League Party =

National Action League Party Partidul Liga Acțiunii Naționale
- Abbreviation: PLAN
- President: Silviu Predoiu
- Secretary: Lucian Daraban
- Founder: Silviu Predoiu; Alexandru Gabriel Feroiu
- Founded: 2022
- Headquarters: Bucharest
- Ideology: Social liberalism
- Political position: Centre

Website
- planromania.ro

The National Action League Party (Romanian: Partidul Liga Acțiunii Naționale, PLAN), or simply National Action League (Romanian: Liga Acțiunii Naționale), is a political party in Romania. The party was founded in 2022 by general Silviu Predoiu in opposition to the ruling National Coalition for Romania. The party describes itself as centrist, following a social liberal ideology.

Party founder and president Silviu Predoiu was the party's candidate for the annulled 2024 presidential election, receiving the fewest votes, and ran again in the 2025 presidential election, also receiving the fewest votes.

== See also ==
- PRO Romania
- National Union for the Progress of Romania
- Social Liberal Humanist Party
- Liberalism and radicalism in Romania
- Netherlands with a PLAN
