= Cultural Union of Ruthenians of Romania =

Cultural Union of Ruthenians of Romania Uniunea Culturală a Rutenilor din România Културне Товариство Русинів Романії
- Founded: 2000
- Newspaper: Jurnal Rutean
- Ideology: Rusyn minority politics
- National affiliation: National Minorities Parliamentary Group
- Chamber of Deputies: 1 / 329
- Senate: 0 / 136
- European Parliament: 0 / 32

Website
- rutenii.ro

The Cultural Union of Ruthenians of Romania (Romanian: Uniunea Culturală a Rutenilor din România, UCRR; Rusyn: Културне Товариство Русинів Романії, romanized: Kulturne Tovarystvo Rusyniv Romaniji, KTRR) is an ethnic minority political party in Romania representing the Rusyn community.

== History ==
The AIR was established in 2000. It contested the 2000 general elections, and despite receiving just 6,942 votes (0.06%), it won a seat in the Chamber of Deputies under the electoral law allowing political parties representing ethnic minority groups to be exempt from the electoral threshold as long as they received 10% of the vote required for a single seat in the Chamber of Deputies.

The party has won a seat in every election since.

== Election results ==
Election	Chamber of Deputies			Senate		
Election	Votes	%	Seats	Votes	%	Seats
2000	6,942	0.06	1	–	–	–
2004	2,871	0.03	1			
2008	4,514	0.07	1	–	–	–
2012	5,265	0.07	1	–	–	–
2016	2,824	0.04	1	–	–	–
2020	3,779	0.06	1	–	–	–
