= Platform for Democracy, Prosperity, and Progress =

Platform for Democracy, Prosperity, and Progress Platforma pentru Democrație, Prosperitate și Progres
- Founded: 24 September 2024
- Membership: REPER; Demos; ACUM; Volt; Independents
- Ideology: Progressivism; Pro-Europeanism; Anti-corruption
- Political position: Big tent (Centre to left-wing)

The Platform for Democracy, Prosperity, and Progress (Romanian: Platforma pentru Democrație, Prosperitate și Progres) is an electoral alliance of four political parties (REPER, Demos, ACUM, and Volt) formed to contest the 2024 Romanian parliamentary election.

Originally a three party alliance, Volt Romania joined soon after the coalition's founding. All four parties will run on REPER's electoral lists to circumvent the raised electoral threshold for coalitions.

The parties have widely differing views on economic issues, with REPER supporting economic liberalism while Demos is a democratic socialist party. However, all four parties share progressive views on social issues and support further European integration.

== Composition ==
Party	Abbr.	Ideology
Renewing Romania's European Project	REPER	Liberalism
Democracy and Solidarity Party	Demos	Democratic socialism
NOW Party	ACUM	Green politics
Volt Romania	Volt	Social liberalism

== See also ==
- Health Education Nature Sustainability Party
- Justice and Respect in Europe for All Party
