= Union of Croats of Romania =

Union of Croats of Romania Uniunea Croaților din România Zajedništvo Hrvata u Rumunjskoj
- President: Giureci-Slobodan Ghera
- Founded: 1991
- Ideology: Croatian minority interests
- National affiliation: National Minorities Parliamentary Group
- Chamber of Deputies: 1 / 330
- Senate: 0 / 136
- European Parliament: 0 / 32

Website
- www.zhr-ucr.ro

The Union of Croats of Romania (Romanian: Uniunea Croaților din România, UCR; Croatian: Zajedništvo Hrvata u Rumunjskoj, ZHR) is an ethnic minority political party in Romania representing the Croatian community. Its headquarters are in Carașova.

== History ==
The UCR contested the 1992 general elections, but received just 219 votes and failed to win a seat; the electoral law allowing political parties representing ethnic minority groups to be exempt from the electoral threshold only applied as long as they received 10% of the vote required for a single seat in the Chamber of Deputies. It again failed to win a seat in the 1996 elections as it received just 486 votes, but the 2000 elections saw the party receive 11,084 votes, winning a seat for the first time. It has won a seat in every election since.

== Electoral history ==
Election	Chamber of Deputies			Senate		
Election	Votes	%	Seats	Votes	%	Seats
1992	219	0.00	0	–	–	–
1996	486	0.00	0	–	–	–
2000	11,084	0.10	1	–	–	–
2004	10,331	0.10	1	–	–	–
2008	9,047	0.13	1	–	–	–
2012	6,281	0.08	1	–	–	–
2016	3,532	0.05	1	–	–	–
2020	3,345	0.06	1	–	–	–
