= Community of the Lipovan Russians in Romania =

Political party in Romania

Community of the Lipovan Russians in Romania Comunitatea Rușilor Lipoveni din România Община русских-липован Румынии
- President: Silviu Feodor (since 2016)
- Founded: 14 January 1990
- Headquarters: Str. Dr. Rațiu, nr.10, Sector 1, Bucharest
- Newspaper: Zorile
- Ideology: Lipovan Russian minority interests
- Religion: Old Believers
- National affiliation: National Minorities Parliamentary Group
- Chamber of Deputies: 1 / 329
- Senate: 0 / 136
- European Parliament: 0 / 32

Party flag
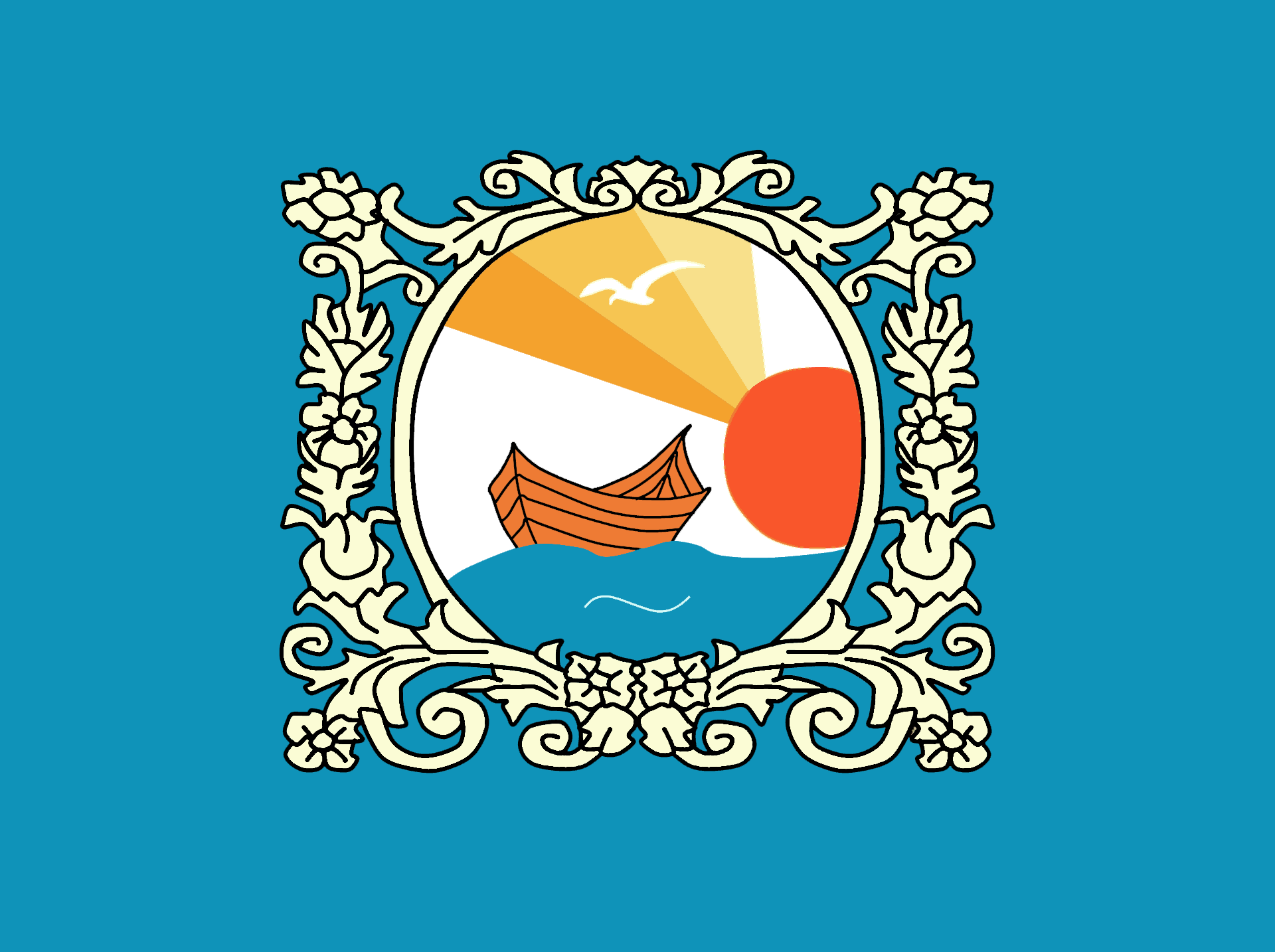

Website
- www.crlr.ro

The Community of the Lipovan Russians in Romania (Romanian: Comunitatea Rușilor Lipoveni din România, CRL; Russian: Община русских-липован Румынии, romanized: Obshchina Russkikh-Lipovan Rumynii, ORL) is an ethnic minority political party in Romania representing the Lipovan community.

== History ==
Established on 14 January 1990, the CRLR took part in the May 1990 general elections. Despite receiving only 0.13% of the vote, it received one seat in the Chamber of Deputies under the electoral law that allows for political parties representing ethnic minority groups to be exempt from the electoral threshold. It has been receiving a seat in every election since.

== Election results ==
Election	Chamber of Deputies			Senate		
Election	Votes	%	Seats	Votes	%	Seats
1990	17,974	0.13	1	–	–	–
1992	14,975	0.14	1			
1996	11,902	0.10	1	–	–	–
2000	11,558	0.10	1	–	–	–
2004	10,562	0.10	1			
2008	9,203	0.13	1	–	–	–
2012	8,328	0.11	1	–	–	–
2016	6,160	0.09	1	–	–	–
2020	5,146	0.09	1	–	–	–

== Notable members ==
- Miron Ignat, member of parliament 2000–2018
- Andrian Ampleev, member of parliament 2018–2020, taking Ignat's seat after his death
- Silviu Feodor, party president since 2016 and member of parliament since 2020
