= Bulgarian Union of Banat–Romania =

Bulgarian Union of Banat–Romania Uniunea Bulgară din Banat–România Български съюз на Банат–Румъния
- Founded: 3 May 1990
- Headquarters: Strada Palanca, Nr. 1, Timișoara
- Ideology: Banat Bulgarian minority interests
- National affiliation: National Minorities Parliamentary Group
- Chamber of Deputies: 1 / 329
- Senate: 0 / 136
- European Parliament: 0 / 32

The Bulgarian Union of Banat–Romania (Romanian: Uniunea Bulgară din Banat–România, UBB-R; Bulgarian: Български съюз на Банат–Румъния, romanized: Bălgarski săyuz na Banat–Rumăniya, BSB-R) is an ethnic minority political party in Romania representing the Bulgarian community.

== History ==
The UBB-R contested the 1990 general elections, and despite receiving only 3,451 votes (0.03%), it won a single seat in the Chamber of Deputies under the electoral law that allows for political parties representing ethnic minority groups to be exempt from the electoral threshold. It retained its seat in the 1992 elections, but was beaten by the Bratstvo Community of Bulgarians in Romania in the 1996 elections, losing its seat.

The party regained its seat in the 2000 elections, and has retained it in every election since, including in the 2020 elections, when it received 0.08% of the vote.

== Election results ==
Election	Chamber of Deputies			Senate		
Election	Votes	%	Seats	Votes	%	Seats
1990	3,451	0.03	1	–	–	–
1992	1,906	0.02	1			
1996	4,115	0.03	0	–	–	–
2000	20,085	0.18	1	–	–	–
2004	15,283	0.15	1			
2008	14,039	0.20	1	–	–	–
2012	10,155	0.14	1	–	–	–
2016	4,542	0.06	1	–	–	–
2020	4,853	0.08	1	–	–	–
