= Romanian ethnic minority parties =

Parliamentary Group of National Minorities Grupul parlamentar al minorităților naționale
- Abbreviation: GPMN
- Leader: Varujan Pambuccian (UAR)
- Vice Leader: Giureci-Slobodan Ghera (UCR)
- Secretary: Ognean Crîstici (USR)
- Founded: 18 June 1990
- Ideology: National minority interests Factions; Christian democracy (DFDR/FDGR and UDSCR); Conservative liberalism (DFDR/FDGR); Social democracy (PRPE)
- Political position: Big tent Factions; Centre-right (DFDR/FDGR and UDSCR); Centre-left (PRPE)
- Chamber of Deputies: 19 / 331

Website
- Group page on the Chamber of Deputies website

The Romanian Constitution (Article 62) provides seats in the Chamber of Deputies for representatives of ethnic minorities in Romania (with the limitation that each national minority is to be represented by one organization only). Minority organizations are exempt from the electoral threshold, and are guaranteed a seat so long as they earn at least 10% of the vote that was required for the last party eligible to earn a seat through the threshold.

The representatives elected in this manner sit in the Parliamentary Group of National Minorities (Romanian: Grupul parlamentar al minorităților naționale) in the Chamber of Deputies; the Group traditionally give confidence and supply to the government. The number of seats awarded to ethnic minorities varied from 10 in 1990 to 19 since 2024 onwards.

== List of parties ==
The following are members of the National Minority Parliamentary Group which hold or formerly held a seat in the Chamber of Deputies. Beyond the groups sitting in Parliament based on the minority party exemption, the Democratic Alliance of Hungarians in Romania (Romanian: Uniunea Democrată Maghiară din România, Hungarian: Romániai Magyar Demokrata Szövetség, RMDSZ) is a centre-right party representing the much larger Hungarian community. It has been represented in both the Chamber of Deputies and Senate continuously since 1990 competing as an ordinary party.

Previously, a number of political parties represented Romania's ethnic minorities—particularly Hungarians, Germans, and Jews—until the suppression of all political parties other than the ruling National Renaissance Front in 1938. Some minority organizations allied to the Romanian Communist Party, such as the Hungarian People's Union and Jewish Democratic Committee, survived until their suppression in 1953.

=== Active ===
- Association of Italians of Romania (held 1 seat since 2004 election)
- Association of Macedonians of Romania
- Bulgarian Union of Banat–Romania (held 1 seat since 1990 election)
- Community of the Lipovan Russians in Romania (held 1 seat since 1990 election)
- Cultural Union of Ruthenians of Romania
- Democratic Forum of Germans in Romania (held 1 seat since 1990 election)
- Democratic Turkish Union of Romania (held 1 seat since 1990 election)
- Democratic Union of Slovaks and Czechs of Romania
- Democratic Union of Turkic-Muslim Tatars of Romania
- Federation of the Jewish Communities in Romania (held 1 seat since 1996 election)
- Forum of Czechs in Romania
- Hellenic Union of Romania (held 1 seat since 1990 election)
- League of Albanians of Romania
- Party of the Roma (held 1 seat since 1992 election)
- Union of Armenians of Romania
- Union of Croats of Romania
- Union of Poles of Romania (held 1 seat since 1990 election)
- Union of Serbs of Romania (held 1 seat since 1990 election)
- Union of the Ukrainians of Romania

=== Defunct ===
- Bratstvo Community of Bulgarians in Romania (1996–2000)
- Cultural Union of Albanians of Romania (1996–2000)

== Gallery ==
Former logo (1990–2024)

== See also ==
- Reserved political positions
