= Hellenic Union of Romania =

Hellenic Union of Romania Uniunea Elenă din România Ένωση Ελλήνων της Ρουμανίας
- President: Dragoş Gabriel Zisopol
- Founded: 28 December 1989
- Registered: 26 February 1990
- Headquarters: Str. Vasile Alecsandri, nr. 8, Sector 1, Bucharest
- Ideology: Greek minority politics
- National affiliation: National Minorities Parliamentary Group
- Chamber of Deputies: 1 / 330
- Senate: 0 / 136
- European Parliament: 0 / 32

Website
- uniunea-elena.ro

The Hellenic Union of Romania (Romanian: Uniunea Elenă din România, UER; Greek: Ένωση Ελλήνων της Ρουμανίας, romanized: Énōsē Ellḗnōn tēs Roumanías, EER) is an ethnic minority political party in Romania representing the Greek community.

== History ==
The UER contested the 1990 general elections, and despite receiving only 0.04% of the vote, it won a single seat in the Chamber of Deputies under the electoral law that allows for political parties representing ethnic minority groups to be exempt from the electoral threshold. It has won a seat in every election since, including in the 2020 general elections, when it received 0.1% of the vote.

== Electoral history ==
Election	Chamber of Deputies			Senate		
Election	Votes	%	Seats	Votes	%	Seats
1990	4,932	0.04	1	–	–	–
1992	9,134	0.08	1			
1996	8,463	0.07	1	–	–	–
2000	15,007	0.13	1	–	–	–
2004	7,161	0.07	1			
2008	8,875	0.12	1	–	–	–
2012	9,863	0.13	1	–	–	–
2016	5,817	0.08	1	–	–	–
2020	6,096	0.1	1	–	–	–
2024	7,565	0.08	1	–	–	–
