= Democratic Union of Slovaks and Czechs of Romania =

Democratic Union of Slovaks and Czechs of Romania Uniunea Democratică a Slovacilor și Cehilor din România Demokratický svaz Slováků a Čechů v Rumunsku Demokratický zväz Slovákov a Čechov v Rumunsku
- Logo of the Democratic Union of Slovaks and Czechs of Romania
- Abbreviation: UDSCR
- Leader: Adrian-Miroslav Merka
- Founded: 4 January 1990
- Headquarters: Strada Independenței 36, Nădlac
- Ideology: Slovak minority politics Czech minority politics Christian democracy
- Political position: Centre-right
- National affiliation: National Minorities Parliamentary Group
- European affiliation: European Christian Political Party
- Colors: Blue
- Chamber of Deputies: 1 / 330
- Senate: 0 / 136
- European Parliament: 0 / 33

Website
- udscr.com.ro

The Democratic Union of Slovaks and Czechs of Romania (Romanian: Uniunea Democratică a Slovacilor și Cehilor din România, UDSCR; Czech: Demokratický svaz Slováků a Čechů v Rumunsku, DSSCR; Slovak: Demokratický zväz Slovákov a Čechov v Rumunsku, DZSCR) is an ethnic minority political party in Romania representing the Czech and Slovak communities.

== History ==
Established on 4 January 1990 in Nădlac, the UDSCR contested the May 1990 general elections. Despite receiving only 4,584 votes (0.03%), it won a single seat in the Chamber of Deputies under the electoral law that allows for political parties representing ethnic minority groups to be exempt from the electoral threshold. It has won a seat in every election since.

== Electoral history ==
Election	Chamber of Deputies			Senate		
Election	Votes	%	Seats	Votes	%	Seats
1990	4,584	0.03	1	–	–	–
1992	4,708	0.04	1			
1996	6,531	0.05	1	–	–	–
2000	5,686	0.05	1	–	–	–
2004	5,950	0.06	1	–	–	–
2008	15,373	0.22	1	–	–	–
2012	8,677	0.12	1	–	–	–
2016	6,545	0.09	1	–	–	–
2020	5,386	0.09	1	–	–	–
