= Party of Free Change =

Party of Free Change Partidul Liber-Schimbist
- Abbreviation: PLS
- President: Ștefan Cazimir (1990–1992); Mircea Cornișteanu (1992–1996)
- Secretary: Gheorghe Boșman
- Founder: Octavian Andronic
- Founded: February 6, 1990
- Dissolved: 1996
- Headquarters: Strada Transilvaniei 12, Sector 1, Bucharest
- Newspaper: Răcnetul Carpaților
- Ideology: Satire; Caragialism; Extremism (official)
- Anthem: Mărire vouă, lupte seculare

The Party of Free Change (Romanian: Partidul Liber-Schimbist, PLS) was a satirical political party in Romania, founded by Octavian Andronic and with Ștefan Cazimir as its first president. Its name, message and symbols were overt references and homages to Ion Luca Caragiale, the classical Romanian humorist; building on an inside joke, its agenda praised opportunism and even encouraged members to leave the party. However, the PLS was also criticized for its alleged links with the ruling National Salvation Front (FSN), and for being one of the many groups which split the vote in the general election of 1990 and local ones of 1992. It won a seat in Chamber, taken by Cazimir, and several positions on local councils; it was also considered for the government coalition built by Theodor Stolojan in late 1991.

While criticized in many contexts for allegedly serving as the FSN's vehicle, the PLS had appeal as an elaborate joke among disgruntled intellectuals. At various times, its rank-and-file included comedian Dem Rădulescu, scholar Alexandru Călinescu, and singer-songwriter Doru Stănculescu, as well as scores of others of literary and artistic professionals. Changes in the electoral legislation signaled its decline—a rapid one, after Cazimir had endorsed Ion Iliescu and the Democratic Front of National Salvation ahead of general elections in 1992. Other party activists declared him a defector, and continued to organize separately, but failed to win any seats. Cazimir continued his political career with Iliescu's Social Democratic Party. Although technically undissolvable according to its statutes, the PLS eventually disappeared before the 1996 election. Theater director Mircea Cornișteanu was its second and last president.

== History ==
=== Creation ===
The PLS began existence shortly after the December 1989 revolution, which toppled the communist regime and restored multiparty democracy. It was founded by editorial cartoonist Octavian Andronic, with a manifesto published on February 6, 1990 in Libertatea daily; literary critic Ștefan Cazimir adhered "by phone" on February 7. The name was adapted from Ion Luca Caragiale's comedy O scrisoare pierdută (1884), which Andronic had just watched on Romanian Television, in the Liviu Ciulei adaptation. In the original text, it already appears as a malapropism and double entendre: one of the key characters, Nae Cațavencu, declares himself liber schimbist, technically "a supporter of free trade", but this can also be read as "easy changer"—one who changes views or convictions easily, without scruples. One of the main principles of the party was granting the status of honorary membership to anyone who changed their allegiance from one political party to another.

Cazimir, often mistaken as the party founder, had had a political involvement with the Romanian Communist Party and, earlier, the Union of Communist Youth, to which he adhered c. 1949. In December, he had been caught up in the revolutionary events, first as an unwilling participant in the communist counter-manifestation, then as a supporter of the street movement in Bucharest. Overall, the new enterprise was entirely built on his deadpan humor (for which he was already famous) and his deep familiarity with Caragiale's work—he was recognized as a Caragiale expert since the 1960s. During January, Cazimir pondered entering politics as an independent, promising his constituents to "read out from Caragiale as often as possible". Another founding member, Mircea Cornișteanu, produced and directed Caragiale plays, and is described as one of Caragiale's "feverish admirers". Looking part on the first post-revolutionary years in 2010, philologist Mona Momescu argues that the abundance of references to Caragiale—present with both the PLS as a "literary party" and the unrelated humor magazine, Academia Cațavencu—showed that Romanians had not yet abandoned the practice of "cultural resistance", which had been favored by communist-era dissidents.

Due to its literary pedigree leading back to the 1880s, the PLS called itself an "historic party". A portrait of Caragiale appeared on its first-ever logo, later changed to "the drawing of a child biting on a flower" (also noted as a "five-leaf clover"). Tributes for the writer extended into other areas of party activity—including the PLS motto, Caragiale e cu noi! ("Caragiale is with us!"). The party hymn, called Mărire vouă, lupte seculare ("Glory to Thee, Combats of Centuries"), ended with another paraphrase from O scrisoare...: Trădare fie, dar s-o știm și noi! ("Let's have betrayal, but let's be aware of it!"). Its official tribune, founded by Andronic and called Răcnetul Carpaților ("The Roar of the Carpathians", after Cațavencu's fictional gazette), ran fragments from Caragiale's political satire as genuine political news and commentary. Reviving Cațavencu's rhetoric, perceived enemies of the party where addressed as reprobabili ("detestable people"), and allies as venerabili or stimabili ("venerable" or "esteemed people").

The group's early recruits included singer-songwriter Doru Stănculescu, though he quit politics shortly after and started a new life in France. The PLS soon had embryonic local chapters, or "initiative committees"—economist Eugen Bâlc presided over one such unit in Sălaj County. The national organizing conference took place on February 18 at the People's Art College, on Cosmonauților Street, Bucharest. It was here that Cazimir was made president, with Andronic's blessing—the latter, being chief editor of the independent Libertatea, did not wish to become politically involved. Under Cazimir, the party would not declare its ideology, but parodied serious parties for their quick adoption of "centrism". In this context, it announced itself as being a party "on the outer edge", because "two cannot be at the center without stifling or crushing each other. Plus, one can get a better perspective from the edge". The PSL's self-depiction as an extremist party was immediately contradicted by the statutes, which criticized other political forces for dealing in "annoyance, tension, and violence", proposing that dialogue needed to be fostered between all political forces. Cazimir noted that the party platform only ever stood out from that of serious groups "in being grammatically correct". While "most other groups cultivate unwitting humor", PLS statutes endorsed "witting humor". This also meant that the PLS "is militating for a reduction of Caragiale's applicability to the present day. This applicability is however endorsed by the other political forces."

=== 1990 performance and controversy ===
Soon after its official registration on March 1, the PLS was invited by the governing National Salvation Front (FSN) to join Romania's temporary legislature, or Provisional National Unity Council (CPUN). Its one seat there was taken by Cazimir. For a while, the PLS was attractive to intellectuals who had come to resent the FSN, such as the literary historian Alexandru Călinescu (who joined the party because he intended to highlight the "comedy" of Romanian politics) and theatrical director Bogdan Ulmu. Cazimir himself was critical of the FSN and its leader Ion Iliescu, establishing contacts with the Golaniad protest movement (named after golani, "hoodlums", the word used by Iliescu to describe his opponents). As he noted in an April 1990 interview with academic George Pruteanu, he considered himself a "veteran hoodlum" (golan veteran), and suggested that the anti-FSN movement was "too numerous not to be taken into account" (Cazimir's emphasis); according to Pruteanu's marginal comments, part of this statement may have been sarcastic. Also then, Cazimir stated that he was not opposed to the Proclamation of Timișoara, which had asked for the lustration of high-ranking communists, and which the FSN was explicitly against. As he put it, the PLS statues contained a similar provision, barring "people who have held high-ranking central- or local-level positions between January 1, 1980 and December 22, 1989" from applying as members; the same provisions forbade people "compromised by their active support for the former regime", as well as those "lacking in sense of humor" from joining the PLS.

With Cazimir as president, seconded by Gheorghe Boșman, the party held its first congress at Cervantes High School, Bucharest, shortly before the May 1990 general elections. The PLS benefited from the liberal electoral law of that period, which required registrations to have only 251 signatures. Politician and scholar Cristian Preda places the PLS in a category of ephemeral groups created in that interval, alongside a Romanian Democratic Popular Realist Revolutionary Party and a Party of Heroes Killed for the Freedom of Living Heroes Maimed by the Barbarian Bullets. Unlike these highly localized projects, the PLS ran candidates in 26 precincts, and formed small but active county organizations—according to Cazimir, these were mostly run by divorcée ladies. The party had recruited a celebrated comedian, Dem Rădulescu, though he defected to the "Party of Democratic Unity" just days before the election, and was registered on its Senate list at Vîlcea.

The PLS received around 0.3% of the vote in both the Senate and Chamber of Deputies elections. Although it failed to win any senatorial mandates, it took a single seat in the Chamber, which went to Cazimir. In his early speeches at Cervantes, Cazimir had joked that they only ran in elections "because I was tired of things going smooth." In his Pruteanu interview, he noted being serious about capturing the vote: "our main effort at the present time is not the recruitment of new members, but the earning of electoral sympathies and trust. Once we will win the votes, we will also bring in new members." Cazimir used his speaking time in Chamber mainly to popularize the sayings of Caragiale and Ion Creangă, as well as his own epigrams. At times, he also expressed mild criticism of the FSN as the party of "dead roses", and commented negatively on the June 1990 Mineriad, braving threats of violence from the Front's working-class electorate.

Various commentators see the PLS as a tool for the FSN's alleged plan to stifle or ridicule serious opposition. Radu Câmpeanu, chairman of the National Liberal Party–Câmpeanu, once suggested that the PSL's very creation had served someone else's "political interests", adding that he did not known whether Cazimir had been aware of that being the case: "Some serve [such interests] whether they know it or not". In November 1991, columnist Cornel Nistorescu proposed that Cazimir may have taken his seat through electoral fraud carried out by the FSN, and that his activity was meant to glamorize political apathy; this view was endorsed by the staff writers at România Literară, who called Cazimir and his followers the "humorless humorists". Also at România Literară, columnist Alex. Ștefănescu, a member of the opposition National Peasants' Party (PNȚCD), saw it as a "sociological oddity" that "a parody of a party was taken seriously by the voters". Journalist George Baltac believes that the PLS "deliberately" helped the FSN to fragment the PNȚCD's voting weight with "an explosion of minuscule parties." He notes that Cazimir, as a "left-wing intellectual", had a personal relationship with Iliescu. In a 2006 piece, writer Cătălin Mihuleac described the PLS doctrines as an "idiotic jest" (hlizeala idioată), arguing that Caragiale would have never approved of it; he described Cazimir and his group as a toxic influence on Romanian politics. Likewise, commentator Andrei Manolescu argues that "[Cazimir's] humor and irony turned into actual opportunism."

=== Demise ===
During the early months of 1991, the FSN engaged in talks with all other parliamentary groups, in order to obtain support for a Third Roman cabinet. Speaking for the PLS, Cazimir ridiculed the move in a widely quoted, television interview: observing that the FSN had 66% of parliamentary seats, with all other 15 parties only holding the remainder, he declared that a coalition government would have resembled "Gulliver and 15 dwarfs". Late that year, Theodor Stolojan, the Prime Minister-designate, held talks with all parliamentary parties, including the PLS, in an effort to secure backing for his own government team. His move reportedly angered the larger parties. Although the legislation updated in 1992 provided an election threshold, which harmed its chances, the PLS continued to be active, and staged high-profile stunts. In one such event, its delegation to Brussels made Manneken Pis an honorary party member.

The party also contested the February 1992 elections for local councils. It fielded 75 candidates for the General Council of Bucharest (the maximum allowed by law), and was acclaimed by independent observers for the high quality of its recruitment base: 14 of the candidates were from the various liberal arts, including four journalists. The PLS also endorsed Tudor Popescu as its candidate for Bucharest Mayor. This strategy contrasted its approach to other urban centers—in Brașov, it only had one candidate for the local council. In the end, it elected several councilors throughout the country, and only one at Bucharest. At Iași, the PLS endorsed Mandache Leocov of the Romanian Democratic Convention for the mayoral office; its list for the local council was headlined by physician René Corneliu Duda, who managed to obtain a seat. Mayoral elections also took place at Tîrgu Mureș in April 1992. In preparation for these, the PLS joined an electoral pact, or "Mureș Democratic Alliance", alongside the FSN (now opposing Stolojan), the PNȚCD, the National Unity Party, the Democratic Agrarianists, the Democratic Ecologists, the Union of the Roma, and other groups; this was designed to block out a perceived partnership between government and the Democratic Alliance of Hungarians, at a time when the latter was dominating city politics.

In the presidential and parliamentary elections of September, Iliescu tried out for a second term as President of Romania, with backing from the Democratic National Salvation Front (FDSN). His ticket was also endorsed by three other groups—the Humanist Party, the Socialist Democratic Party, and the PLS. On August 26, three of four members of the PLS permanent bureau (Boșman, Cornișteanu, and Vasile Groza) went public with their opposition to this move, attributing it to Cazimir as the fourth man. They voted to expel Cazimir from the bureau permanently, and also to strip him of his party membership for a nine-months "gestation period". This resulted in the PSL losing its only parliamentary seat; it fielded candidates in 24 counties, but acknowledged that it had no hope of passing the threshold. While Iliescu managed to be reconfirmed during the election, the PLS vote share fell to 0.1%.

Cazimir appeared on the FDSN list of candidates for a Bucharest precinct, and later joined the consolidated pro-Iliescu group, eventually called Social Democratic Party (PSD). Such shifts were ridiculed by literary scholar Alexandru George, who invoked them in a 1996 polemic with Cazimir over Caragiale's political views:

A group of intellectuals who, decade upon decade, have stood as members a totalitarian organization—under whose shadow, even if they committed no great evils, they still drew benefits for their own self-enrichment, and in any case endorsed The Regime—now, when the revolution has been won for them by other people, have come to establish a farcical party of their own—precisely one whose primary purpose is to endorse The Regime, yet again...

Writing in 1999, Ștefănescu suggested that Cazimir had never properly explained his own defection: "at some point he dropped his joking with the PLS and transferred toward [the PSD], a party that has led Romania into a position which is not at all joyful." Interviewed in 2010, Cazimir noted that his own entry into the PSD was a continuation of PLS goals. Many other members of the PLS were similarly recruited by the PSD. They included councilor Duda, whose son, Radu Duda, married Margareta of Romania and became titular royal consort of Romania; this paradox was highlighted in the press, which commented on the PSD's staunch republicanism. In a 2003 article, Lucian Gheorghiu suggested that the PSD had "gobbled up" the PSL as a whole in 1996. The PLS–PSD continuity was highlighted by journalist Dumitru Tinu, who attended the PSD conference of January 1997, where he reported hearing Cazimir "free-changing clowning" (clovnerii liber-schimbiste), played out in front of a new public.

Both Pruteanu and Cazimir were elected as PSD parliamentarians in November 2000, but found themselves taking opposite sides on issues such as linguistic protectionism. In discussing the issue, Pruteanu noted that Cazimir was still flippant, a man of derizoriu liber-schimbist ("paltry free-change"). A rump PLS had continued to exist for part of that interval. Cornișteanu, who succeeded Cazimir as ad-interim president, argues that he had "betrayed" the party statues, and notes that he was consequently listed as an "abandoned member". The group was ultimately disbanded in 1996 when new rules required that any party should have at least 10,000 members, or, according to Cornișteanu, when it could no longer support itself financially. Despite publishing a history of the party in 1998, when he was referred to as its "ex-president", Cazimir viewed the PLS as undissolvable. According to him, it still technically existed by 2010, because its own statutory clauses encouraged all members to join other parties.

== Electoral history ==
=== Legislative elections ===
Election	Chamber			Senate			Position	Aftermath
Election	Votes	%	Seats	Votes	%	Seats	Position	Aftermath
1990	47,017	0.34	1 / 395	46,247	0.33	0 / 119	13th	Support to FSN government (1990–1991)
1990	47,017	0.34	1 / 395	46,247	0.33	0 / 119	13th	Support to FSN-PNL-MER-PDAR government (1991–1992)
1992	12,360	0.11	0 / 341	8,720	0.07	0 / 143	38th	Extra-parliamentary support to PDSR-PUNR-PRM-PSM government (1992–1996)
