= Bellwether (politics) =

District or province that tracks larger political changes

A bellwether is a leader or an indicator of trends. In politics, the term often applies in a metaphorical sense to characterize a geographic region where political tendencies match in microcosm those of a wider area, such that the result of an election in the smaller region might predict the eventual result in the larger region.

== Overview ==
Map highlighting in red five bellwethers who since 1965 have voted for the winning candidate in the second round of presidential elections in Metropolitan France. Loire, in the south-east is the most populous, close to Lyon.

In politics, a bellwether can apply in a metaphorical sense to a geographic region where political tendencies match in microcosm those of a wider area, such that the result of an election in the former region might predict the eventual result in the latter. In a Westminster-style election, for example, a constituency, the control of which tends frequently to change, can have a popular vote that mirrors the result on a national scale. An electoral bellwether can be a ward, precinct, town, county, or other district that accurately reflects how a geographic region (state, province, etc.) will vote during elections. Bellwethers change over time and sometimes can only be accurately identified in retrospect, with election cycles with major shifts sometimes called "realignments" that shake up the status of which areas are bellwethers. Bellwethers can also differ by the type of elections: a bellwether in a general election can differ from a party primary bellwether.

== Specific countries ==
=== Australia ===
In Australian federal elections, the Division of Robertson in New South Wales became the nation's new longest-running bellwether seat, continuously won by the party that also won government since the 1983 federal election. Previously, the electoral division of Eden-Monaro elected its Member of Parliament from the party which won government at every federal election from 1972 until 2016, when the record was broken after Labor won the seat, while the Coalition won government. The Division of Lindsay in NSW, has elected its Member of Parliament from the party which won government in every Federal election since its creation in 1984 until 2016. Both Lindsay and Eden-Monaro lost their bellwether status at the 2016 federal election, both electing Labor MPs, despite a narrow Coalition win nationwide.

The Division of Makin in South Australia was a bellwether division from 1984 to 2010, although ceased its bellwether record in 2013, when Makin stayed Labor as the Coalition regained power nationwide. Also, in terms of nationwide two party preferred vote, Eden-Monaro, Lindsay, Robertson and Makin have bucked the bellwether trend in the past by voting Liberal at the 1998 federal election. In purely statistical terms, the state of New South Wales, which has the largest population of any Australian state or territory, could also be considered a "bellwether", as, until the 2016 federal election the party which wins government has won the majority of House of Representatives seats in that state at every election since 1963. Unlike many bellwethers, these are cited by analysts solely for their record and are not usually attributed to demographic factors that reflect the median of Australia.

==== List of electorates described as bellwethers ====
Below are seats that have been classified as bellwether seats won by the party forming government at least once at one of the past 10 elections. Below the winning party is the two-party-preferred vote.

Electorate	State/territory	Winning party									
Electorate	State/territory	Government elected									
Electorate	State/territory	1998	2001	2004	2007	2010	2013	2016	2019	2022	2025
Electorate	State/territory	Lib/Nat Coalition			Labor		Lib/Nat Coalition			Labor	
Electorate	State/territory	50.98%	51.03%	52.79%	52.70%	50.12%	53.49%	50.36%	51.53%	52.13%	54.83%
Electorate	State/territory	Seat winner									
Electorate	State/territory	1998	2001	2004	2007	2010	2013	2016	2019	2022	2025
Bass	TAS	Labor		Liberal	Labor		Liberal	Labor	Liberal		Labor
Bass	TAS	50.06%	52.06%	52.63%	51.00%	56.74%	54.04%	56.09%	50.41%	51.43%	57.92%
Braddon	TAS	Labor		Liberal	Labor		Liberal	Labor	Liberal		Labor
Braddon	TAS	54.33%	55.96%	51.13%	51.44%	57.48%	52.56%	52.20%	53.09%	58.03%	57.24%
Chisholm	VIC	Labor						Liberal		Labor	
Chisholm	VIC	52.07%	52.77%	52.65%	57.38%	56.11%	51.60%	51.24%	50.57%	56.41%	55.76%
Corangamite	VIC	Liberal			Labor		Liberal		Labor		
Corangamite	VIC	54.50%	55.67%	55.32%	50.85%	50.41%	53.94%	53.13%	51.07%	57.60%	58.10%
Dobell	NSW	Labor	Liberal		Labor		Liberal	Labor			
Dobell	NSW	53.35%	50.38%	55.90%	53.90%	55.07%	50.68%	54.81%	51.50%	56.52%	59.28%
Eden-Monaro	NSW	Liberal			Labor		Liberal	Labor			
Eden-Monaro	NSW	50.18%	51.69%	52.14%	53.40%	54.24%	50.61%	52.93%	50.85%	58.20%	57.35%
Forde	QLD	Liberal			Labor	Liberal National					Labor
Forde	QLD	55.25%	57.38%	62.98%	52.91%	51.63%	54.38%	50.63%	58.60%	54.23%	51.78%
Hasluck	WA	Did not exist	Labor	Liberal	Labor	Liberal				Labor	
Hasluck	WA	Did not exist	51.78%	51.82%	51.26%	50.57%	54.87%	52.05%	55.21%	56.00%	66.29%
Leichhardt	QLD	Liberal			Labor	Liberal National					Labor
Leichhardt	QLD	54.05%	56.39%	60.00%	54.01%	54.55%	55.68%	53.95%	54.17%	53.44%	56.09%
Lindsay	NSW	Liberal			Labor		Liberal	Labor	Liberal		
Lindsay	NSW	51.28%	55.47%	55.26%	56.78%	51.12%	52.99%	51.11%	55.04%	56.34%	53.08%
Longman	QLD	Liberal			Labor	Liberal National		Labor	Liberal National		
Longman	QLD	50.92%	52.72%	57.66%	53.57%	51.92%	56.92%	50.79%	53.28%	53.03%	50.13%
Lyons	TAS	Labor					Liberal	Labor			
Lyons	TAS	60.61%	58.17%	53.68%	58.78%	62.29%	51.22%	52.31%	55.18%	50.92%	61.51%
Makin	SA	Liberal			Labor						
Makin	SA	50.94%	53.76%	50.93%	57.70%	62.20%	55.06%	59.65%	59.72%	60.80%	64.87%
McEwen	VIC	Liberal				Labor					
McEwen	VIC	51.04%	51.20%	56.42%	50.01%	55.32%	50.15%	57.85%	55.02%	53.28%	54.65%
Page	NSW	National			Labor		National				
Page	NSW	52.36%	52.77%	54.23%	52.36%	54.19%	52.52%	52.30%	59.45%	60.74%	59.31%
Petrie	QLD	Liberal			Labor		Liberal National				Labor
Petrie	QLD	50.75%	53.42%	57.92%	52.02%	52.51%	50.53%	51.65%	58.40%	54.44%	51.09%
Robertson	NSW	Liberal			Labor		Liberal			Labor	
Robertson	NSW	52.01%	56.98%	56.81%	50.11%	51.00%	53.00%	51.14%	54.24%	52.26%	59.18%
Solomon	NT	Did not exist	Country Liberal		Labor	Country Liberal		Labor			
Solomon	NT	Did not exist	50.09%	52.81%	50.19%	51.75%	51.40%	56.00%	53.08%	59.37%	51.27%

=== Canada ===
In the Canadian province of Ontario, Sarnia—Lambton (and its predecessor ridings) voted for the winning party in every federal election from 1963 until 2011. This streak was broken in 2015, when the Conservative Party held the district while the Liberal Party won government, and the riding has become reliably Conservative since—although unusually, Conservative MP Marilyn Gladu crossed the floor to the Liberals in 2026. Toronto—St. Paul's has only elected three opposition MPs since it contested its first election, as St. Paul's, in 1935, although it has become reliably Liberal in recent years. Burlington and St. Catharines currently share the longest active streak, having elected an MP from the winning party since 1984. Also in Ontario, Peterborough—Kawartha (called Peterborough until 2015) has consistently elected the party which has won the provincial election since 1977. In federal politics, the coterminous federal electoral district Peterborough—Kawartha (also called Peterborough until 2015) elected a member of the winning party from 1965 to 1979 and 1984 until 2021, inclusive.

In Alberta, the provincial electoral district Peace River has elected only three opposition MLAs since the province was founded in 1905. In Manitoba, the federal district of Winnipeg South has voted for the winning party in each election since it was re-formed in 1988; a previous version of the same riding, which elected MPs from 1917 until 1974 inclusive, voted against the national winner only three times, most recently in 1965. Also in Manitoba, the provincial riding of Rossmere, which has existed since 1969, has voted for the candidate from the governing party in every general election since it was first contested except for that of 1977; it also elected opposition MLAs at by-elections in 1979 and 1993.

=== Germany ===
Since the creation of the Federal Republic of Germany (then West Germany) in 1949, the state where the leading party list vote (Zweitstimmen) matched the party of the subsequently chosen Chancellor the most times is Schleswig-Holstein (with two misses: 1969 and 2005), followed by the state of Lower Saxony (with misses in 1949, 1969 and 2005). Both states lie in the North of the country, neither containing many large industrial cities (the biggest being Kiel and Hannover respectively), nor large rural Catholic populations, the traditional base of the SPD and CDU/CSU respectively. Schleswig-Holstein is also famous for having had several state elections result in a one-seat majority for the winning coalition and Lower Saxony's 1998 election (in which Gerhard Schröder was the SPD candidate) is often seen as a "trial run" for the subsequent federal election (which Schröder also won). Of the first vote constituencies (Erststimmen), the constituency of Pinneberg (also located in Schleswig-Holstein) has voted for the party of the subsequently chosen Chancellor in all elections except for 1949.

Both the 1949 and the 1969 elections were rather narrow, the former resulting in a one-vote majority in the election for chancellor and the latter resulting in a 12-seat majority that had broken down due to defections by 1972. In 2005 SPD and CDU/CSU were only separated by one percentage point and four seats in the final tally. In the 2021 German federal election the SPD placed first in 12 out of 16 states, including Schleswig-Holstein and Lower Saxony as well as federally while being led by former First Mayor of Hamburg, Olaf Scholz, the State of Hamburg borders both Lower Saxony and Schleswig-Holstein, but Scholz did not run in Hamburg during that election, instead representing the District Potsdam – Potsdam-Mittelmark II – Teltow-Fläming II in Brandenburg (where he incidentally ran against Annalena Baerbock candidate for chancellor of Alliance 90/The Greens, drawing additional media attention to the District).

=== India ===
Valsad Lok Sabha constituency has successfully voted for the victorious party in every general elections in India. Furthermore, the party that wins the majority of seats in Delhi has always gone on to form the national government since 1998. The state of Uttar Pradesh is also seen as a bellwether, with the national government having been formed the majority of times by the party that won the most seats in the state.

=== Indonesia ===
For the past five elections, there have been 12 provinces where, if a presidential candidate wins them, it is guaranteed that they win the general election. Those 12 provinces are Bangka Belitung Islands, Central Java, North Sumatra, Central Kalimantan, North Sulawesi, East Java, Yogyakarta, Lampung, Papua, Riau Islands, Jakarta, and Central Sulawesi.

=== Ireland ===
Ireland has a proportional representation electoral system, in which politicians are elected by the single transferable vote. Bellwethers here can only be measured by the number of candidates from each side elected to Ireland's multiple-seat constituencies that elect an odd number of members. Between the 1981 general election and 2011 general election, Meath and its successors, Meath East and Meath West, have elected a majority of Fianna Fáil TDs in years when Fianna Fáil formed the government, and a majority of Fine Gael and Labour TDs when those parties formed the government.

=== New Zealand ===
In New Zealand, there are three generally accepted bellwether electorates: Hamilton East and Hamilton West, both based around the city of Hamilton, and Northcote on Auckland's North Shore. Hamilton West and Northcote missed one election each since they were first contested in 1969 and 1996 respectively — the 1993 election for Hamilton West and the 2005 election for Northcote. Hamilton East, first contested in 1972, has missed three elections — 1993, 1999, and 2005. They were all held by the National Party in the 2017 election although Labour formed the government after the election. Since the National Party was still returned as the largest party in Parliament, however, the two electorates did in fact retain their bellwether status, albeit to a limited extent.

=== Philippines ===
In the Philippines, the winner of the Philippine presidential election has won in Negros Oriental in all instances since 1935 except for 1961 and 2016, and in Basilan since its creation in December 1973 (first election in 1981). After Negros Oriental voted for the runner-up in 2016, Agusan del Norte and Lanao del Sur then had the longest active streak, having its provincial winners be the elected president since the 1969 election. Lanao del Sur then voted for the loser in 2022, giving Agusan del Norte the longest streak. For vice presidential elections, Pangasinan has voted for the winner in all elections save for 1986 and 2016.

=== Portugal ===
In every general election to the Portuguese National Assembly since the restoration of democracy in 1975, the electoral district of Braga has voted for the party or coalition that has won the most seats in the election. (Note that following the elections of 2015, a minority government was eventually formed by the second-largest party in the Assembly.) In every general, European Union, mayoral (except 2009), or presidential elections since the Carnation Revolution, the Portuguese capital of Lisbon voted for the party or coalition that won the highest percentage in the elections.

=== Romania ===
Presidential elections

The counties that voted in the first round for the winning candidate:

- Bucharest - 1 miss (2014), from 1990 on. The highest rate (88%, 7/8). The longest continuous streak (6 in a row: 1990–2009).
- Constanța - 1 miss (2014), from 1990 on. The highest rate (88%, 7/8). The longest continuous streak (6 in a row: 1990–2009).
- Alba - 2 misses (1992 and 2000), from 1990 on (75%, 6/8). The longest continuous streak, still active (4 in a row: 2004–2019).
- Arad - 2 misses (1992 and 2000), from 1990 on (75%, 6/8). The longest continuous streak, still active (4 in a row: 2004–2019).
- Bihor - 2 misses (1992 and 2000), from 1990 on (75%, 6/8). The longest continuous streak, still active (4 in a row: 2004–2019).
- Brașov - 2 misses (1992 and 2000), from 1990 on (75%, 6/8). The longest continuous streak, still active (4 in a row: 2004–2019).
- Cluj - 2 misses (1992 and 2000), from 1990 on (75%, 6/8). The longest continuous streak, still active (4 in a row: 2004–2019).
- Sibiu - 2 misses (1992 and 2000), from 1990 on (75%, 6/8). The longest continuous streak, still active (4 in a row: 2004–2019).
- Timiș - 2 misses (1992 and 2000), from 1990 on (75%, 6/8). The longest continuous streak, still active (4 in a row: 2004–2019).
- Prahova - 2 misses (1996 and 2014), from 1990 on (75%, 6/8).
- Ilfov - 2 misses (2004 and 2014), from 1990 on (75%, 6/8).
- Bistrița-Năsăud - 3 misses (1992, 2000 and 2004), from 1990 on (63%, 5/8).
- Satu Mare - 3 misses (1992, 2000 and 2004), from 1990 on (63%, 5/8).
- Sălaj - 3 misses (1992, 2000 and 2004), from 1990 on (63%, 5/8).
- Maramureș - 3 misses (1996, 2000 and 2004), from 1990 on (63%, 5/8).
- Suceava - 3 misses (1996, 2004 and 2014), from 1990 on (63%, 5/8).
- Caraș-Severin - 3 misses (2000, 2004 and 2014), from 1990 on (63%, 5/8).

=== Sweden ===
The expression "Som Ljungby röstar röstar Sverige" ('As Ljungby votes, Sweden votes') was coined in the early-1970s, but more recently (in 2006) voting results in Karlstad, Kalmar, and Halmstad more closely resembled the result of the whole nation in elections to the Riksdag. While since long having shifted right versus the national results, by 2022 this had further extended. In that election Ljungby was 17 points more to the right than Sweden in general.

According to Statistics Sweden, election results in Karlstad were the closest to the national results for three consecutive elections around the turn of the 21st century, a fact often highlighted by media through Gallup Polls showing voting intentions in the area. Karlstad swung to the left in the 2010s and by 2022 was seven points to the left of Sweden. Therefore, Karlstad is no longer a proper bellwether town. By 2022, the status of bellwethers in Sweden often moved to post-industrial towns for differences between the various municipalities, but also some commuter towns being candidates. This status shifted rapidly due to the big cities moving to the left and smaller towns to the right. Among sizeable municipalities that came within half a point of the national average in 2022 included Alingsås, Borlänge, Gävle and Karlskoga. These municipalities were won by the right coalition with narrow margins. In addition, several smaller municipalities came close to the national coalition differential, although no locations closely mirrored exact party results.

=== United Kingdom ===
United Kingdom constituencies of the House of Commons all see at least small boundary changes every so often over the decades to avoid malapportionment, with the exception of a tiny number of totally unchanging island seats. It may perhaps be possible to quibble about the claims of one or two long-term bellwether seats, citing such changes. However, those listed below have kept at least the bulk of their electorates during a series of boundary reviews, whilst also matching the national result over a significant number of general elections.

Long-running bellwether constituencies

- Dartford, in Kent, has reflected correctly the overall national result (i.e. of the ‘winning’ Party that gained a plurality of seats) at every general election since 1964. It is currently the longest-running bellwether constituency in the U.K.
- Hertford and Stevenage/Stevenage, Loughborough, Northampton North, Portsmouth North and Watford have reflected every result since the February 1974 election.
- Rochester and Chatham/Medway/Rochester and Strood has reflected the overall result in every general election since October 1974.
- Blackpool North/Blackpool North and Fleetwood/Blackpool North and Cleveleys, Burton/Burton and Uttoxeter, Dover/Dover and Deal, Faversham/Sittingbourne and Sheppey, Finchley/Finchley and Golders Green, Gillingham/Gillingham and Rainham, Gloucester, Lowestoft/Waveney, Stourbridge, Hendon, Stafford and Stone/Stafford and Worcester have all reflected the overall result in every general election since 1979.
- Amber Valley, Broxtowe, Calder Valley, Corby, Erewash, Harlow, Hastings and Rye, Norwich North, Reading West, South Derbyshire, and South Ribble constituencies have reflected every national result since 1983.
- Cannock Chase, Chatham and Aylesford, Redditch, North Warwickshire/North Warwickshire and Bedworth, Nuneaton, Tamworth, and Thurrock have reflected the overall result in every general election since 1997.

Former bellwether constituencies

- Gravesham (and its predecessor Gravesend) has reflected the overall result from 1955 with the only exception being Adam Holloway’s win for the Conservative Party in the 2005 general election.
- Lincoln has reflected the result since the October 1974 election with the only exception being 2017.
- Bristol North West reflected every result since the October 1974 election until 2017.
- Brentford and Isleworth had reflected the overall result from 1979 until 2015.
- Rossendale and Darwen has been a bellwether since 1983, with one exception in the 1992 General Election, electing Labour MP Janet Anderson whilst the country elected a Conservative government.
- Bury North has reflected the overall result from 1983, with the only exception being 2017.
- Basildon reflected every result from its creation in 1974 to its abolition in 2010.
- Pudsey reflected the overall result in every general election since 1979 until its abolition in 2024.
- Southampton Test reflected every result from 1966 to 2010.
- Luton South (and its predecessors Luton East and Luton) had reflected the overall result from 1951 until 2010.
- Keighley/Keighley and Ilkley has previously been a bellwether since 1959, with three exceptions: in 1979 and 2017, when the seat leaned to the left but the Tories formed a government; and in 2024, when the Conservative candidate held the seat amidst a Labour landslide victory.
- Staffordshire Moorlands reflected the national result from its creation in 1983 until it elected a Conservative MP amidst a Labour landslide in 2024.

While not strictly a bellwether, Sunderland South (Labour since 1964) was often used in election TV and radio programming to predict the swing of a general election, principally because it was often the first to declare, although with variable accuracy.

==== London Borough elections ====
Since Greater London formed during 1964–1965, Hammersmith and Fulham London Borough Council elections have matched those of the party who run (usually with the GLA, or more lately Mayor of London and Assembly) the most London authorities except its "miss" of Labour's majority of London councils in 2010 (which has endured since) and the reverse miss in 1978 and 1982. In the latter two results no overall control was the local result.

==== Scottish Parliament ====
The constituencies of Cunninghame North and Stirling have all elected MSPs from the party which won the plurality of seats in the election overall for every Scottish Parliament election. Na h-Eileanan an Iar was a bellwether seat until the 2026 Scottish Parliament election, in which it elected Scottish Labour MSP Donald MacKinnon over incumbent SNP MSP Alasdair Allan.

The constituencies of Almond Valley, Dundee City West, Edinburgh Eastern, Glasgow Southside, Kilmarnock and Irvine Valley, and Mid Fife and Glenrothes each elected an MSP from the largest party in the 2011 and 2016 elections. This continues the trend that their predecessor constituencies (Livingston, Dundee West, Edinburgh East & Musselburgh, Glasgow Govan, Kilmarnock & Loudoun and Fife Central) achieved in the 1999, 2003 and 2007 elections.

=== United States ===
The American states with the current longest streak of voting for the winners in the electoral college are Michigan, Pennsylvania, and Wisconsin; their streaks date back to 2008. The American bellwether states can also be determined in different ways (with respect to presidential elections):

Highest percentage for varying lengths of time

- Nevada – 2 misses (1976, 2016) from 1912 on (93.1%, evenly wrong).
- Ohio – 3 misses (1944, 1960, 2020) from 1896 on (90.9%, slightly "too Republican").
- Florida – 3 misses (1960, 1992, 2020) from 1928 on (88.0%, slightly "too Republican").

Highest percentage for a set length of time

Electoral record of the states for presidential elections, 1896–2024:

- Ohio – 30 wins out of 33 elections (90.9%)
- New Mexico – 25 wins out of 29 elections (86.2%)
- Nevada – 28 wins out of 33 elections (84.8%)

Highest percentage of the current party system, 1980–2024

- Ohio – 1 miss (2020) (91.7%)
- Nevada – 1 miss (2016) (91.7%)
- Florida – 2 misses (1992, 2020) (83.3%)
- Michigan – 2 misses (2000, 2004) (83.3%)
- Pennsylvania – 2 misses (2000, 2004) (83.3%)

Smallest deviation from the national average

Another way to measure how much a state's results reflect the national average is how far the state deviates from the national results. The states with the least deviation from a two-party presidential vote from 1896 to 2012 include:

- Ohio – 2.2%
- New Mexico – 2.8%
- Illinois – 3.6%
- Missouri – 3.7%
- Delaware – 3.7%

States that were considered bellwether states from the mid-to-late 20th century include:

- Delaware – Perfect from 1952 to 1996. As a result of a massive Democrat-strong growth in housing/population in New Castle County, Delaware (suburban Philadelphia, with the old industrial city of Wilmington), voters tend to lean strongly Democratic. That county had been a bellwether: 1936 to 1996.
- Arizona – Perfect from 1912 to 1956.
- North Dakota – Perfect from 1896 to 1936.
- Kansas – Perfect from 1900 to 1936.
- Missouri was often referred to as the Missouri bellwether as it produced the same outcome as the national results in the presidential election 96.2% of the time for the century between 1904 and 2004, only missing in 1956. It is considered to have lost its bellwether status with the 2008 presidential election.
- Washington – 1 miss from 1900 to 1956 (in 1912).
- Minnesota – 1 miss from 1920 to 1976 (in 1968).
- Texas – 1 miss from 1928 to 1988 (in 1968).
- Arkansas – 1 miss from 1960 to 2004 (in 1968).
- Idaho – 2 misses (1960, 1976) from 1904 to 1988.
- Tennessee – 2 misses (1924, 1960) from 1912 to 2004.
- New Jersey – 2 misses (1948, 1976) from 1920 to 1996.
- Virginia – 2 misses (1960, 1976) from 1928 to 1988. Was traditionally Republican at the time. Otherwise, the state was traditionally Democratic. Although the 2012 election was not included in this bellwether run, Virginia was actually the closest state to the national vote in 2012. Donald Trump, however, managed to win in 2016 and 2024 without Virginia.
- Illinois – 3 misses (1884, 1916, 1976) from 1852 to 1996, the most reliable in this period. As the Chicago metropolitan area shifted to become overwhelmingly Democratic, the state lost its bellwether status. No Republican had ever won the White House without taking Illinois prior to 2000.
- California – 3 misses (1912, 1960, 1976) from 1888 to 1996.
- Utah – 3 misses (1912, 1960, 1976) from 1900 to 1988.
- Wyoming – 3 misses (1944, 1960, 1976) from 1900 to 1988.
- Montana – 3 misses (1960, 1976, 1996) from 1904 to 2004.
- New Mexico – 3 misses (1976, 2000, 2016) from 1912 to 2020.
- Kentucky – 3 misses (1920, 1952, 1960) from 1912 to 2004.
- Oklahoma – 3 misses (1924, 1960, 1976) from 1912 to 1988.
- New Hampshire – 3 misses (1948, 1960, 1976) from 1936 to 2000.
- Colorado – 3 misses (1960, 1976, 1996) from 1948 to 2012.
- Iowa – 3 misses (1976, 1988, 2000) from 1964 to 2016.

Historic bellwether states:

- Pennsylvania – One miss from 1800 to 1880 (in 1824).
- Indiana – One miss from 1852 to 1912 (in 1876).
- Wisconsin – One miss from 1860 to 1912 (in 1884).
- New York – One miss from 1880 to 1944 (in 1916). It previously had a perfect streak from 1816 to 1852. Had the most electoral votes during the entire period.

The Territory of Guam had no misses from 1984 to 2012 (100.0%); it lacks electoral college votes, but conducts a presidential straw vote on local election day. From 1996 through 2012, Ohio was within 1.85% of the national popular vote result. Due to the Electoral College system, bellwethers of sufficient size form the focus of political attention and presidential campaigns as swing states. By 2016, Ohio and, with almost double its electors, Florida, were seen by political pundits and national campaigns as the most important swing states due to their large number of electoral votes and politically mixed breakdown. No Republican has won the presidency while losing Ohio, so the party campaigns there intensively.

The period from 1964 to 2016 ties Ohio with Pennsylvania, from 1828 to 1880, as the longest consecutive bellwether streak in US history. In the 2020 election Joe Biden defeated incumbent Donald Trump without winning either Ohio or Florida. He won Arizona, which no other Democratic candidate had won since 1996, and Georgia (of similar population size to Ohio), which no Democrat had since 1992. However, the rightward political shift of Ohio and Florida, which was modest in the 2016 and 2020 elections, accelerated greatly in 2024 with both states measuring double-digit margins toward the Republican party, more than ten points to the right of the national average. Thus, Georgia and Arizona are newer swing states, while Ohio and Florida appear less likely to swing back leftward. A 2008 analysis by American statistician Edward Tufte and his student Richard Sun picked certain counties as electoral bellwethers for the time, including Vigo County, IN; Lincoln County, MT; Van Buren County, AR; Logan County, AR; Eddy County, NM; and Ferry County, WA.

=== Others ===
==== Brazil ====
In Brazil's direct presidential elections, the winner has taken the state of Minas Gerais in 13 out of 14 elections from 1945 to 2026, the single miss being 1950. Since the adoption of the two-round system, the national winner has also won in Minas Gerais during both rounds, with the exception of 2026, when the state mirrored Luiz Inácio Lula da Silva's defeat in the first round and his later victory in the last round.

The state has more than 21 million residents, includes Belo Horizonte (the third-largest metropolitan area in Brazil) and has been birthplace of the record of nine presidents to date. Because of its varied topography, large area (larger than Metropolitan France) and significant share of national population (10.1%, second only to São Paulo), it is considered as a microcosm of Brazil's society and economics as a whole.

==== France ====
Since the substantial role began in 1958, under the French Fifth Republic, the president has since 1965 in the final (second) round always won: diminutive Ardèche and with about double its population each, Calvados, Charente-Maritime, Indre-et-Loire and Loire. Together these account for more than 3 million residents. Each combines urban with rural and many touristic sites.

==== South Korea ====
Since the 1987 presidential election, the central, thus somewhat mountainous, province of North Chungcheong is the only one of the 17 first-tier divisions in which the most voted candidate for the presidency has consistently become the national winner. It has more than one and half million residents.

==== Spain ====
Since democracy was restored in 1977, up to 2023 two provinces have always voted for the winning party (Zaragoza and Huesca). The Autonomous Community of Aragon hosts these provinces. Aragon is, moreover, the sole Autonomous Community to have done so. It has more than a million residents and combines much rural land with mountains and socially diverse urban communities.

==== Taiwan ====
From the first competitive multi-party elections in 1996, Changhua County, a west coast region of Taiwan of more than a million residents, is where the preference has matched the elected president.

== See also ==
- "As Maine goes, so goes the nation"
- Swing state
- Tipping-point state
- Will it play in Peoria?
