= Alliance for Romanian Unity =

Political alliance in Romania

The Alliance for Romanian Unity (Romanian: Alianța pentru Unitatea Românilor, AUR) was a political alliance in Romania. It had ties to the Romanian Hearth Union.

== History ==
The AUR was formed as an alliance of the Republican Party (PR) and the Romanian National Unity Party (PUNR). It received 2.1% of the Chamber of Deputies vote in the 1990 general elections, winning nine seats. It also received 2.2% of the Senate vote, winning two seats. All seats were taken by the PUNR.

The two parties contested the 1992 general elections separately; the PUNR nominated Gheorghe Funar as its presidential candidate, whilst the PR put forward Ioan Mânzatu. Funar finished third with 11% of the vote, whilst Mânzatu finished last of the six candidates with 3%. The PUNR won 14 Senate seats and 30 Chamber seats, whilst the PR failed to win seats in either house.

== Election results ==
=== Parliamentary elections ===
| Election | Chamber | | | Senate | | | Position | Status |
| Election | Votes | % | Seats | Votes | % | Seats | Position | Status |
|---|---|---|---|---|---|---|---|---|
| 1990 | 290,875 | 2.12 | 9 / 395 | 300,473 | 2.15 | 2 / 119 | 6th | Support to FSN government (1990–1991) |
| 1990 | 290,875 | 2.12 | 9 / 395 | 300,473 | 2.15 | 2 / 119 | 6th | Support to FSN–PNL–MER–PDAR government (1991–1992) |
