= Party of Young Free Democrats of Romania =

Defunct political party in Romania

The Party of Young Free Democrats of Romania (Romanian: Partidul Tineretului Liber Democrat din România, PTLDR) was a political party in Romania.

== History ==
The PTLDR contested the 1990 general elections, receiving around 0.3% of the vote in the Chamber of Deputies election and 0.2% in the Senate elections. Although it failed to win a seat in the Senate, the party won one seat in the Chamber.

In January 1992, the party merged into the Republican Party.

== Election results ==
=== Parliamentary elections ===
Election	Chamber			Senate			Position	Status
Election	Votes	%	Seats	Votes	%	Seats	Position	Status
1990	43,188	0.32	1 / 395	32,506	0.23	0 / 119	12th	Supported the FSN government (until October 1991)
1990	43,188	0.32	1 / 395	32,506	0.23	0 / 119	12th	Supported the FSN–PNL–MER–PDAR government
