= Democratic Party of Labour =

Political party in Romania

Democratic Party of Labour Partidul Democrat al Muncii
- Abbreviation: PDM
- Founded: 26 February 1990
- Dissolved: 24 October 1994
- Merged into: Democratic Party
- Ideology: Social democracy
- Political position: Centre-left

The Democratic Party of Labour (Romanian: Partidul Democrat al Muncii, PDM) was a political party in Romania.

== History ==
The PDM contested the 1990 general elections, receiving around 0.4% of the vote in the Chamber elections and 0.3% of the vote in the Senate elections. Although it failed to win a seat in the Senate, the party won a single seat in the Chamber. The 1992 elections saw the party's vote share in the Chamber elections fall to 0.03%, resulting in it losing its seat.

== Electoral history ==
=== Legislative elections ===
Election	Chamber			Senate			Position	Status
Election	Votes	%	Seats	Votes	%	Seats	Position	Status
1990	52,595	0.38	1 / 395	44,360	0.32	0 / 119	14th	Supported the FSN government (until October 1991)
1990	52,595	0.38	1 / 395	44,360	0.32	0 / 119	14th	Supported the FSN–PNL–MER–PDAR government
1992	3,888	0.03	0 / 341	2,933	0.02	0 / 143	51st	Extraparliamentary
