= Romanian National Party (1998–2000) =

Romanian National Party (PNR) was a political party in Romania.

In the spring of 1998, the Democratic Agrarian Party of Romania (PDAR) absorbed the New Romania Party and the Christian Liberal Party, forming a new party that adopted the name Romanian National Party (PNR). This move angered the Christian Democratic National Peasants' Party (PNȚCD), which, through Ion Rațiu, challenged the name in court. Ultimately, the court ruled in favor of the new party.

The main architect of these moves was Virgil Măgureanu, former head of the Romanian Intelligence Service (SRI), who was later elected as Secretary General of the PNR.

At that time, the president of the Romanian National Party was Virgil Măgureanu.

== History ==
After resigning from the leadership of the SRI, Virgil Măgureanu initially joined the New Romania Party, a party created by Ovidiu Trăsnea in 1994. Măgureanu's membership was the most important political moment in the existence of the New Romania Party.

14 March 1998: The Romanian National Party (PNR) was established following the merger of two political groups: Democratic Agrarian Party of Romania and the New Romania Party, which was joined, at the last moment, by the Christian Liberal Party (PLC).

7 September 1998: the court approved the merger of PDAR with the New Romania Party (PNR), led by Virgil Măgureanu. The new political formation was named the Romanian National Party. The party's president, Mihai Berca, stated that the political orientation of PNR, which had 150,000 members, was centre.

In March 1999, the president of PNR was Viorel Cataramă.

Before the November 2000 elections, in September 2000, PNR merged with PUNR (with which it had been negotiating since 1998),
