= AUR =

AUR, or aur, may refer to:

- Acute urinary retention
- African Union of Railways
- Alliance for Romanian Unity, a political alliance in the 1990s
- Alliance for the Union of Romanians, a nationalist political party
- American University of Rome
- Arch User Repository
- Aur Atoll, Marshall Islands
- Auriga constellation abbreviation, as standardized by the International Astronomical Union
- Aur Island, Malaysia
- AUR, the IATA code for A. A. Bere Tallo Airport in East Nusa Tenggara, Indonesia
- AUR, the National Rail code for Aberdour railway station in Scotland, UK
