= Liberal Union–Brătianu =

The Liberal Union–Brătianu (Romanian: Uniunea Liberală Brătianu, UL–B) was a political party in Romania.

== History ==
The UL–B contested the 1990 general elections, receiving around 0.3% of the vote in both the Chamber of Deputies elections and the Senate elections. Although it failed to win a seat in the Senate, the party won one seat in the Chamber, taken by Ion I. Brătianu. Despite increasing its vote share to 0.5% in the 1992 elections, the party lost its single seat.

The 2000 general elections saw the party receive just 3,760 votes (0.03%), again failing to win a seat. The party dissolved in 2003 after failing to re-register with the party registry.

== Electoral history ==
=== Legislative elections ===
| Election | Chamber | | | Senate | | | Position | Status |
| Election | Votes | % | Seats | Votes | % | Seats | Position | Status |
|---|---|---|---|---|---|---|---|---|
| 1990 | 36,869 | 0.27 | 1 / 395 | 35,943 | 0.26 | 0 / 119 | 15th | Opposition |
| 1992 | 54,673 | 0.50 | 0 / 341 | 48,222 | 0.44 | 0 / 143 | 16th | Extraparliamentary |
| 1996 | Did not compete | | | | | | | Extraparliamentary |
| 2000 | 3,760 | 0.03 | 0 / 345 | 7,373 | 0.07 | 0 / 140 | 29th | Extraparliamentary |
