= Romanian Socialist Democratic Party =

Defunct political party in Romania

Romanian Socialist Democratic Party Partidul Socialist Democratic Român
- Abbreviation: PSoDR
- Leader: Marius Cîrciumaru
- Founded: January 1990
- Dissolved: 1993
- Merged into: Party of Social Democracy in Romania
- Ideology: Democratic socialism
- Political position: Centre-left to far-left

The Romanian Socialist Democratic Party (Romanian: Partidul Socialist Democratic Român, PSoDR) was a political party in Romania. During its short existence it was easily mistaken for Romanian Social Democratic Party.

== History ==
Established by Marius Cîrciumaru in January 1990, the PSDR contested the 1990 general elections, receiving around 1.1% of the vote in both the Chamber and Senate elections. Although it failed to win a seat in the Senate, the party won five seats in the Chamber. The 1992 elections saw its vote share fall to 0.9%, resulting in it losing all five seats.

The party was dissolved in 1993 when it merged into the Party of Social Democracy.

== Election results ==
=== Legislative elections ===
Election	Chamber			Senate			Position	Status
Election	Votes	%	Seats	Votes	%	Seats	Position	Status
1990	143,393	1.05	5 / 395	152,989	1.10	0 / 119	9th	Supporting FSN government (1990–1991)
1990	143,393	1.05	5 / 395	152,989	1.10	0 / 119	9th	Supporting FSN–PNL–MER–PDAR government (1991–1992)
1992	94,154	0.86	0 / 341	60,708	0.55	0 / 143	13th	Extra-parliamentary (1992–1996)
