= Romanian Hearth Union =

Romanian civic organization

- Uniunea Vatra Românească
- Formation: February 1990
- Type: NGO
- Region served: Romania

The Romanian Hearth Union or Romanian Hearth Federation (Romanian: Uniunea Vatra Românească) is a far-right nationalist movement and civic organization, founded in Târgu Mureș in 1990.

One of the founding members of the Hearth Union was Ion Iliescu. The main purpose of the organization is to save Romanians "hunted down in their own country" from the Hungarians viewed as "hordes plaguing humanity". The emergence of the "Romanian Hearth" was helped by ex-Securitate officers. The organization has been described by various sources as quasi-fascist, radical nationalist, xenophobic ultra-nationalist, anti-Hungarian and antisemitic. It was associated with the former political party of Romanian National Unity Party (PUNR), but also had ties to the Social Democracy Party of Romania (PDSR), Greater Romania Party (PRM) and the Democratic Agrarian Party of Romania (PDAR).

The Union received support from the then-ruling National Salvation Front and President Iliescu, hoping to increase the popularity of the front in the area of Transylvania. In 1992, the Union had around 4 million supporters, and the PUNR formed electoral coalitions with Iliescu's Democratic National Salvation Front in several Transylvanian counties for the 1992 election. PUNR was part of the political coalition that governed Romania between 1992 and 1996.

== See also ==
- Ethnic clashes of Târgu Mureș
- Red Pentagon
