= National Reconstruction Party of Romania =

The National Reconstruction Party of Romania (Romanian: Partidul Reconstrucției Naționale din România, PRN) was a political party in Romania.

== History ==
The PRN contested the 1990 general elections, receiving around 0.4% of the vote for the Senate and 0.3% of the vote for the Chamber of Deputies. Although it failed to win a seat in the Senate, the party won a single seat in the Chamber.

== Electoral history ==
=== Legislative elections ===
Election	Chamber			Senate			Position	Status
Election	Votes	%	Seats	Votes	%	Seats	Position	Status
1990	43,808	0.32	1 / 395	52,465	0.38	0 / 119	12th	Opposition
