= Republican Party (Romania, 1990) =

The Republican Party (Romanian: Partidul Republican, PR) was a political party in Romania. In 1993 it merged with two other parties to create the Party of Social Democracy in Romania (PSDR), although some dissatisfied members created a party with the same name later the same year.

== History ==
The Republican Party contested the 1990 general elections as part of the Alliance for Romanian Unity (AUR), a nationalist political alliance formed with the Romanian National Unity Party (PUNR). The alliance received 2.1% of the Chamber of Deputies vote, winning nine seats. It also received 2.2% of the Senate vote, winning two seats. However, all of the seats were taken by the PUNR. The Republican Party contested the 1992 general elections alone, receiving 1.6% of the Chamber vote and failing to win a seat.

== Electoral history ==
=== Legislative elections ===
Election	Chamber			Senate			Position	Status
Election	Votes	%	Seats	Votes	%	Seats	Position	Status
1990	Part of the AUR		0 / 395	300,473	2.15	0 / 119	6th	Extraparliamentary
1992	177,056	1.63	0 / 341	205,988	1.88	0 / 143	11th	Extraparliamentary

=== Presidential elections ===
Election	Candidate	Votes	Percentage	Position
1992	Ioan Mânzatu	362,485	3.0	6th
