= Democratic Group of the Centre =

Political alliance in Romania

The Democratic Group of the Centre (Romanian: Grupul Democrat de Centru, GDC) was a political alliance in Romania. Its members were the Socialist-Liberal Party, the Cluj Democratic Party, and the Democratic Romanian Front 16-20.XII.1989 Timișoara. The alliance broke up after the 1990 general elections. The Socialist-Liberal Party (PSL) merged with PNL later that year. However, the former PSL leadership left PNL in 1992 to create PNL-CD.

== History ==
The GDC contested the 1990 general elections, receiving around 0.5% of the vote in both the Chamber and Senate elections. Although it failed to win a seat in the Senate, the party won two seats in the Chamber.

== Election results ==
=== Parliamentary elections ===
Election	Chamber			Senate			Position	Status
Election	Votes	%	Seats	Votes	%	Seats	Position	Status
1990	65,914	0.48	2 / 395	65,440	0.47	0 / 119	11th	Opposition
