= Union of the Ukrainians of Romania =

Union of the Ukrainians of Romania Uniunea Ucrainenilor din România Союз українців Румунії
- President: Nicolae-Miroslav Petrețchi
- Founded: 29 December 1989
- Registered: February 1990
- Headquarters: Strada Radu Popescu nr. 15, Sector 1, Bucharest
- Ideology: Ukrainian minority politics
- National affiliation: National Minorities Parliamentary Group
- Chamber of Deputies: 1 / 330
- Senate: 0 / 136
- European Parliament: 0 / 33

Website
- www.uur.ro

The Union of the Ukrainians of Romania (Romanian: Uniunea Ucrainenilor din România, UUR; Ukrainian: Союз українців Румунії, romanized: Soyuz Ukrayintsiv Rumuniyi, SUR) is an ethnic minority political party in Romania representing the Ukrainian community.

== History ==
The UUR contested the 1990 general elections, and despite receiving only 16,179 votes (0.12%), it won a single seat in the Chamber of Deputies under the electoral law that allows for political parties representing ethnic minority groups to be exempt from the electoral threshold. It has won a seat in every election since.

== Election results ==
Election	Chamber of Deputies			Senate		
Election	Votes	%	Seats	Votes	%	Seats
1990	16,179	0.12	1	8,310	0.06	0
1992	7,717	0.07	1	–	–	–
1996	7,165	0.06	1	–	–	–
2000	9,404	0.08	1	–	–	–
2004	10,888	0.11	1	–	–	–
2008	9,338	0.14	1	–	–	–
2012	7,353	0.10	1	–	–	–
2016	1,172	0.02	1	–	–	–
2020	5,458	0.09	1	–	–	–
