= Republican Party (Romania, 1993) =

Former Romanian political party

The Republican Party (Romanian: Partidul Republican, PR) was a micro political party in Romania created by former members from the party of the same name, dissatisfied by its merger into the Party of Social Democracy in Romania (PDSR at that time, currently PSD). It ceased activity before 2004, when the name was taken over by the Party of the Third Millenium.

== History ==
The Republican Party contested the 1996 elections receiving 0.14% (Chamber) and 0.16% (Senate), leaving the party seatless. The 2000 elections saw its votes share fall again to 0.10% and 0.11%.

== Electoral history ==
=== Legislative elections ===
Election	Chamber			Senate			Position	Status
Election	Votes	%	Seats	Votes	%	Seats	Position	Status
1996	17,190	0.14	0 / 343	20,273	0.16	0 / 143	29th	Extraparliamentary
2000	10,840	0.10	0 / 345	12,094	0.11	0 / 140	27th	Extraparliamentary
