= National Democratic Christian Party =

National Democratic Christian Party Partidul Național Democrat Creștin
- President: Oprea Niță
- Founded: 1990
- Dissolved: 2014
- Headquarters: Bucharest
- Ideology: Christian democracy Nationalism
- Seats in the Senate: 0
- Seats in the Chamber: 0
- Seats in the European Parliament: 0

Website
- www.pndc.com.ro

The National Democratic Christian Party (Romanian: Partidul Național Democrat Creştin) was a very small Romanian political party (i.e. a micro-party). It was not represented in the parliament. In the 2008 elections, it won only 316 votes (below 0.01%) for the Chamber of Deputies and 1,365 votes (0.02%) for the Senate.

Mainly a local party working in Prahova County and in the county capital Ploiești, the NDCP had five representatives in the county council and also two in the city council of Ploiești. The party subsequently dissolved in 2014.

== Electoral history ==
=== Legislative elections ===
Election	Chamber			Senate			Position	Aftermath
Election	Votes	%	Seats	Votes	%	Seats	Position	Aftermath
1992	11,472	0.10	0 / 341	13,356	0.12	0 / 143	33rd	Extra-parliamentary
1996	69,380	0.57	0 / 343	65,932	0.54	0 / 143	17th	Extra-parliamentary
2000	33,410	0.30	0 / 345	45,252	0.42	0 / 140	17th	Extra-parliamentary
2004	27,650	0.27	0 / 332	33,299	0.32	0 / 137	16th	Extra-parliamentary
2008	316	0.00	0 / 334	1,365	0.02	0 / 137	10th	Extra-parliamentary
2012	38	0.00	0 / 412	132	0.00	0 / 176	12th	Extra-parliamentary
