= Romanian National Unity Party =

Romanian National Unity Party Partidul Unității Națiunii Române
- President: Mircea Chelaru
- Founder: Gheorghe Funar
- Founded: 1990
- Dissolved: 2006
- Merged into: Conservative Party
- Ideology: 1990-2002: Romanian ultranationalism; Neoliberalism; 2002-2006: Social liberalism; Christian democracy; Pro-Europeanism
- Political position: 1990-2002: Right-wing to far-right; 2002-2006: Centre
- National affiliation: Alliance for Romanian Unity (1990)

The Romanian National Unity Party (Romanian: Partidul Unităţii Naţionale a Românilor, PUNR) was a nationalist political party in Romania between 1990 and 2006.

== History ==
The PUNR was the first nationalist party in post-communist Romania, created in 1990, with Gheorghe Funar emerging as its leader. In the 1990 general elections the party ran as part of the Alliance for Romanian Unity (AUR) alongside the Republican Party (PR). The alliance received 2.1% of the Chamber of Deputies vote in the 1990 general elections, winning nine seats. It also received 2.2% of the Senate vote, winning two seats.

Funar went on to become mayor of Cluj-Napoca. In that office, he would promote Romanian national symbols, especially the blue, yellow and red flag, throughout the city. He was the party's candidate for president in the 1992 general elections, finishing third with 11% of the vote. In the parliamentary elections the PUNR emerged as the fourth-largest party in Parliament, winning 14 seats in the Senate and 30 seats in the Chamber of Deputies.

Funar was the party's presidential candidate again in the 1996 elections, but finished sixth in a field of 16 candidates, receiving only 3.2% of the vote. The PUNR also lost seats in Parliament, being reduced to seven Senate seats and 18 seats in the Chamber of Deputies. The party did not nominate a presidential candidate in the 2000 elections, which saw its vote share fall to just 1.4%, resulting in it failing to cross the electoral threshold, losing its parliamentary representation.

Its last leader was former General Mircea Chelaru. Under his leadership, the party became more moderate. On 12 February 2006, the PUNR was absorbed into the Conservative Party (PC).

== Electoral history ==
=== Legislative elections ===
Election	Chamber			Senate			Position	Aftermath
Election	Votes	%	Seats	Votes	%	Seats	Position	Aftermath
1990	290,875	2.12	9 / 395	300,473	2.15	2 / 119	6th (within AUR) (Note: AUR members: PUNR (all the mandates) and the Republican Party (no mandates).)	Support to FSN government (1990–1991)
1990	290,875	2.12	9 / 395	300,473	2.15	2 / 119	6th (within AUR)	Support to FSN-PNL-MER-PDAR government (1991–1992)
1992	836,547	7.72	30 / 341	887,597	8.12	14 / 143	4th	PDSR-PUNR-PRM-PSM (1992–1996)
1996	533,384	4.36	18 / 343	518,962	4.22	7 / 143	6th	Opposition to CDR-USD-UDMR (1996–2000)
2000	149,525	1.38	0 / 345	154,761	1.42	0 / 140	9th	Extra-parliamentary support to PDSR minority government (2000–2004)
2004	53,222	0.52	0 / 332	56,414	0.55	0 / 137	10th	Extra-parliamentary support to DA-PUR-UDMR (2004–2007)

=== Presidential elections ===
Election	Candidate	First round			Second round		
Election	Candidate	Votes	%	Position	Votes	Percentage	Position
1990	did not compete						
1992	Gheorghe Funar	1,294,388	10.8	3rd			
1996	Gheorghe Funar	407,828	3.2	6th			
2000	did not compete						
2004	did not compete						

== See also ==
- Democratic Agrarian Party of Romania
- Democratic National Salvation Front
- Greater Romania Party
- Romanian Hearth Union
- Social Democracy Party of Romania
