= Otto Weber (politician) =

Romanian politician

Otto Weber (5 April 1921 in Făgăraș – 2 August 2001 in Bucharest) was a Romanian politician who served in the Chamber of Deputies from 1992 to 2000. He was a founding member and later president of the Romanian Ecologist Party (PER).
