= 1992 Romanian general election =

- Presidential election
- 27 September 1992 (first round); 11 October 1992 (second round)
- Turnout: 76.29% (first round) ▼9.91pp 73.23% (second round)
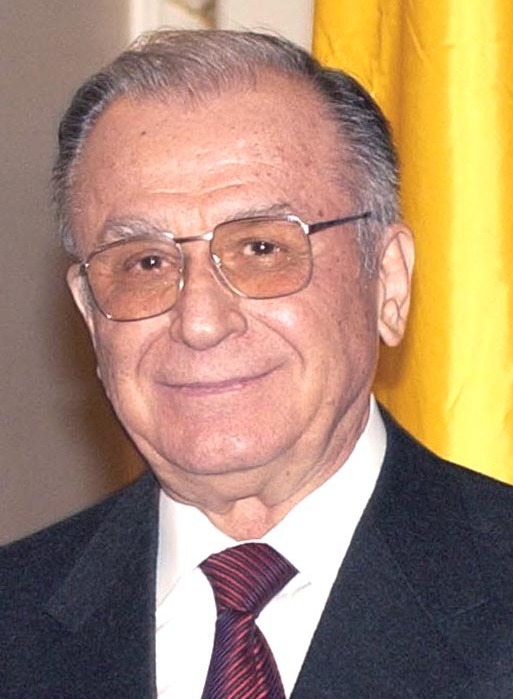

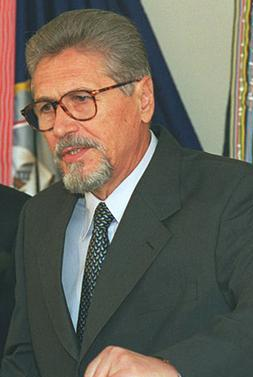
| Nominee | Ion Iliescu | Emil Constantinescu |
| Party | FDSN | CDR |
| Popular vote | 7,393,429 | 4,641,207 |
| Percentage | 61.43% | 38.57% |
Iliescu:
50–60%
60–70%
70–80%
80–90%
Constantinescu:
50–60%
60–70%
80–90%
President before election
Ion Iliescu
Independent
Elected President
Ion Iliescu
Independent
- Parliamentary election
- 27 September 1992
- All 143 seats in the Senate; All 341 seats in the Chamber of Deputies
| Party | Leader | Vote % | Seats | +/– |
Chamber of Deputies
| FDSN | Ion Iliescu | 27.75 | 117 | New |
| CDR | Emil Constantinescu | 20.05 | 82 | +31 |
| FSN | Petre Roman | 10.17 | 43 | −220 |
| PUNR | Gheorghe Funar | 7.73 | 30 | +21 |
| UDMR | Géza Domokos | 7.48 | 27 | −2 |
| PRM | Corneliu Vadim Tudor | 3.90 | 16 | New |
| PSM | Ilie Verdeț | 3.03 | 13 | New |
| Minority parties | | 2.00 | 13 | +2 |
Senate
| FDSN | Ion Iliescu | 28.31 | 49 | New |
| CDR | Emil Constantinescu | 20.19 | 34 | +22 |
| FSN | Petre Roman | 10.38 | 18 | −73 |
| PUNR | Gheorghe Funar | 8.13 | 14 | +12 |
| UDMR | Géza Domokos | 7.60 | 12 | 0 |
| PRM | Corneliu Vadim Tudor | 3.86 | 6 | New |
| PDAR | Victor Surdu | 3.29 | 5 | +5 |
| PSM | Ilie Verdeț | 3.18 | 5 | New |
This lists parties that won seats. See the complete results below.
The results for the Chamber of Deputies and for the Senate
| Prime Minister before | Prime Minister-designate |
|---|---|
| Theodor Stolojan; FSN | Nicolae Văcăroiu; FDSN |

General elections were held in Romania on 27 September 1992, with a second round of the presidential election on 11 October. They were the first held after the adoption of a permanent constitution via a referendum held the previous winter.

Incumbent President Ion Iliescu led the field in the first round, but was forced into a run off with Emil Constantinescu, candidate of the oppositional Romanian Democratic Convention (CDR). Constantinescu ran on a quicker transition to a market economy and purging remaining communist influence from the government. He benefited from a marked downturn in Iliescu's popularity tied to both high unemployment and concerns that Iliescu was wavering in his commitment to democracy.

Despite this, opinion polls ahead of the runoff suggested that Iliescu was favoured for a second full term. Not only was it believed that his 16-point first-round lead was too large for Constantinescu to overcome, but most of the minor candidates were expected to eventually offer their support to Iliescu in the second round. In the end, Iliescu was reelected with 61 percent of the vote. The 1992 Romanian presidential election was the second of its kind held in post-1989 Romania.

In the parliamentary election, Iliescu's Democratic National Salvation Front (FDSN), which had split off from the National Salvation Front (FSN) earlier in the year, emerged as the largest party in Parliament, winning 117 of the 341 seats in the Chamber of Deputies and 49 of the 143 seats in the Senate.

== Presidential candidates ==
=== Participating candidates ===
| Name | Lifespan | Public Administration Experience | Affiliation and endorsements | Alma mater and profession | Candidacy Announcement dates |
|---|---|---|---|---|---|
| Ion Iliescu | Born: 3 March 1930 (age 62); Oltenița, Călărași County | President of Romania (1989–election day); President of Water Surfaces Management Council (1979–1984); Member of the State Council (full member: 1979–1980, observative: 1974–1979); President of Iași County Council (1974–1979); Vice-President of Timiș County Council (1971–1974); Minister of Youth (1967–1971); Deputy (1957–1961, 1965–1973, 1975–1985); Former presidential election: 1990: 85.1% (winner) | Affiliation: FDSN | Energy Institute, Moscow State University (1954) fluid mechanics engineer, publishing house manager | |
| Emil Constantinescu | Born: 19 November 1939 (age 52); Tighina (today: de jure, Republic of Moldova; de facto Pridnestrovian Moldavian Republic) | Rector of University of Bucharest (1992–election day) | Affiliation: CDR | Faculty of Law, University of Bucharest (1960); Faculty of Geology, University of Bucharest (1966) geology professor | |
| Gheorghe Funar | Born: 29 September 1949 (age 42); Sânnicolau Mare, Timiș County | Mayor of Cluj-Napoca (1992–election day) | Affiliation: PUNR | Faculty of Economics and Business Management, Babeș-Bolyai University, Cluj-Napoca economist | |
| Caius Traian Dragomir | Born: 16 July 1939 (age 53); Slatina, Olt County | State Secretary for Public Information with the Government of Romania (1991–election day) | Affiliation: none Endorsed by: FSN | Carol Davila University of Medicine and Pharmacy, Bucharest (1963) physicist poet | |
| Mircea Druc | Born: 25 July 1941 (age 51); Pociumbăuți, Rîșcani District, Republic of Moldova | Prime Minister of the Moldavian SSR (1990–1991) | Affiliation: none Endorsed by: MER | Faculty of History and Philology, Moldova State University, Chișinău (1960); Faculty of Philology, Saint Petersburg State University (1964) administrative sciences professor | |
| Ioan Mânzatu | Born: 11 August 1932 (age 60); Bobâlna, Cluj County | Vice-President of Romania (1990) | Affiliation: Republican Party | Faculty of Physics, Babeș-Bolyai University physics professor | |

=== Withdrawn candidates ===
| Name | Lifespan | Public Administration Experience | Affiliation and endorsements | Alma mater and profession | Candidacy Announcement dates |
|---|---|---|---|---|---|
| Ioan Lup | | | Affiliation: PNȚCD | | Intention: 25 June 1992; Withdrawal: 25 June 1992; Endorsed Ion Rațiu: 25 June 1992; Endorsed Emil Constantinescu: 27 June 1992 |
| Nicu Stăncescu | | | Affiliation: Party of Democratic Unity | | Withdrawal: 27 June 1992; Endorsed Emil Constantinescu: 27 June 1992 |
| Sergiu Cunescu | Born: 16 March 1923 (age 69), Bucharest; Died: 16 March 2005 | | Affiliation: PSDR | Faculty of Electromagnetics, Politehnica University of Bucharest combustion engine engineer | Withdrawal: 27 June 1992; Endorsed Emil Constantinescu: 27 June 1992 |
| Nicolae Manolescu | Born: 27 November 1939 (age 52); Râmnicu Vâlcea, Vâlcea County | | Affiliation: Civic Alliance Party | Faculty of Philology, University of Bucharest (1962) writer, book critic | Withdrawal: 27 June 1992; Endorsed Emil Constantinescu: 27 June 1992 |
| Ion Rațiu | Born: 6 June 1917 (age 75), Turda, Cluj County; Died: 17 January 2000, London | Chancellor at Romanian Embassy in UK (1940) | Affiliation: PNȚCD | Faculty of Law, Babeș-Bolyai University, Cluj-Napoca (1938); Faculty of Economics, University of Cambridge (1943) lawyer, economist, journalist | Intention: 25 June 1992; Withdrawal: 27 June 1992; Endorsed Emil Constantinescu: 27 June 1992 |

== Results ==
=== President ===
Presidential election - First round

Presidential election - Second round

Ion Iliescu's first round vote share by county

Emil Constantinescu's first round vote share by county

Gheorghe Funar's first round vote share by county

Gheorghe Funar and Ioan Mânzatu openly endorsed Ion Iliescu in the second round.

| Candidate | Party | First round | | Second round | |
| Candidate | Party | Votes | % | Votes | % |
|---|---|---|---|---|---|
| Ion Iliescu | Democratic National Salvation Front | 5,633,465 | 47.34 | 7,393,429 | 61.43 |
| Emil Constantinescu | Romanian Democratic Convention | 3,717,006 | 31.24 | 4,641,207 | 38.57 |
| Gheorghe Funar | Romanian National Unity Party | 1,294,388 | 10.88 | | |
| Caius-Traian Dragomir | National Salvation Front | 564,655 | 4.75 | | |
| Ioan Mânzatu | Republican Party | 362,485 | 3.05 | | |
| Mircea Druc | Independent | 326,866 | 2.75 | | |
| Total | | 11,898,865 | 100.00 | 12,034,636 | 100.00 |
| Valid votes | | 11,898,865 | 95.22 | 12,034,636 | 99.02 |
| Invalid/blank votes | | 597,565 | 4.78 | 119,174 | 0.98 |
| Total votes | | 12,496,430 | 100.00 | 12,153,810 | 100.00 |
| Registered voters/turnout | | 16,380,663 | 76.29 | 16,597,508 | 73.23 |
Source: Nohlen & Stöver

Vote share
Second round
| Iliescu | 61.43% |
| Constantinescu | 38.57% |
First round
| Iliescu | 47.34% |
| Constantinescu | 31.24% |
| Funar | 10.88% |
| Dragomir | 4.75% |
| Mânzatu | 3.05% |
| Druc | 2.75% |

=== Parliament ===
==== Senate ====
| Party | Votes | % | Seats | +/– |
|---|---|---|---|---|
| Democratic National Salvation Front | 3,091,221 | 28.31 | 49 | New |
| Romanian Democratic Convention (Note: Of the 34 seats won by the CDR, the PNȚCD won 21, the PAC 7, the PNL-CD 4, the PNL-AT 1, and the PSDR 1.) | 2,204,025 | 20.19 | 34 | +22 |
| National Salvation Front | 1,133,355 | 10.38 | 18 | –73 |
| Romanian National Unity Party | 887,597 | 8.13 | 14 | +12 |
| Democratic Alliance of Hungarians in Romania | 830,193 | 7.60 | 12 | 0 |
| Greater Romania Party | 421,042 | 3.86 | 6 | New |
| Democratic Agrarian Party of Romania | 359,042 | 3.29 | 5 | +5 |
| Socialist Party of Labour | 347,658 | 3.18 | 5 | New |
| National Liberal Party | 290,866 | 2.66 | 0 | –10 |
| Ecological Movement of Romania | 231,401 | 2.12 | 0 | –1 |
| Republican Party | 205,988 | 1.89 | 0 | – |
| National Democratic Solidarity | 97,212 | 0.89 | 0 | New |
| Romanian Socialist Democratic Party | 60,708 | 0.56 | 0 | – |
| New Liberal Party | 57,213 | 0.52 | 0 | New |
| Party of Social Democratic Unity | 51,987 | 0.48 | 0 | New |
| Liberal Union–Brătianu | 48,222 | 0.44 | 0 | – |
| National Peasant Party | 43,360 | 0.40 | 0 | New |
| Liberal Monarchist Party of Romania | 42,561 | 0.39 | 0 | New |
| Party of the Roma | 40,946 | 0.38 | 0 | New |
| Convention of Social Solidarity | 34,491 | 0.32 | 0 | New |
| Democratic Cooperatist Party | 30,938 | 0.28 | 0 | New |
| Party for the Honouring of the Heroes of the Revolution and National Salvation | 27,513 | 0.25 | 0 | – |
| Republican Party of Romanian Unity | 24,009 | 0.22 | 0 | New |
| Traditional Social Democratic Party | 23,068 | 0.21 | 0 | New |
| National Party of Free Producers from Romania | 20,442 | 0.19 | 0 | New |
| General Union of Roma in Romania | 19,245 | 0.18 | 0 | New |
| Free Democratic Union of the Roma of Romania | 18,528 | 0.17 | 0 | – |
| Christian Republican Party | 17,332 | 0.16 | 0 | – |
| Democratic Romanian Front 16–20.XII.1989 Timișoara | 16,665 | 0.15 | 0 | New |
| Romanian Humanist Party | 16,484 | 0.15 | 0 | New |
| Movement for Romania | 13,922 | 0.13 | 0 | New |
| Free Republican Party | 13,401 | 0.12 | 0 | New |
| National Democratic Christian Party | 13,356 | 0.12 | 0 | New |
| Independent National Peasant Christian Democratic Party | 12,587 | 0.12 | 0 | New |
| Romanian Labour Party | 12,344 | 0.11 | 0 | New |
| Romanian Renaissance and Independence Party | 12,266 | 0.11 | 0 | New |
| Party of the Gypsies of Romania | 10,811 | 0.10 | 0 | – |
| Party of Free Change | 8,720 | 0.08 | 0 | – |
| Antitotalitarian Party 'Down the Nomenklatura' | 8,446 | 0.08 | 0 | New |
| Independent Social Democratic Party | 8,146 | 0.07 | 0 | New |
| National League of Expropriated of Romania | 6,210 | 0.06 | 0 | New |
| Alliance of National Dignity | 5,661 | 0.05 | 0 | New |
| United Democratic Convention | 4,968 | 0.05 | 0 | New |
| Christian Democratic Union | 4,738 | 0.04 | 0 | – |
| Party Democratic Future of the Motherland | 4,175 | 0.04 | 0 | – |
| Romanian Party for the New Society | 3,523 | 0.03 | 0 | – |
| Party of Labour | 3,256 | 0.03 | 0 | – |
| Party of Social Justice (New Democracy) of the North West of Romania | 3,247 | 0.03 | 0 | – |
| Party of Social Justice | 3,050 | 0.03 | 0 | – |
| Social Democratic Party "Titel Petrescu | 2,993 | 0.03 | 0 | New |
| Democratic Party of Labour | 2,933 | 0.03 | 0 | – |
| Humanitarian Party of Peace | 2,213 | 0.02 | 0 | New |
| Christian Democratic Party of the Revolution | 1,743 | 0.02 | 0 | New |
| Party of the Democratic Union of Moldova | 1,726 | 0.02 | 0 | New |
| Forum of Democracy and National Unity of Romania | 1,413 | 0.01 | 0 | – |
| Romanian Popular Democratic Realistic Revolutionary Party | 1,410 | 0.01 | 0 | New |
| Party of Heroes Fallen for the Freedom of the Alive Heroes, Affected by the Barbarian Bullets | 913 | 0.01 | 0 | New |
| Party of Small Owners and Free Initiative of Romania | 805 | 0.01 | 0 | New |
| Party of the National Right | 648 | 0.01 | 0 | New |
| Independent Democratic Party | 609 | 0.01 | 0 | New |
| Democratic Forum of Germans | 558 | 0.01 | 0 | – |
| Party Movement 'Motherland's Shield' | 493 | 0.00 | 0 | New |
| National Romanian Party | 397 | 0.00 | 0 | – |
| Democratic Alliance of the Roma Party | 258 | 0.00 | 0 | New |
| Conservative Humanistic Party | 138 | 0.00 | 0 | New |
| Independents | 52,327 | 0.48 | 0 | –1 |
| Total | 10,917,716 | 100.00 | 143 | +24 |
| Valid votes | 10,917,716 | 87.53 | | |
| Invalid/blank votes | 1,554,725 | 12.47 | | |
| Total votes | 12,472,441 | 100.00 | | |
| Registered voters/turnout | 16,380,663 | 76.14 | | |
Source: AEP

==== Chamber of Deputies ====
| Party | Votes | % | Seats | +/– |
|---|---|---|---|---|
| Democratic National Salvation Front | 3,003,573 | 27.75 | 117 | New |
| Romanian Democratic Convention (Note: Of the 82 seats won by the CDR, the PNȚCD won 41, the PAC 13, the PNL-AT 11, the PSDR 10, the PER 4, and the PNL-CD 3.) | 2,170,289 | 20.05 | 82 | +60 |
| National Salvation Front | 1,101,425 | 10.17 | 43 | –220 |
| Romanian National Unity Party | 836,547 | 7.73 | 30 | +21 |
| Democratic Alliance of Hungarians in Romania | 809,653 | 7.48 | 27 | –2 |
| Greater Romania Party | 422,136 | 3.90 | 16 | New |
| Socialist Party of Labour | 328,283 | 3.03 | 13 | New |
| Democratic Agrarian Party of Romania | 322,990 | 2.98 | 0 | –9 |
| National Liberal Party | 284,678 | 2.63 | 0 | –29 |
| Ecological Movement of Romania | 243,740 | 2.25 | 0 | –8 |
| Republican Party | 177,056 | 1.64 | 0 | – |
| Romanian Socialist Democratic Party | 94,154 | 0.87 | 0 | –5 |
| National-Democratic Solidarity | 78,615 | 0.73 | 0 | New |
| New Liberal Party | 63,098 | 0.58 | 0 | New |
| Liberal Union–Brătianu | 54,673 | 0.51 | 0 | –1 |
| Party of the Roma | 52,170 | 0.48 | 1 | New |
| Party of Social-Democratic Unity | 50,114 | 0.46 | 0 | New |
| National Peasant Party | 48,031 | 0.44 | 0 | New |
| Liberal Monarchist Party of Romania | 38,542 | 0.36 | 0 | New |
| Convention of Social Solidarity | 35,286 | 0.33 | 0 | New |
| Democratic Forum of Germans | 34,471 | 0.32 | 1 | 0 |
| Democratic Cooperatist Party | 32,446 | 0.30 | 0 | New |
| Free Democratic Union of the Roma of Romania | 31,060 | 0.29 | 0 | 0 |
| National Party of Free Producers from Romania | 29,688 | 0.27 | 0 | New |
| Party for the Honouring of the Heroes of the Revolution and National Salvation | 25,781 | 0.24 | 0 | 0 |
| Republican Party of Romanians Unity | 23,447 | 0.22 | 0 | New |
| Romanian Humanist Party | 22,908 | 0.21 | 0 | New |
| Traditional Social Democratic Party | 21,800 | 0.20 | 0 | New |
| General Union of Roma in Romania | 21,734 | 0.20 | 0 | New |
| Christian Republican Party | 18,633 | 0.17 | 0 | 0 |
| Romanian Labour Party | 16,439 | 0.15 | 0 | New |
| Community of the Lipovan Russians | 14,861 | 0.14 | 1 | 0 |
| Independent National Peasant Christian Democratic Party | 14,828 | 0.14 | 0 | New |
| Democratic Romanian Front 16–20.XII.1989 Timișoara | 14,779 | 0.14 | 0 | New |
| Romanian Renaissance and Independence Party | 13,573 | 0.13 | 0 | New |
| Free Republican Party | 13,353 | 0.12 | 0 | New |
| Movement for Romania | 12,708 | 0.12 | 0 | New |
| Party of Free Change | 12,360 | 0.11 | 0 | –1 |
| Independent Social Democratic Party | 11,497 | 0.11 | 0 | New |
| National Democratic Christian Party | 11,472 | 0.11 | 0 | New |
| Party of the Gypsies of Romania | 9,679 | 0.09 | 0 | 0 |
| Hellenic Union of Romania | 8,913 | 0.08 | 1 | 0 |
| United Democratic Convention | 8,863 | 0.08 | 0 | New |
| Democratic Union of Turkish-Muslim Tatars | 7,688 | 0.07 | 1 | 0 |
| Union of the Ukrainians of Romania | 7,641 | 0.07 | 1 | 0 |
| Social Democratic Party "Constantin Titel Petrescu | 7,171 | 0.07 | 0 | New |
| Union of Armenians of Romania | 7,044 | 0.07 | 1 | 0 |
| National League of Expropriated of Romania | 6,886 | 0.06 | 0 | New |
| Alliance of National Dignity | 6,064 | 0.06 | 0 | New |
| Party of the National Right | 5,622 | 0.05 | 0 | New |
| Christian Democratic Union | 5,605 | 0.05 | 0 | 0 |
| Democratic Union of Serbs and Carasovenians of Romania | 5,306 | 0.05 | 1 | 0 |
| Romanian Party for the New Society | 5,250 | 0.05 | 0 | 0 |
| Independent Democratic Party | 5,140 | 0.05 | 0 | New |
| Democratic Union of Slovaks and Czechs of Romania | 4,662 | 0.04 | 1 | 0 |
| Antitotalitarian Party 'Down with the Nomenklatura' | 4,623 | 0.04 | 0 | New |
| Party Democratic Future of the Motherland | 4,322 | 0.04 | 0 | 0 |
| Italian Community of Romania | 4,111 | 0.04 | 1 | New |
| Democratic Party of Labour | 3,888 | 0.04 | 0 | –1 |
| Forum of Democracy and National Unity of Romania | 3,180 | 0.03 | 0 | 0 |
| Party of Social Justice (New Democracy) of the North West of Romania | 3,063 | 0.03 | 0 | 0 |
| Union of Poles of Romania | 2,987 | 0.03 | 1 | 0 |
| Party 'Will of the People' | 2,704 | 0.02 | 0 | New |
| Party of Justice and Social Democracy of Romania | 2,687 | 0.02 | 0 | New |
| Party of Labour | 2,623 | 0.02 | 0 | 0 |
| Turkish Muslim Democratic Union of Romania | 2,569 | 0.02 | 1 | New |
| Party of Social Justice | 2,525 | 0.02 | 0 | 0 |
| Party of the Democratic Union of Moldova | 2,358 | 0.02 | 0 | New |
| National Romanian Party | 2,201 | 0.02 | 0 | 0 |
| Bulgarian Union of Banat–Romania | 1,886 | 0.02 | 1 | 0 |
| National Movement 'Motherland's Shield' Party | 1,738 | 0.02 | 0 | New |
| Movement for European Integration | 1,367 | 0.01 | 0 | New |
| Humanitarian Party of Peace | 1,173 | 0.01 | 0 | New |
| Romanian Popular Democratic Realistic Revolutionary Party | 1,126 | 0.01 | 0 | New |
| Christian Democratic Party of the Revolution | 1,075 | 0.01 | 0 | New |
| Party of Small Owners and Free Initiative of Romania | 651 | 0.01 | 0 | New |
| Union of Croats of Romania | 217 | 0.00 | 0 | New |
| Conservative Humanistic Party | 101 | 0.00 | 0 | New |
| 'Republican Tribune' Party | 48 | 0.00 | 0 | New |
| Independents | 57,855 | 0.53 | 0 | –1 |
| Total | 10,825,503 | 100.00 | 341 | –54 |
| Valid votes | 10,825,503 | 86.80 | | |
| Invalid/blank votes | 1,645,820 | 13.20 | | |
| Total votes | 12,471,323 | 100.00 | | |
| Registered voters/turnout | 16,380,663 | 76.13 | | |
Source: AEP
