= Democratic Union of the Roma of Romania =

Romani political party in Romania

The Democratic Union of the Roma of Romania (Romanian: Uniunea Democrata a Romilor din Romania, UDRR) was an ethnic minority political party in Romania representing the Romani community.

== History ==
The UDRR contested the 1990 general elections, and despite receiving only 0.21% of the vote, it won a single seat in the Chamber of Deputies. In the Senate elections it received 0.14% of the vote, failing to win a seat.

== Electoral history ==
Election	Chamber of Deputies			Senate		
Election	Votes	%	Seats	Votes	%	Seats
1990	29,162	0.21	1	19,847	0.14	0
