= 1996 Romanian general election =

- Presidential election
- 3 November 1996 (first round); 17 November 1996 (second round)
- Turnout: 76.01% (first round) ▼0.28pp 75.90% (second round) ▲2.67pp
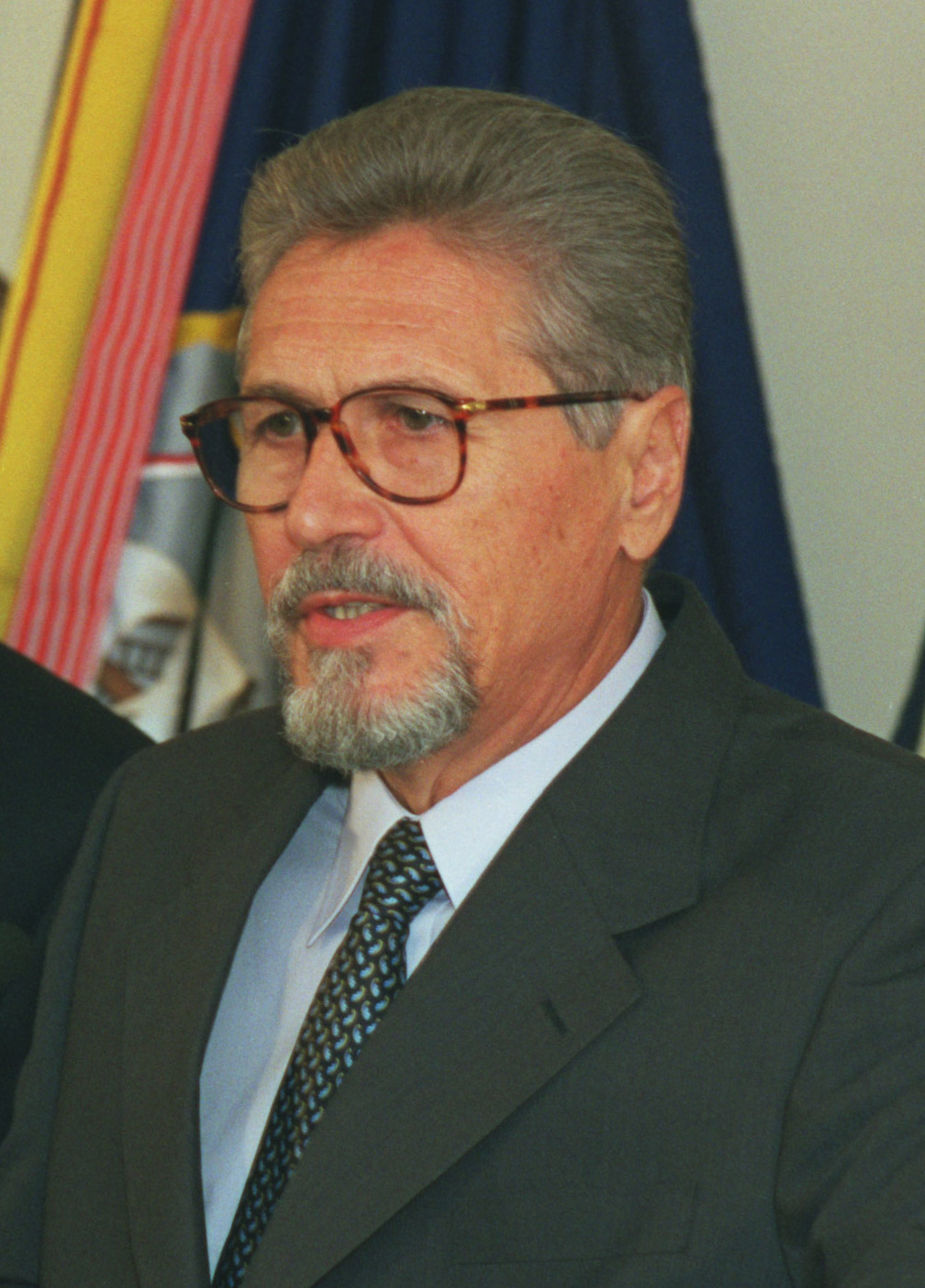

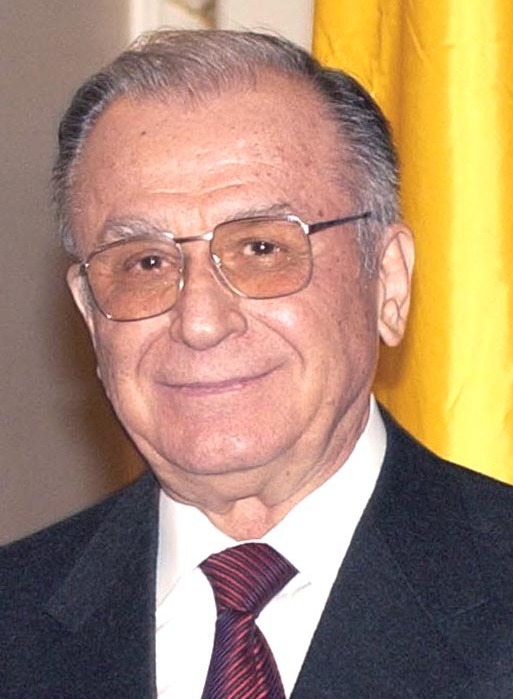
Nominee	Emil Constantinescu	Ion Iliescu
Party	CDR	Independent (Note: The President of Romania traditionally resigns from party membership after taking office. Although Iliescu was officially an independent, his campaign was endorsed and funded by PDSR.)
Popular vote	7,057,906	5,914,579
Percentage	54.41%	45.59%
- Constantinescu: 50–60% 60–70% 70–80% 80–90% >90% Iliescu: 50–60% 60–70%
President before election
Ion Iliescu
Independent
Elected President
Emil Constantinescu
CDR
- Parliamentary election
- 3 November 1996
- All 143 seats in the Senate; All 343 seats in the Chamber of Deputies
Party	Leader	Vote %	Seats	+/–
Chamber of Deputies
CDR	Emil Constantinescu	30.17	122	+40
PDSR	Ion Iliescu	21.52	91	−26
USD	Petre Roman	12.93	53	+10
UDMR	Béla Markó	6.64	25	−2
PRM	Corneliu Vadim Tudor	4.46	19	+3
PUNR	Gheorghe Funar	4.36	18	−12
Minority parties		1.67	15	+2
Senate
CDR	Emil Constantinescu	30.70	53	+19
PDSR	Ion Iliescu	23.08	41	−8
USD	Petre Roman	13.16	23	+5
UDMR	Béla Markó	6.82	11	−1
PRM	Corneliu Vadim Tudor	4.54	8	+2
PUNR	Gheorghe Funar	4.22	7	−7
This lists parties that won seats. See the complete results below.
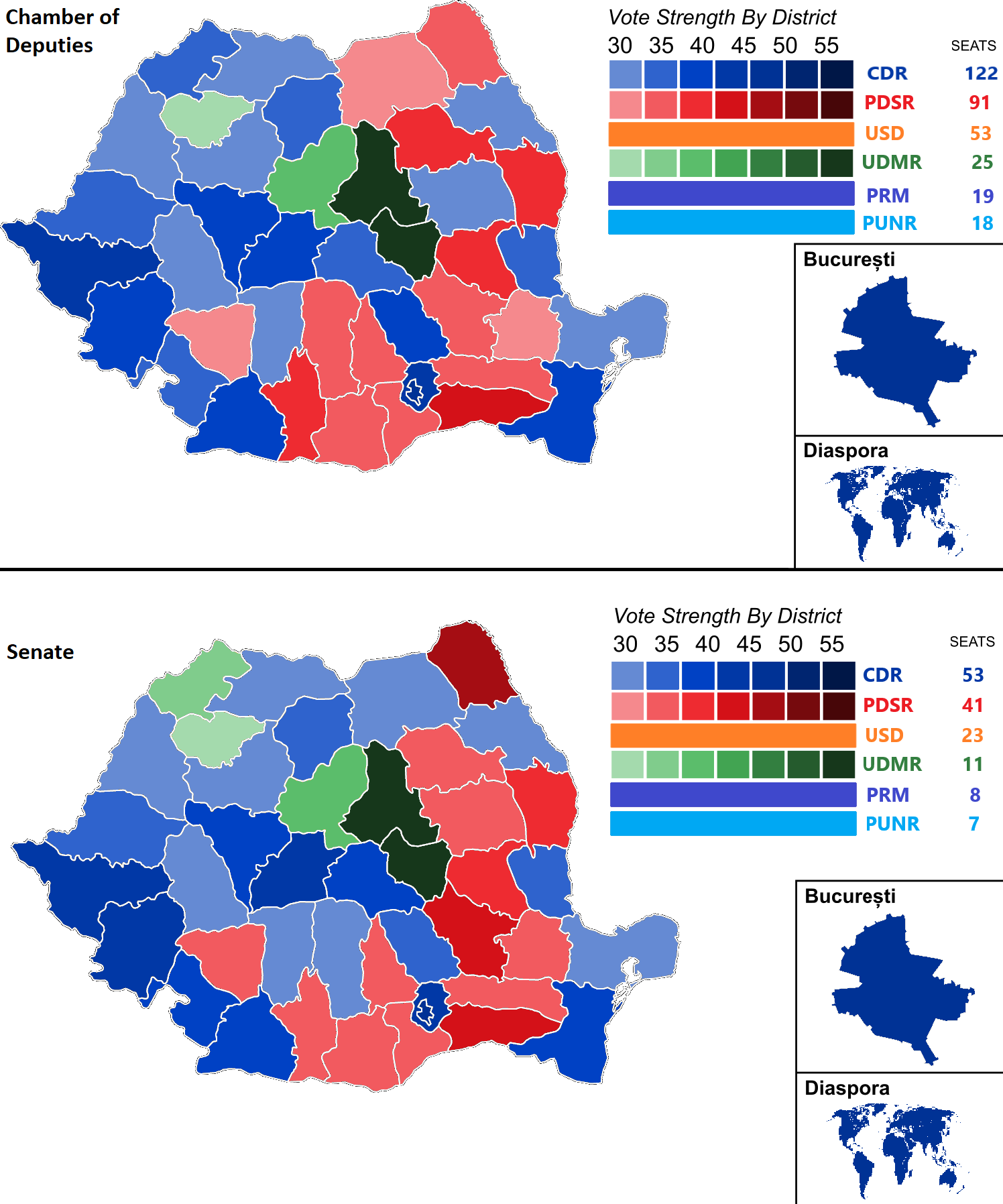
Results for the Chamber of Deputies and Senate
Prime Minister before	Prime Minister-designate
Nicolae Văcăroiu; PDSR	Victor Ciorbea; PNȚCD (CDR)

General elections were held in Romania on 3 November 1996, with a second round of the presidential election on 17 November.

Opinion polls prior to the elections suggested incumbent President Ion Iliescu of the Social Democracy Party of Romania (PDSR, formerly the Democratic National Salvation Front) would win a third term, though it was believed a large field of candidates would push him into a runoff. Iliescu received the most votes in the first round, just ahead of his 1992 run-off opponent, Emil Constantinescu of the Romanian Democratic Convention (CDR).

In the second round, Constantinescu defeated Iliescu with 54 percent of the vote. Iliescu conceded defeat soon after the polls closed. Constantinescu took office on 29 November, marking the first peaceful transfer of power since the fall of communism. To date, it is the only time since the introduction of direct presidential elections that an incumbent Romanian president has been defeated when running for re-election. The 1996 Romanian presidential election was the third of its kind held in post-1989 Romania.

The CDR, a broad coalition of parties opposing the governing centre-left PDSR, also emerged as the largest bloc in Parliament, winning 122 of the 343 seats in the Chamber of Deputies and 53 of the 143 seats in the Senate.

== Presidential candidates ==
Name	Lifespan	Public administration experience	Affiliation and endorsements	Alma mater and profession	Candidacy Announcement dates
Emil Constantinescu	Born: 19 November 1939 (age 56); Tighina (de jure, Republic of Moldova; de facto Pridnestrovian Moldavian Republic)	Rector of University of Bucharest (1992–election day); Former presidential election: 1992: 31.1% (2nd place, 1st round), 38.6% (2nd place, 2nd round)	Affiliation: CDR	Faculty of Law, University of Bucharest (1960); Faculty of Geology, University of Bucharest (1966) geology professor	
Ion Iliescu	Born: 3 March 1930 (age 66); Oltenița, Călărași County; Died 5 August 2025, Bucharest	President of Romania (1989–election day); President of Water Surfaces Management Council (1979–1984); Member of the State Council (full member: 1979–1980, observative: 1974–1979); President of Iași County Council (1974–1979); Vice-President of Timiș County Council (1971–1974); Minister of Youth (1967–1971); Deputy (1957–1961, 1965–1973, 1975–1985); Former presidential elections: 1992: 47.2% (1st place, 1st round), 61.4% (winner, 2nd round); 1990: 85.1% (winner)	Affiliation: PDSR	Energy Institute, Moscow State University (1954) fluid mechanics engineer, publishing house manager	
Petre Roman	Born: 22 July 1946 (age 50); Bucharest	Deputy (1990–election day); Prime Minister of Romania (1989–1991)	Affiliation: Social Democratic Union; Alliance members: PD and PSDR	Faculty of Energy, Politehnica University of Bucharest (1968) hydroelectric powerplant engineer	
György Frunda	Born: 22 July 1951 (age 45); Târgu Mureș, Mureș County	Senator (1992–election day)	Affiliation: UDMR	Faculty of Law, Babeş-Bolyai University, Cluj-Napoca (1974) lawyer	
Corneliu Vadim Tudor	Born: 28 November 1949 (age 46); Bucharest; Died 14 September 2015, Bucharest	Senator (1992–election day)	Affiliation: PRM	Faculty of Philosophy, University of Bucharest (1971) journalist, writer	
Gheorghe Funar	Born: 29 September 1949 (age 47); Sânnicolau Mare, Timiș County	Mayor of Cluj-Napoca (1992–election day); Former presidential election: 1992: 10.8% (3rd place, 1st round)	Affiliation: PUNR	Faculty of Economics and Business Management, Babeș-Bolyai University, Cluj-Napoca (unknown year) economist	
Tudor Mohora	Born: 6 October 1950 (age 46); Bogdana, Teleorman County	Deputy (1992–election day)	Affiliation: Socialist Party	Faculty of Chemistry, University of Bucharest (1974) chemistry teacher	
Nicolae Manolescu	Born: 27 November 1939 (age 56); Râmnicu Vâlcea, Vâlcea County; Died 23 March 2024, Bucharest	Senator (1992–election day)	Affiliation: National Liberal Alliance	Faculty of Philology, University of Bucharest (1962) writer, literary critic	
Adrian Păunescu	Born: 20 July 1943 (age 53); Copăceni, Sîngerei District, Republic of Moldova; Died 5 November 2010, Bucharest	Senator (1992–election day)	Affiliation: PSM	Faculty of Philology, University of Bucharest (1968) poet	
Ioan Pop de Popa	Born: 6 October 1927 (age 69); Oradea, Bihor County; Died 30 April 2021, Oradea	Deputy (1965–1973)	Affiliation: Center National Union	Faculty of Medicine, Babeş-Bolyai University, Cluj-Napoca (1952) cardiologist	
George Muntean	Born: 17 November 1932 (age 63); Bilca, Suceava County; Died 1 June 2004, Bucharest		Affiliation: Pensioners Party of Romania	Faculty of Letters, University of Bucharest (1959) historian, journalist	
Radu Câmpeanu	Born: 28 February 1922 (age 74), Bucharest; Died 19 October 2016, Bucharest	Former presidential election: 1990: 10.6% (2nd place)	Affiliation: National Liberal-Ecologist Alliance	Faculty of Law, University of Bucharest (1945); Faculty of Economic Sciences, University of Bucharest (1947) economist	
Nuțu Anghelina	Born: 16 April 1956 (age 40); Buhuși, Bacău County; Died4 August 2021, Bucharest		Affiliation: none	Faculty of Orthodox Theology, unknown university (1986) orthodox priest	
Constantin Mudava	Born: 8 April 1935 (age 61); Ghirdoveni, Dâmbovița County; Died 1 November 2018, Târgoviște		Affiliation: none	unknown education holistic healer	
Constantin Niculescu	Born: 18 May 1940 (age 56); Râmnicu Vâlcea, Vâlcea County; Died 17 February 2025, Bucharest	President of Romanian Automobile Club (1994–election day)		Affiliation: National Party of Motorists	Faculty of Mechanical Engineering, Transilvania University of Brașov (1960) mechanical engineer
Nicolae Militaru	Born: 10 November 1925 (age 70); Bălești, Gorj County; Died 27 December 1996, Bucharest	Minister of Defence (1989–1990); Deputy Minister for Industrial Constructions (1978–1984); Deputy (1969–1975)	Affiliation: none	Frunze Military Academy, Moscow (unknown year) military	

== Results ==
=== President ===
Presidential election – First round

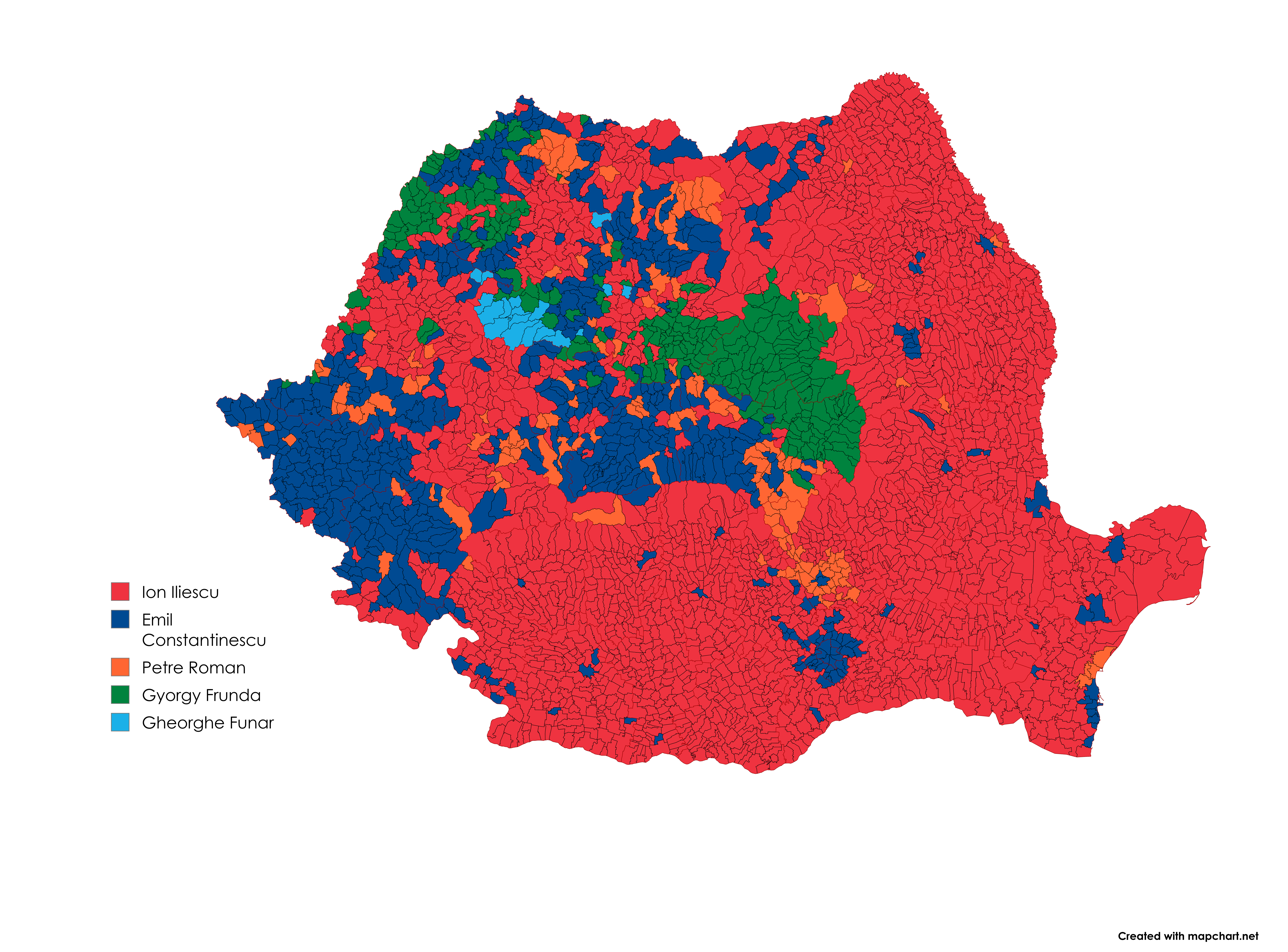
Presidential election – First round

Presidential election – Second round

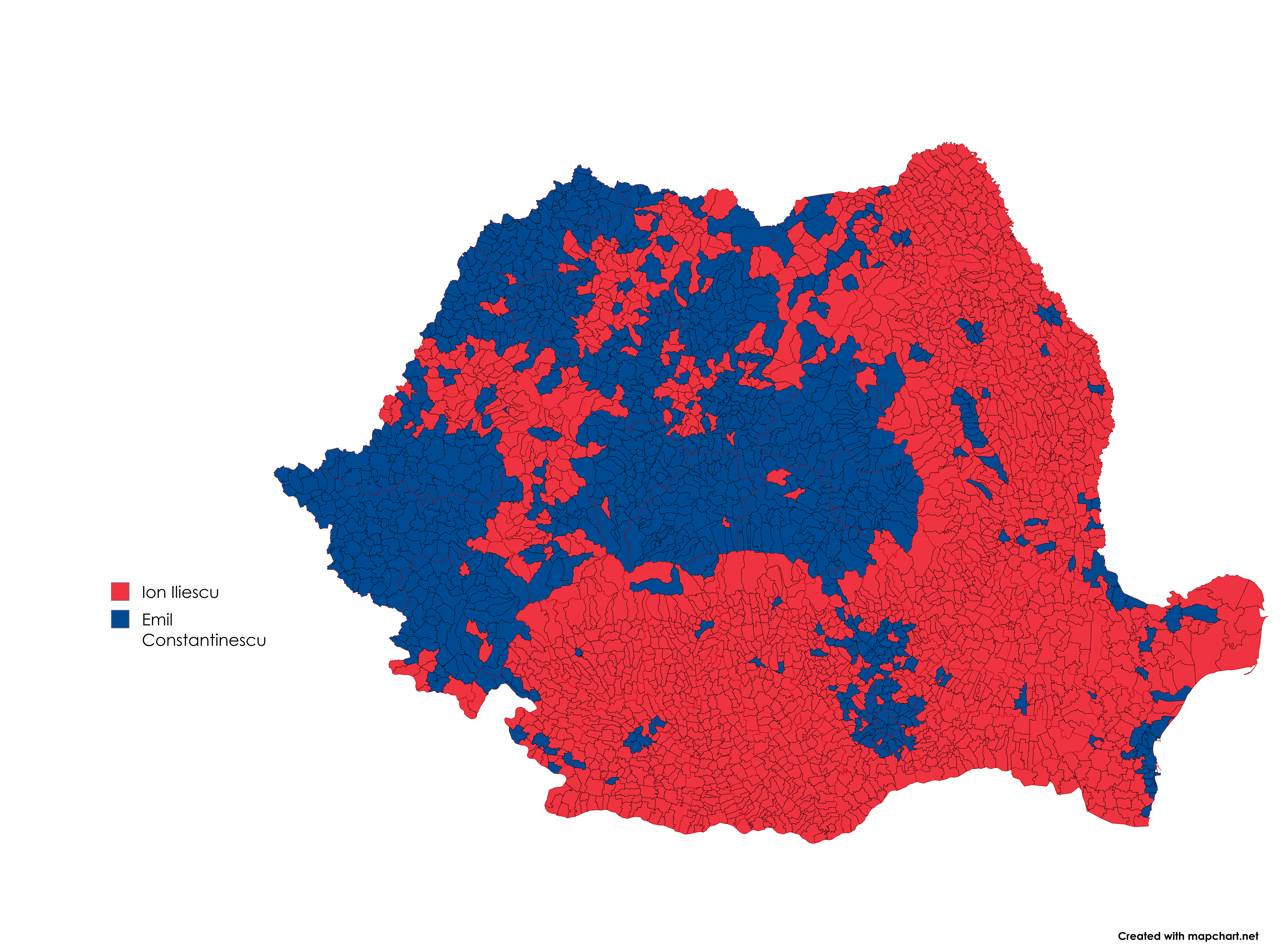
Presidential election – Second round

Petre Roman, György Frunda, Gheorghe Funar, and Nicolae Manolescu openly endorsed Constantinescu in the second round. Corneliu Vadim Tudor, Tudor Mohora, and Adrian Păunescu openly endorsed Iliescu.

Candidate	Party	First round		Second round	
Candidate	Party	Votes	%	Votes	%
Emil Constantinescu	Romanian Democratic Convention	3,569,941	28.21	7,057,906	54.41
Ion Iliescu	Party of Social Democracy in Romania	4,081,093	32.25	5,914,579	45.59
Petre Roman	Democratic Party	2,598,545	20.54		
György Frunda	Democratic Alliance of Hungarians in Romania	761,411	6.02		
Corneliu Vadim Tudor	Greater Romania Party	597,508	4.72		
Gheorghe Funar	Romanian National Unity Party	407,828	3.22		
Tudor Mohora	Socialist Party	160,387	1.27		
Nicolae Manolescu	National Liberal Alliance	90,122	0.71		
Adrian Păunescu	Socialist Party of Labour	87,163	0.69		
Ion Pop de Popa	Humanist Party	59,752	0.47		
George Muntean	Independent	54,218	0.43		
Radu Câmpeanu	National Liberal Ecologist Alliance	43,780	0.35		
Nuțu Anghelina	Independent	43,319	0.34		
Constantin Mudava	Independent	39,477	0.31		
Constantin Niculescu	National Party of Drivers	30,045	0.24		
Nicolae Militaru	Independent	28,318	0.22		
Total		12,652,907	100.00	12,972,485	100.00
Valid votes		12,652,907	96.67	12,972,485	99.19
Invalid/blank votes		435,481	3.33	106,398	0.81
Total votes		13,088,388	100.00	13,078,883	100.00
Registered voters/turnout		17,218,654	76.01	17,230,654	75.90
Source: Nohlen & Stöver

Vote share
Second round
Constantinescu	54.41%
Iliescu	45.59%
First round
Iliescu	32.25%
Constantinescu	28.21%
Roman	20.54%
Frunda	6.02%
Tudor	4.72%
Funar	3.22%
Muhora	1.27%
Others	3.76%

Ion Iliescu

Emil Constantinescu

Petre Roman

György Frunda

Corneliu Vadim Tudor

=== Parliament ===
==== Senate ====
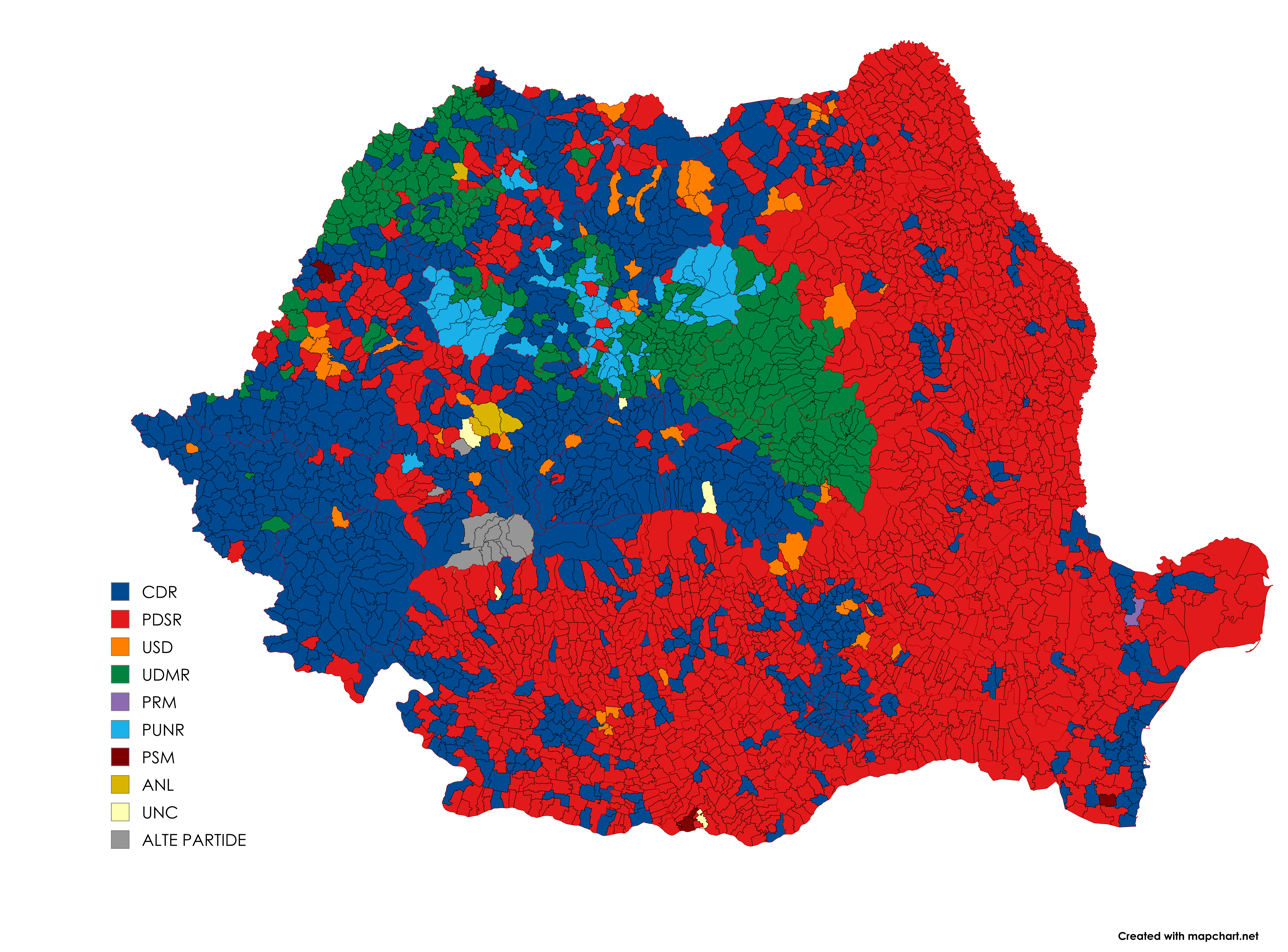
Results of the 1996 Romanian legislative election, showing the number of votes for the party that won a plurality in each locality. Results for the Senate

Party	Votes	%	Seats	+/–
Romanian Democratic Convention	3,772,084	30.70	53	19
Party of Social Democracy in Romania	2,836,011	23.08	41	−8
Social Democratic Union (PD–PSDR)	1,617,384	13.16	23	+5
Democratic Alliance of Hungarians in Romania	837,760	6.82	11	−1
Greater Romania Party	558,026	4.54	8	+2
Romanian National Unity Party	518,962	4.22	7	−7
Socialist Party	277,104	2.26	0	New
Socialist Party of Labour	265,659	2.16	0	−5
National Liberal Alliance	236,132	1.92	0	New
Party of Pensioners of Romania	178,654	1.45	0	New
Romanian Socialist Party of Workers	163,582	1.33	0	New
National Union of the Centre (PDAR–MER–PUR)	118,859	0.97	0	–5
National Peasant Party	86,746	0.71	0	0
National Liberal Ecologist Alliance (PNL–C–PAV-E)	86,359	0.70	0	New
Party of the Roma	80,622	0.66	0	0
Roma Union	72,648	0.59	0	New
National Christian Democratic Party	65,932	0.54	0	New
National Party of the Motorists	57,644	0.47	0	New
Romanian Working Party	49,325	0.40	0	New
Free Republican Party	36,877	0.30	0	0
New Romania Party	35,027	0.29	0	New
Ecological Convention Party of Romania	33,888	0.28	0	New
Party of Reunification–Dacian-Latin Option	28,622	0.23	0	New
Christian Democratic Union	23,656	0.19	0	0
Party for the Motherland	21,295	0.17	0	New
Party of Former Non-Communists and Political Prisoners	20,989	0.17	0	New
Party of Social Protection of Romania	20,972	0.17	0	New
Republican Party	20,273	0.16	0	0
Romanian Socialist Party	18,834	0.15	0	New
Hungarian Free Democratic Party of Romania	12,103	0.10	0	New
Party of Private Entrepreneurs–Social Democratic Party	11,627	0.09	0	New
Party of the Revival of Romania 'Ion Mihalache'	9,111	0.07	0	New
Community of the Roma Ethnicity in Romania	6,073	0.05	0	New
Liberal Christian Party	5,933	0.05	0	New
Party of the Romanian Revolution	2,938	0.02	0	New
Union of the Roma, Constanța County	763	0.01	0	New
Party of Democratic Solidarity	299	0.00	0	New
Independents	98,898	0.80	0	0
Total	12,287,671	100.00	143	0
Valid votes	12,287,671	93.88		
Invalid/blank votes	800,717	6.12		
Total votes	13,088,388	100.00		
Registered voters/turnout	17,218,654	76.01		
Source: Nohlen & Stöver, University of Essex

Romanian Democratic Convention (CDR) members included the PNȚCD, PNL, PNL–CD (1 senator), PAR (3 senators), PER (1 senator), Ecologist Federation of Romania (FER) (1 senator).

==== Chamber of Deputies ====
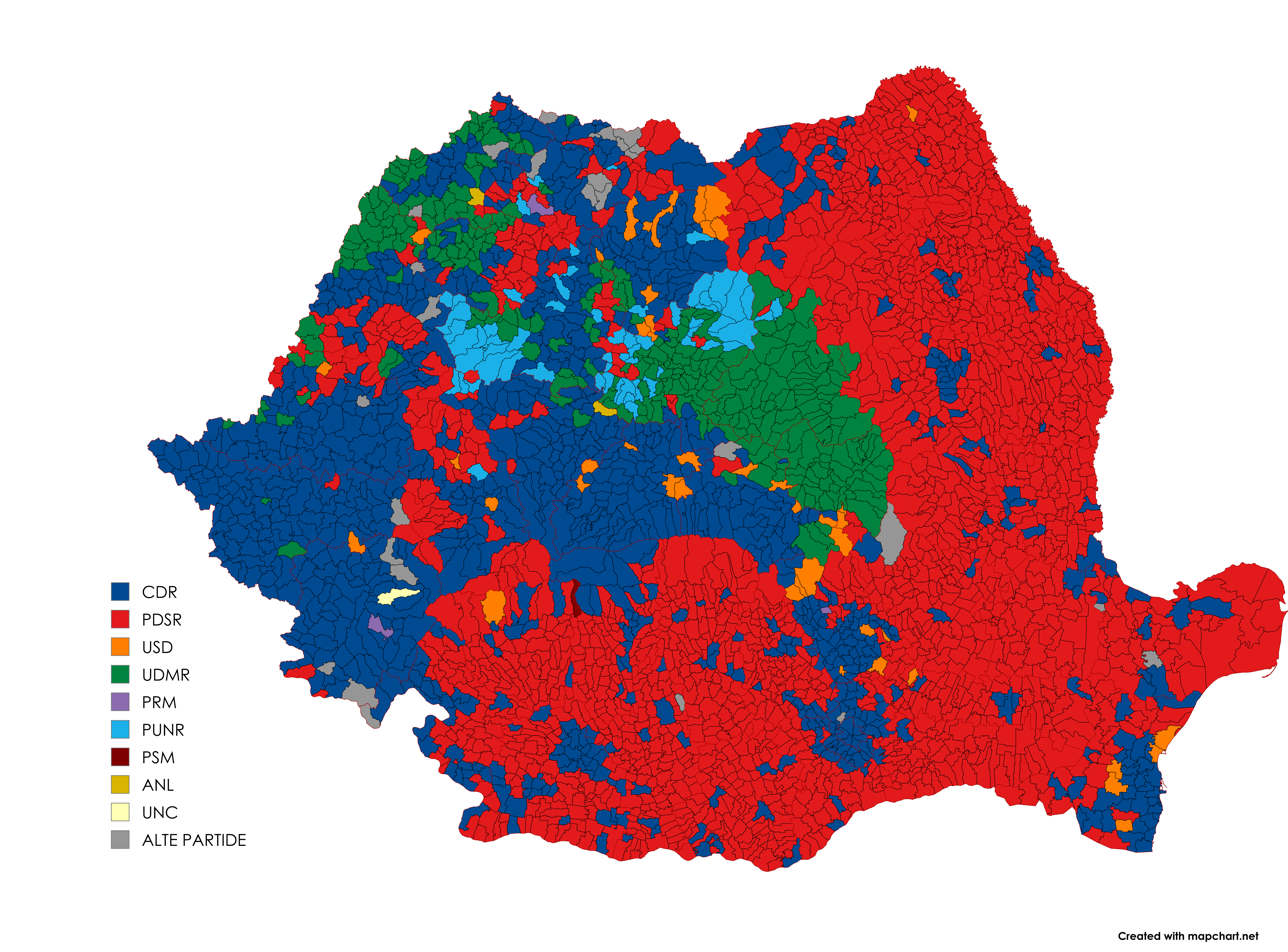
Results of the 1996 Romanian legislative elections, showing the number of votes for the party that won a plurality in each locality. Results for the Chamber of Deputies.

Party	Votes	%	Seats	+/–
Romanian Democratic Convention	3,692,321	30.17	122	+40
Party of Social Democracy in Romania	2,633,860	21.52	91	−26
Social Democratic Union (PSDR–PD)	1,582,231	12.93	53	+10
Democratic Alliance of Hungarians in Romania	812,628	6.64	25	−2
Greater Romania Party	546,430	4.46	19	+3
Romanian National Unity Party	533,348	4.36	18	−12
Socialist Party	280,364	2.29	0	New
Socialist Party of Labour	262,563	2.15	0	−13
Romanian Socialist Party of Workers	212,303	1.73	0	New
National Liberal Alliance	192,495	1.57	0	New
Party of Pensioners of Romania	175,676	1.44	0	New
National Union of the Centre (PDAR–MER–PUR)	106,069	0.87	0	0
National Peasant Party	102,831	0.84	0	0
National Liberal Ecologist Alliance (PNL–C–PAV-E)	96,412	0.79	0	New
Party of the Roma	82,195	0.67	1	0
Roma Union	71,020	0.58	0	New
National Democratic Christian Party	69,380	0.57	0	0
National Party of the Motorists	56,387	0.46	0	New
Romanian Working Party	50,011	0.41	0	New
New Romania Party	33,672	0.28	0	New
Free Republican Party	29,576	0.24	0	0
Ecological Convention Party of Romania	27,544	0.23	0	New
Party of Reunification–Dacian-Latin Option	25,620	0.21	0	New
Democratic Forum of Germans	23,888	0.20	1	0
Party of Former Non-Communists and Political Prisoners	21,060	0.17	0	New
Christian Democratic Union	19,693	0.16	0	0
Party for the Motherland	17,841	0.15	0	New
Republican Party	17,190	0.14	0	0
Party of Social Protection of Romania	16,762	0.14	0	New
Hungarian Free Democratic Party of Romania	14,333	0.12	0	New
Federation of the Jewish Communities in Romania	12,746	0.10	1	New
Party of Private Entrepreneurs–Social Democratic Party	11,990	0.10	0	New
Community of the Lipovan Russians	11,902	0.10	1	0
Union of Armenians of Romania	11,543	0.09	1	0
Italian Community of Romania	11,454	0.09	1	0
Liberal Christian Party	10,345	0.08	0	New
Association of Italians of Romania	9,833	0.08	0	New
Romanian Socialist Party	9,103	0.07	0	New
Cultural Union of Albanians of Romania	8,722	0.07	1	New
Hellenic Union of Romania	8,463	0.07	1	0
Party of the Revival of Romania 'Ion Mihalache'	7,751	0.06	0	New
Party of the Romanian Revolution	7,340	0.06	0	New
Union of the Ukrainians of Romania	7,165	0.06	1	0
Democratic Union of Serbs and Carasovenians in Romania	6,851	0.06	1	0
Democratic Union of Slovaks and Czechs of Romania	6,531	0.05	1	0
Democratic Union of Turkish-Muslim Tatars	6,319	0.05	1	0
Bratstvo Community of Bulgarians in Romania	5,359	0.04	1	New
Community of the Roma Ethnicity in Romania	5,227	0.04	0	New
Democratic Turkish Union of Romania	4,326	0.04	1	0
Democratic Union of Ukrainians in Romania	4,132	0.03	0	New
Bulgarian Union of Banat–Romania	4,115	0.03	0	−1
Forum of the Szeklers Youth	2,142	0.02	0	New
Union of Poles of Romania	1,842	0.02	1	0
Federation of Italians in Romania	1,711	0.01	0	New
Hellenic Union of Romania–Prahova Hellenic Community	1,509	0.01	0	New
Party of Democratic Solidarity	1,352	0.01	0	New
Community of Italians from Galați	791	0.01	0	New
Community of Italians from Pitești	695	0.01	0	New
General Union of the Associations of the Huțul Ethnicity	646	0.01	0	New
Union of the Roma, Constanța County	640	0.01	0	New
Union of Croats of Romania	486	0.00	0	0
Social Cultural Association in Romania	439	0.00	0	New
Italian Community – Prahova County	437	0.00	0	New
Federation of Italians in Romania – Italian Community Ovidius Constanța	311	0.00	0	New
Independents	248,825	2.03	0	0
Total	12,238,746	100.00	343	+2
Valid votes	12,238,746	93.51		
Invalid/blank votes	849,642	6.49		
Total votes	13,088,388	100.00		
Registered voters/turnout	17,218,654	76.01		
Source: Nohlen & Stöver, University of Essex
