= 1992 Romanian local elections =

Local elections were held in Romania in 1992 on 9 February (first round) and 23 February (second round). They were the first local elections after the 1989 Romanian revolution and the first free local elections in the country since 1937. In the wake of these local elections, Bucharest's mayor became Crin Halaicu from the National Liberal Party (PNL).

== Electoral map ==
Political map depicting the county president and county seat mayor by winning party
