= Victor Surdu =

Romanian politician

Raul-Victor Surdu-Soreanu (11 July 1947 – 7 April 2011) was a Romanian politician who served as the country's first post-Communist Minister of Agriculture following the 1989 Revolution. He was a member of the Social Democratic Party (PSD).

Surdu was born in Iaşi. He worked as a manager for Romania's collective farm system during the Communist era, and then joined the National Salvation Front (FSN), which took power after the overthrow of Nicolae Ceaușescu.

Surdu served as Minister of Agriculture from 1989 to 1990. He was a member of the Chamber of Deputies for the Democratic Agrarian Party of Romania (PDAR) from 1990 to 1992, and for the Social Democratic Party (PSD) from 2008 until his death. For a brief period in the mid-1990s, he was deputy manager of Lukoil of Romania.

Surdu died from pancreatic cancer in Bucharest in 2011, at the age of 63.

He was married to singer Angela Similea, and had three children.
