= 1990 Romanian general election =

- 20 May 1990
- Turnout: 86.20%
- Presidential election
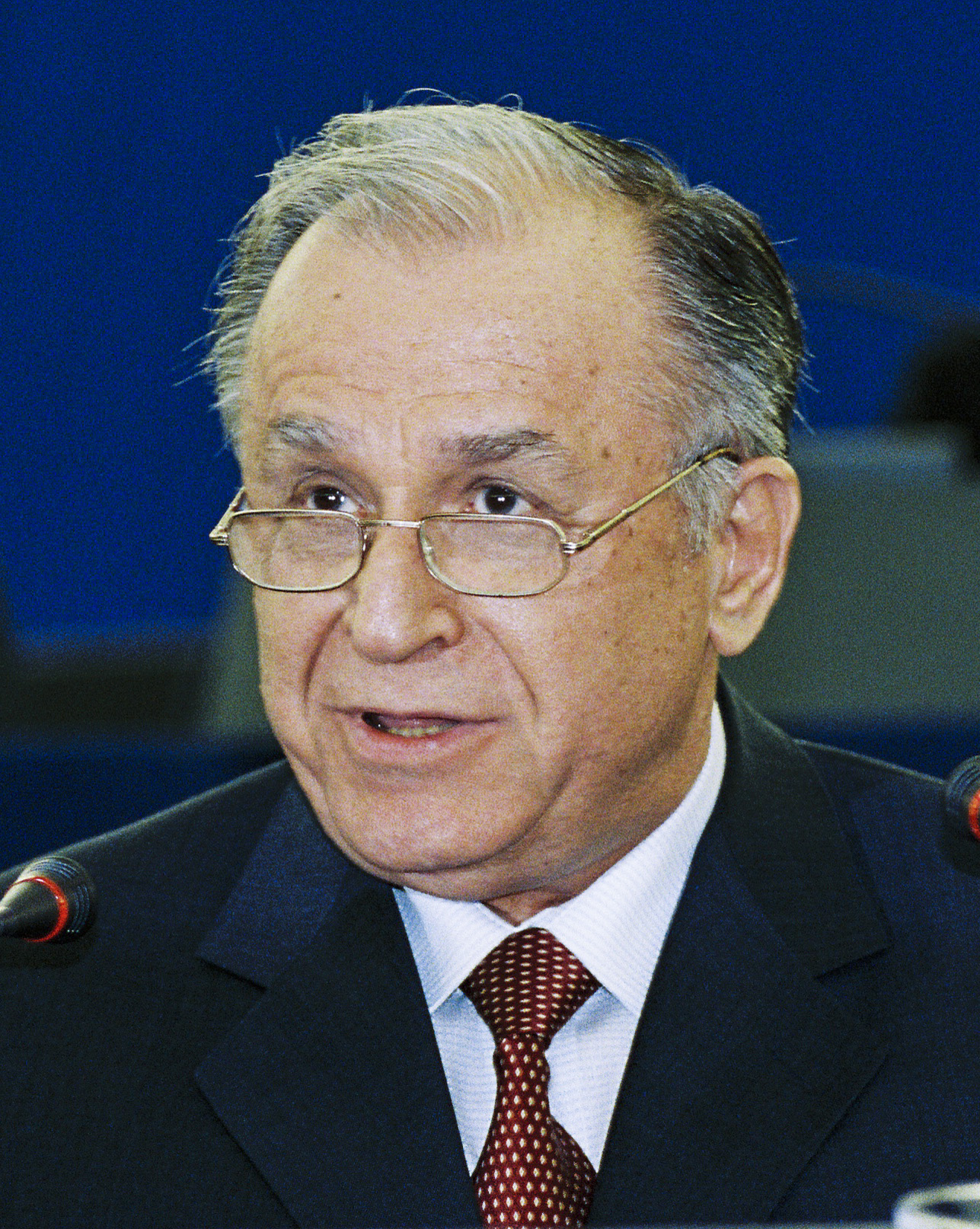

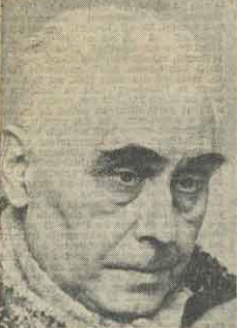

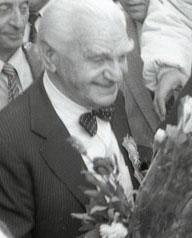
Nominee	Ion Iliescu	Radu Câmpeanu	Ion Rațiu
Party	FSN	PNL	PNȚCD
Popular vote	12,232,498	1,529,188	617,007
Percentage	85.07%	10.64%	4.29%
- Results by county Iliescu: 60–70% 70–80% 80–90% >90% Câmpeanu: 60–70% 70–80%
President before election
Ion Iliescu (provisional)
FSN
Elected President
Ion Iliescu
FSN
- Assembly of Deputies
- All 396 seats in the Assembly of Deputies
Party	Leader	Vote %	Seats
FSN	Ion Iliescu	66.31	263
UDMR	Géza Domokos	7.23	29
PNL	Radu Câmpeanu	6.41	29
MER	Toma George Maiorescu	2.62	12
PNȚCD	Corneliu Coposu	2.56	12
AUR		2.12	9
PDAR	Victor Surdu	1.83	9
PER	Otto Weber	1.69	8
PSDR (Socialist)	Cornel Nica	1.05	5
PSDR (Social)	Sergiu Cunescu	0.53	2
GDC		0.48	2
PDM		0.38	1
PLS	Ștefan Cazimir	0.34	1
PRN		0.32	1
PTLDR		0.32	1
UL–B		0.27	1
Minority parties		0.99	11
This lists parties that won seats. See the complete results below.
Results by county
- Senate
- All 119 seats in the Senate
Party	Leader	Vote %	Seats
FSN	Ion Iliescu	67.02	91
UDMR	Géza Domokos	7.20	12
PNL	Radu Câmpeanu	7.06	10
PNȚCD	Corneliu Coposu	2.50	1
MER	Toma George Maiorescu	2.45	1
AUR		2.15	2
PER	Otto Weber	1.38	1
Independents	Antonie Iorgovan	3.06	1
This lists parties that won seats. See the complete results below.
Results by county
Prime Minister before	Prime Minister-designate
Petre Roman; FSN	Petre Roman; FSN

General elections were held in Romania on 20 May 1990 to elect the President and members of Parliament. They were the first elections held after the overthrow of the communist regime six months earlier and the first free elections held in the country since 1937. It was also the first time the president had been directly elected, the position having been previously elected by the legislature since it was introduced in 1974.

The National Salvation Front (FSN), which had headed the interim government that took power after the overthrow of Nicolae Ceaușescu, won a decisive victory. Opposition parties performed well below expectations; none of them had the time or resources to present themselves as alternatives to the FSN. Interim President and FSN leader Ion Iliescu was elected for a full term with 85 percent of the vote. The FSN also won large majorities in both houses of Parliament, with 263 of the 395 seats in the Assembly of Deputies and 91 of the 118 seats in the Senate.

The United States State Department expressed concerns about organised violence and polling irregularities, but concluded that they had had no effect on the outcome and pronounced the elections free and fair.

To date, this is the only time since direct presidential elections were introduced in which a president was elected in a single round. Iliescu's 85 percent vote share also remains the highest for a direct presidential election.

== Presidential candidates ==
Name	Lifespan	Public Administration Experience	Affiliation and endorsements	Alma mater and profession	Candidacy Announcement dates
Ion Iliescu	Born: March 3, 1930 (age 60); Oltenița, Călărași County; Died August 5, 2025, Bucharest	Acting President of Romania: 1989–election day President of Water Surfaces Management Council (1979–1984); Member of the State Council (full member: 1979–1980, observative: 1974–1979); President of Iași County Council (1974–1979); Vice-president of Timiș County Council (1971–1974); Minister of Youth (1967–1971); Deputy (1957–1961, 1965–1973, 1975–1985)	Affiliation: FSN	Energy Institute, Moscow State University (1954) fluid mechanics engineer, publishing house manager	Official: April 8, 1990; BEC filing: April 17, 1990
Radu Câmpeanu	Born: February 28, 1922 (age 68); Bucharest; Died October 19, 2016, Bucharest		Affiliation: PNL; Endorsed by UDMR and PER	Faculty of Law, University of Bucharest (1945); Faculty of Economic Sciences, University of Bucharest (1947) economist	BEC filing: April 19, 1990
Ion Rațiu	Born: June 6, 1917 (age 72); Turda, Cluj County; Died: January 17, 2000, London	Chancellor at Romanian Embassy in UK (1940)	Affiliation: PNȚCD; Endorsed by: PSDR	Faculty of Law, Babeș-Bolyai University, Cluj-Napoca (1938); Faculty of Economics, University of Cambridge (1943) lawyer, economist, journalist	Official: April 6, 1990; BEC filing: April 23, 1990

== Results ==
=== President ===
Candidate	Party	Votes	%
Ion Iliescu	National Salvation Front	12,232,498	85.07
Radu Câmpeanu	National Liberal Party	1,529,188	10.64
Ion Rațiu	Christian Democratic National Peasants' Party	617,007	4.29
Total		14,378,693	100.00
Valid votes		14,378,693	96.98
Invalid/blank votes		447,923	3.02
Total votes		14,826,616	100.00
Registered voters/turnout		17,200,722	86.20
Source: AEP

Vote share
Iliescu	85.07%
Câmpeanu	10.64%
Rațiu	4.29%

Ion Iliescu

Radu Câmpeanu

Ion Rațiu

Overview

=== Parliament ===
==== Senate ====
Senate results

Party	Votes	%	Seats
National Salvation Front	9,353,006	67.02	91
Democratic Alliance of Hungarians in Romania	1,004,353	7.20	12
National Liberal Party	985,094	7.06	10
Christian Democratic National Peasants' Party	348,687	2.50	1
Ecological Movement of Romania	341,478	2.45	1
Alliance for Romanian Unity	300,473	2.15	2
Democratic Agrarian Party of Romania	221,790	1.59	0
Ecologist Party of Romania	192,574	1.38	1
Romanian Socialist Democratic Party	152,989	1.10	0
Romanian Social Democratic Party	69,762	0.50	0
Democratic Group of the Centre	65,440	0.47	0
National Reconstruction Party	52,465	0.38	0
Party of Free Change	46,247	0.33	0
Democratic Party of Labour	44,360	0.32	0
Liberal Union–Brătianu	35,943	0.26	0
Party of Young Free Democrats	32,506	0.23	0
Cooperatist Party	22,869	0.16	0
Christian Democratic Union	21,210	0.15	0
Democratic Union of the Roma of Romania	19,847	0.14	0
Democratic Forum of Germans	19,105	0.14	0
Liberal Party of Freedom of Romania	14,546	0.10	0
Democratic Environmentalist Party	14,496	0.10	0
Party of Democratic Unity	14,069	0.10	0
Party of Democratic Unity of Moldova	13,111	0.09	0
Party of Labour	11,397	0.08	0
Republican Christian Party	11,045	0.08	0
Grouping of the Centre 'New Romania'	9,405	0.07	0
Humanistic Ecological Party - founded in Arad	8,888	0.06	0
Turkish Muslim Democratic Union	8,489	0.06	0
Union of the Ukrainians of Romania	8,310	0.06	0
Party Christian Orthodox Union	7,324	0.05	0
Democratic Union 'Tara Oasului'	7,181	0.05	0
Party of Christian Union of Romania	7,045	0.05	0
Romanian Christian Social Democratic Party	6,964	0.05	0
Party of the Gypsies of Romania	5,565	0.04	0
Party of Social Justice	5,344	0.04	0
Party Alliance for Democracy	4,958	0.04	0
Party of Labour and Social Justice of Romania	4,490	0.03	0
Romanian Party for a New Society	3,860	0.03	0
Romanian Peasant Party	3,547	0.03	0
Republican Union Party	3,280	0.02	0
Party for National and Democratic Reconstruction	3,228	0.02	0
Democratic Party of Cluj	2,751	0.02	0
Radical Democratic Party	2,600	0.02	0
Free Democratic Union of Roma of Romania	2,505	0.02	0
Romanian Popular Front of National Salvation	1,660	0.01	0
Association of Former Political Prisoners/Detainees and Victims of the Dictatorship in Romania	1,613	0.01	0
Humanitarian Party of Peace	1,599	0.01	0
Constitutional Democratic Party of Romania	1,224	0.01	0
Party for the Honouring of the Heroes of the Revolution and National Salvation	1,089	0.01	0
Romanian National Party	1,019	0.01	0
Party Democratic Future of the Motherland	1,008	0.01	0
Democratic Progressive Party	914	0.01	0
Union of Poles of Romania	848	0.01	0
National Republican Party	754	0.01	0
Workers Alliance 'Freedom' Anticommunist and Antifascist	672	0.00	0
National Progressive Party	634	0.00	0
Party of the Romanian House of Democratic Europe	553	0.00	0
Movement 'Young Democracy'	462	0.00	0
Independents	427,535	3.06	1
Total	13,956,180	100.00	119
Valid votes	13,956,180	94.13	
Invalid/blank votes	869,584	5.87	
Total votes	14,825,764	100.00	
Registered voters/turnout	17,200,722	86.19	
Source: AEP

==== Assembly of Deputies ====
Assembly of Deputies results

Party	Votes	%	Seats
National Salvation Front	9,089,659	66.31	263
Democratic Alliance of Hungarians in Romania	991,601	7.23	29
National Liberal Party	879,290	6.41	29
Ecological Movement of Romania	358,864	2.62	12
Christian Democratic National Peasants' Party	351,357	2.56	12
Alliance for Romanian Unity	290,875	2.12	9
Democratic Agrarian Party of Romania	250,403	1.83	9
Ecologist Party of Romania	232,212	1.69	8
Romanian Socialist Democratic Party	143,393	1.05	5
Romanian Social Democratic Party	73,014	0.53	2
Democratic Group of the Centre	65,914	0.48	2
Democratic Party of Labour	52,595	0.38	1
Party of Free Change	47,017	0.34	1
National Reconstruction Party	43,808	0.32	1
Party of Young Free Democrats	43,188	0.32	1
Democratic Forum of Germans	38,768	0.28	1
Liberal Union–Brătianu	36,869	0.27	1
Democratic Union of the Roma of Romania	29,162	0.21	1
Democratic Environmentalist Party	26,058	0.19	0
Cooperatist Party	24,749	0.18	0
Christian Democratic Union	24,001	0.18	0
United Democratic Party of the Roma Woodworkers and Fiddlers in Romania	21,847	0.16	0
Romanian Peasant Party	21,588	0.16	0
Liberal Party of Freedom of Romania	20,744	0.15	0
Community of the Lipovan Russians	17,974	0.13	1
Party Christian Orthodox Union	17,521	0.13	0
Socialist Party of Justice	17,484	0.13	0
Party of the Gypsies of Romania	16,865	0.12	0
Party of Democratic Unity from Moldova	16,863	0.12	0
Party of Democratic Unity	16,354	0.12	0
Union of the Ukrainians of Romania	16,179	0.12	1
Party of Christian Union	14,902	0.11	0
Humanistic Ecological Party	12,739	0.09	0
Romanian Party for the New Society	12,305	0.09	0
Party of Labour	10,744	0.08	0
Democratic Union of the Serbs of Romania	9,095	0.07	1
Grouping of the Centre 'New Romania'	9,073	0.07	0
Christian Republican Party	8,939	0.07	0
Turkish Muslim Democratic Union	8,600	0.06	1
Democratic Christian Party of the Roma of Romania	7,939	0.06	0
Party Alliance for Democracy	6,695	0.05	0
Democratic Union 'Țara Oasului'	6,215	0.05	0
Romanian Social Democratic Christian Party	6,194	0.05	0
Romanian Popular Front of National Salvation	5,208	0.04	0
Hellenic Union of Romania	4,932	0.04	1
Free Democratic Union of Roma in Romania	4,605	0.03	0
Democratic Union of Slovaks and Czechs of Romania	4,584	0.03	1
National Romanian Party	3,983	0.03	0
Bulgarian Union of Banat – Bulgarian Cultural Association from Bucharest	3,451	0.03	1
Radical Democratic Party	3,240	0.02	0
Party for National and Democratic Reconstruction	3,223	0.02	0
Republican Union Party	2,693	0.02	0
Independent Hungarian Party	2,578	0.02	0
Modern Democratic Movement	2,488	0.02	0
Union of Poles of Romania	2,372	0.02	1
Forum of Democracy and National Unity of Romania	2,176	0.02	0
Party of Labour and Social Justice of Romania	2,146	0.02	0
Party of the Democratic Future of the Motherland	2,091	0.02	0
Party of Social Justice (New Democracy) of the North West of Romania	2,073	0.02	0
National Republican Party	1,610	0.01	0
Progressive Democratic Party	1,495	0.01	0
Association of Former Political Prisoners/Detainees and Victims of the Dictatorship in Romania	1,404	0.01	0
National Progressive Party	1,116	0.01	0
Democratic Constitutional Party of Romania	946	0.01	0
Party for the Honouring of the Heroes of the Revolution and National Salvation	891	0.01	0
Democratic Party of Cluj	425	0.00	0
Union of Armenians of Romania	399	0.00	1
Party of the Romanian House of Democratic Europe	390	0.00	0
Movement 'Young Democracy'	328	0.00	0
Independents	256,656	1.87	0
Total	13,707,159	100.00	396
Valid votes	13,707,159	92.46	
Invalid/blank votes	1,117,858	7.54	
Total votes	14,825,017	100.00	
Registered voters/turnout	17,200,722	86.19	
Source: AEP
