= Ecological Movement of Romania =

Defunct political party in Romania

The Ecological Movement of Romania (Romanian: Mișcarea Ecologistă din România, MER) was a political party in Romania.

== History ==
Following the overthrow of the Communist regime in Romania, the MER was formed as a front for the post-Ceaușescu regime in an effort to attract the support of environmentalists. It received 2.6% of the Chamber of Deputies vote in the 1990 general elections, winning 12 seats. It also received 2.6% of the Senate vote, winning one seat. In December 1990 the party joined the National Convention for the Establishment of Reform and Democracy (CDR), a coalition opposing the National Salvation Front (FSN) government. The collapse of the coalition in January 1992 led to the party failing to win a seat in the 1992 general elections; although its vote share was reduced only marginally to 2.3% it lost all its seats.

It contested the 1996 elections as part of the National Union of the Centre alliance, alongside the Romanian Democratic Agrarian Party (PDAR) and the Humanist Party (PUR). However, the alliance received only 0.9% of the vote, failing to win a seat.

Călin Georgescu, who would later become one of the most prominent figures of the Romanian far-right, was the leader of the party's youth wing, the Ecologist Youth of Romania (TER), from 1990 to 1992. In 1992, TER split off from the party and became an NGO, while Georgescu remained its leader until 1996.

== Election results ==
=== Parliamentary elections ===
Election	Chamber			Senate			Position	Aftermath
Election	Votes	%	Seats	Votes	%	Seats	Position	Aftermath
1990	358,864	2.62	12 / 395	341,478	2.50	1 / 119	5th	Opposition to FSN government (1990–1991)
1990	358,864	2.62	12 / 395	341,478	2.50	1 / 119	5th	FSN–PNL–MER–PDAR government (1991–1992)
1992	243,740	2.25	0 / 341	231,401	2.11	0 / 143	10th	Extraparliamentary
1996	Part of the National; Union of the Centre		0 / 341	Part of the National; Union of the Centre		0 / 143	16th	Extraparliamentary
