= Democratic Agrarian Party of Romania =

Democratic Agrarian Party of Romania Partidul Democrat Agrar din România
- Abbreviation: PDAR
- Leader: Mihai Berca
- Founder: Victor Surdu
- Founded: 29 January 1990
- Dissolved: 14 March 1998
- Merged into: Romanian National Party
- Ideology: Agrarianism (Ruralism); Romanian nationalism
- Political position: Centre to centre-left
- National affiliation: National Union of the Centre (1996)

The Democratic Agrarian Party of Romania (Romanian: Partidul Democrat Agrar din România, PDAR) was a political party in Romania.

== History ==
The PDAR was formed on 29 January 1990 as a competitor to the Christian Democratic National Peasants' Party (PNȚCD). In the transitional government led by Petre Roman, PDAR member Nicolae Ștefan was Minister of Agriculture. The party received 1.8% of the Chamber of Deputies vote in the 1990 general elections, winning nine seats. It also received 1.6% of the vote in the Senate elections, but failed to win a seat.

Despite increasing its Chamber vote share in the 1992 general elections to 3%, it failed to win a seat. However, it won five seats in the Senate with 3.3% of the vote. It contested the 1996 elections as part of the National Union of the Centre alliance, alongside the Ecological Movement of Romania (MER) and the Humanist Party (PC). However, the alliance received only 0.9% of the vote, failing to win a seat. In 1998, the PDAR merged with the New Romania Party to form the Romanian National Party.

== Election results ==
=== Parliament ===
Election	Chamber			Senate			Position	Aftermath
Election	Votes	%	Seats	Votes	%	Seats	Position	Aftermath
1990	250,403	1.83	9 / 395	221,790	1.59	0 / 119	7th	Supported the FSN government (1990–1991)
1990	250,403	1.83	9 / 395	221,790	1.59	0 / 119	7th	FSN–PNL–MER–PDAR government (1991–1992)
1992	322,990	2.99	0 / 341	359,042	3.25	5 / 143	7th	Supported the PDSR–PUNR–PRM–PSM government
1996	Part of the National; Union of the Centre		0 / 341	Part of the National; Union of the Centre		0 / 143	16th	Extraparliamentary
