= Education in Paris =

Education in the capital of France

In the early 9th century, the emperor Charlemagne mandated all churches to give lessons in reading, writing and basic arithmetic to their parishes, and cathedrals to give a higher-education in the finer arts of language, physics, music, and theology; at that time, Paris was already one of France's major cathedral towns and beginning its rise to fame as a scholastic centre. By the early 13th century, the Île de la Cité Notre-Dame cathedral school had many famous teachers, and the controversial teachings of some of these led to the creation of a separate Left-Bank Sainte-Genevieve University that would become the centre of Paris's scholastic Latin Quarter best represented by the Sorbonne university.

Twelve centuries later, education in Paris and the Paris region (Île-de-France région) employs approximately 330,000 people, 170,000 of whom are teachers and professors teaching approximately 2.9 million children and students in around 9,000 primary, secondary, and higher education schools and institutions.

== Primary and secondary education ==
Paris is home to several of France's most prestigious high-schools such as Lycée saint Louis de Gonzague, Lycée Stanislas, Lycée Louis-le-Grand and Lycée Henri-IV. Other high-schools of international renown in the Paris area include the Lycée International de Saint Germain-en-Laye and the École Active Bilingue Jeannine Manuel.

The Kingsworth International School along with the International School of Paris, are within the city. The Internationale Deutsche Schule Paris, the American School of Paris, the British School of Paris, the German international school and École Japonaise de Paris, along with the Japanese international school are located in nearby suburbs.

== Higher-education ==
In the academic year 2004–2005, the Paris Region's 17 public universities, with its 359,749 registered students, comprised the largest concentration of university students in Europe. The Paris Region's prestigious grandes écoles and scores of university-independent private and public schools have an additional 240,778 registered students, that, together with the university population, creates a grand total of 600,527 students in higher education that year.

== Universities ==
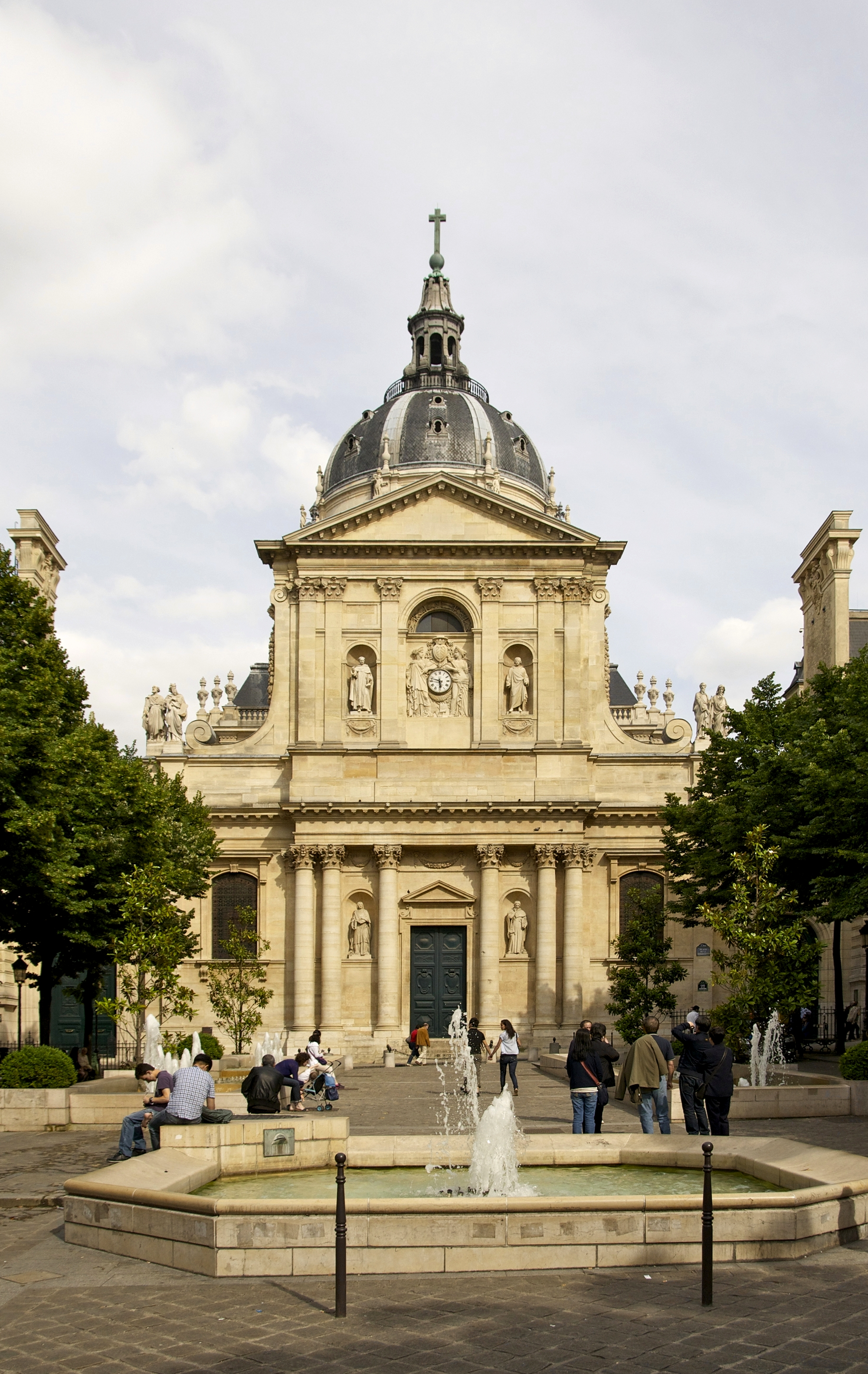
Sorbonne Chapel

The cathedral of Notre-Dame was the first centre of higher-education before the creation of the University of Paris, Le Sorbonne, which was founded in about 1150. The universitas was chartered by King Philip Augustus in 1200, as a corporation granting teachers (and their students) the right to rule themselves independently from crown law and taxes. At the time, many classes were held in open air. Non-Parisian students and teachers would stay in hostels, or "colleges", created for the boursiers coming from afar.

Already famous by the 13th century, the University of Paris had students from all of Europe. Paris's Rive Gauche scholastic centre, dubbed "Latin Quarter" as classes were taught in Latin then, would eventually regroup around the college created by Robert de Sorbon from 1257, the Collège de Sorbonne. The University of Paris in the 19th century had six faculties: law, science, medicine, pharmaceutical studies, literature, and theology. Following the 1968 student riots, there was an extensive reform of the University of Paris, in an effort to disperse the centralised student body. The following year, the former unique University of Paris was split between thirteen autonomous universities located throughout the city of Paris and its suburbs. Each of these universities inherited only some of the departments of the old University of Paris, and are not generalist universities. Panthéon-Assas University, Panthéon-Sorbonne University, Paris-Descartes University and Paris-Nanterre University inherited the law faculty; Paris Descartes University, Paris-East Créteil University, Paris-Diderot University and Pierre-and-Marie-Curie University inherited the medicine faculty, and the latter two inherited the scientific departments; Paris-Sorbonne University, Paris 8 University Vincennes-Saint-Denis, Sorbonne Paris North University and Sorbonne Nouvelle inherited the arts and humanities. Paris Dauphine University inherited the economy.

In 1991, four more universities were created in the suburbs of Paris, reaching a total of seventeen public universities for the Paris (Île-de-France) région. These new universities were given names (based on the name of the suburb in which they are located) and not numbers like the previous thirteen: Cergy-Pontoise University, University of Évry Val d'Essonne, University of Paris-Est Marne-la-Vallée and University of Versailles Saint-Quentin-en-Yvelines.

In the years 2010/2020 universities merger took place. Paris-Descartes University and Paris-Diderot University became Paris Cité University, Paris-Sorbonne University and Pierre-and-Marie-Curie University became Sorbonne University, and Cergy-Pontoise University became CY Cergy Paris University. Paris Sciences et Lettres University is created in 2010 from 11 constituent schools and universities. Paris-Saclay University is established in 2019 from Paris-Sud University and the merger of four technical grandes écoles, as well as several technological institutes, engineering schools, and research facilities. Gustave Eiffel University starts in 2020 from the former University of Paris-Est Marne-la-Vallée.

Students also have the opportunity to study abroad in North America via the MICEFA program.

== Grandes écoles ==
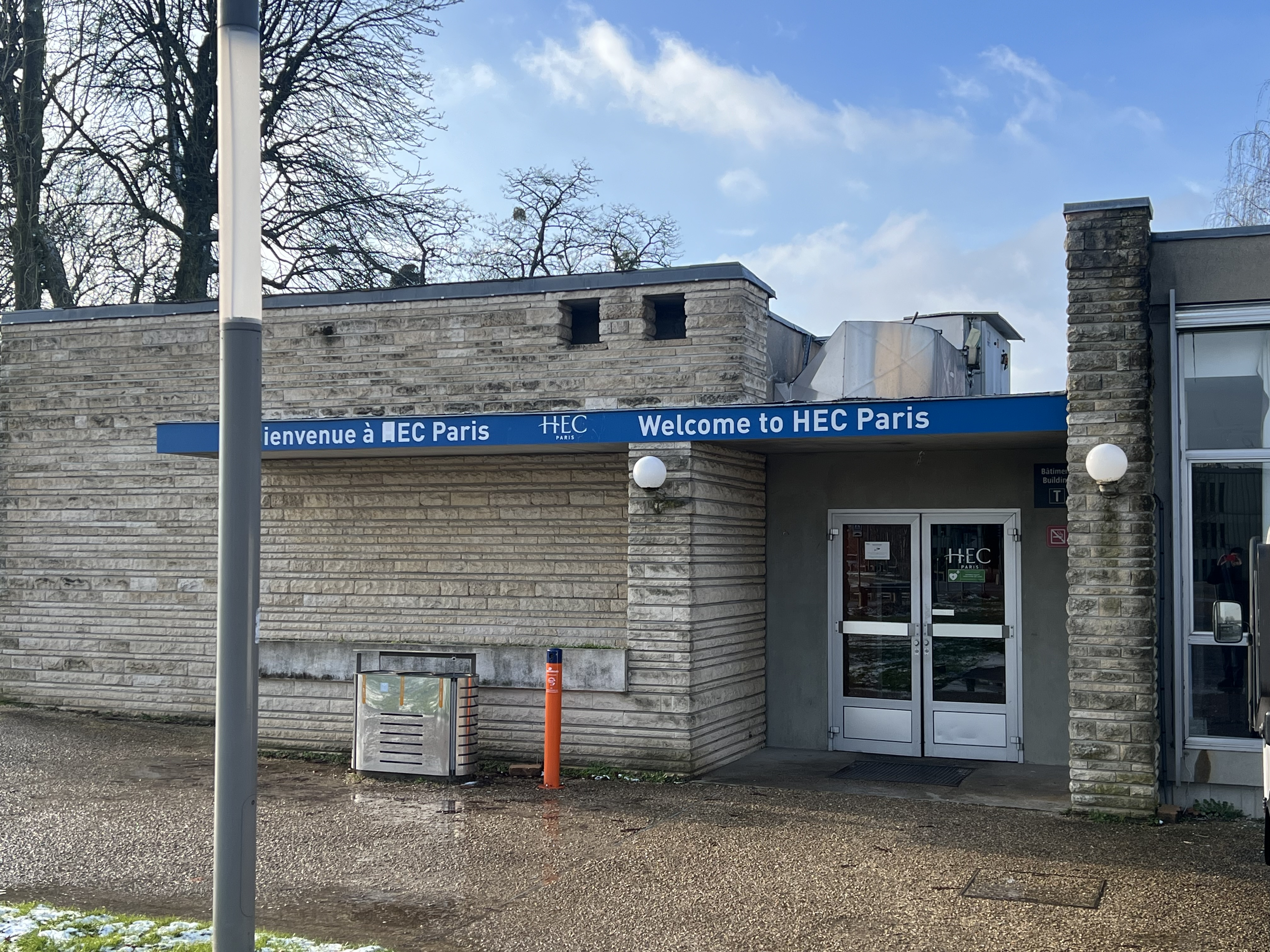
HEC Paris

The Paris region hosts France's highest concentration of the prestigious grandes écoles – specialised centres of higher-education outside the public university structure. The prestigious public universities are usually considered grands établissements. Most of the grandes écoles were relocated to the suburbs of Paris in the 1960s and 1970s, in new campuses much larger than the old campuses within the crowded city of Paris, though the École Normale Supérieure has remained on rue d'Ulm in the 5th arrondissement.

The Paris area hosts 55 grandes écoles, including a high number of engineering schools, some of them led by the prestigious Paris Institute of Technology (ParisTech) which comprises several colleges such as Arts et Métiers ParisTech, École Polytechnique, École des Mines, AgroParisTech, Télécom Paris, and École des Ponts et Chaussées. Other prestigious engineering schools are located in Paris, including CentraleSupélec, considered one of the top 3 in France, and ENSTA. In 2019, five engineering grandes écoles (École polytechnique, ENSTA, ENSAE, Télécom Paris and Telecom SudParis) grouped together in the Polytechnic Institute of Paris. There are also many business schools, including INSEAD, ESSEC, HEC and ESCP. The administrative school such as ENA has been relocated to Strasbourg, the political science school Sciences Po is still located in Paris's left bank 7th arrondissement. The Parisian school of journalism CELSA département of the Sorbonne University is located in Neuilly-sur-Seine.

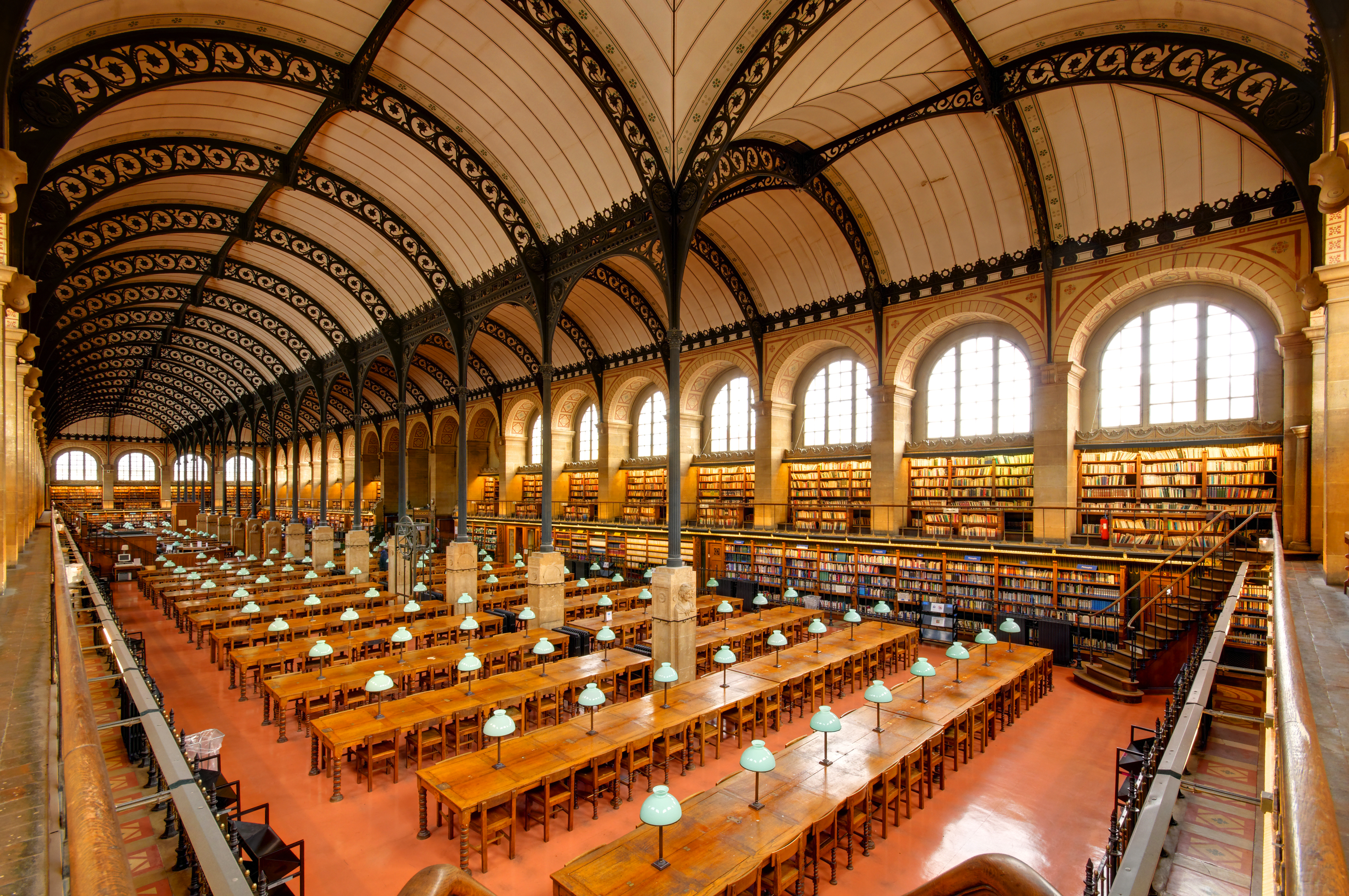
Sainte-Geneviève Library

The grandes écoles system is supported by a number of preparatory schools that offer courses of two to three years' duration called Classes Préparatoires, also known as classes prépas or simply prépas. These courses provide entry to the grandes écoles. Many of the best prépas are located in Paris, including Lycée Louis-le-Grand, Lycée Henri-IV, Lycée Saint-Louis, Lycée Janson de Sailly, and Lycée Stanislas. Two other top-ranking prépas (Lycée Hoche and Lycée privé Sainte-Geneviève) are located in Versailles, near Paris. Student selection is based on school grades and teacher remarks. Prépas are known to be very demanding in terms of work load and psychological stress.

== Private foundations ==
The Pasteur Institute (French: Institut Pasteur) is a French non-profit private foundation dedicated to the study of biology, micro-organisms, diseases, and vaccines.

== Miscellaneous education ==
The École de langue japonaise de Paris (パリ日本語補習校 Pari Nihongo Hoshūkō), a supplementary Japanese education programme, is held at the École Maternelle et Primaire Saint Francois d'Eylau in the 16th arrondissement of Paris. The school has its offices at the Association Amicale des Ressortissants Japonais en France (AARJF) in the 8th arrondissement.
