= Florence Merlevède =

French probability theorist

Florence Merlevède is a French probability theorist whose research interests focus on dependent and weakly dependent random variables, including Bernstein inequalities and central limit theorems for these variables. She is a professor in the laboratory for analysis and applied mathematics at Gustave Eiffel University, associated with the research group on probability and statistics there.

Merlevède earned her Ph.D. at Pierre and Marie Curie University in 1996, with a dissertation jointly supervised by Denis Bosq and Magda Peligrad. With Peligrad and Sergey Utev, she is coauthor of the book Functional Gaussian Approximation for Dependent Structures (Oxford University Press, 2019). She is on the editorial board of the journal Probability Theory and Related Fields.

In 2021, Merlevède was named a Fellow of the Institute of Mathematical Statistics, "for outstanding contributions to the field of dependent random variables, especially for fundamental results concerning the conditional limit theorems, rates of convergence in the central limit theorem, and large random matrices".
