= Zsolt Szilágyi =

Zsolt Szilágyi may refer to:

- Zsolt Szilágyi (footballer) (born 1981), Romanian footballer of Hungarian descent
- Zsolt Szilágyi (politician) (born 1968), Romanian politician Hungarian descent
