= Christian Soize =

- Born: October 10, 1948 (age 77); Paris, France
- Education: Pierre and Marie Curie University
- Known for: Computational mechanics Uncertainty Quantification
- Awards: Alfred M. Freudenthal Medal (2022); IACM Computational Mechanics Award (2018); Officier dans l'Ordre des Palmes académiques (2016); Chevalier dans l'Ordre national du Mérite (2015); Chevalier dans l'Ordre des Palmes académiques (1995); Prix Madame-Victor-Noury (1995)
- Scientific career
- Fields: Computational mechanics; Uncertainty Quantification
- Workplaces: Gustave Eiffel University
- Doctoral advisor: Paul Krée

Christian Soize (October 10, 1948) is a French engineer and applied mathematician known for his contributions in computational mechanics and uncertainty quantification. He is an emeritus Professor at the Laboratoire Modélisation et Simulation Multi Echelle at Gustave Eiffel University.

== Contributions ==
Soize is an expert in uncertainty quantification and computational mechanics, known for the development of several numerical methods and probabilistic methodologies to deal with uncertainties in computational science and engineering, standing out for two pioneering methods: the nonparametric probabilistic approach, to take into account model uncertainties in computational physical models, and, more recently, the probabilistic learning on manifolds (PLoM) for statistical learning within small reduced datasets.

== Awards and honors ==
Soize is the recipient of several academic awards, including: Alfred M. Freudenthal Medal, IACM Computational Mechanics Award, Officier dans l'Ordre des Palmes académiques, Chevalier dans l'Ordre national du Mérite, European Association of Structural Dynamics (EASD) Senior Research Prize, Fellow of the Acoustical Society of America, International Association for Structural Safety and Reliability (IASSAR) Research Award, Chevalier dans l'Ordre des Palmes académiques, and the Prix Madame-Victor-Noury.

== Books ==
- C. Soize, Uncertainty Quantification. An Accelerated Course with Advanced Applications in Computational Engineering, Springer, 2017
- R. Ohayon and C. Soize, Advanced Computational Vibroacoustics - Reduced-Order Models and Uncertainty Quantification, Cambridge University Press, 2014
- C. Soize, Stochastic Models of Uncertainties in Computational Mechanics, American Society of Civil Engineers (ASCE), 2012
- C. Soize, Dynamique des structures, Eléments de base et concepts fondamentaux, Ellipse, 2001
- R. Ohayon and C. Soize, Structural Acoustics and Vibration, Academic Press, 1998
- C. Soize, The Fokker-Planck Equation for Stochastic Dynamical Systems and its Explicit Steady State Solutions, World Scientific Publishing Co Pte Ltd, 1994
- C. Soize, Méthodes mathématiques en analyse du signal, Masson, 1993
- P. Krée and C. Soize, Mathematics of Random Phenomena, D. Reidel Publishing Company, 1986
- P. Krée et C. Soize, Mécanique aléatoire, Dunod, 1983.
