= Christian Liberal Alliance =

Romanian electoral alliance

Christian Liberal Alliance Alianța Creștin-Liberală
- Abbreviation: ACL
- Leader: Klaus Iohannis (PNL); Vasile Blaga (PDL)
- Founded: 22 July 2014
- Dissolved: 16 November 2014 (Note: When the Democratic Liberal Party merged into the National Liberal Party)
- Ideology: Christian democracy Liberalism
- Political position: Centre-right
- European affiliation: Alliance of Liberals and Democrats for Europe Party; European People's Party
- European Parliament group: ALDE Group; EPP Group
- International affiliation: Liberal International; Centrist Democrat International
- Constituent parties: National Liberal Party; Democratic Liberal Party
- Colours: Yellow; Blue

The Christian Liberal Alliance (Romanian: Alianța Creștin-Liberală, ACL), also known as the PNL-PDL Alliance (Romanian: Alianța PNL-PDL), was an electoral alliance in Romania.

Placed on the centre-right of the political spectrum, the alliance was founded on 28 July 2014 by the National Liberal Party (PNL) and Democratic Liberal Party (PDL) prior to a planned future merger between the two parties in order to field a joint presidential candidate in the 2014 presidential election. In August 2014, the parties selected Klaus Iohannis, PNL party president and mayor of Sibiu (German: Hermannstadt), as presidential candidate.

In the first round of the 2014 presidential election held on 2 November 2014, ACL candidate Iohannis received 30.4% of the vote, coming in second place behind Victor Ponta, the Social Democratic Party (PSD) candidate and incumbent Prime Minister of Romania. In the runoff election held on 16 November 2014, Iohannis received 54.5% of the vote, becoming the surprise victor of the Romanian presidency. The alliance was disbanded on 17 November 2014 upon the merger of PNL and PDL.

== Electoral history ==
=== Presidential elections ===
Election	Candidate	First round			Second round		
Election	Candidate	Votes	Percentage	Position	Votes	Percentage	Position
2014	Klaus Iohannis	2,881,406	30.3%	2nd	6,288,769	54.4%	1st
