= Hungarian People's Party of Transylvania =

Political party in Romania representing the Hungarian minority

Hungarian People's Party of Transylvania Partidul Popular Maghiar din Transilvania Erdélyi Magyar Néppárt
- President: Zsolt Szilágyi
- Founded: 2011
- Dissolved: November 2022
- Merged into: Hungarian Alliance of Transylvania
- Headquarters: Cluj-Napoca, Cluj County, Transylvania, Romania
- Ideology: Hungarian minority interests Conservatism; Christian democracy Autonomism
- Political position: Right-wing
- European affiliation: European Free Alliance (EFA)

Website
- http://www.neppart.eu/

The Hungarian People's Party of Transylvania (Hungarian: Erdélyi Magyar Néppárt, EMNP, [ˈɛrdeːji ˈmɒɟɒr ˈneːpːaːrt]; Romanian: Partidul Popular Maghiar din Transilvania, PPMT) was a political party representing the Hungarian minority in Romania. It was founded in 2011.

Party was dissolved after merge with Hungarian Civic Party to form Hungarian Alliance of Transylvania in November 2022.

== Ideology and objectives ==
Map of the PPMT's proposed NUTS statistical regions of Romania, which would divide Romania into 15 regions.

It positions itself as an alternative for the Hungarian minority in Romania to the Democratic Alliance of Hungarians in Romania (UDMR/RMDSZ), the largest party representing the Hungarians/Magyars living in Romania. The party's aim is "to establish an own parliament and government in Transylvania" and to achieve autonomy for the Szeklerland. It also advocates territorial autonomy for Partium.

In June 2014, Tibor Toró made a proposal for the revision of the bilateral treaty between Romania and Hungary, which was signed in 1996: I think the basic treaty with Hungary should be amended to introduce a reference to the possibility of creating the legal framework of autonomy for national communities, specifically for Hungarians.

This political organization is closely associated with the European MP László Tőkés, who was described by the president Tibor Toró as "the mentor of the party".

In August 2021, the party proposed a similar law to the Hungarian anti-LGBT law.

== Electoral history ==
=== Legislative elections ===
Election	Chamber			Senate			Position	Aftermath
Election	Votes	%	Seats	Votes	%	Seats	Position	Aftermath
2012	47,955	0.65	0 / 412	58,765	0.79	0 / 176	7th	Opposition to USL government (2012–2014)
2012	47,955	0.65	0 / 412	58,765	0.79	0 / 176	7th	Opposition to PSD-UNPR-UDMR-PC government (2014)
2012	47,955	0.65	0 / 412	58,765	0.79	0 / 176	7th	Opposition to PSD-UNPR-ALDE government (2014–2015)
2012	47,955	0.65	0 / 412	58,765	0.79	0 / 176	7th	Neutral to the technocratic Cioloș Cabinet (2015–2017)
2016	did not compete							Neutral to PSD-ALDE government (2017–2019)
2016	did not compete							Neutral to PSD minority government (2019)
2016	did not compete							Neutral to PNL minority government (2019–2020)

=== Presidential elections ===
Election	Candidate	First round			Second round		
Election	Candidate	Votes	Percentage	Position	Votes	Percentage	Position
2014	Zsolt Szilágyi	53,146	0.56%	10th			
2019	did not compete						

== See also ==
- Hungarians in Romania
- Székely autonomy movement
