= Hungarian Alliance of Transylvania =

Romanian political party

Hungarian Alliance of Transylvania Erdélyi Magyar Szövetség Alianța Maghiară din Transilvania
- Abbreviation: EMSZ/AMT
- President: Zoltán Zakariás
- Vice-presidents: István Csomortányi; Vilmos Mosdóczi; Attila Örs Sorbán; Tibor T. Toró; József Bálint; Szilárd Csorba; Attila Györgyi
- Founded: 18 January 2020 (as alliance); 1 November 2022 (as party)
- Merger of: Hungarian People's Party of Transylvania; Hungarian Civic Party
- Headquarters: Strada Kossuth Lajos nr.20, Odorheiu Secuiesc
- Ideology: Hungarian minority interests; Székely autonomy; Regionalism; Conservatism
- Political position: Right-wing
- European affiliation: European Free Alliance (EFA)
- Colours: Green, red and black
- Senate: 0 / 134
- Chamber of Deputies: 1 / 330
- European Parliament: 0 / 33
- Mayors: 4 / 3,176
- County Councilors: 2 / 1,340
- Local Council Councilors: 172 / 39,900

Website
- emsz.org

The Hungarian Alliance of Transylvania (Hungarian: Erdélyi Magyar Szövetség, EMSZ; Romanian: Alianța Maghiară din Transilvania, AMT) is a political party representing the Hungarian minority in Romania. The party was founded on 1 November 2022, by merge between Hungarian People's Party of Transylvania and Hungarian Civic Party.

The party supports Székely autonomy according to the party website.

== History ==
The Hungarian Alliance of Transylvania was founded on 1 November 2022, after three years of negotiations and a merge process between PPMT and PCM. After announcement of the new party, the president, János Mezei, stated for Hungarian press agency MTI that his presidency will be for 2 years until the first congress that will elect a new leadership. Until then, the presidency will focus on building the organization and preparing the party for the local elections in 2024, it was also stated.

In January 2023, János Mezei was convicted of blackmail. He later resigned as party president as a result of the conviction.

In March 2023, at the first joint meeting of delegates within the Hungarian Alliance of Transylvania, which took place in Cristuru Secuiesc, elected MP Zoltán Zakariás as president. Also, a new logo was presented.

== Electoral history ==
=== Local elections ===
==== National results ====
Election	County Councilors (CJ)			Mayors			Local Councilors (CL)			Position
Election	Votes	%	Seats	Votes	%	Seats	Votes	%	Seats	Position
2020	22,875	0.31	7 / 1,340	24,591	0.32	79 / 3,176	29,715	0.40	296 / 39,900	15th
2024	16.693	0.21	2 / 1,340	25.372	0.28	4 / 3,176	30.442	0.35	172 / 39,900	18th

==== County results ====
Election	County	Votes	%	Councillors	+/-	Aftermath
2024	Bihor	4,221	1.6 (#6)	0 / 34	0	Extra-parliamentary
2024	Covasna	3,182	3.7 (#6)	0 / 30	▼3	Extra-parliamentary
2024	Harghita	9,290	7.2 (#3)	2 / 30	▼2	Opposition

== See also ==
- Hungarians in Romania
- Székely autonomy movement
