= MICEFA =

French-North American university partnership organization

MICEFA (Mission Interuniversitaire de Coordination des Échanges Franco-Américains) is a nonprofit organization that manages partnerships between universities throughout North America and in the area of Paris, France. Created in 1985, MICEFA has helped tens of thousands of students participate in cultural and scientific exchanges on both sides of the Atlantic. Students remain enrolled in, and pay tuition to, their home universities, while attending classes and receiving credits abroad. While the program is largely focused on undergraduates, some graduate study exchanges also may be arranged. The newest aspect of the exchange program is a medical exchange between several top medical schools in the United States and in Paris.

== North American universities ==
More than 60 North American universities are represented across the United States and Canada:

California State University (CSU) system

- Bakersfield
- Channel Islands
- Chico
- Dominguez Hills
- East Bay
- Fresno
- Fullerton
- Humboldt
- Long Beach
- Los Angeles
- Monterey Bay
- Northridge
- Pomona (Polytechnic)
- Sacramento
- San Bernardino
- San Diego State
- San Francisco State
- San Jose State
- San Luis Obispo (Polytechnic)
- San Marcos
- Sonoma State
- Stanislaus

City University of New York (CUNY) system

- Baruch College
- Borough of Manhattan Community College
- Brooklyn College
- City College
- College of Staten Island
- The Graduate Center
- Hunter College
- John Jay College of Criminal Justice
- La Guardia Community College
- Lehman College
- Medgar Evers College
- Queens College
- Queensborough Community College
- York College

State University of New York (SUNY) system

- Albany
- Binghamton University
- Brockport
- Buffalo
- Geneseo
- Oswego
- Potsdam
- Institute of Technology
- New Paltz
- Plattsburgh
- Purchase College

Others

- American University
- Baldwin-Wallace University
- Bellarmine University
- Centenary College of Louisiana
- Florida International University
- George Washington University
- Glendon College
- Louisiana State University
- Loyola University New Orleans
- Manhattan College
- McNeese State University
- New Mexico State University
- Northern Arizona University
- Pace University
- Rutgers, The State University of New Jersey
- Tarleton State University
- University of Connecticut
- University of Illinois at Chicago
- University of Louisiana at Lafayette
- University of Mary Washington
- University of Miami
- University of New Brunswick
- University of New Orleans
- University of Puerto Rico, Río Piedras Campus
- University of Saskatchewan
- University of South Florida
- University of Texas at Austin
- University of Waterloo
- University of Wisconsin-Milwaukee
- University of Wisconsin-Madison
- Vanderbilt University
- Xavier University of Louisiana

== French universities ==
All of MICEFA's university partners in France are located in the Paris metropolitan area:

- CY Cergy Paris University
- University of Évry Val d'Essonne
- Paris Panthéon-Sorbonne University
- Paris Sorbonne Nouvelle University
- Sorbonne University
- Université Paris Cité
- Paris 8 University Vincennes-Saint-Denis
- Paris Nanterre University
- Paris-East Créteil University
- Sorbonne Paris North University
- Paris-Saclay University
- University of Versailles Saint-Quentin-en-Yvelines
- Institut Catholique de Paris
- Panthéon-Assas University
- Gustave Eiffel University
- École normale supérieure Paris-Saclay
- Institut supérieur d'électronique de Paris
- Institut polytechnique des sciences avancées

== Medical exchange universities ==
In the United States:

- Albert Einstein College of Medicine of Yeshiva University, Bronx, NY
- Columbia University, New York City
- George Washington University, Washington, D.C.
- Harvard University, Cambridge, Mass.
- University of Illinois, Chicago
- University of Massachusetts, Worcester, Mass.
- University of Miami Miller School of Medicine, Miami
- University of Pennsylvania, Philadelphia
- Tulane University, New Orleans
- Weill-Cornell Medical College, New York City

In France:

- Paris Diderot University
- Paris Est-Creteil University
- Paris Pierre et Marie Curie University
- Paris Nord-Villetaneuse University
- Paris Sud-Orsay University
- Versailles Saint-Quentin-en-Yvelines University
