= Hungarian Civic Party (Romania) =

Hungarian Civic Party Partidul Civic Maghiar Magyar Polgári Párt
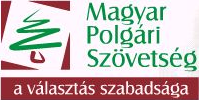
- President: Zsolt Bíró
- Founded: 2008
- Dissolved: November 2022
- Merged into: Hungarian Alliance of Transylvania
- Headquarters: Odorheiu Secuiesc
- Ideology: Székely autonomy Regionalism; Social conservatism
- Political position: Right-wing
- Colours: Red, white and green

Website
- www.polgaripart.ro

The Hungarian Civic Party (Hungarian: Magyar Polgári Párt, [ˈmɒɟɒr ˈpolɡaːri ˈpaːrt], Romanian: Partidul Civic Maghiar) was a political party of the Hungarian minority in Romania. It was founded in 2001 as the Hungarian Civic Union and was formally registered as a party on March 14, 2008. It positions itself as an alternative to the Democratic Alliance of Hungarians in Romania (UDMR/RMDSZ), the largest party representing Romania's Hungarian minority.

Party was dissolved after merge with Hungarian People's Party of Transylvania to form Hungarian Alliance of Transylvania in November 2022.

== Platform ==
The Hungarian Civic Party's main objective is territorial autonomy for the Székely Land, a region in central Romania which has a Hungarian majority.

In August 2021, the Party announced a law similar to Hungary's anti-LGBT law.

== Electoral performance ==
At the 2004 local elections, the majority of Hungarian Civic Union candidates were enrolled as independents or on common lists with the People's Action (AP) party. The best result was obtained in Harghita County, where three HCU candidates were elected to the county council. Jenő Szász, the president of the HCU, was also re-elected as mayor of Odorheiu Secuiesc, with 51.5% of the vote.

The party presented candidates to the 2008 local elections, gaining approximately 37% of the vote in the Székely Land, but did not participate in the nationwide 2008 Romanian legislative elections to Parliament in Bucharest.

== Cooperation with the Democratic Alliance of Hungarians in Romania ==
In 2014, the Hungarian Civic Party signed a settlement with the Democratic Alliance of Hungarians in Romania (UDMR/RMDSZ) about cooperation and joint support for Hungarian autonomy.

For the EP election 2019, the MPP tried to create a joint list with the RMDSZ, but failed. The chairman of the MPP, said that they would encourage their sympathisers to go to the election and vote in such a way that there would be a "stronger Hungarian representation" in the European Parliament.
