= Magda Peligrad =

Romanian mathematician

Magda Peligrad is a Romanian mathematician and mathematical statistician known for her research in probability theory, and particularly on central limit theorems and stochastic processes. She works at the University of Cincinnati, where she is Distinguished Charles Phelps Taft Professor of Mathematical Sciences.

== Education and career ==
Peligrad obtained her Ph.D. in 1980 from the Center of Statistics of the Romanian Academy. By 1983 she was working at the Sapienza University of Rome and by 1984 she had arrived at Cincinnati, where since 1988 she has supervised the dissertations of seven doctoral students.

With Florence Merlevède and Sergey Utev, she is coauthor of the book Functional Gaussian Approximation for Dependent Structures (Oxford University Press, 2019).

== Recognition ==
In 1995, Peligrad was elected as a Fellow of the Institute of Mathematical Statistics, which she had served in 1990 as the Institute's representative to the Joint Committee on Women in Mathematical Sciences, an umbrella organization for women in eight societies of mathematics and statistics. A conference on "limit theorems for dependent data and applications" was organized in her honor in Paris in 2010, celebrating her 60th birthday, by the researchers at four Parisian universities. She was named Taft professor in 2004.
