= Zsolt Szilágyi (politician) =

Romanian politician (born 1968)

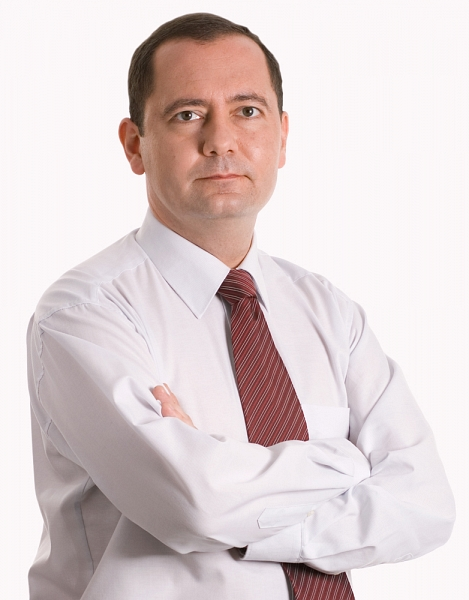

Personal details
- Born: 29 July 1968 (age 57) Oradea, Bihor County, Romania
- Party: Hungarian People's Party of Transylvania (PPMT)

Zsolt Szilágyi (Hungarian pronunciation: [ˈʒolt ˈsilaːɟi]; born July 29, 1968, in Oradea, Bihor County, Romania) is a Romanian politician, member of the Hungarian People's Party of Transylvania (PPMT).

He was a Democratic Alliance of Hungarians in Romania (UDMR/RMDSZ) deputy for Bihor County in the 1990–2004 period. At the 2009 European Parliament election he occupied the fourth position on the UDMR/RMDSZ list.

He is the former vice-president of Hungarian People's Party of Transylvania (PPMT) and was the party's candidate for the 2014 Romanian presidential election. He occupied the tenth position on the ballot.

In the first round of the election, Szilágyi received 0.56% of popular vote, subsequently both him and party president Tibor Toró T. submitted their resignation from their respective positions.

== Electoral history ==
=== Presidential elections ===
Election	Affiliation	First round			Second round		
Election	Affiliation	Votes	Percentage	Position	Votes	Percentage	Position
2014	PPMT	53,146	0.56%	10th			
