= Sergiu Mișcoiu =

Romanian researcher

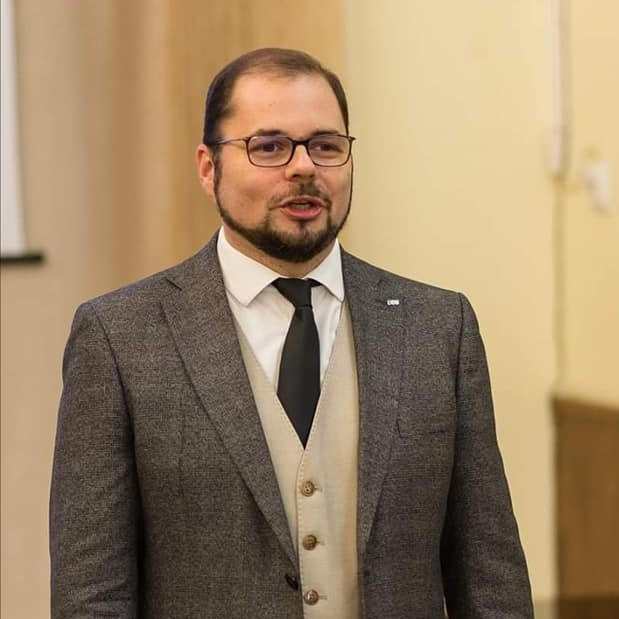

Sergiu Mișcoiu is a Romanian researcher and Professor of Political Science at the Faculty of European Studies, Babeș-Bolyai University in Cluj-Napoca. He is also the Director of the Center on International Cooperation at Babeș-Bolyai University and as Director of the Centre for African Studies (Cestaf).

He is a permanent member of the Political Studies Institute of the Paris-Est University (LIPHA) where he is PhD tutor (since 2010) and associate fellow professor (since 2007).

== Education and academic career ==
After his BA in European studies (2001) and his two MAs (Comparative European Studies at Babeș-Bolyai University and Political Science at Marne-la-Vallée/Gustave Eiffel University), he graduated a first PhD programme in History at Babeș-Bolyai University and a second PhD in Political Science (University of Paris, 2006). Throughout his career, he wrote four books, edited, co-edited and co-authored 20 volumes, wrote 61 chapters in collective volumes, 56 scientific articles.

He holds one PhD in Political Science (University of Paris-East Marne-la-Vallée), another PhD in History (Babes-Bolyai University), and a habilitation in Political Science (University of Paris-East). He was guest professor at the Universities of Nantes and Bordeaux (France), Warwick (UK), Bogota (Colombia), Marrakesh (Marocco), Yaoundé (Cameroon), Dakar (Senegal) and Abomey-Calavi (Benin, where was the co-founder of the country’s first PhD School in Political Science, in 2017). He was awarded the Paris Thesis Price (2007) and the Annual Research Prize of UBB (2015, 2020), as well as the Ordre des Palmes académiques given by the French Government (2012).

== Research interests ==
Sergiu Mișcoiu specializes in populist and nationalist parties, political transitions, deliberation and political behavior, with a particular focus on Central and Eastern Europe and Sub-Saharan Africa.

He has a wide experience in both theoretical and empirical research in the fields of party politics, electoral campaigns, the social impact of ideologies and electoral behaviour. He analyzed in depth the organisation and the appeal of populist, nationalist and extremist political parties and their interactions with the electorates and the mainstream political parties, as well as the processes of partisan and electoral mobilization by conducting both theory-driven investigation and field work (and in particular qualitative research) in Romania, Hungary, Moldova, France, Senegal, and Cameroon.

== Work ==
Mișcoiu has brought a contribution to the development of the research on populist and nationalist political parties and movements approached through the lenses of discourse theory, a research angle that he also introduced as a discipline at the doctoral school in European Studies (UBB) and at the interdisciplinary doctoral school of UPE. He has been involved in the top management of several relevant research projects in this field, as follows: co-leader of Europe rebelle, financed by the National Research Agency in France (2007–2010); director of Political Myths in Post-Communist Romania, financed by the National Council for Scientific Research in Romania (CNCS) (2010–2013); member of the Research team of Populism and neo-populism in Contemporary Romania (CNCS) (2009–2012). Based on the main findings concerning the nature and the dynamics of populist and nationalist parties, he published four co-edited books (2008–2016), and two monographs: the revised version of his PhD thesis (Naissance de la nation en Europe. Théories classiques et théorisations constructivistes, 2010) and his habilitation thesis' (HDR, Paris), Au pouvoir par le Peuple. Le populisme saisi par la théorie du discours (2012).

Mișcoiu has been a core group member and a working-group co-leader in the COST Action Constitution making and deliberative democracy, financed by the European Commission (since 2018) and a guest researcher at the Université libre de Bruxelles (2014), and at the Universities of Lille (France, 2015), Magdeburg (Germany, 2016) and Szeged (Hungary, 2020), where he mainly studied the complex roles of political parties and civil society’s actors in the emergence of deliberative democracy in several European countries, and the progress of new or renewed political parties as a consequence of democratic innovation processes. As a result, he co-edited a special issue of Political Studies Review (Sage, 2020), published several articles (in Problems of Post-Communism, Revue Est-Europa, Revue Générale de Droit).

== Books ==
- Political Myths in Contemporary Romania
- Le pouvoir par le « Peuple » ! Le populisme saisi par la théorie du discours, L’Harmattan, Paris, 2012, P. 140
- Naissance de la nation en Europe. Théories classiques et théorisations constructivistes, L’Harmattan, Paris, 2010, P. 207
- Formarea naţiunii. O teorie socio-constructivistă, Editura Fundaţiei pentru Studii Europene, Cluj-Napoca, 2006, P. 130
- Le Front National et ses répercussions sur l'échiquier politique français 1972-2002, Editura Fundaţiei pentru Studii Europene, Cluj-Napoca, 2005, P. 123
- Mişcoiu, Sergiu (2021). Democratic Consolidation and Europeanization in Romania: A One-Way Journey or a Return Ticket?. Cambridge Scholars Publishing. ISBN 978-1-5275-7442-7.
- Communication de crise et résolution des conflits en Afrique francophone, Cluj-Napoca, Casa Cărții de Știință, 2021, P. 160 (co-editor with Delia Pop-Flanja)
- Raconter les politiques conflictuelles en Afrique. Regards croisés, Paris, Editions du Cerf, 2021, P. 366 (co-editor with Simona Jișa and Modibo Diarra)
- Littérature et politique en Afrique francophone. Approche transdisciplinaire, Paris, Editions du Cerf, 2018, P. 367 (co-editor with Simona Jișa and Buata B. Malela)
- Intégration et désintégration en Europe Centrale et Orientale. Cahiers FARE no. 9, Paris, l’Harmattan, 2016, P. 330 (co-editor with Nicolae Paun)
- Recul démocratique et néo-présidentialisme en Afrique centrale et occidentale, Iaşi, Institutul European, 2015, P. 340 (co-editor with Hygin Kakaï and Kokou Folly Hetcheli)
- What is Left from the Left-Right Cleavage? A Comparative Perspective, Bucuresti, Editura Institutului de Stiinte Politice si Relatii Internationale al Academiei Romane, 2015, P. 236 (co-editor with Valentin Naumescu)
- Democratizare și consolidare democratică în Europa Centrală și de Est, Iaşi, Institutul European, 2014, P. 340 (co-editor with Sergiu Gherghina)
- Contemporary Populism: A Controversial Concept and its Diverse Forms, Cambridge, Cambridge Scholars Press, 2013, P. 380 (co-editor with Sergiu Gherghina and Sorina Soare)
- Populismul contemporan : un concept controversat si formele sale diverse, Institutul European, Iaşi, 2012, P. 480 (co-editor with Sergiu Gherghina and Sorina Soare)
- Partide şi personalităţi populiste în România post-comunistă, Institutul European, Iaşi, 2010, P. 315 (co-editor with Sergiu Gherghina)
