= Gustave Eiffel University =

Public university in France

- Université Gustave Eiffel
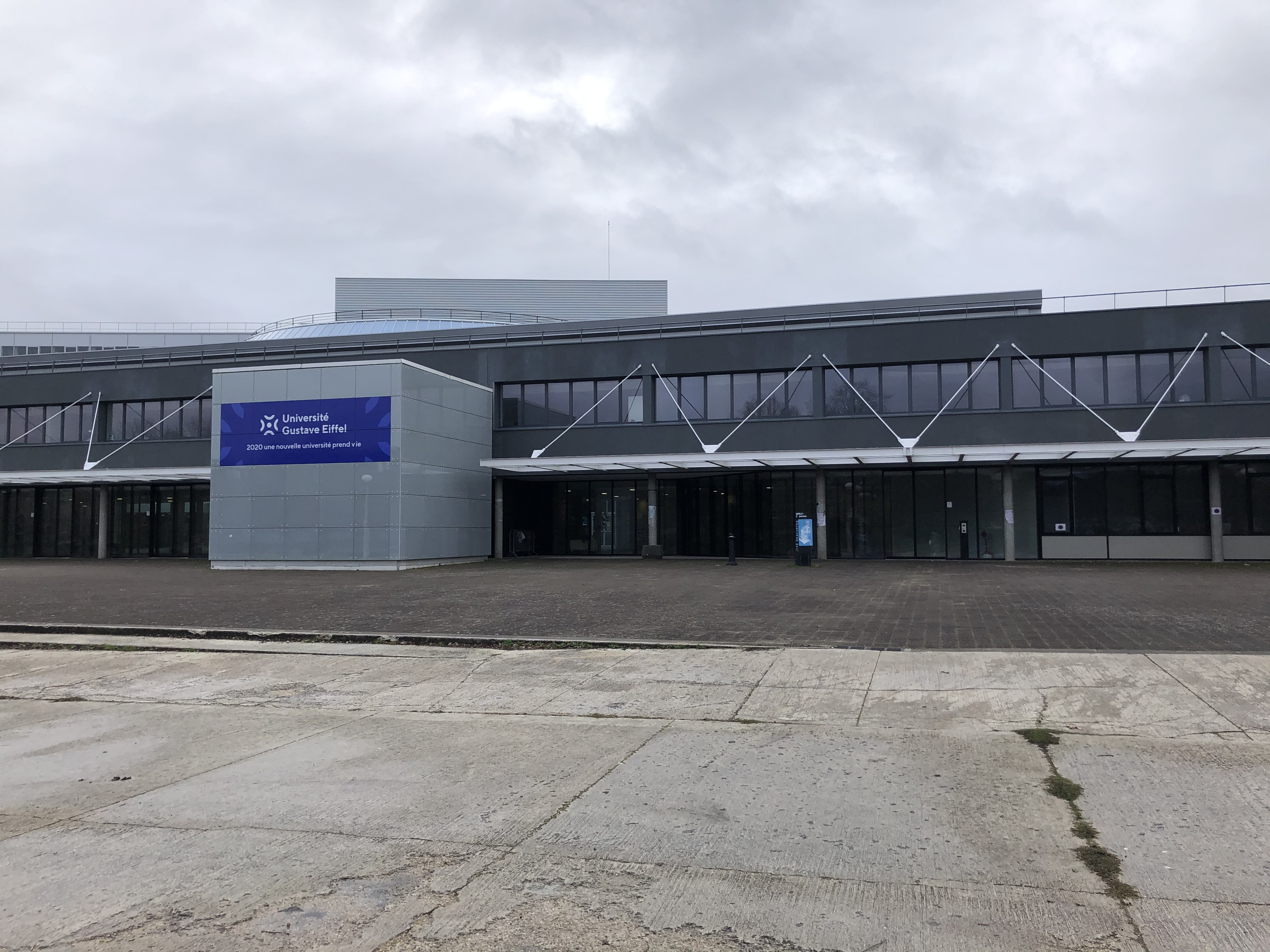
- The Copernic Building for Engineering
- Type: Public
- Established: 2020
- Affiliations: AUF, EUA
- Budget: €223 million
- President: Gilles Roussel
- Faculty: 2,300 including 400 professors, 550 researchers, and 1,320 other personnel
- Students: 17,000
- Location: Aix-en-Provence; Lille; Lyon; Marne-la-Vallée (Champs-sur-Marne); Nantes; Paris; Versailles, France
- Campus: Suburban
- Website: Official Site
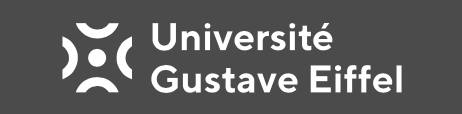

Gustave Eiffel University (French: Université Gustave Eiffel) is a public university located throughout Metropolitan France.

The university's namesake is French engineer, Gustave Eiffel, best known for the Eiffel Tower.

Gustave Eiffel University is known for its civil engineering and urban planning research.

== History ==
Gustave Eiffel University was created by a French government decree, and was founded on 1 January 2020. It is the result of a merger of the École d'Architecture Marne-la-Vallée, the École des ingénieurs de la Ville de Paris, the École Nationale des Sciences Géographiques, the École Supérieure d'Ingénieurs en Électrotechnique et Électronique Paris, the French Institute of Science and Technology for Transport, Development and Networks, and the former University of Paris-Est Marne-la-Vallée. The merger was decided upon despite initial opposition of unions representing UPEM workers.

== Academics ==
Gustave Eiffel University offers bachelors, vocational bachelors, and masters degrees in many fields ranging from arts and humanities to STEM. The university also offers architecture, BTS, engineering diplomas.

The university conducts significant research in relation to civil engineering, geomatics, infrastructure, transport systems, and urban planning.

International students comprise more than 10% of the student body.

== Campuses ==
The university's teaching and research occurs on 7 main campuses located across Metropolitan France, in the cities of Aix-en-Provence, Lille, Lyon, Marne-la-Vallée, Nantes, Paris, and Versailles, as well as on smaller sites in the cities of Belfort, Bordeaux, Brussels, Grenoble, Meaux, and Saclay.

== Notable people ==
Faculty

- Christian Soize (born 1948) - engineer and applied mathematician.
- Florence Merlevède - mathematician, probability theorist
- Yann Le Cun - mathematician, Turing price, artificial intelligence researcher, Facebook vice president

Alumni

- Sergiu Mișcoiu - political scientist, Babeș-Bolyai University, Romania
