= Romanian Socialist Party (1992–2015) =

Romanian Socialist Party Partidul Socialist Român
- Leader: Vasile Orleanu
- Founded: 1992
- Dissolved: 2015
- Headquarters: Bucharest
- Ideology: Democratic socialism Pro-Europeanism
- Colours: Red & Yellow

Website
- www.psr.ro

The Romanian Socialist Party (Romanian: Partidul Socialist Român) was a minor Romanian political party with a socialist ideology. It was briefly represented in the Romanian Parliament after two deputies, elected on the Greater Romania Party list, joined the organisation in 2002. The two MPs would leave the party the following year in order to create the United Socialist Party. In the 2008 elections, it won 0.01% of the vote in the Chamber of Deputies and 0.02% in the Senate. In 2015 the party name was taken over by the Socialist Alliance Party after the Bucharest Tribunal wrote the party out of the official register of political parties.

== Electoral history ==
=== Legislative elections ===
Election	Chamber			Senate			Position	Aftermath
Election	Votes	%	Seats	Votes	%	Seats	Position	Aftermath
1992	Did not compete							
1996	9,103	0.07	0 / 343	18,834	0.15	0 / 143	29th	Extra-parliamentary opposition to CDR-USD-UDMR
2000	11,916	0.11	0 / 345	12,961	0.12	0 / 140	26th	Extra-parliamentary support to PDSR minority government
2004	28,034	0.28	0 / 332	42,306	0.41	0 / 137	12th	Extra-parliamentary opposition to DA-PUR-UDMR (until April 2007)
2004	28,034	0.28	0 / 332	42,306	0.41	0 / 137	12th	Extra-parliamentary opposition to PNL-UDMR minority government
2008	585	0.00	0 / 334	445	0.02	0 / 137	9th	Extra-parliamentary opposition to PDL-PSD government (until December 2009)
2008	585	0.00	0 / 334	445	0.02	0 / 137	9th	Extra-parliamentary opposition to PDL-UNPR-UDMR (until May 2012)
2008	585	0.00	0 / 334	445	0.02	0 / 137	9th	Extra-parliamentary support to USL government (until December 2012)
2012	Did not compete							

== See also ==
- Communitarian Party of Romania
- Romanian Socialist Party (present-day)
