= Alliance PSD+PC =

Alliance PSD+PC Alianța PSD+PC
- Abbreviation: PSD+PC
- Leader: Mircea Geoană (PSD); Dan Voiculescu (PC)
- Founded: 2008
- Dissolved: 2010
- Ideology: Social democracy Social conservatism
- Political position: Centre-left
- Constituent parties: Social Democratic Party (PSD); Conservative Party (PC)

The Alliance PSD+PC (Romanian: Alianța PSD+PC) was a centre-left electoral alliance in Romania between 2008 and 2009.

== History ==
=== Formation ===
In continuation with the 2004 National Union PSD+PUR alliance, the new alliance was founded in 2008 between the Social Democratic Party (PSD) and the Conservative Party (PC), formerly Humanist Party of Romania (PUR) as a counterpart to the centre-right Justice and Truth Alliance (DA) between the National Liberal Party (PNL) and Democratic Party (PD).

=== 2008 and 2009 elections ===
It took part in the 2008 general elections and in the 2009 European Parliament election, with the alliance winning 11 seats, including one Conservatives' candidate: George Sabin Cutaş.

=== Dissolution ===
In late 2010, the Alliance dissolved, as Conservative Party (PC) joined the National Liberal Party (PNL) to form the Centre Right Alliance (ACD).

== Electoral history ==
=== Legislative elections ===
Election	Chamber			Senate			Position	Aftermath
Election	Votes	%	Seats	Votes	%	Seats	Position	Aftermath
2004	3,730,352	36.61	132 / 332	3,798,607	36.30	57 / 137	1st (as PSD+PUR)^{1}	Alliance dismantled in December 2004; DA-PUR^{2}-UDMR government (2004–2007); PSD in opposition
2004	3,730,352	36.61	132 / 332	3,798,607	36.30	57 / 137	1st (as PSD+PUR)^{1}	PSD supported a minority PNL-UDMR government (2007–2008); PC in opposition
2008	2,279,449	33.10	114 / 334	2,352,968	34.16	49 / 137	2nd ^{3}	PDL-PSD government (2008–2009); PC in opposition
2008	2,279,449	33.10	114 / 334	2,352,968	34.16	49 / 137	2nd ^{3}	Opposition to PDL-UNPR-UDMR government (2009–2012)
2008	2,279,449	33.10	114 / 334	2,352,968	34.16	49 / 137	2nd ^{3}	USL government (2012)

Notes:

^{1} National Union PSD+PUR members: PSD (46 senators and 113 deputies) and PUR (11 senators and 19 deputies).
^{2} Soon after the elections, PUR broke the alliance and switched sides, joining the Justice and Truth Alliance (DA) in forming the government.
^{3} Alliance PSD+PC members: PSD (48 senators and 110 deputies) and PC (1 senator and 4 deputies).

=== European elections ===
Election	Votes	Percentage	MEPs	Position	EU Party	EP Group
2007	PSD and PC competed separately					
2009	1,504,218	31.07%	11 / 33	1st ^{1}	PES	S&D

Notes:

^{1} Alliance PSD+PC members: PSD (10 MEPs) and PC (1 MEP).
