= Romanian Socialist Party (2003) =

Romanian Socialist Party Partidul Socialist Român
- Abbreviation: PSR
- President: Constantin Rotaru
- Founded: July 2003
- Split from: Socialist Party of Labour
- Headquarters: Șos. Olari 12, Sector 2, Bucharest, Romania
- Ideology: Communism; Socialist feminism Left-wing nationalism Anti-NATO
- Political position: Far-left
- National affiliation: România Socialistă
- European affiliation: Party of the European Left
- International affiliation: Sovintern; IMCWP
- Colours: Red
- Slogan: Schimbarea e tot mai aproape! ('The change is closer!')
- Senate: 0 / 135
- Chamber of Deputies: 0 / 330
- European Parliament: 0 / 33
- Mayors: 0 / 3,176
- County Councilors: 0 / 1,340
- Local Council Councilors: 2 / 39,900

Website
- psr.org.ro

The Romanian Socialist Party (Romanian: Partidul Socialist Român, PSR) is a political party in Romania formed as the Socialist Alliance Party (PAS) in 2003. It grew out of a wing of the Socialist Party of Labour (PSM) that objected to the merger of PSM with the Social Democratic Party in July 2003, and wanted the PSM to continue as a socialist party. Romanian authorities did not recognize this group as part of PSM, and instead made them take the name Socialist Alliance Party.

After absorbing the United Left Party in 2009, PAS was renamed as the Socialist Alternative Party in late 2013. In late 2014, the party changed its name to the Socialist Party of Romania, replacing the party of the same name that became defunct the previous year. The Socialist Party of Romania would adopt a communist program; the unregistered Romanian Communist Party (later known as the Communitarian Party of Romania) opposed this and had argued that the PSR was a "pseudo-communist party". The PSR had previously attempted to rename itself as the Romanian Communist Party at an extraordinary party congress in July 2010, placing itself in the tradition of the original Romanian Communist Party founded in 1921. This renaming was rejected by a tribunal in Bucharest.

In 2013, the party won 34 local seats. The party is led by a 165-member National Committee, a 60-member Directive Committee, and a 60-member Executive Bureau. PSR is a founding member of the Party of the European Left.

== Ideology ==
The Romanian Socialist Party is a communist party and places itself in the tradition of the original Romanian Communist Party.

Unlike its predecessor, the Socialist Party of Labour, the Romanian Socialist Party is more progressive on social issues, supporting socialist feminism. Much like its predecessor, the party is nationalistic and supports Ceauşescu nostalgia.

The party opposes the current form of the European Union, and considers Romania's involvement in the union as having brought the country more negative consequences than benefits. It has called for the creation of a "Europe of Nations" that would include Russia, and is supportive of European federalism. Like many other communist parties, the party opposes NATO and it strongly rejects Romania's membership in the military alliance.

== Electoral history ==
=== Legislative elections ===
Election	Chamber			Senate			Position	Aftermath
Election	Votes	%	Seats	Votes	%	Seats	Position	Aftermath
2004	28,429	0.28	0 / 332	37,019	0.36	0 / 137	15th	Extra-parliamentary opposition to DA-PUR-UDMR government (2004–2007)
2004	28,429	0.28	0 / 332	37,019	0.36	0 / 137	15th	Extra-parliamentary opposition to PNL-UDMR minority government (2007–2008)
2008	did not compete							Extra-parliamentary opposition to PDL-PSD government (2008–2009)
2008	did not compete							Extra-parliamentary opposition to PDL-UNPR-UDMR government (2009–2012)
2008	did not compete							Extra-parliamentary opposition to USL government (2012)
2012	2,331	0.03	0 / 412	2,171	0.03	0 / 176	9th	Extra-parliamentary opposition to USL government (2013–2014)
2012	2,331	0.03	0 / 412	2,171	0.03	0 / 176	9th	Extra-parliamentary opposition to PSD-UNPR-UDMR-PC government (2014)
2012	2,331	0.03	0 / 412	2,171	0.03	0 / 176	9th	Extra-parliamentary opposition to PSD-UNPR-ALDE government (2014–2015)
2012	2,331	0.03	0 / 412	2,171	0.03	0 / 176	9th	Extra-parliamentary opposition to the technocratic Cioloș Cabinet (2015–2017)
2016	24,580	0.35	0 / 329	32,808	0.47	0 / 136	11th	Extra-parliamentary support for PSD-ALDE government (2017–2019)
2016	24,580	0.35	0 / 329	32,808	0.47	0 / 136	11th	Extra-parliamentary opposition to PSD minority government (2019)
2016	24,580	0.35	0 / 329	32,808	0.47	0 / 136	11th	Extra-parliamentary opposition to PNL minority government (2019–2020)
2020	19,693	0.33	0 / 330	23,093	0.39	0 / 136	12th	Extra-parliamentary opposition to PNL-USR PLUS-UDMR government (2020–2021)
2020	19,693	0.33	0 / 330	23,093	0.39	0 / 136	12th	Extra-parliamentary opposition to PSD-PNL-UDMR government (2021–2023)
2020	19,693	0.33	0 / 330	23,093	0.39	0 / 136	12th	Extra-parliamentary opposition to PSD-PNL government (2023–2024)
2024	12,849	0.14	0 / 330	16,256	0.18	0 / 134	21st	Extra-parliamentary opposition to PSD-PNL-UDMR government (2024–2025)
2024	12,849	0.14	0 / 330	16,256	0.18	0 / 134	21st	Extra-parliamentary opposition to PSD-PNL-USR-UDMR government (2025–present)

=== Local elections ===
Election	County Councilors (CJ)			Mayors			Local Councilors (CL)			Popular vote	%	Position
Election	Votes	%	Seats	Votes	%	Seats	Votes	%	Seats	Popular vote	%	Position
2020	—N/a	—N/a	0 / 1,340	—N/a	—N/a	0 / 3,176	1,361	0.02	3 / 39,900	—N/a	—N/a	52nd
2024	—N/a	—N/a	0 / 1,340	—N/a	—N/a	0 / 3,176	3,007	0.04	2 / 39,900	—N/a	—N/a	59th

=== Presidential elections ===
Election	Candidate	First round			Second round		
Election	Candidate	Votes	Percentage	Position	Votes	Percentage	Position
2004	did not compete						
2009	Constantin Rotaru	43,684	0.45%	9th	not qualified		
2014	Constantin Rotaru	28,805	0.30%	13th	not qualified		
2019	did not compete						
2024	did not compete						

=== European elections ===
Election	Votes	Percentage	MEPs	Position	EU Party	EP Group
2007	28,484	0.55%	0 / 35	13th	PEL	—
2009	did not compete				PEL	—
2014	did not compete				PEL	—
2019	40,135	0.44%	0 / 32	14th	PEL	—
2024	37,119	0.42%	0 / 33	12th	PEL	—

== See also ==
- Communitarian Party of Romania
- Democracy and Solidarity Party
