= People's Action (Romania) =

People's Action Acțiunea Populară (AP)
- Last leader: Emil Constantinescu
- Founded: 2001
- Dissolved: April 2008
- Split from: Christian Democratic National Peasants' Party (PNȚCD)
- Merged into: National Liberal Party (PNL)
- Headquarters: Splaiul Independenței, nr. 17, bl. 101; Bucharest
- Ideology: Christian democracy
- Colours: Blue

Website
- www.actiunea.ro

The People's Action (Romanian: Acțiunea Populară; abbreviated AP) was a minor Romanian centre-right political party, founded and led by former President Emil Constantinescu. It had no seats in the Parliament of Romania nor in the European Parliament. In April 2008, it merged into the National Liberal Party (PNL).

== Electoral history ==
=== Legislative elections ===
Election	Chamber			Senate			Position	Aftermath
Election	Votes	%	Seats	Votes	%	Seats	Position	Aftermath
2004	48,152	0.47	0 / 332	52,487	0.51	0 / 137	11th	Extra-parliamentary support for DA-PUR-UDMR government (2004–2007)
2004	48,152	0.47	0 / 332	52,487	0.51	0 / 137	11th	Extra-parliamentary support for PNL-UDMR minority government (2007–2008)

=== Presidential elections ===
Election	Candidate	First round			Second round		
Election	Candidate	Votes	Percentage	Position	Votes	Percentage	Position
2004	Marian Petre Miluț	43,378	0.4%	9th	not qualified		
