= Romanian Socialist Party =

Romanian Socialist Party may refer to:

- Romanian Socialist Party (present-day), formerly known as Socialist Alliance Party
- Romanian Socialist Party (1992–2015)
- Socialist Party of Romania
