= Romeo Stavarache =

Romeo Stavarache is a chemical engineer and inventor who became mayor of Bacău, Romania in 2004, succeeding the powerful local politician Dumitru Sechelariu, who had been mayor since 1996.

In 2004, Stavarache was the leader of the Humanist Romanian Party (PUR) - Bacău chapter. The party he represented was allied, at that time, with the Social Democratic Party (PSD). In Bacău County, Stavarache defeated Sechelariu.

In August 2004, after having a disagreement with the national leader of PUR (Dan Voiculescu), Stavarache left his former political party for the national liberals. Late in December 2004, the national liberals, at that time allied with the democrats (PD) and other smaller political forces, forced PSD out of power and won a relative majority in the Parliament. In 2005, Stavarache won a much-contested local competition for the position of PNL leader - Bacău chapter. In 2009, Stavarache was elected vice-president of the National Liberal Party (PNL).

Romeo Stavarache, was arrested on June 26, 2014, by the National Anticorruption Agency (DNA) for 24 hours. He allegedly received bribes of over RON 2.3 million (some EUR 522,000) from several businessmen, according to a DNA press release.
