= National Union PSD+PUR =

Romanian electoral alliance

The National Union PSD+PUR (Romanian: Uniunea Națională PSD+PUR) was an electoral alliance in Romania in 2004.

== History ==
The alliance was formed between the Social Democratic Party (PSD) and the Humanist Party of Romania (PUR) as a counterpart to the Justice and Truth Alliance (DA; PNL-PD), only for the 2004 legislative elections and Romanian presidential election.

The two parties - by then PSD and Conservative Party (PC) - also decided to form a political alliance for the 2008 general elections, called Alliance PSD+PC, reflecting the Humanist Party's change of name.

== `Electoral history ==
=== Legislative elections ===
Election	Chamber			Senate			Position	Aftermath
Election	Votes	%	Seats	Votes	%	Seats	Position	Aftermath
2004	3,730,352	36.61	132 / 332	3,798,607	36.30	57 / 137	1st ^{1}	Alliance dismantled in December 2004; DA-PUR^{2}-UDMR (until April 2007); PSD in opposition
2004	3,730,352	36.61	132 / 332	3,798,607	36.30	57 / 137	1st ^{1}	PSD supported a minority PNL-UDMR government PC in opposition
2008	2,279,449	33.10	114 / 334	2,352,968	34.16	49 / 137	2nd (as PSD+PC)^{3}	PDL-PSD government (until December 2009); PC in opposition
2008	2,279,449	33.10	114 / 334	2,352,968	34.16	49 / 137	2nd (as PSD+PC)^{3}	Opposition to PDL-UNPR-UDMR (until May 2012)
2008	2,279,449	33.10	114 / 334	2,352,968	34.16	49 / 137	2nd (as PSD+PC)^{3}	USL government (until December 2012)

Notes:

^{1} National Union PSD+PUR members: PSD (46 senators and 113 deputies) and PUR (11 senators and 19 deputies).
^{2} Soon after the elections, PUR broke the alliance and switched sides, joining Justice and Truth Alliance (DA).
^{3} Alliance PSD+PC members: PSD (48 senators and 110 deputies) and PC (1 senator and 4 deputies).

=== Presidential elections ===
Election	Candidate	First round			Second round		
Election	Candidate	Votes	Percentage	Position	Votes	Percentage	Position
2004	Adrian Năstase	4,278,864	40.9%	1st	4,881,520	48.8%	2nd
