= 2009 European Parliament election in Romania =

- 7 June 2009

All 33 seats of Romania in the European Parliament
- Turnout: 27.67%
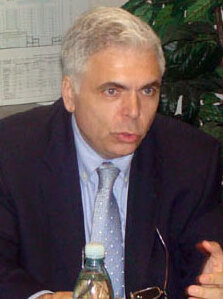

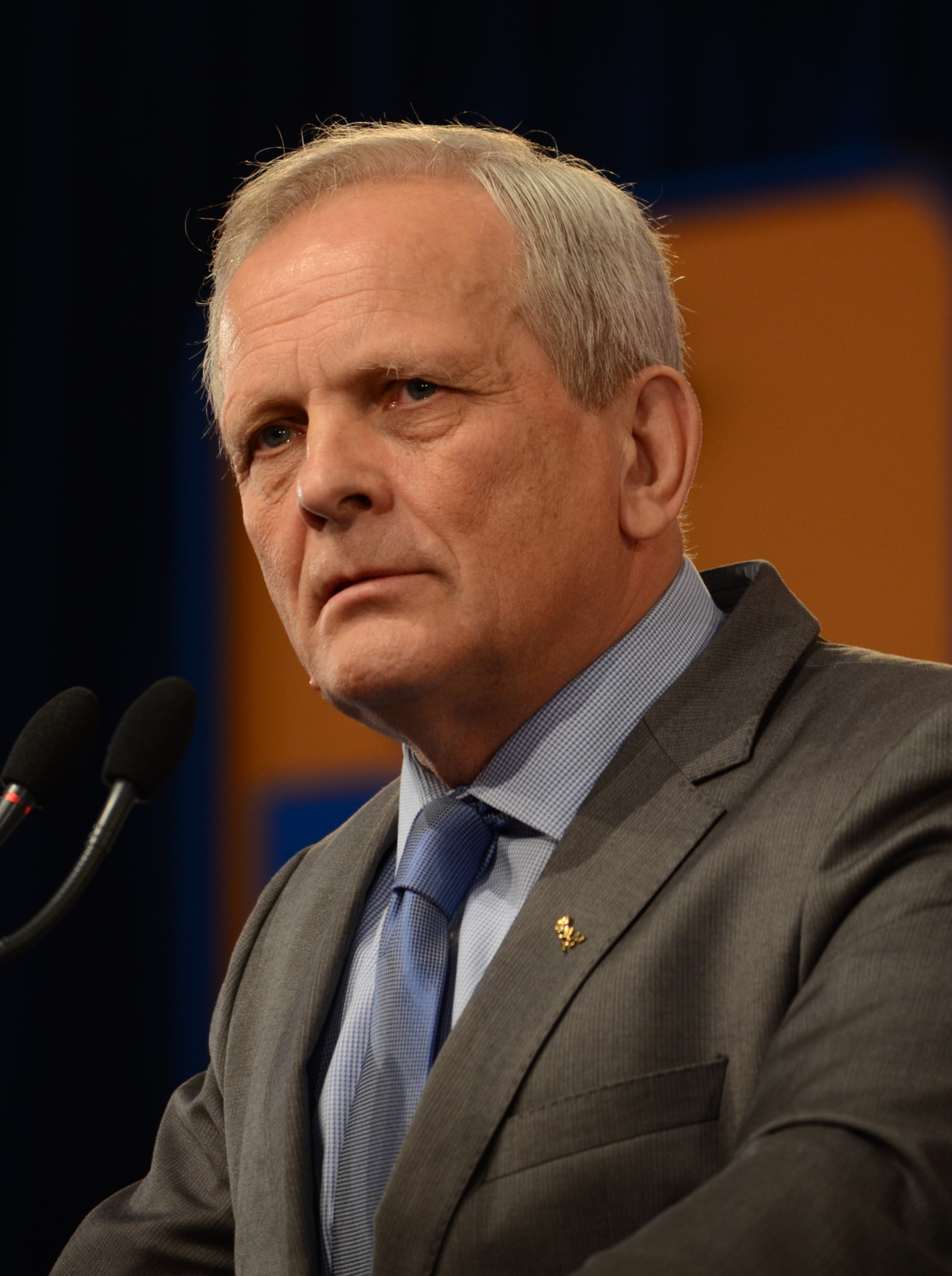

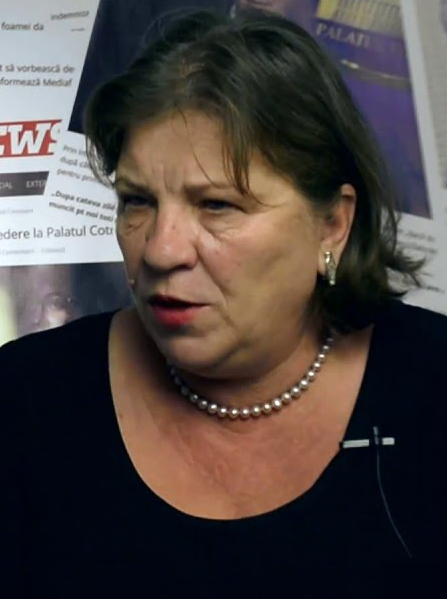

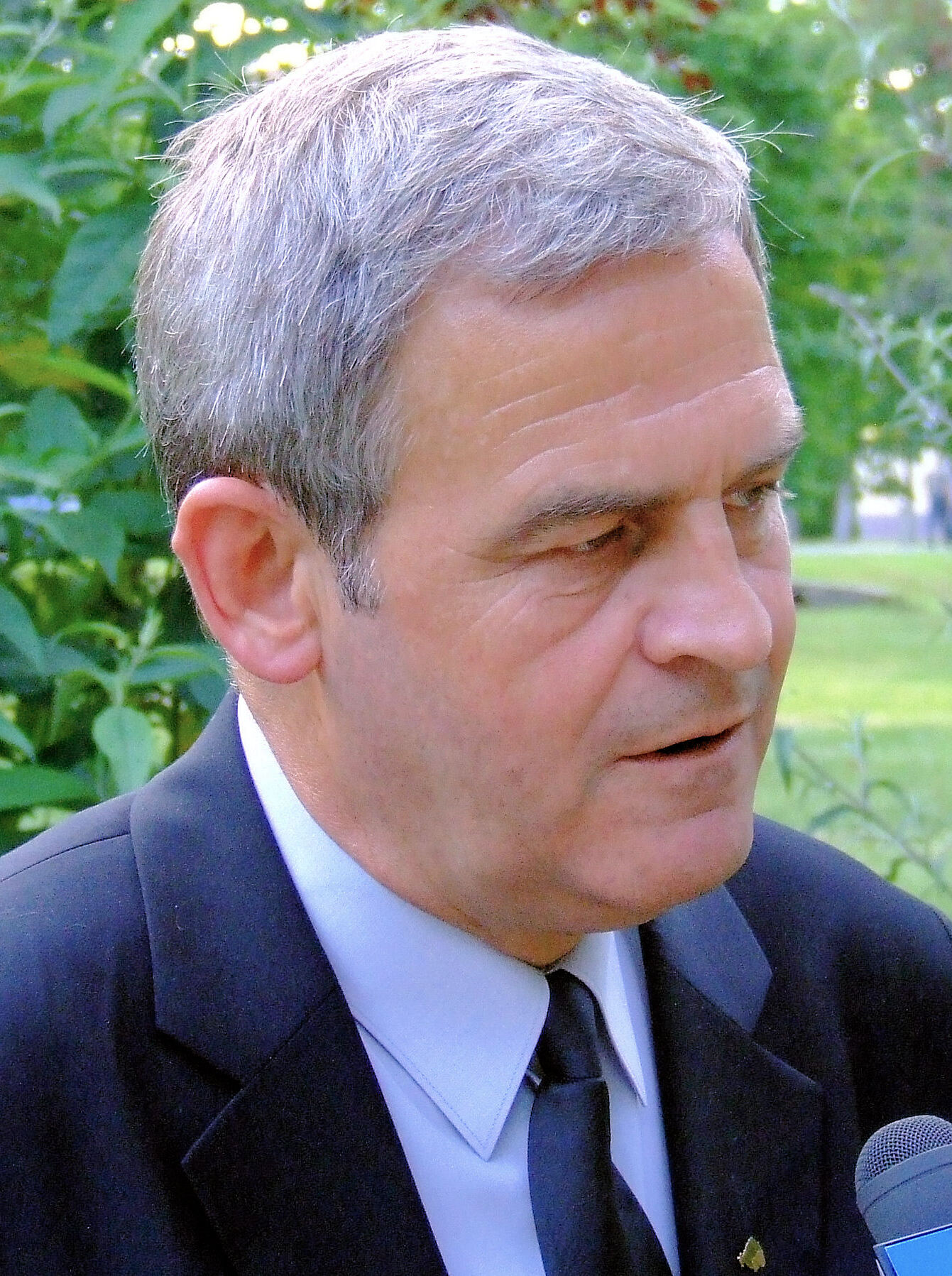

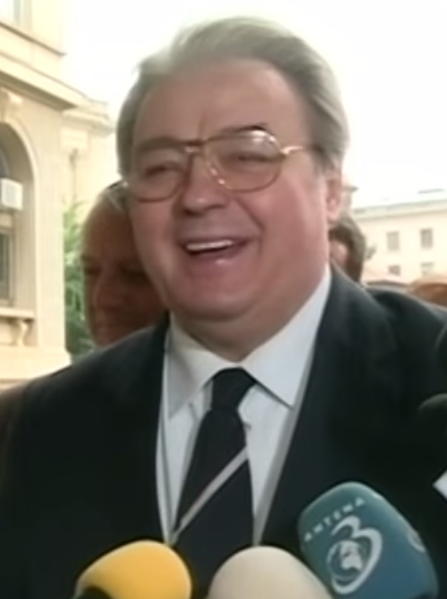
	First party	Second party	Third party
Leader	Adrian Severin	Theodor Stolojan	Norica Nicolai
Party	PSD+PC	PDL	PNL
Last election	10 seats	16 seats	6 seats
Seats won	11	10	5
Seat change	▲1	▼6	▼1
Popular vote	1,504,218	1,438,000	702,974
Percentage	31.07%	29.71%	14.52%
EP Group	PES	EPP-ED	ALDE
	Fourth party	Fifth party
Leader	László Tőkés	Corneliu Vadim Tudor
Party	UDMR	PRM
Last election	2 seats	0 seats
Seats won	3	3
Seat change	▲1	▲3
Popular vote	431,739	419,094
Percentage	8.92%	8.66%
EP Group	EPP-ED

The 2009 European Parliament election in Romania was the election of the delegation from Romania to the European Parliament in 2009.

== Candidates and elected MEPs ==
Among those expected to take up seats are (listed in the order they appear on the ballot):

For the Alliance PSD+PC (electoral alliance of PSD + PC):

1. Adrian Severin, 55 years old
2. Rovana Plumb, 49 years old
3. Ioan-Mircea Paşcu, 60 years old
4. Silvia Adriana Ţicău, 39 years old
5. Daciana-Octavia Sârbu, 32 years old
6. Corina Creţu, 32 years old
7. Victor Boştinaru, 57 years old
8. Sabin Cutaş, 41 years old, the only one from PC
9. Cătălin Ivan, 31 years old
10. Ioan Enciu, 56 years old, and
11. Vasilica Dăncilă, 46 years old

For the Democratic Liberal Party (PDL):

1. Theodor Stolojan, 66 years old
2. Monica Macovei, 50 years old
3. Traian Ungureanu, 51 years old
4. Cristian Preda, 43 years old
5. Marian-Jean Marinescu, 57 years old
6. Iosif Matula, 51 years old
7. Sebastian Bodu, 39 years old
8. Petru Luhan, 32 years old
9. Rareş Niculescu, 33 years old
10. Oana Antonescu, 30 years old, and
11. Elena Băsescu, 29 years old; ran separately as an independent.

For the National Liberal Party (PNL):

1. Norica Nicolai, 51 years old
2. Adina Vălean, 41 years old
3. Renate Weber, 54 years old
4. Ramona Mănescu, 37 years old, and
5. Cristian Buşoi, 31 years old

For the Democratic Alliance of Hungarians in Romania (UDMR):

1. László Tőkés, 57 years old
2. Iuliu Winkler, 45 years old, and
3. Csaba Sógor, 45 years old

For the Greater Romania Party (PRM):

1. Corneliu Vadim Tudor, 60 years old,
2. Gigi Becali, 51 years old, and
3. Claudiu Ciprian Tănăsescu, 44 years old

The other three electoral candidates did not pass the threshold:

- Christian Democratic National Peasants' Party, led by Marian Petre Miluţ;
- Civic Force, led by Adrian-Ştefan Iuraşcu;
- Pavel Abraham as an independent candidate.

== Opinion polls ==
Polling Firm	Date	Source	PDL	PSD – PC	PNL	PNG	PRM	UDMR	Elena Băsescu	Others	Undecided
Insomar	26/03-05/04/2009		33%	31%	15%	2%	5%	7%	6%	1%	—N/a
BCS	6-14/04/2009		32,6%	26,6%	17,7%	—N/a	6,8%	5,5%	4,4%	—N/a	—N/a
CURS	8-16/04/2009		26%	30%	19%	—N/a	7%	7%	4%	—N/a	—N/a
CCSB	18-22/04/2009	,	31%	30%	16%	—N/a	8%	5%	8%	—N/a	—N/a
CSOP	24-27/04/2009		35%	31%	16%	—N/a	6%	7%	4%	1%	—N/a
GSS	3-5/05/2009		29.6%	31.1%	16.6%	4.5%	4.8%	5.9%	3%	3%	—N/a
Insomar	30/04-05/05/2009		30,8%	30,9%	18%	—N/a	6,2%	7,9%	4,2%	—N/a	—N/a
Gallup	5-9/05/2009		31%	31%	21%	4%	6%	5%	—N/a	2%	—N/a

== Results ==
Map of results: the party with a plurality of votes in each county PSD PDL UDMR

The European Parliament election results confirmed the tendency towards a two-party system. While country-wide each of the two parties has won slightly less than 1/3 of the votes (in the end each got 1/3 of the seats in the EP), the two became the main political contestants in almost every county. Discounting the votes received by Elena Băsescu who afterwards re-joined PDL, PSD won the first place in 17 counties (with PDL arriving second in all of them), and PDL won the first place in 18 counties (with PSD arriving second in all of them but one).

UDMR, fourth-largest party country-wide, won the first place in six counties, trailed in the second place five times by PSD, and one time by PDL. PNL, the third largest party country-wide rose above that level only in Ilfov County, where it obtained the second place after PDL. PRM, the fifth party, was unable to arrive first or second in any of Romania's counties.

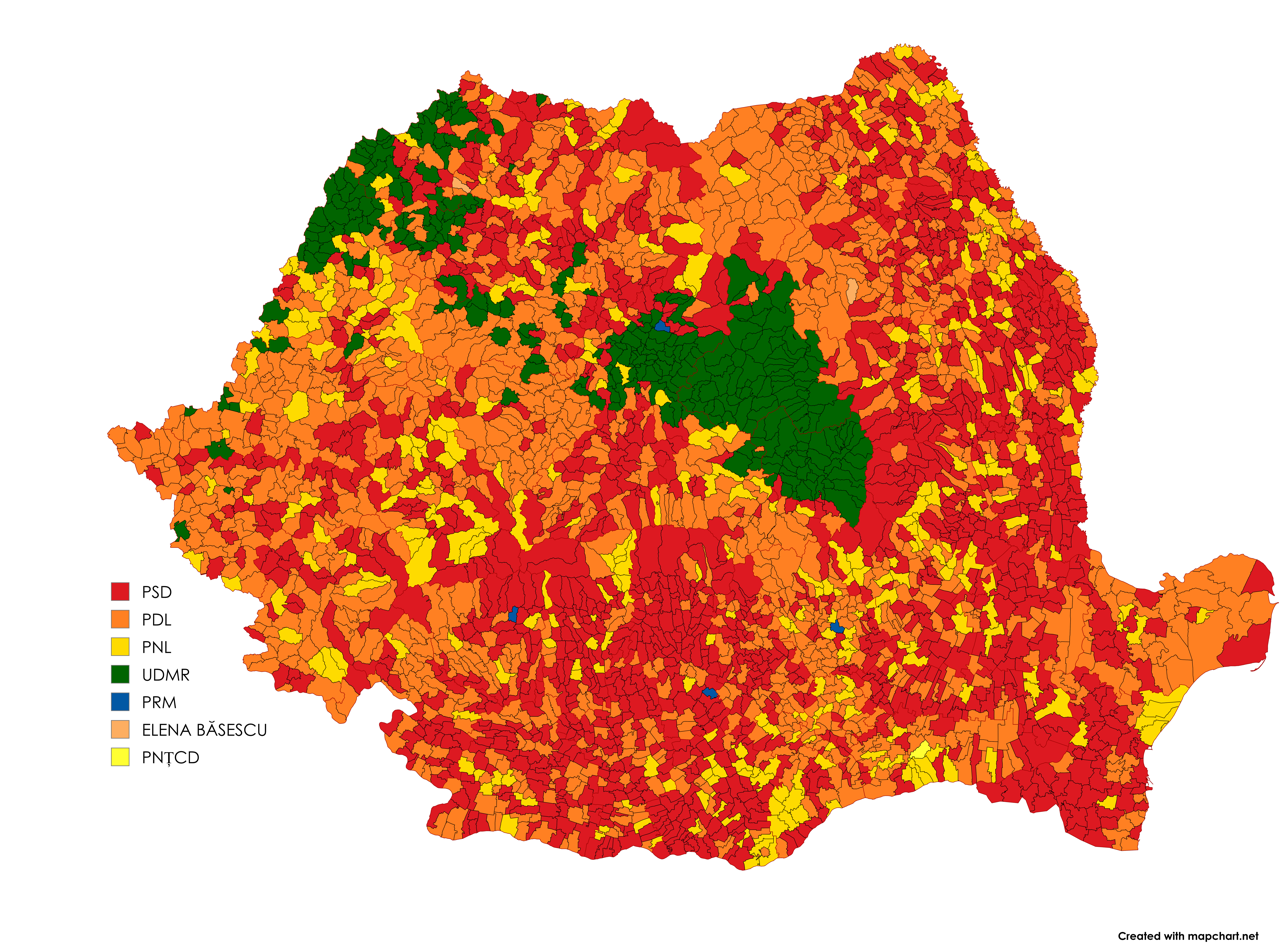
Map of results: the party with a plurality of votes in each locality

Party	Votes	%	Seats	+/–
Alliance PSD+PC	1,504,218	31.08	11	+1
Democratic Liberal Party	1,438,000	29.71	10	–6
National Liberal Party	702,974	14.52	5	–1
Democratic Alliance of Hungarians in Romania	431,739	8.92	3	+1
Greater Romania Party	419,094	8.66	3	+3
Christian Democratic National Peasants' Party	70,428	1.46	0	0
Civic Force	19,436	0.40	0	New
Independents	254,144	5.25	1	0
Total	4,840,033	100.00	33	–2
Valid votes	4,840,033	96.13		
Invalid/blank votes	194,626	3.87		
Total votes	5,034,659	100.00		
Registered voters/turnout	18,197,316	27.67		
Source: ROAEP

=== By county ===
PSD first, PDL second:	UDMR first, PSD or PDL second:	PDL first, PSD second:
Argeș (PSD 41.42%, PDL 26%)	Bihor (UDMR 27.53%, PDL 23.66%)	Arad (PDL 40.96%, PSD 21.09%)
Bacău (PSD 31.88%, PDL 29.15%)	Covasna (UDMR 82.41%, PSD 6.19%)	Alba (PDL 44.45%, PSD 22.35%)
Brăila (PSD 40.95%, PDL 24.32%)	Harghita (UDMR 89.4%, PSD 3.4%)	Bistrița-Năsăud (PDL 37.02%, PSD 34.86%)
Constanța (PSD 34.64%, PDL 27.83%)	Mureș (UDMR 49.30%, PSD 15.70%)	Botoșani (PDL 33.40%, PSD 32.63%)
Dâmbovița (PSD 43.01%, PDL 36.23%)	Satu Mare (UDMR 39.64%, PSD 20.61%)	Brașov (PDL 33.33%, PSD 22.61%)
Dolj (PSD 39.20%, PDL 36.56%)	Sălaj (UDMR 29.55%, PSD 25.34%)	Buzău (PDL 33.3%, PSD 31.9%)
Galați (PSD 42.44%, PDL 26.95%)		Caraș-Severin (PDL 35.26%, PSD 29.86%)
Gorj (PSD 34.26%, PDL 30.55%)	PDL first, PNL or UDMR second:	Călărași (PDL 29.3%, PSD 27.9%)
Hunedoara (PSD 28.56%, PDL 21.73%)	Ilfov (PDL 40.32%, PNL 23.91%)	Giurgiu (PDL 39.8%, PSD 27.2%)
Ialomița (PSD 44.8%, PDL 28.4%)	Cluj (PDL 31.01%, UDMR 22.51%)	Maramureș (PDL 29.52%, PSD 25.24%)
Iași (PSD 37.63%, PDL 25.20%)		Neamț (PDL 41.91%, PSD 32%)
Mehedinți (PSD 37.03%, PDL 35.60%)		Prahova (PDL 36.77%, PSD 24.59%)
Olt (PSD 47.59%, PDL 32.16%)		Sibiu (PDL 33.93%, PSD 32.06%)
Teleorman (PSD 51.68%, PDL 22.27%)		Suceava (PDL 39.50%, PSD 28.81%)
Vaslui (PSD 45.80%, PDL 21.25%)		Timiș (PDL 38.32%, PSD 27%)
Vâlcea (PSD 39.56%, PDL 25.27%)		Tulcea (PDL 39.1%, PSD 28.8%)
Vrancea (PSD 48.47%, PDL 21.24%)

In the capital city of Bucharest, PDL won with 28.28% of the votes, with PSD in second with 27.87%. Four of the six sectors of the city were won by PDL and two by PSD, with the other party in second place:

PSD first, PDL second	PDL first, PSD second
4th Sector (PSD 29.94%, PDL 28.61%)	1st Sector (PDL 28.28%, PSD 26.49%)
5th Sector (PSD 38.55%, PDL 22.16%)	2nd Sector (PDL 30.62%, PSD 25.21%)
	3rd Sector (PDL 30.62%, PSD 23.90%)
	6th Sector (PDL 38.11%, PSD 25.68%)
