= Communitarian Party of Romania =

Communitarian Party of Romania Partidul Comunitar din România
- Leader: Petre Ignătencu
- Founded: 19 March 2010; 16 years ago
- Registered: 2015
- Dissolved: 2022; 4 years ago
- Newspaper: Scînteia
- Ideology: Communism; Anti-Imperialism; Anti-Americanism; Anti-Capitalism
- Political position: Far-left
- Colours: red
- Chamber of Deputies: 0 / 460
- Senate: 0 / 100
- Seats in the European Parliament: 0 / 32

Website
- partidulcomunitar.ro

The Communitarian Party of Romania (Romanian: Partidul Comunitar din România, PCDR) was a political party in Romania. The leader of the party was Petre Ignătencu. Though not openly communist, the party unofficially claimed to be the successor of the Romanian Communist Party, often using its symbology during party actions. The party also claimed that the Socialist Alliance Party (now the Romanian Socialist Party), another organisation claiming the legacy of the Communist Party, is a pseudo-communist party.

It was dissolved in 2022.

== History ==
On 19 March 2010, the Committee for the Reorganization of the Romanian Communist Party was formed. The committee proclaimed the founding of the New Romanian Communist Party (NPCR, officially PCR). The congress of the committee elected the taxi driver Petre Ignătencu as president of the new party. In 2012, NPCR officials submitted a request to register the Communist Party. On 21 February 2013, in a press conference, the communist leaders announced that the Bucharest Tribunal rejected the request to register PCR as a political party, but they said that will not stop the process for the official recognition of the party. The party was ultimately registered in 2015 using the current name, after dropping all reference to communism from party documents.

== President ==
Year	Name	Period	Time in office
2010	Petre Ignătencu	2010–2022	c. 12 years
