= Sabin Cutaș =

Romanian politician

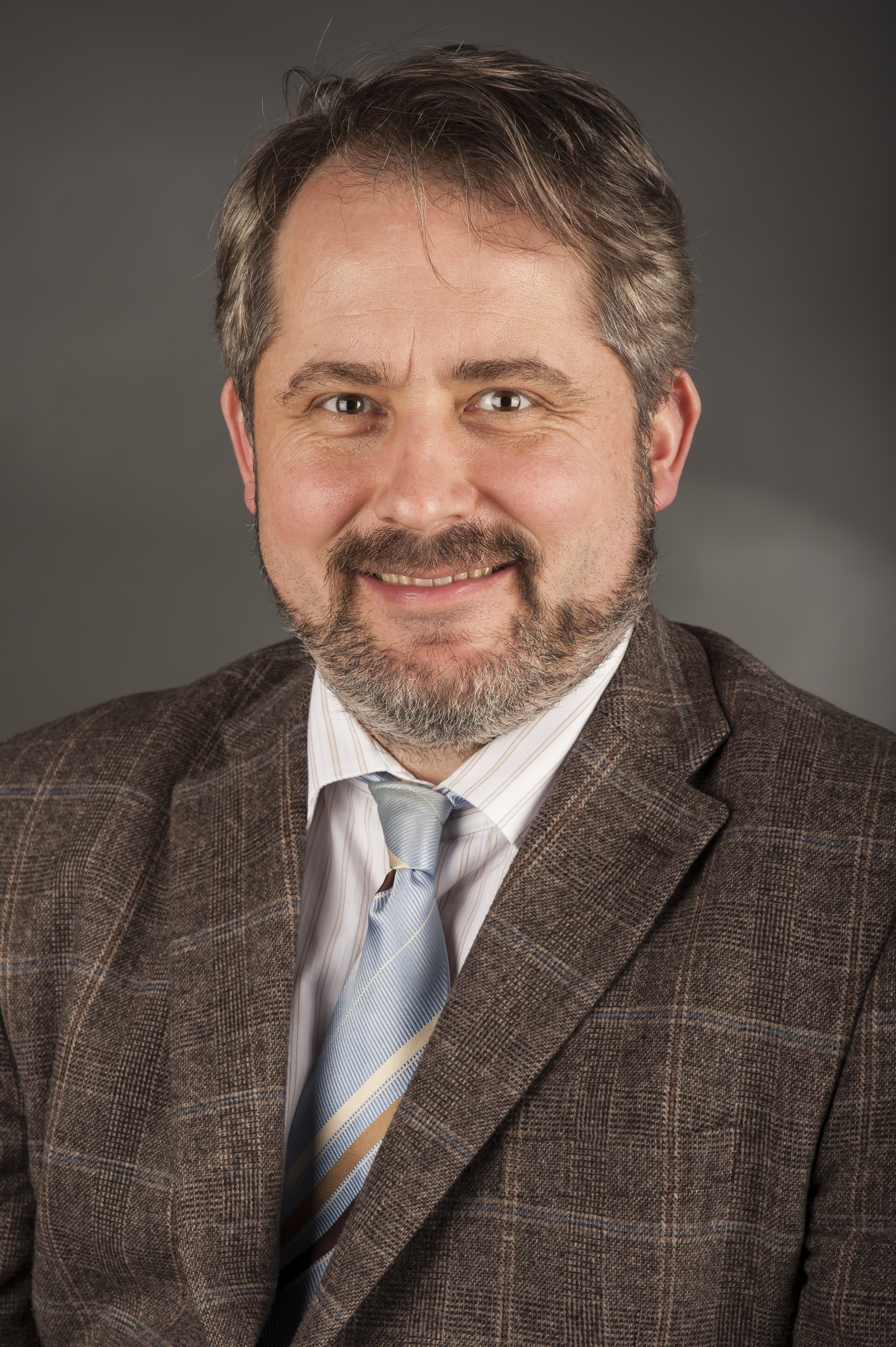
Sabin Cutaș in 2014

George Sabin Cutaş (born February 23, 1968) is a Romanian politician. A member of the Conservative Party (PC), he sat in the Romanian Senate from 2004 to 2008 representing Teleorman County, and represented Romania in the European Parliament from 2009 to 2014.

Born in Bacău, Bacău County, Socialist Republic of Romania Cutaş attended the Aerospace Engineering faculty of the Politehnica University of Bucharest from 1987 to 1992. Between 1995 and 2004, he held a number of positions at Dan Voiculescu-owned companies, including Grivco, Antena 1 (which he headed from 1999 to 2004), and Intact Media Group (director from 2003 to 2004). A member of the Voiculescu-founded PC, he served a term in the Senate, where he led the PC parliamentary caucus in his last year there and twice served as one of the body's vice presidents. He was, at various points, on the economics, foreign policy, and culture committees. Elected to the European Parliament in 2009, he sat on the Committee on Economic and Monetary Affairs.

He is married and has two children.
