= 2004 Romanian general election =

- Presidential election
- 28 November 2004 (first round); 12 December 2004 (second round)
- Turnout: 58.49% (first round) ▼6.82pp 55.21% (second round) ▼2.29pp
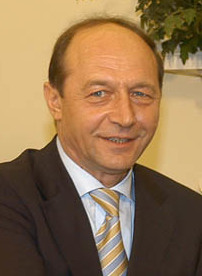

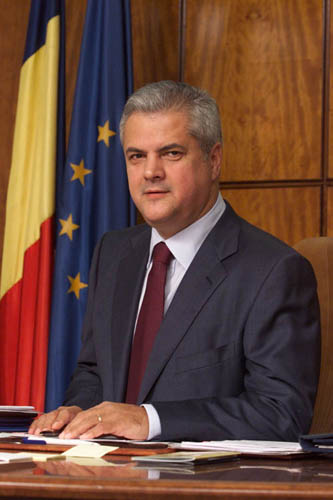
Nominee	Traian Băsescu	Adrian Năstase
Party	PD	PSD
Alliance	DA	PSD+PUR
Popular vote	5,126,794	4,881,520
Percentage	51.23%	48.77%
- Băsescu: 30–40% 40–50% 50–60% 60–70% Năstase: 30–40% 40–50% 50–60% 60–70% 70–80% Markó: 30–40% 60–70% 70–80%
President before election
Ion Iliescu
Independent
Elected President
Traian Băsescu
PD
- Chamber of Deputies
- 28 November 2004
- All 332 seats in the Chamber of Deputies
- Turnout: 58.47%
Party	Leader	Vote %	Seats	+/–
PSD+PUR	Adrian Năstase	36.61	132	−23
DA	Traian Băsescu; Călin Popescu-Tăriceanu	31.33	112	+51
PRM	Corneliu Vadim Tudor	12.92	48	−36
UDMR	Béla Markó	6.17	22	−5
Minority parties	Varujan Pambuccian (Note: Pambuccian, a member of the Union of Armenians of Romania, has been the parliamentary leader of the national minorities' group since 1996.)	2.17	18	0
This lists parties that won seats. See the complete results below.
- Senate
- 28 November 2004
- All 137 seats in the Senate
- Turnout: 58.47%
Party	Leader	Vote %	Seats	+/–
PSD+PUR	Adrian Năstase	37.13	57	−8
DA	Traian Băsescu; Călin Popescu-Tăriceanu	31.77	49	+23
PRM	Corneliu Vadim Tudor	13.63	21	−16
UDMR	Béla Markó	6.23	10	−2
This lists parties that won seats. See the complete results below.
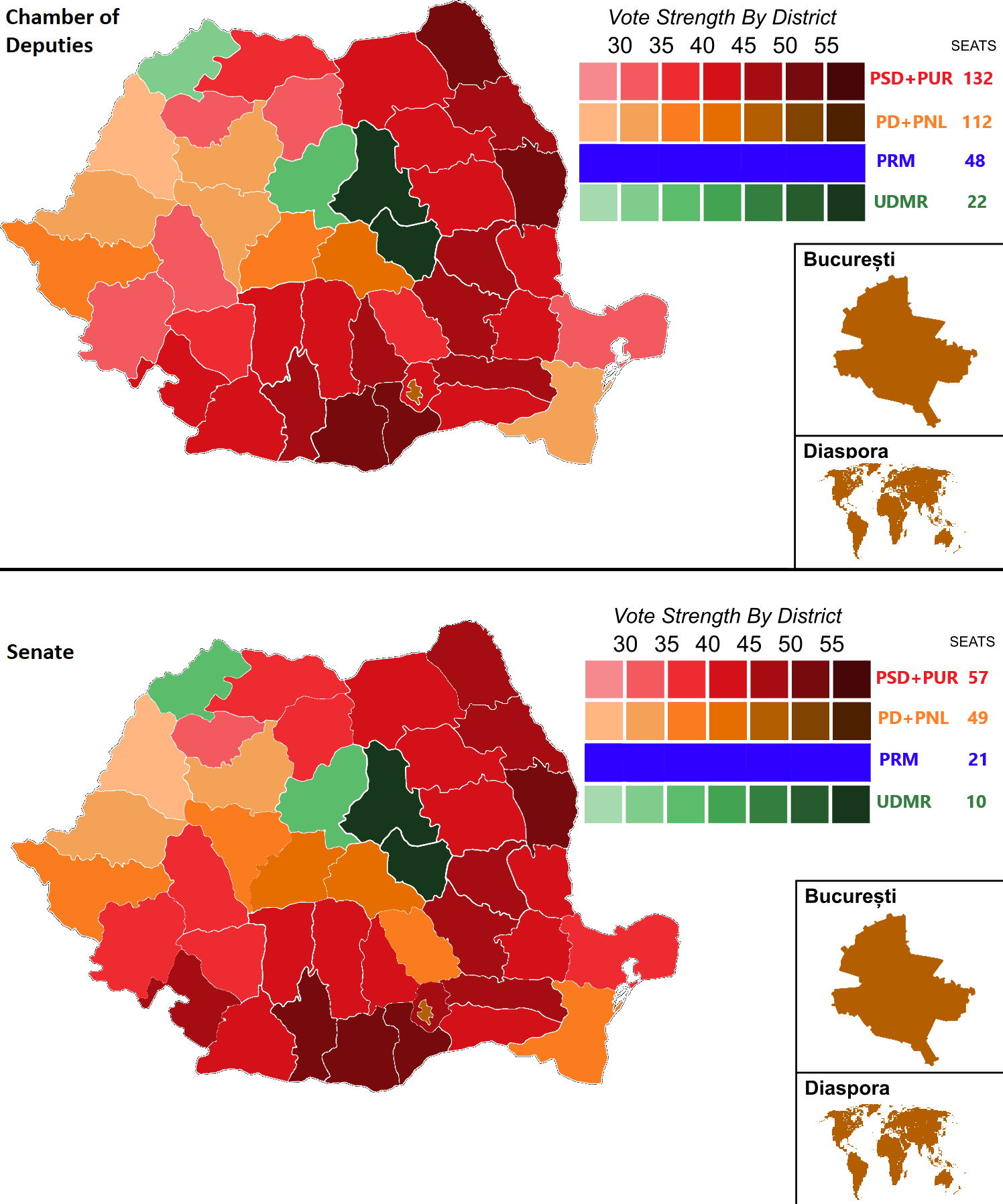
Results for the Chamber of Deputies and Senate
Prime Minister before	Prime Minister-designate
Adrian Năstase; PSD	Călin Popescu-Tăriceanu; PNL (DA)

General elections were held in Romania on 28 November 2004, with a second round of the presidential elections on 12 December between former Prime Minister Adrian Năstase of the then ruling Social Democratic Party (PSD) and then incumbent Bucharest Mayor Traian Băsescu of the opposition Justice and Truth Alliance (DA), more specifically of the Democratic Party (PD). Băsescu was elected President by a narrow majority of just 51.2%. The 2004 presidential election was the fifth of its kind held in post-1989 Romania.

Following 2003 amendments to the constitution which lengthened the presidential term to five years, these were the last joint elections to the presidency and Parliament in Romania's political history thus far.

== Campaign ==
=== Parliamentary elections ===
The main contenders were the left-wing alliance made up of the then incumbent Social Democratic Party of Romania (PSD) and the Romanian Humanist Party (PUR), and, on the other hand, the center-right Justice and Truth Alliance (DA; Romanian: Dreptate și adevăr) comprising the conservative-liberal National Liberal Party (PNL) and the initially social-democratic Democratic Party (PD) which later adopted a center-right Christian democratic ideology.

Other significant contenders were the Greater Romania Party (PRM) (right-wing nationalists), the ethnic Hungarian party Democratic Alliance of Hungarians in Romania (UDMR), and the Union for Romanian Reconstruction (UPRR), a group of right-wing technocrats.

== Conduct ==
The opposition alleged fraudulent use by the PSD of "supplementary lists", designed to help Romanians in transit to vote. Traditionally, Romanians voted with a cardboard identity card, which was stamped when they voted. Most Romanians now have laminated plastic IDs, to which a printed stamp is affixed when a person votes. However, the stamps can be easily removed. In spite of this, electoral fraud is nearly impossible to commit, as every citizen is assigned to one local voting station, the only location he/she can vote at.

The opposition claimed that there were organized "electoral excursions" of PSD supporters who were bussed to various towns to vote several times. This was corroborated by several teams of journalists, who followed the buses.

The government attacked the opposition by arguing that 'rumours of fraud' affect Romania's economy and its external credibility.

In January 2005, the IMAS institute of statistics released an analysis of the voting results in the 16,824 precincts. In the top 1,000 precincts with the most votes on the supplementary lists, the PSD had 43% to the DA's 23%, while in the precincts with fewest votes on supplementary lists, the PSD had 30% to the DA's 34%. The same trend was true in the precincts with most void votes. Wayback Machine

== Presidential candidates ==
Name	Lifespan	Public Administration Experience	Affiliation and endorsements	Alma mater and profession	Candidacy Announcement dates
Traian Băsescu	Born: November 4, 1951 (age 53); Basarabi, Constanța County	Mayor of Bucharest (2000-election day); Deputy (1992–2000); Minister of Transport (1991–1992, 1996–1998, 1998–2000); Sub-Secretary of State for Naval Transportation with the Ministry of Transport (1990–1991); Director of Civil Navigation Inspectorate with the Ministry of Transport (1989–1990)	Affiliation: Justice and Truth Alliance; Alliance members: PNL and PD	Mircea cel Bătrân Naval Academy (1976) seaman	
Adrian Năstase	Born: June 22, 1950 (age 54); Bucharest	Prime Minister of Romania (2000-election day); Deputy (1990, 1992-election day); President of the Chamber of Deputies (1992–1996); Minister of Foreign Affairs (1990–1992)	Affiliation: National Union PSD+PUR; Alliance members: PSD and PUR	Faculty of Sociology, University of Bucharest (1978); Faculty of Law, University of Bucharest (1973) jurist	
Corneliu Vadim Tudor	Born: November 28, 1949 (age 55); Bucharest; Died: September 14, 2015, Bucharest	Senator (1992-election day) Former presidential elections: 2000: 28.3% (2nd place, 1st round), 33.2% (2nd place, 2nd round); 1996: 4.7% (5th place, 1st round)	Affiliation: PRM	Faculty of Philosophy, University of Bucharest (1971) journalist, writer	
Béla Markó	Born: September 8, 1951 (age 53); Târgu Secuiesc, Covasna County	Senator (1990-election day)	Affiliation: UDMR	Faculty of Philology, Babeş-Bolyai University, Cluj-Napoca (1974) journalist, poet	
Gheorghe Ciuhandu	Born: June 15, 1947 (age 57); Timișoara, Timiș County	Mayor of Timișoara (1996-election day)	Affiliation: PNȚCD	Faculty of Constructions, Politehnica University of Timișoara (1970) building engineer	
Gigi Becali	Born: June 25, 1958 (age 46); Vădeni, Brăila County		Affiliation: PNG	"Iuliu Maniu" High-school, Bucharest (1978) shepherd, football club owner	
Petre Roman	Born: July 22, 1946 (age 58); Bucharest	Senator (1996-election day); Minister of Foreign Affairs (1999–2000); President of the Senate of Romania (1996–1999); Deputy (1990–1996); Prime Minister of Romania (1989–1991) Former presidential elections: 2000: 3.0% (6th place, 1st round); 1996: 20.5% (3rd place, 1st round)	Affiliation: Democratic Force	Faculty of Energy, Politehnica University of Bucharest (1968) hydroelectric powerplant engineer	
Gheorghe Dinu	Born: unknown birthdate unknown birthplace		Affiliation: none	unknown education intelligence officer	
Marian Petre Miluț	Born: December 29, 1955 (age 48); Craiova, Dolj County		Affiliation: People's Action	Faculty of Automation, Computers and Electronics, University of Craiova (1980) IT engineer	
Ovidiu Tudorici	Born: October 16, 1969 (age 35); Câmpulung Moldovenesc, Suceava County	Deputy Mayor of Câmpulung Moldovenesc (2004-election day)	Affiliation: Union for Romania's Reconstruction	Faculty of Law, Petre Andrei University of Iași (1997) salesman, marketing specialist	
Aurel Rădulescu	Born: August 13, 1953 (age 51); Adamclisi, Constanța County		Affiliation: Christian Democratic People's Alliance	Faculty of Law and Faculty of Theology, unknown universities (unknown years) priest	
Raj Tunaru	Born: November 12, 1959 (age 45); Țânțăreni, Gorj County		Affiliation: Democratic Youth Party	University of Petroșani (unknown year) mining engineer	

== Results ==
=== President ===
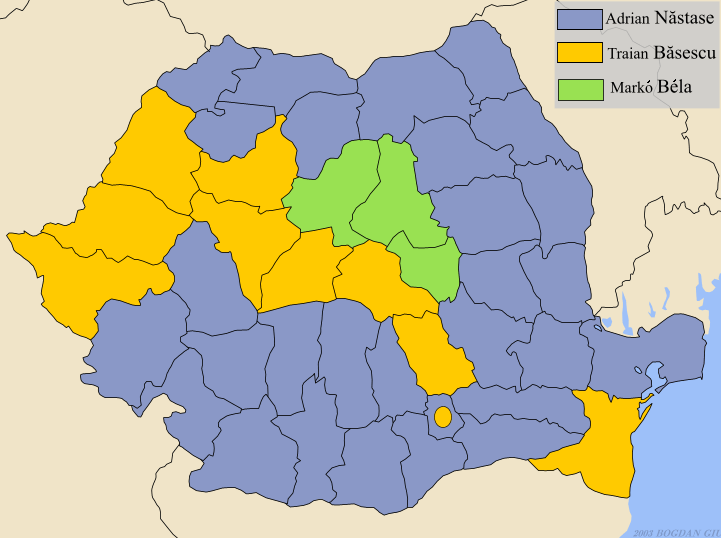
Winner by county in the first round

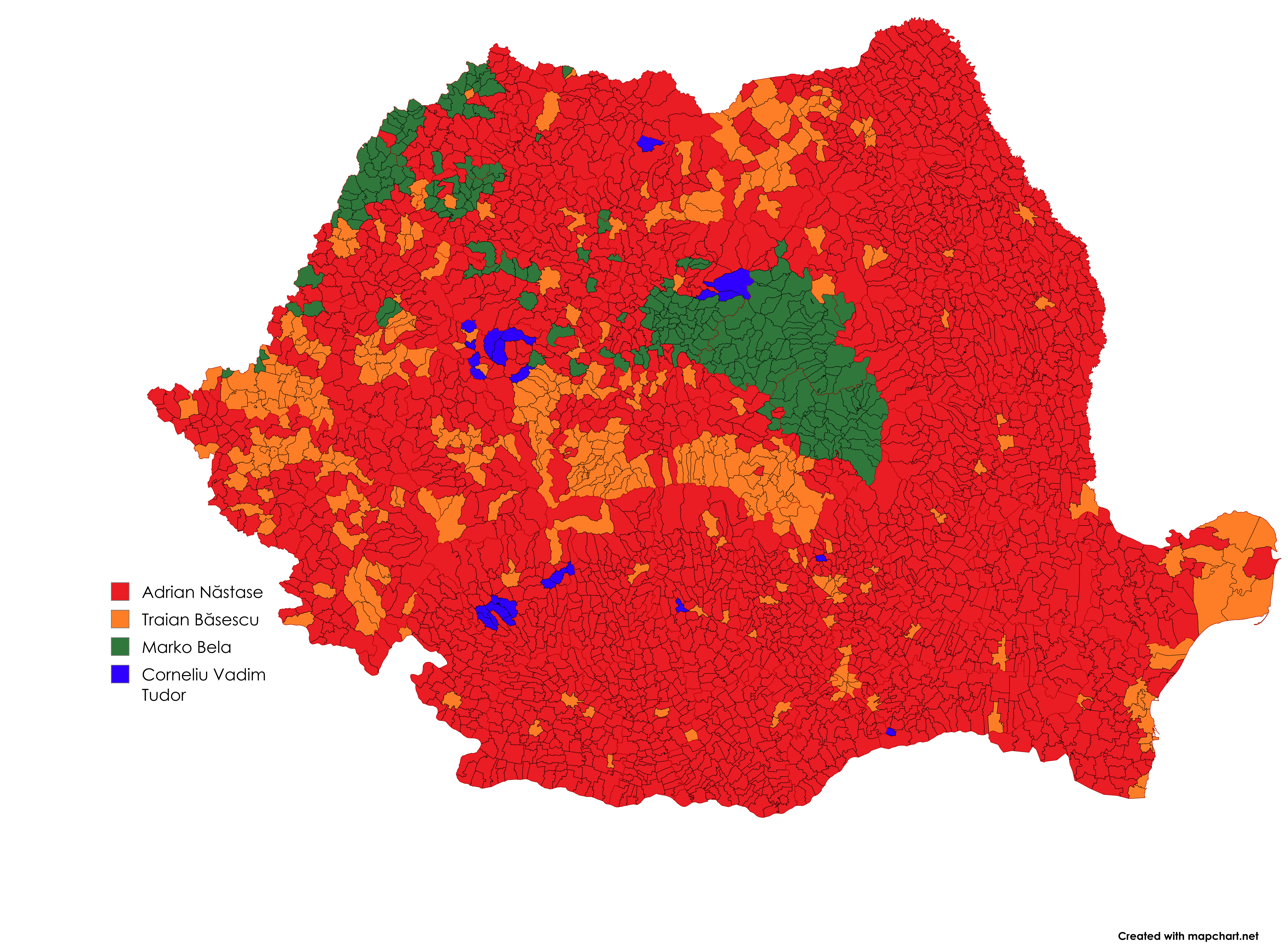
First round result by commune

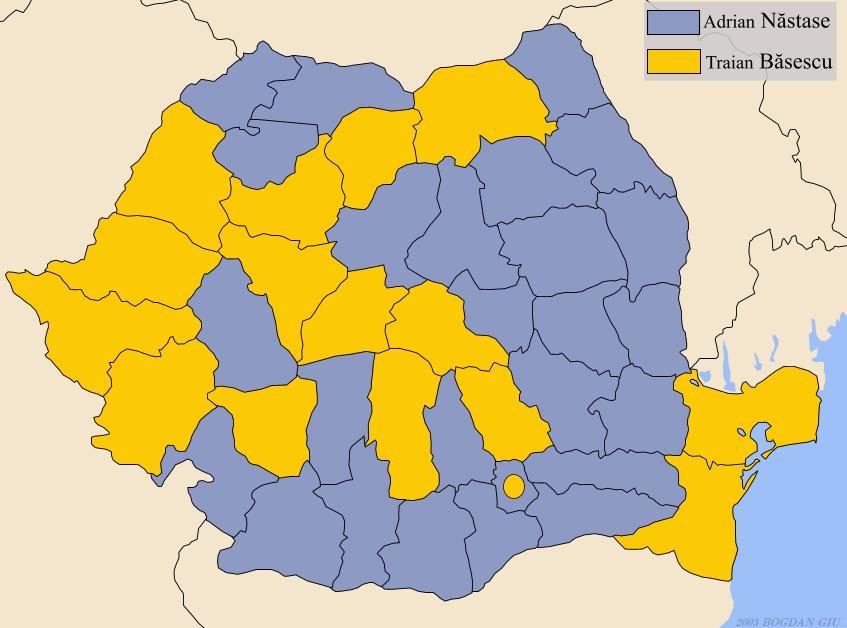
Winner by county in the runoff

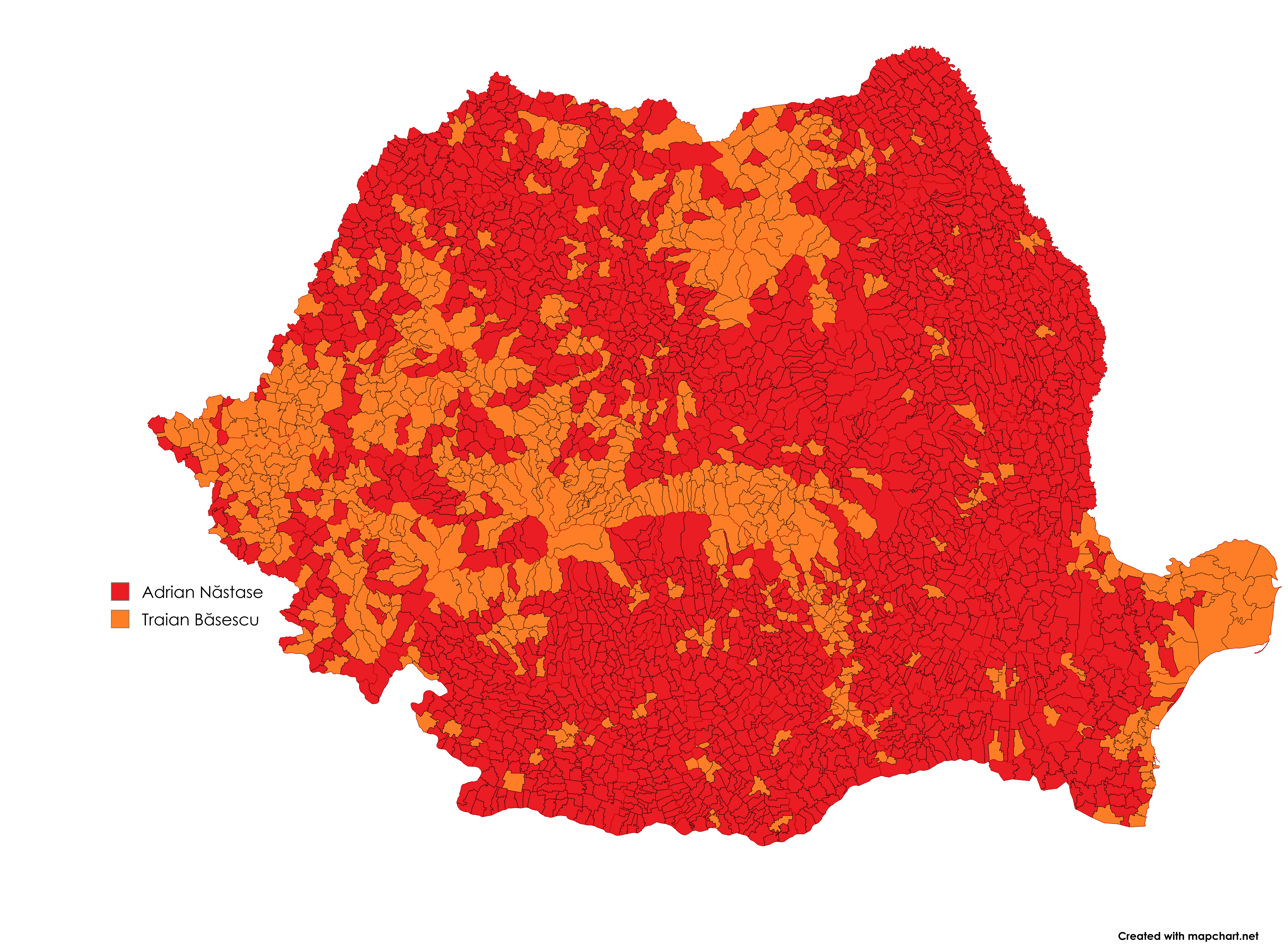
Second round results by commune

Corneliu Vadim Tudor positioned himself against Băsescu, without openly endorsing Năstase. Marko Bela openly endorsed Adrian Năstase. Gheorghe Ciuhandu openly endorsed Băsescu.

Both Băsescu and Năstase came from left-wing parties (PD and PSD) that were members of Socialist International (SI). However, SI supported Năstase, which led to the abandonment of the social-democratic doctrine by the PD and the withdrawal of the party from SI in 2005.

Candidate	Party	First round		Second round	
Candidate	Party	Votes	%	Votes	%
Traian Băsescu	Justice and Truth Alliance	3,545,236	33.92	5,126,794	51.23
Adrian Năstase	National Union PSD+PUR	4,278,864	40.94	4,881,520	48.77
Corneliu Vadim Tudor	Greater Romania Party	1,313,714	12.57		
Béla Markó	Democratic Alliance of Hungarians in Romania	533,446	5.10		
Gheorghe Ciuhandu	Christian Democratic National Peasants' Party	198,394	1.90		
Gigi Becali	New Generation Party	184,560	1.77		
Petre Roman	Democratic Force	140,702	1.35		
Gheorghe Dinu	Independent	113,321	1.08		
Marian Petre Miluț	People's Action	43,378	0.42		
Ovidiu Tudorici	Union for Romanian Reconstruction	37,910	0.36		
Aurel Rădulescu	Christian Democratic People's Alliance	35,455	0.34		
Alexandru Raj Tunaru	Democratic Youth Party	27,225	0.26		
Total		10,452,205	100.00	10,008,314	100.00
Valid votes		10,452,205	96.86	10,008,314	98.98
Invalid/blank votes		339,010	3.14	103,245	1.02
Total votes		10,791,215	100.00	10,111,559	100.00
Registered voters/turnout		18,449,344	58.49	18,316,104	55.21
Source: Nohlen & Stöver

Vote share
Second round
Băsescu	51.23%
Năstase	48.77%
First round
Năstase	40.94%
Băsescu	33.92%
Tudor	12.57%
Markó	5.10%
Ciuhandu	1.90%
Becali	1.77%
Roman	1.35%
Dinu	1.08%
Others	1.38%

=== Parliament ===
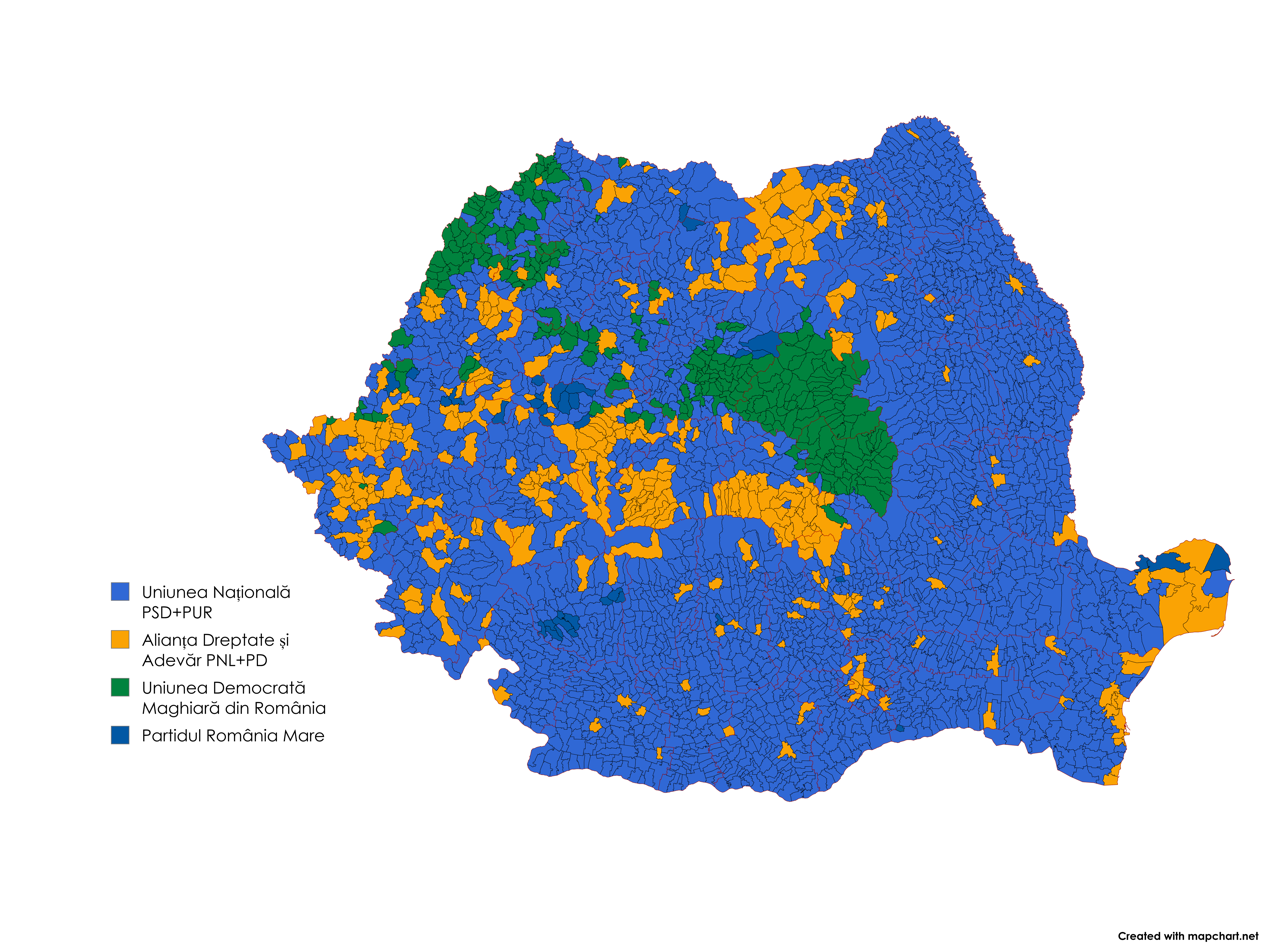
Results of the 2004 Romanian legislative elections, showing the number of votes for the party that won a plurality in each locality. Results for the Senate

==== Senate ====
Party	Votes	%	Seats	+/–
National Union PSD+PUR	3,798,607	37.13	57	–8
Justice and Truth Alliance	3,250,663	31.77	49	+23
Greater Romania Party	1,394,698	13.63	21	–16
Democratic Alliance of Hungarians in Romania	637,109	6.23	10	–2
New Generation Party	241,486	2.36	0	New
Christian Democratic National Peasants' Party	196,027	1.92	0	0
Democratic Force	95,953	0.94	0	New
Ecologist Party of Romania	83,771	0.82	0	New
United Socialist Party	60,027	0.59	0	New
Romanian National Unity Party	56,414	0.55	0	0
People's Action	52,487	0.51	0	New
Romanian Socialist Party	42,306	0.41	0	New
Romanian Workers Party	40,702	0.40	0	New
Union for Romanian Reconstruction	37,630	0.37	0	New
Socialist Alliance Party	37,019	0.36	0	New
National Democratic Christian Party	33,299	0.33	0	New
Social Democratic Party "Constantin Titel Petrescu"	25,637	0.25	0	New
Democratic Youth Party	24,725	0.24	0	New
Popular Christian Democratic Alliance	24,133	0.24	0	New
New Democracy Party	23,514	0.23	0	New
Third Millennium Party	21,301	0.21	0	New
For the Motherland Party	19,314	0.19	0	New
Alliance for the Unity of the Rroma	19,109	0.19	0	New
Independent candidate: Eberhard-Wolfgang Wittstock	11,107	0.11	0	New
Popular Party of Romania	2,436	0.02	0	New
Force of Justice	1,186	0.01	0	New
Independents	816	0.01	0	New
Total	10,231,476	100.00	137	–3
Valid votes	10,231,476	94.84		
Invalid/blank votes	556,128	5.16		
Total votes	10,787,604	100.00		
Registered voters/turnout	18,449,676	58.47		
Source: AEP

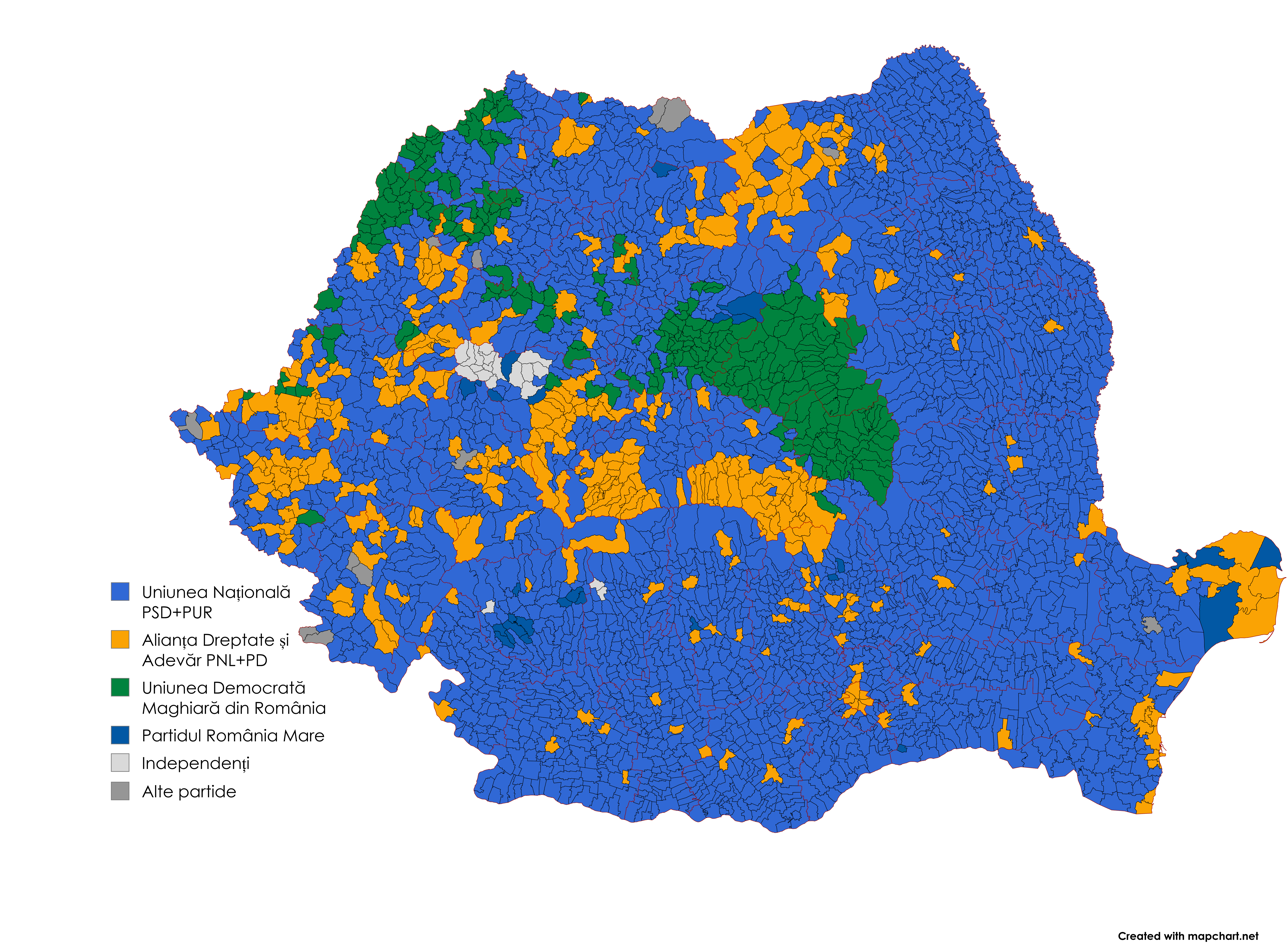
Results of the 2004 Romanian legislative elections, showing the number of votes for the party that won a plurality in each locality. Results for the Chamber of Deputies.

==== Chamber of Deputies ====
Party	Votes	%	Seats	+/–
National Union PSD+PUR	3,730,352	36.61	132	–23
Justice and Truth Alliance	3,191,546	31.33	112	+51
Greater Romania Party	1,316,751	12.92	48	–36
Democratic Alliance of Hungarians in Romania	628,125	6.17	22	–5
New Generation Party	227,443	2.23	0	0
Christian Democratic National Peasants' Party	188,268	1.85	0	0
Democratic Force	79,376	0.78	0	New
Ecologist Party of Romania	73,001	0.72	0	0
Social Democratic Roma Party of Romania	56,076	0.55	1	0
Romanian National Unity Party	53,222	0.52	0	–
People's Action	48,152	0.47	0	New
United Socialist Party	44,459	0.44	0	New
Democratic Forum of Germans	36,166	0.35	1	0
Romanian Workers' Party	35,278	0.35	0	New
Union for Romanian Reconstruction	32,749	0.32	0	New
Socialist Alliance Party	28,429	0.28	0	New
Romanian Socialist Party	28,034	0.28	0	0
National Democratic Christian Party	27,650	0.27	0	New
New Democracy Party	20,926	0.21	0	New
Social Democratic Party "Constantin Titel Petrescu"	20,318	0.20	0	0
People's Alliance of Christian Democrats	18,594	0.18	0	New
Democratic Youth Party	16,271	0.16	0	New
Bulgarian Union of Banat–Romania	15,283	0.15	1	0
Third Millennium Party	15,109	0.15	0	New
Alliance for a United Romania	15,041	0.15	0	New
Party for the Motherland	14,882	0.15	0	0
Union of the Ukrainians of Romania	10,888	0.11	1	0
Community of the Lipovan Russians in Romania	10,562	0.10	1	0
Union of Croats of Romania	10,331	0.10	1	0
Union of Armenians of Romania	9,810	0.10	1	0
Association of Macedonians of Romania	9,750	0.10	1	0
Cultural Association of Slavonic Macedonians of Romania	9,595	0.09	0	New
Federation of the Jewish Communities in Romania	8,449	0.08	1	0
Democratic Union of Croatians of Romania	7,769	0.08	0	0
Democratic Turkish Union of Romania	7,715	0.08	1	0
Ethnic Turks Association	7,396	0.07	0	New
Hellenic Union of Romania	7,161	0.07	1	0
Union of Serbs of Romania	6,643	0.07	1	0
Turco-Muslim Union of Romania	6,517	0.06	0	New
Democratic Union of Turkish-Muslim Tatars	6,452	0.06	1	0
Democratic Association of Slavonic Macedonians of Romania	6,344	0.06	0	New
Bulgarian Cultural Association of Romania	6,240	0.06	0	0
Association of Italians of Romania	6,168	0.06	1	New
Democratic Union of Slovaks and Czechs of Romania	5,950	0.06	1	0
Union of Poles of Romania	5,473	0.05	1	0
Italian Community of Romania	5,181	0.05	0	–1
Cultural Union of Poles of Romania	5,159	0.05	0	New
League of Albanians of Romania	5,011	0.05	1	0
Bratstvo Community of Bulgarians in Romania	4,065	0.04	0	0
Cultural Union of Ruthenians of Romania	2,871	0.03	1	0
People's Party of Romania	2,336	0.02	0	New
Force of Justice	1,123	0.01	0	New
Independents	51,646	0.51	0	0
Total	10,188,106	100.00	332	–13
Valid votes	10,188,106	94.44		
Invalid/blank votes	599,641	5.56		
Total votes	10,787,747	100.00		
Registered voters/turnout	18,449,344	58.47		
Source: Nohlen & Stöver, Global Elections Database

== Aftermath ==
On 13 December, the PUR president Dan Voiculescu hinted that they have more in common with the DA (both have a center-right orientation) and that they might break from the PSD, but one day later said that he would remain with PSD. It has been suggested by the press that this could be result of a blackmail about his communist past. By 25 December both UDMR and PUR signed a protocol of alliance with DA (Justice and Truth), with the designated prime minister being Călin Popescu-Tăriceanu. Thus, the PSD was left in opposition while Justice and Truth Alliance (DA), the Democratic Alliance of Hungarians in Romania (UDMR), and the Humanist Party (PUR, renamed Conservative Party in 2005) formed the government.
