= Social Democratic Party (Romania) =

Romanian political party

Coordinates: 44°27′40.46″N 26°4′52.85″E

Social Democratic Party Partidul Social Democrat
- Abbreviation: PSD
- Leader: Sorin Grindeanu
- Secretary-General: Claudiu Manda
- Leader in the Senate: Daniel-Cătălin Zamfir
- Leader in the Chamber of Deputies: Ștefan-Ovidiu Popa
- Leader in the European Parliament: Mihai Tudose
- Founded: 10 July 1993; 33 years ago (as PDSR); 16 June 2001; 25 years ago (сurrent form)
- Merger of: PDSR: Democratic Front of National Salvation; Republican Party; Romanian Socialist Democratic Party; Cooperative Party; PSD: Party of Social Democracy in Romania; Romanian Social Democratic Party
- Headquarters: Șoseaua Kiseleff 10, Bucharest
- Student wing: League of Social Democratic Students
- Youth wing: Social Democratic Youth
- Women's wing: OFSD
- Membership (2015): 530,000
- Ideology: Social democracy; Social conservatism; Pro-Europeanism
- Political position: Centre-left
- National affiliation: Alliances: Red Quadrilateral (1992–96); Social Democratic Pole of Romania (2000–04); National Union PSD+PUR (2004–05); Alliance PSD+PC (2008–09); Social Liberal Union (2011–14); Centre Left Alliance (2012–14); Social Democratic Union (2014–19); National Coalition for Romania (2021–25); Romania Forward (2025)
- European affiliation: Party of European Socialists
- European Parliament group: Progressive Alliance of Socialists and Democrats
- International affiliation: Progressive Alliance; Socialist International
- Colours: Red; White
- Senate: 43 / 135
- Chamber of Deputies: 92 / 330
- European Parliament: 11 / 33
- Mayors: 1,362 / 3,176
- County Presidents: 25 / 41
- County Councilors: 362 / 1,340
- Local Council Councilors: 16,499 / 39,900
- Ministers: 12 / 18

Party flag

Website
- psd.ro
- Politics of Romania; Political parties; Elections; A: Also sometimes described as a big tent or catch-all party.

The Social Democratic Party (Romanian: Partidul Social Democrat, PSD) is the largest political party in Romania. It is also the largest social democratic political party in the country. It was founded by Ion Iliescu, Romania's first democratically elected president at the 1990 Romanian general election.

It is a member of the Progressive Alliance (PA), which was founded in 2013, Socialist International (SI), and the Party of European Socialists (PES). As of 2015, the PSD had 530,000 members.

PSD traces its origins to the Democratic Front of National Salvation (FDSN), a leftist breakaway group established in 1992 from the centre-left National Salvation Front (FSN) established after 1989. In 1993, this merged with three other parties to become the Party of Social Democracy in Romania (Romanian: Partidul Democrației Sociale in România, PDSR), also translated as the Social Democracy Party of Romania. The present name was adopted after a merger with the smaller Romanian Social Democratic Party (PSDR) in 2001.

Since its formation, it has always been one of the two dominant parties of the country. The PDSR governed Romania from 1992 to 1996, while the PSDR was a junior coalition partner between 1996 and 2000. The merged PSD was the senior party in the coalitions governing from 2000 to 2004, and from March 2014 to November 2015, as well as one of the main coalition partners between December 2008 and October 2009 (with the Democratic Liberal Party, PDL) and again between May 2012 and March 2014 (as part of the Social Liberal Union, USL). PSD left government after former prime minister, Victor Ponta resigned in November 2015, only for PSD to return as the senior governing party in January 2017, shortly after it achieved a major victory in the 2016 Romanian parliamentary election. The party remained in power at governmental level until 2019, before being voted down in the parliament and then endorsing a PNL minority government between 2019 and 2020. Subsequently, it entered opposition between 2020 and 2021, before eventually returning to government within the CNR coalition in late 2021.

Party founder Ion Iliescu is the only PSD candidate to become President of Romania, he served in office from the 1989 to 1996, and again from 2000 to 2004.

Currently, PSD remains the largest party in the Parliament of Romania with initially 36 seats in the Senate of Romania and 86 seats in the Chamber of Deputies (as obtained at the 2024 Romanian parliamentary election), it also has the largest number of mayors, as well as the second largest number of local and county councillors and county presidents (after PNL), remaining the biggest and most influential political force in the country to the present day.

== History ==
Following the 27–29 May 1992 Convention of the National Salvation Front (Romanian: Frontul Salvării Naționale, FSN) when Petre Roman became President of the Party, former Party Leader Ion Iliescu and his group of supporters withdrew from FSN and founded the Democratic National Salvation Front (Romanian: Frontul Democrat al Salvării Naționale, FDSN) while the rest of FSN was renamed as the Democratic Party (Romanian: Partidul Democrat) in May 1993.

During its first National Conference on the 28th of June 1992, FDSN decided on endorsing Ion Iliescu in the 1992 Romanian general election, which they later won and went on to govern Romania until 1996. On 10 July 1993, it took the name of Party of Social Democracy in Romania (PDSR) upon merger with the Romanian Socialist Democratic Party, the Republican Party, and the Cooperative Party.

The logo of the Party of Social Democracy in Romania

From 1992 to 1996, the PDSR ruled in coalition with the Romanian National Unity Party (PUNR) and Greater Romania Party (PRM), and the left-wing Socialist Party of Labour (PSM), nicknamed by the Press as the Red Quadrilateral. The PUNR had ministers in the cabinet chaired by Nicolae Văcăroiu from March 1992 to September 1996. The PRM was not present at the cabinet-level but was given some posts in the state administration but which it retracted when it left the coalition in 1995.

PDSR went into opposition after the 1996 Romanian general election, which was won by the right-wing coalition Romanian Democratic Convention (CDR).

After four years of governmental turmoil and economic downfall, poorly managed by the crumbling CDR, saw PDSR making a fulminant comeback, winning the 2000 Romanian general election, this time in a coalition named the Social Democratic Pole of Romania (PDSR) along with the Romanian Social Democratic Party (PSDR, who was part of the government from 1996 to 2000, as a member of the Social Democratic Union, now led by Alexandru Athanasiu) and the Romanian Humanist Party (PUR). The PSDR merged with PDSR on 16 June 2001, and the resulting party took the PSD name, with PDSR/PSD leader Adrian Năstase becoming prime minister. The centre-left Democratic Party (PD) was also invited by both Athanasiu and Năstase to join the new PSD, but PD president Traian Băsescu refused to take part in the merger. A controversial figure due to the corruption scandals in which he and his party were involved, Năstase is still regarded by both admirers and rivals (including his archrival Traian Băsescu), as the best and most efficient Romanian post-communist Prime Minister, being praised for his efforts of Euro-Atlantic integration of Romania and for the stabilization and modernization of the Romanian economy.

The former blue and white PSD logo, used between 2001 and 2006

In November 2004, Adrian Năstase, the PSD candidate and incumbent Prime Minister of Romania, won the first round of the presidential elections but did not have a majority and had to go to a second round of voting, which he narrowly lost to Traian Băsescu of the opposition Justice and Truth Alliance (DA), who became Romania's 4th president. In the 2004 Romanian general election, the PSD gained the largest share of the vote but because it did not have a majority, the other parties that managed to enter parliament, UDMR/RMDSZ and PUR, abandoned their respective pre-electoral agreements with the PSD and joined the Justice and Truth Alliance (DA), mainly at the pressure of Băsescu. Mircea Geoană was elected president of the party in April 2005 by delegates at a PSD Party Congress held in Bucharest. His victory represented a surprise defeat for Iliescu, who was expected to defeat Geoană with ease. On 17 April 2008, the PSD and the PC announced they would form a political alliance for the 2008 Romanian local elections.

In February 2010, the Congress elected Victor Ponta as president after Geoană lost the 2009 Romanian presidential election. On 5 February 2011, the PSD formed a political alliance known as the Social Liberal Union (USL) with the PC and the National Liberal Party (PNL). The USL was disbanded on 25 February 2014 with exit of the PNL, which entered the opposition.

In July 2015, Liviu Dragnea was elected by the Congress of the PSD as the new president of the party, with 97% of the votes from the members. He was elected as leader after the former prime minister Victor Ponta stepped down on 12 July 2015 following charges of corruption that were later dropped. On 12 April 2019, the PSD was suspended from the Party of European Socialists (PES) following concerns about judicial reforms of the Dăncilă Cabinet. In May 2019, after Liviu Dragnea's jailing, Viorica Dăncilă was elected by the Congress of the PSD as the new president of the party.

After being ousted from power in October 2019, the PSD also lost the 2019 Romanian presidential election. Such decline sent shockwase across the European Union (EU), especially the PES, as it resulted in their loss of power within von der Leyen Commission. Nonetheless, Daniel Hegedüs posited that this could be a win for both the PES and the wider European left, as the PES would regain credibility because "mounting authoritarianism in Hungary and Poland has suffered under the burden of PSD's rule-of-law record". In addition, Hegedüs noted the fact that this could represent another chance for the PSD to reform itself and change its ways.

In August 2020, Marcel Ciolacu became president of the party (after having previously served for this position only as ad interim between November 2019 and August 2020). During the same month, the PSD was willing to vote a motion of no confidence against the second Orban cabinet. Shortly after December 2020, while still the largest party in the wake of the 2020 Romanian legislative election, the PSD suffered significant political capital losses (as they previously did in the 2020 Romanian local elections as well) given the chaotic and negative governmental activity the party was responsible for during the former legislature (more specifically during the years 2017 and 2019), yet remained the biggest parliamentary opposition well up until the end of 2021.

During the 2021 Romanian political crisis, the PSD was again willing to have such a vote, this time against the Cîțu Cabinet, which it subsequently did, thereby contributing to its final dismissal. In November 2021, successful negotiations with the PNL led the PSD closer to returning government in the incumbent Ciucă Cabinet within a grand coalition government known as the National Coalition for Romania (or CNR for short). The PSD is still governing Romania as of early 2022, albeit with major tensions in the said grand coalition. The coalition has been described as authoritarian conservative.

In November 2022, the PSD agreed with the Moldovan European Social Democratic Party (PSDE) to begin a strategic partnership.

== Predecessors and successors ==
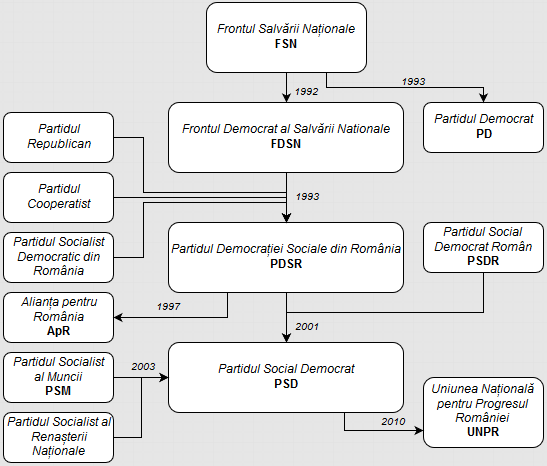
Flowchart denoting the political evolution of PSD, from its origins in the FSN in 1990 until the year 2010, with political groups which were both integrated and seceded from the party throughout the passing of time.

=== Party splits ===
- Alliance for Romania (1997)
- National Union for the Progress of Romania (2010)
- Romanian Social Party (2015), Succeeded by Prahova in Action Party (2020), then by Romania in Action Party (2023)
- United Romania Party (2015)
- PRO Romania (2018)
- Romanian Nationhood Party (2019)
- Alliance for the Homeland (2023)

=== Absorbed parties ===
- Republican Party (1993)^{1}
- Cooperative Party (1993)^{1}
- Romanian Socialist Democratic Party (1993)^{1}
- Party of Social Solidarity (1994)^{1}
- Romanian Social Democratic Party (2001)^{2}
- Socialist Party of Labour (2003)
- Socialist Party of National Renaissance (2003)

Notes

^{1} After the merger, the party changed its name from the Democratic National Salvation Front (FDSN) to the Party of Social Democracy in Romania (PDSR).

^{2} After the merger, the party changed its name from the Party of Social Democracy in Romania (PDSR) to the Social Democratic Party (PSD).

== Ideology and platform ==
Like its counterpart national-level members of the Party of European Socialists (PES), the PSD has a centre-left outlook and has been described as governing as centre-left, but has also been described as pragmatic, owing to its syncretic politics. The party has been described as social democratic, socially conservative, economically patriotic, economically liberal, left-wing nationalist, and left-wing populist. The PSD was formed as a result of the merger of the Romanian Social Democratic Party (PSDR), which had an internationalist social-democratic ideology, with the Party of Social Democracy in Romania (PDSR), whose governance was marked by a combination of social democracy, democratic socialism, labourism, pragmatism, left-wing populism, and nationalism. The 2003 absorption of the Socialist Party of Labour (PSM) and the Socialist Party of the National Renaissance (PSRN) led to the strengthening of the left-wing nationalist component within the party. Until 2021 unlike the majority of Western European PES party members and as other like-minded centre-left, social democratic parties in Central and Eastern European post-communism, it has taken a more soft Eurosceptic outlook, though it is neutral in regards to European integration. The PSD stated that it endorses EU and NATO membership. The party is more conservative than PES when it comes to social issues, reflecting the country's social-conservative outlook, including its centre-right counterpart, the National Liberal Party (PNL).

The party has been described as having centre-left rhetoric and economic policies, while being more conservative on personal and ethical matters. According to Florin Poenaru, "the movement led by Ion Iliescu was from the very beginning the party of local capitalists and not of the industrial proletariat. ... PSD was the party that aggregated the interests of the autochthonous capitalists, but whose electoral basis was the former industrial proletariat." Poenaru states that PSD never said no to the neoliberal agenda but applied it rather slowly. Andrei Pleșu once stated that the main post-communist Romanian parties do not act according to some ideology or doctrine.

Political analyst Radu Magdin said that the PSD is "a catch-all party: its values are conservative, its economic policy is liberal and it has a social, left-leaning rhetoric when it comes to public policies." An example is their calls for both tax cuts and pensions and wages increase in 2016. Its more conservative outlook is owed to the social-conservative nature of post-communist countries, and has been adopted by both the centre-left (PSD) and the centre-right (PNL). For Cornel Ban, Assistant Professor of International Relations at the Pardee School of Boston University, the PSD is an anomaly in Eastern Europe in that it was an ideal playground for right-wing populist parties but has seen the political left routinely win; this was in part because the political right and far-right were in government, including at the local level, during the post-communist slumps which remained in the mind of many voters. Journalist Jean-Baptiste Chastand said that the PSD-led pro-European government in Romania took a national conservative turn. The historian Ioan Stanomir stated that PSD is a conservative party, that has nothing to do with the left, while journalist Bogdan Tiberiu Iacob described the party as progressive-conservative. PSD also opposed the mandatory refugee quotas. Journalist Daniel Mihăilescu labeled the party as national populist. Deutsche Welle stated that, unlike most European Social-democratic parties, PSD is against social progressivism and is strongly conservative. Journalist and philosipher Andrei Cornea also stated that PSD is not a social-democratic party, but a patrimonial-conservative one, structured around vassalism and clientelism, whose essential electoral pool is formed by a poor, ignorant and especially devoid of civic conscience. PSD has also ethno-nationalist factions. Under Dragnea's leadership, PSD has been described as national populist and sovereigntist. The populist labeled PSD under Victor Ponta and Liviu Dragnea as "nationalist, economically liberal, socially conservative".

In regards to LGBT rights, in general, PSD opposes the recognition of same-sex marriages and civil partnerships. However, in 2018, then PSD president Liviu Dragnea hinted that PSD could support the recognition of civil partnerships. Also, in January 2001, it was the PSD-dominated Adrian Năstase's government that adopted the Emergency Ordinance no. 89/2001, which eliminated Art. 200 of the Penal Code and adjusted other articles referring to sex offences to avoid discriminatory treatment of offenders, thus legalising same-sex relations. This ordinance came into force in January 2002, after President Ion Iliescu (the founder of PSD) signed the new law. However, the former president of the Social Democrats, Marcel Ciolacu, was a strong opponent to the recognition of same-sex marriages and the civil partnership.

The party has strong connections with the Romanian Orthodox Church (BOR), reflecting the party's social conservatism.

== Structure ==
=== President ===
The president of the party conducts the general activity of the party, the activity of the National Executive Committee and the National Permanent Bureau and responds to the Congress on the general work of the PSD. The president is elected by secret vote by the Congress for a four-year mandate and represents the party in the Romanian society, in relations with the central and local public authorities, as well as with other parties or organizations in the country or abroad.

=== Honorary President ===
PSD Honorary President is nominated by Congress for the four-year mandate of the party's recognized personalities. The Honorary President of the PSD participates with the right to vote in the work of the national governing bodies.

=== Secretary-General ===
The Secretary-General manages the functional services at the central level and the relationship with the county and Bucharest organizations. It coordinates the Executive Secretariat of the PSD with 7 to 9 executive secretaries. Executive secretaries shall be appointed by the National Executive Committee, on a proposal from the chair, after consulting the Secretary-General.

=== Permanent National Bureau ===
The Permanent National Bureau is the operative body for analyzing and deciding the party. It has the following composition: PSD President, PSD Honorary President, PSD Secretary General, PSD Deputy Chairpersons. At the National Permanent Bureau, the chairman of the National Council, the leaders of the parliamentary groups, the presidents of women and youth organizations, the treasurer, the director of the Social Democratic Institute, the representative of the county administrative council presidents, the mayors of municipalities and the representative of the National League of Mayors and PSD Councilors participate. The National Permanent Bureau meets weekly, usually Monday.

The Permanent National Bureau have the following duties:

- To organize and direct the entire activity of the party according to the decisions adopted as appropriate by the Congress, the National Council, and the National Executive Committee.
- Drafts draft decisions that it submits to the debate and adoption of the National Executive Committee.
- Orientates the work of parliamentary groups.
- Establishes and coordinates working committees on doctrine, electoral programs, and strategies.
- Establishes and co-ordinates political analysis groups of the economic, social, domestic and international situation.
- Manages the party's patrimony.

=== National Executive Committee ===
Coordinates the entire activity of the party between the meetings of the National Council. The PSD National Executive Committee analyzes, debates and decides on the fundamental issues of the Party's work on: the program, the electoral strategy, the political and electoral alliances, the governing program, the structure and the nominal composition of the Government, the validation of the party's preliminary election for the nomination of candidates for senators, MEPs, MEPs, and elected local, merging by absorption or merging with other parties; PSD collaboration agreements with trade unions and employers' confederations; the strategy of selecting, preparing, training and promoting the party's human resources, organizing and conducting internal party choices, coordinating the activities of the Youth Organization and the Women's Organization.

The adopted decisions are validated by the National Council. The National Executive Committee consists of PSD President, PSD Honorary President, PSD Secretary General, PSD Vice Presidents, President of the National Council, Presidents of County Organizations, Sectors and the Bucharest Municipality Organization, the president of the Women's Organization and the president of the Youth Organization.

=== National Council ===
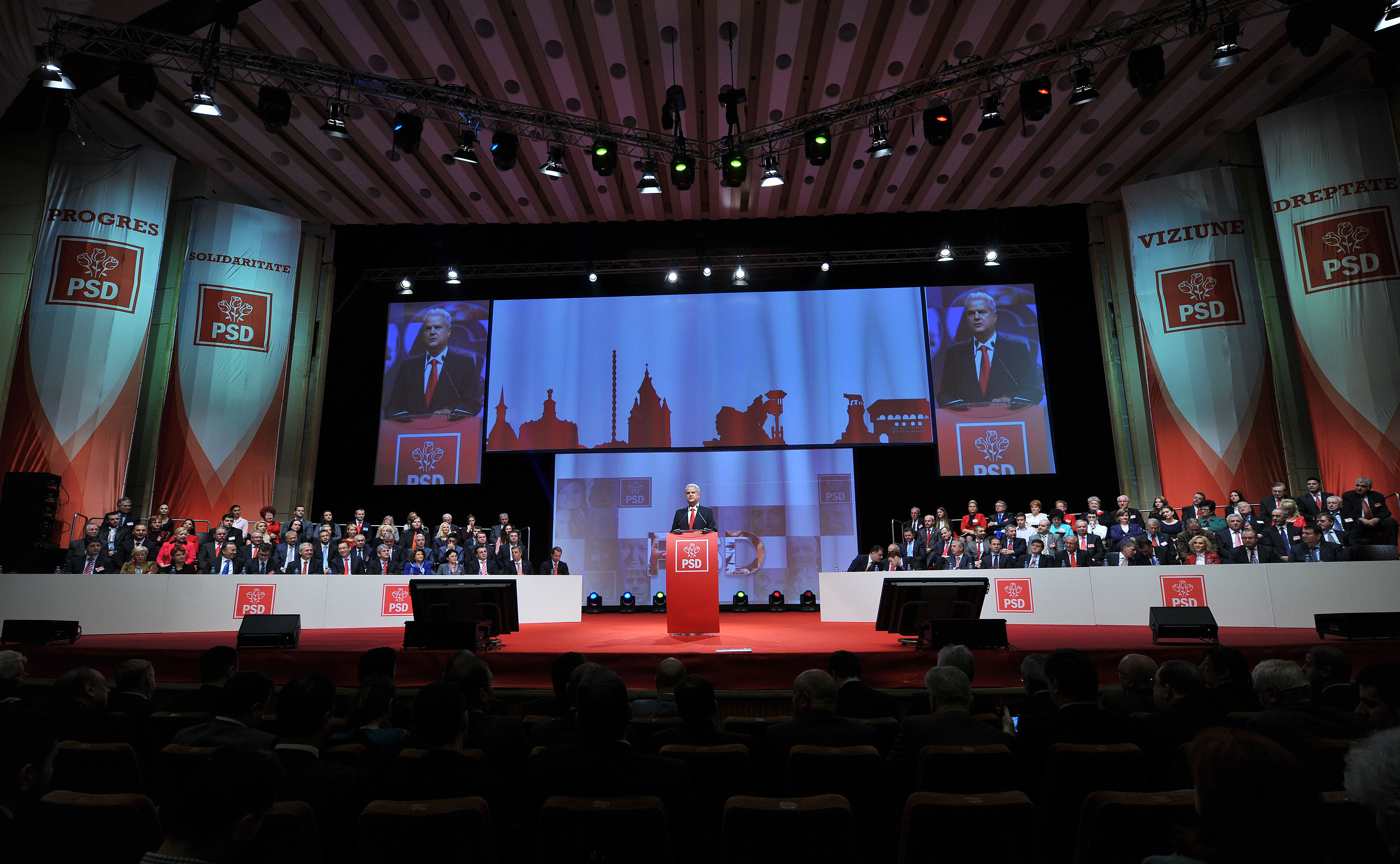
Adrian Năstase during a meeting of the National Council in November 2013

The National Council is the governing body of the party in the interval between two congresses. It consists of a maximum of 751 members elected from the candidates nominated by the County and Bucharest Conferences, or proposed by the Congress. The National Council elects and revokes by secret vote the president of the National Council and the treasurer, validates the composition of the National Executive Committee and The Permanent National Bureau; decides to conclude political alliances as well as merge by merging or absorbing with other political parties or political parties; to hear the activity reports submitted by members of the Permanent National Bureau, by the Chairman of the Commission for Arbitration and Moral Integrity, by the president of the National Commission for Financial Control and Treasurer and decides accordingly on the basis of the mandate given by the Congress, according to the provisions of the Statute; is responsible for organizing presidential, parliamentary, euro-parliamentary and local electoral campaigns; analyzes the work of parliamentary groups, women's and youth organizations, the National League of Mayors and PSD Councilors; validates the decisions of the National Executive Committee on the Governance Program and confirms the proposals of members of the Government; resolve the appeals lodged against the decisions of the councils of the county organizations or of the Bucharest municipality; resolves the divergences between the Councils of the County Organizations, respectively the Bucharest Municipality Organization and the National Executive Committee in connection with the nomination of the candidates for the legislative elections, if they persist; approves the party's annual revenue and expenditure budget, decides on its execution.

The PSD National Council meets annually and whenever needed. Deputies, senators and MEPs who are not members of the National Council participate in its meetings without the right to vote. The National Council may decide, on a proposal from the Permanent National Bureau, to organize forums, leagues, associations, clubs and other such bodies for the promotion of strategies in the PSD Political Program, in the Romanian society and in partnership with the trade unions. The party-union relationship as well as the concrete ways of collaboration will be established by the National Permanent Bureau. Within the PSD there are: the National Workers' Forum; National Farmers Forum; National Ecologists' Forum; The National Forum of Scientists, Culture and Art and the Pensioners' League. In order to develop PSD programs and strategies in the field of party life, consultative councils can be set up on: political analysis, image and relations with the media; organization and human resources. The Consultative Council for the Problems of National Minorities of the PSD carries out activities to identify the specific problems faced by national minorities in Romania and develops appropriate solutions and proposals for their resolution.

=== Congress ===
The supreme governing party of the Social Democratic Party is the Congress, which is convened every four years or in extraordinary cases. The PSD Congress is made up of elected delegates by secret ballot by the County Conferences and the Bucharest Municipality and has the following attributions: adopting or modifying the PSD Statute and the Political Program of the Party; sets out the party's guidelines, strategy and tactics for the period between two congresses; elects the party chairman, the vice-presidents, the general secretary, the other members of the National Council, the National Commission for Arbitration and Moral Integrity and the National Commission for Financial Control; appoints the PSD candidate to the position of President of Romania and the prime minister in the event of winning the elections; resolves possible appeals against decisions of other PSD central bodies.

== Party leadership ==
Also served as President of Romania
Also served as Prime Minister
Also served as Chamber President
Also served as Senate President

Nº	Name Birth–Death	Portrait	Term start	Term end	Duration
1	Ion Iliescu (1930–2025)		7 April 1992	11 October 1992	6 months and 4 days
2	Oliviu Gherman (1930–2020)		11 October 1992	January 1997	c. 4 years and 2 months
(1)	Ion Iliescu (1930–2025)		January 1997	20 December 2000	c. 4 years
3	Adrian Năstase^{1} (1950– )		20 December 2000	21 January 2005	4 years, 1 month and 1 day
4	Mircea Geoană (1958–		2005	2010	c. 5 years
5	Victor Ponta (1972–		21 February 2010	12 July 2015	5 years, 4 months and 21 days
—	Rovana Plumb (acting) (1960–		24 June 2015	22 July 2015	28 days
—	Liviu Dragnea (acting) (1962– )		22 July 2015	12 October 2015	2 months and 20 days
6	Liviu Dragnea (1962– )		12 October 2015	27 May 2019	3 years, 7 months and 15 days
7	Viorica Dăncilă (1963–		27 May 2019	26 November 2019	5 months and 30 days
—	Marcel Ciolacu (acting) (1967–		26 November 2019	22 August 2020	8 months and 27 days
8	Marcel Ciolacu (1967–		22 August 2020	25 November 2024	4 years, 3 months and 3 days
—	Victor Negrescu (acting) (1985–		25 November 2024	3 December 2024	9 days
(8)	Marcel Ciolacu (1967–		3 December 2024	20 May 2025	5 months and 17 days
—	Sorin Grindeanu (acting) (1973–		20 May 2025	7 November 2025	5 months and 18 days
9	Sorin Grindeanu (1973–		7 November 2025	present	1 year and 11 days

Notes

^{1} Năstase served twice as Chamber President, the first term from March 1992 to May 1996, while the second from December 2004 to March 2006.

=== Presidents ===
- Oliviu Gherman: 1992–1996 (FDSN/PDSR);
- Ion Iliescu: 1992, 1997–2000 (PDSR);
- Adrian Năstase: 2000–2005 (acting/ad interim until 2001) (PDSR/PSD);
- Mircea Geoană: 2005–2010 (PSD);
- Victor Ponta: 2010–2015 (PSD);
- Rovana Plumb: 2015 (acting/ad interim) (PSD);
- Liviu Dragnea: 2015–2019 (PSD);
- Viorica Dăncilă: 2019 (PSD);
- Marcel Ciolacu: 2019–2025 (acting/ad interim until 2020) (PSD).
- Sorin Grindeanu: 2025–present (acting/ad interim until November 2025) (PSD).

=== Executive presidents ===
- Adrian Năstase: 1993–1997;
- position abolished 1997–2003;
- Octav Cozmâncă: 2003–2005;
- Adrian Năstase: 2005–2006;
- Dan Mircea Popescu: 2005–2006, when the office was dissolved (nominated acting/ad interim after the resignation of Adrian Năstase from the office);
- position abolished 2006–2013;
- Liviu Dragnea: 2013–2015;
- Valeriu Zgonea: 2015–2016;
- Niculae Bădălău: 2016–2018;
- Viorica Dăncilă: 2018–2019;
- Paul Stănescu: 2019 (acting/ad interim);
- Eugen Teodorovici: 2019;
- position abolished: 2019–present.

== Notable members ==
=== Current notable members ===
- Nicolae Văcăroiu, former prime minister of Romania;
- Alexandru Athanasiu, former acting prime minister;
- Viorel Hrebenciuc, former deputy;
- Eugen Bejinariu, former acting prime minister;
- Ilie Sârbu, former president of the Senate;
- Paul Stănescu, former deputy prime minister as well as Minister of Regional Development;
- Ecaterina Andronescu, former Minister of Education;
- Marcel Ciolacu, former prime minister of Romania;
- Gabriela Firea, former mayor of Bucharest;
- Rovana Plumb, MEP, Minister of Environment, Minister of Labour;
- Mihai Tudose, former prime minister of Romania;
- Sorin Grindeanu, former prime minister of Romania;
- Mihai Fifor, former acting prime minister of Romania;
- Dan Nica, former deputy and current MEP;
- Lia Olguța Vasilescu, Mayor of Craiova, Minister of Labour;
- Alexandru Rafila, current Health Minister.

=== Former notable members ===
- Titus Corlățean, former Minister of Foreign Affairs, former Minister of Justice;
- Gabriel Oprea, former army general (now general in army reserves), former Minister of National Defence, former deputy prime minister of Romania, former Minister of Internal Affairs, former acting prime minister of Romania;
- Ion Iliescu, founder of the party the party FDSN which then became PDSR and ultimately as PSD, former president of Romania, and Honorary President of PSD;
- Corina Crețu, former European Commissioner for Cohesion and Reforms;
- Viorica Dăncilă, former president of the party, former prime minister of Romania;
- Adrian Năstase, former president of the party, former prime minister of Romania as well as former Minister of Foreign Affairs;
- Ilie Năstase, former No. 1 tennis player
- Teodor Meleșcanu, former Minister of Defence, former acting Minister of Justice, former Director of the Foreign Intelligence; Service (SRI), former Minister of Foreign Affairs three times, former president of the Senate;
- Robert Negoiță, former mayor of the 3rd Sector of Bucharest;
- Mircea Geoană, former president of the party, former president of the Senate as well as former Minister of Foreign Affairs;
- Sorin Oprescu, former mayor of Bucharest;
- Marian Vanghelie, former mayor of the 5th Sector of Bucharest;
- Radu Mazăre, former mayor of Constanța;
- Victor Ponta, former president of the party as well as former prime minister of Romania;
- Valeriu Zgonea, former president of the Chamber of Deputies;
- Liviu Dragnea, former president of the party as well as former president of the Chamber of Deputies;
- Oliviu Gherman, former president of the party as well as former president of the Chamber of Deputies;
- Șerban Valeca, acting president of the Senate;
- Hildegard Puwak, former Minister for European Integration;
- Antonie Iorgovan, lead author of the 1991 Romanian Constitution;
- Sebastian Ghiță, former member of the Chamber of Deputies;
- Cristian Diaconescu, former State Secretary at the Ministry of Foreign Affairs, former Minister of Justice, former Minister of Foreign Affairs twice.

== Election results ==
=== Legislative elections - Chamber of Deputies ===
Election	Party leader	Performance					Rank	Government
Election	Party leader	Votes	%	± pp	Seats	+/–	Rank	Government
1992	Ion Iliescu	3,003,573	27.75	New	117 / 341	New	1st	
1996	Ion Iliescu	2,633,860	21.52	▼6.23	91 / 343	▼26	▼2nd	
2000	Ion Iliescu	3,968,464	36.61	▲15.09	139 / 345	▲48	▲1st	
2004	Adrian Năstase	3,730,352	36.61	0.00	113 / 332	▼26	1st	
2008	Mircea Geoană	2,279,449	33.10	▼3.51	110 / 334	▼3	1st	
2012	Victor Ponta	4,344,288	58.63	▲25.53	149 / 412	▲39	1st	
2016	Liviu Dragnea	3,204,864	45.48	▼13.15	154 / 329	▲5	1st	
2020	Marcel Ciolacu	1,705,777	28.90	▼16.58	110 / 330	▼44	1st	
2024	Marcel Ciolacu	2,030,144	21.96	▼6.94	86 / 331	▼24	1st	

=== Legislative elections - Senate of Romania ===
Election	Party leader	Performance					Rank	Government
Election	Party leader	Votes	%	± pp	Seats	+/–	Rank	Government
1992	Ion Iliescu	3,102,201	28.29	New	49 / 143	New	1st	
1996	Ion Iliescu	2,836,011	23.08	▼5.21	41 / 143	▼8	▼2nd	
2000	Ion Iliescu	4,040,212	37.09	▲14.01	59 / 140	▲18	▲1st	
2004	Adrian Năstase	3,798,607	36.30	▼0.79	46 / 137	▼13	1st	
2008	Mircea Geoană	2,352,968	34.16	▼2.14	48 / 137	▲2	1st	
2012	Victor Ponta	4,457,526	60.10	▲25.94	58 / 176	▲10	1st	
2016	Liviu Dragnea	3,221,786	45.68	▼14.42	67 / 136	▲9	1st	
2020	Marcel Ciolacu	1,732,276	29.32	▼16.36	47 / 136	▼20	1st	
2024	Marcel Ciolacu	2,065,087	22.30	▼7.02	36 / 136	▼11	1st	

=== Legislative elections ===
Year	Position	Aftermath			
Year	Position	Aftermath	1992	1st (as FDSN)	PDSR-PUNR-PRM-PSM government (1992–1996)
1996	2nd (as PDSR)	Opposition to CDR-USD-UDMR government (1996–2000)			
2000	1st (within PDSR)^{1}	PDSR minority government (2000–2004)			
2004	1st (within PSD+PUR)^{2}	Opposition to DA-PUR^{3}-UDMR government (2004–2007)			
2004	1st (within PSD+PUR)^{2}	Endorsing PNL-UDMR minority government (2007–2008)			
2008	2nd (within PSD+PC)^{4}	PDL-PSD government (2008–2009)			
2008	2nd (within PSD+PC)^{4}	Opposition to PDL-UNPR-UDMR government (2009–2012)			
2008	2nd (within PSD+PC)^{4}	USL government (2012)			
2012	1st (within USL)^{5}	USL government (2012–2014)			
2012	1st (within USL)^{5}	PSD-UNPR-UDMR-PC government (2014)			
2012	1st (within USL)^{5}	PSD-UNPR-ALDE government (2014–2015)			
2012	1st (within USL)^{5}	Endorsing the technocratic Cioloș Cabinet (2015–2017)			
2016	1st	PSD-ALDE government (2017–2019)			
2016	1st	PSD minority government (2019)			
2016	1st	Endorsing PNL minority government (2019–2020)			
2016	1st	Opposition to PNL minority government (2020)			
2020	1st	Opposition to PNL-USR PLUS-UDMR government (2020–2021)			
2020	1st	Opposition to PNL-UDMR minority government (2021)			
2020	1st	CNR government (2021–2024)			
2024	1st	PSD-PNL-UDMR minority government (2024–2025)			
2024	1st	Opposition to PNL-UDMR minority government (2025)			
2024	1st	PSD-PNL–USR-UDMR government (2025–2026)			
2024	1st	Opposition to PNL–USR-UDMR minority government (2026–present)			

Notes

^{1} Social Democratic Pole of Romania members: PDSR, PSDR (2 senators and 10 deputies), and PUR (4 senators and 6 deputies).
^{2} National Union PSD+PUR members: PSD and PUR (11 senators and 19 deputies).
^{3} Soon after the elections, PUR broke the alliance with the PSD and switched sides, joining the government led by the Justice and Truth Alliance (DA).
^{4} Alliance PSD+PC members: PSD and PC (1 senator and 4 deputies).
^{5} The Social Liberal Union (USL) was an alliance consisting of two smaller alliances, more specifically the Centre Left Alliance (ACS) and the Centre Right Alliance (ACD). The members of the Centre Left Alliance (ACS) were the PSD and the UNPR (5 senators and 10 deputies) whereas the members of the Centre Right Alliance (ACD) were the PNL (50 senators and 100 deputies) and the PC (8 senators and 13 deputies).

=== Local elections ===
Year	County councilors			Mayors			Local councilors			Popular vote	%	Position
Year	Votes	%	Seats	Votes	%	Seats	Votes	%	Seats	Popular vote	%	Position
1996	1,390,225	16.28	290 / 1,718	2,713,095	26.28	928 / 2,954	1,716,899	18.82	9,483 / 33,429	—N/a	—N/a	1st
2000	2,241,930	27.4	496 / 1,718	2,416,598	27.4	1,050 / 2,954	2,197,719	25.8	11,380 / 39,718	—N/a	—N/a	1st
2004	2,957,617	32.70	543 / 1,436	3,908,895	41.83	1,702 / 3,137	2,951,226	31.88	14,990 / 40,031	—N/a	—N/a	1st
2008	2,337,102	27.97	452 / 1,393	2,717,490	30.77	1,138 / 3,179	2,268,271	26.67	12,137 / 40,297	—N/a	—N/a	2nd
2012	4,203,007	49.68	723 / 1,338	2,782,792	33.99	1,292 / 3,121	2,630,123	32.74	12,668 / 39,121	—N/a	—N/a	1st (as USL)
2016	3,270,909	39.60	638 / 1,434	3,330,213	38.98	1,708 / 3,186	3,161,046	37.70	16,969 / 40,067	—N/a	—N/a	1st
2020	1,605,721	22.32	362 / 1,340	2,262,791	30.34	1,362 / 3,176	2,090,777	28.40	13,820 / 39,900	—N/a	—N/a	2nd
2024	2,640,850	33.50	550 / 1,338	3,045,816	34.74	1,677 / 3,180	2,830,129	32.56	16,509 / 39,900	3,045,816	34.74%	1st

Year	County presidents			Position
Year	Votes	%	Seats	Position
1992	—N/a	—N/a	30 / 41	1st (as FSN)
1996	—N/a	—N/a	17 / 41	1st
2000	—N/a	—N/a	29 / 41	1st
2004	—N/a	—N/a	19 / 41	1st
2008	2,234,465	28.06	17 / 41	1st
2012	4,260,709	49.71	22 / 41	1st (within USL)
2016	—N/a	—N/a	28 / 41	1st
2020	1,663,399	22.86	20 / 41	1st
2024	2,823,291	35.56	25 / 41	1st

==== Mayor of Bucharest elections ====
Year	Candidate	First round			Second round		
Year	Candidate	Votes	Percentage	Position	Votes	Percentage	Position
1996	Ilie Năstase	—N/a	30.38%	2nd	—N/a	43.26%	2nd
2000	Sorin Oprescu	260,689	41.16%	1st	353,038	49.31%	2nd
2004	Mircea Geoană	225,774	29.74%	2nd	—		
2008	Cristian Diaconescu	67,251	12.33%	3rd	not qualified		
2012	Sorin Oprescu^{1}	430,512	53.79%	1st	—		
2016	Gabriela Firea	246,553	42.97%	1st	single-round elections		
2020	Gabriela Firea	250,690	37.97%	2nd	single-round elections		
2024	Gabriela Firea	163,147	22.34%	2nd	single-round elections		

Note

^{1} Independent candidate endorsed by the USL.

=== Presidential elections ===
Year	Candidate	First round			Second round		
Year	Candidate	Votes	Percentage	Position	Votes	Percentage	Position
1990	Ion Iliescu	12,232,498	85.0%	1st	—		
1992	Ion Iliescu	5,633,465	47.5%	1st	7,393,429	61.4%	1st
1996	Ion Iliescu	4,081,093	32.3%	1st	5,914,579	45.6%	2nd
2000	Ion Iliescu	4,076,273	36.4%	1st	6,696,623	66.8%	1st
2004	Adrian Năstase	4,278,864	40.9%	1st	4,881,520	48.8%	2nd
2009	Mircea Geoană	3,027,838	31.1%	2nd	5,205,760	49.7%	2nd
2014	Victor Ponta	3,836,093	40.4%	1st	5,264,383	45.6%	2nd
2019	Viorica Dăncilă	2,051,725	22.3%	2nd	3,339,922	33.9%	2nd
2024	Marcel Ciolacu	1,769,761	19.15%	3rd	not qualified		
2025	Crin Antonescu^{1}	1,892,930	20.07%	3rd	not qualified		

^{1} Crin Antonescu was the common candidate of the Romania Forward Electoral Alliance (A.RO), an elecotral alliance consisting of the PSD, PNL, and UDMR/RMDSZ.

=== European Parliament elections ===
Year	Votes	%	MEPs	Position	EU party	EP group
Jan. 2007	—N/a	34.28	12 / 35	1st	PES	S&D
Nov. 2007	1,184,018	23.11 ▼	10 / 35 ▼	2nd ▼	PES	S&D
2009	1,504,218 ▲	31.07 ▲	10 / 33 ▲	1st (within PSD+PC)^{1} ▲	PES	S&D
2014	2,093,237 ▲	37.60 ▲	12 / 32 ▲	1st (within USD)^{2}	PES	S&D
2019	2,040,765 ▼	22.51 ▼	9 / 32 ▼	2nd ▼	PES	S&D
2024	4,341,686 ▲	48.55 ▲	11 / 33 ▲	1st (within CNR)^{3} ▲	PES	S&D

Notes

^{1} Alliance PSD+PC members: PSD and PC (1 MEP).
^{2} Social Democratic Union (USD) members: PSD, PC (2 MEPs), and UNPR (2 MEPs).
^{3} National Coalition for Romania members: PSD (11 MEPs) and PNL (8 MEPs).

== Controversies ==
Political opponents have criticised PSD for harbouring former Romanian Communist Party (PCR) officials, and for allegedly attempting to control the Romanian mass media. By 2009, a number of its incumbent or former senior members have also been accused of corruption, interfering in the judiciary and using their political positions for personal enrichment. As of 2015, founding member Ion Iliescu is facing prosecution on charges of crimes against humanity for his role in the June 1990 Mineriad, while former president Liviu Dragnea was convicted for electoral fraud and for instigation to the abuse of public office and being indicted for forming an "organised criminal group" in 2018. That same year, former president Victor Ponta had also been investigated for corruption but was ultimately acquitted. Adrian Năstase temporarily self-suspended himself from the position on 16 January 2006, pending investigation of a scandal provoked by his wealth declaration, where he was accused of corruption. Alleged text transcripts of PSD meetings surfaced on an anonymous website just before the 2004 Romanian general election. Năstase and his ministers are shown talking about political involvement in corruption trials of the government's members, or involvement in suppressing "disobedient" media. Năstase stated that the transcripts were fake, but several party members, including former PSD president and former foreign minister Mircea Geoană, have said they are genuine, though Geoană later retracted his statement. Security expert Iulian Fota stated that PSD is a neocommunist anti-Western party backed by Russia.

Politicians of the party have occasionally employed "utilitarian anti-Semitism", meaning that politicians who may usually not be antisemites played off certain antisemitic prejudices in order to serve their political necessities. On 5 March 2012, PSD Senator Dan Șova, at that time the party spokesman, said on The Money Channel that "no Jew suffered on Romanian territory, thanks to marshal Antonescu." Elie Wiesel National Institute for Studying the Holocaust in Romania expressed its deep disagreement and indignation over the statements of the spokesman of the party. Following public outcry, Șova retracted his statement and issued a public apology; nevertheless, the chairman of the party, Victor Ponta, announced his removal from the office of party spokesman.

Between 2017 and 2019, the party, along with its former junior coalition partners, more specifically the Alliance of Liberals and Democrats (ALDE) and the Democratic Alliance of Hungarians in Romania (UDMR/RMDSZ), had unsuccessfully tried to pass a series of tremendously controversial laws related to the judicial system. In a 2018 preliminary opinion, the Venice Commission stated that the changes could severely undermine the independence of judges and prosecutors in Romania. This unsuccessful endeavour committed by the former PSD–ALDE coalition was the basis for the nationwide 2017–2019 Romanian protests, the largest in the country's entire history thus far.

In 2026 party leader Sorin Grindeanu was seen talking to US ambassador to Greece(former) which days before that stated in a meeting in Greece that she helped possibly bring down the Bolojan Government in Romania.After it was revealed the meeting became a big scandal in Romania to the point when USR deputy Alexandru Paul Dimitriu made cases on Sorin Grindeanu and other PSD leaders of national betrayal.In a later investigation made by indepedent journalists it was discovered that former energy minister Bogdan Ivan wanted to buy American Oil transported from Greece to Romania which was way more expensive then any other.After Bogdan Ivan sent a ministerial control at ROMGAZ for it s refusal of buying American Oil.

== See also ==
- Politics of Romania
