= Conservative Party (Romania) =

Conservative Party Partidul Conservator
- President: Daniel Constantin
- Secretary-General: Damian Florea
- Founder: Dan Voiculescu
- Founded: 18 December 1991
- Dissolved: 19 June 2015
- Preceded by: Conservative Party (claimed, not legal predecessor)
- Merged into: Alliance of Liberals and Democrats
- Succeeded by: Social Liberal Humanist Party (faction)
- Headquarters: Calea Victoriei, 118; Bucharest
- Membership (2014): 55,000
- Ideology: Social conservatism National conservatism Liberal conservatism Before 2005: Humanism; Social liberalism Social democracy
- Political position: Centre-right; Before 2005: Centre
- National affiliation: Social Democratic Pole of Romania (2000–03); National Union (2004); Alliance PSD+PC (2008–10); Centre Right Alliance (2010–13); Social Liberal Union (2010–14); Social Democratic Union (2014–15)
- European affiliation: European People's Party
- European Parliament group: Progressive Alliance of Socialists and Democrats
- Colours: Blue

Website
- www.partidulconservator.ro

The Conservative Party (Romanian: Partidul Conservator, PC) was a conservative political party in Romania. It was founded in 1991, approximately two years after the fall of Communism in Romania, originally under the name Romanian Humanist Party (Romanian: Partidul Umanist Român, PUR). From 2005 until 3 December 2006, the party was a junior member of the Government of Romania. The party adopted the name Conservative Party on 7 May 2005. Subsequently, a little bit more than a decade after, more specifically in June 2015, it merged with the Liberal Reformist Party (PLR) to form the Alliance of Liberals and Democrats (ALDE).

The Conservative Party (PC) stated that it promoted tradition, family, social solidarity, European integration, and a nationalism without chauvinism. It claimed the heritage of the historical Romanian Conservative Party, one of the two main political forces in Romania before the First World War. There was no direct, uninterrupted link between the two parties—the historical Conservative Party was dissolved after World War I—but the modern party sustained and embraced the values of the historical one.

== History ==
The Conservative Party was founded as the Romanian Humanist Party (PUR) on 18 December 1991 and was for a time a member of the Humanist International. It changed its name in 2005 to reflect a shift in its ideology from centrist politics to more conservative, right-wing politics. The party was founded by former well known Securitatea collaborator and informer Dan Voiculescu, a post-1989 wealthy businessman who formally gave control of his companies to relatives. Voiculescu was the founder and former owner of an important media chain comprising among others the top-ranking TV channel Antena 1 and the newspapers Jurnalul Naţional and Gazeta Sporturilor. According to CNA (the state agency for broadcast licensing), he retains significant influence in the Romanian mass media, either through his foundation or through his family.

The party generally supported the interests of the Romanian middle class and especially those of small and middle-size business owners, and performed better electorally at a local level than at a national level. The PUR formed a coalition with the PDSR (now the Social Democratic Party), which won the 2000 general election. The PUR took part in the government under the condition of having the opportunity to promote the interests of its electorate. A Ministry for Small and Medium-Sized Enterprises was thus formed, under the leadership of a PUR representative. After two years, the senior partner of the coalition, the PDSR, decided to suppress this Ministry, and consequently the PUR withdrew from the government.

In the local elections of June 2004, the PUR obtained 6% of the votes and, among others, managed to win in one important city, Bacău. During this election, the party strongly attacked the PSD and its alleged system of "local barons". After the surprising alliance of PUR with PSD, Romeo Stavarache, the mayor of Bacău, switched to the National Liberal Party (PNL) after a disagreement with Voiculescu, saying that he found it impossible to cooperate with the "local barons" he had struggled to defeat.

In the 2004 parliamentary election the PUR again formed an electoral alliance with the PSD. This was a surprising move, as the PUR had strongly attacked the PSD in the June local elections. However, it ensured that the PUR would be able to enter the parliament on the coattails of the much larger party. The elections gave a slight parliamentary plurality to the PSD-PUR coalition, while the new president Traian Băsescu came from the other major competing coalition, the Justice and Truth Alliance (DA), formed by the PNL and Democratic Party (PD). This situation threatened a major political crisis, the President being unwilling to appoint a prime minister from the slightly larger parliamentary bloc, and the DA candidate for prime minister liable not to be ratified by the Parliament, which would have resulted in new parliamentary elections.

Although initial talks assured the support of PUR for the Justice and Truth, without them joining the government, the election of PSD members Adrian Năstase and Nicolae Văcăroiu as Heads of Chambers in the Romanian Parliament, prompted the members of DA to invite PUR to join the government. Although he had been the main advocate of this solution and had strongly pleaded for it, president Băsescu later qualified the solution as "immoral". In return, the conservatives labelled the President as a "hypocrite".

Voiculescu has admitted having been a collaborator with the Securitate, Romania's communist-era internal intelligence service, after information to this effect was released publicly by Romania's National Council for the Study of the Securitate Archives. He has actively denied that his collaboration was harmful to any individual. He was initially named to be a Vice Premier in the government of Prime Minister of Călin Popescu-Tăriceanu but was ultimately not allowed to take the position because of his involvement with the former intelligence service.

On 7 May 2005, the party adopted the name Conservative Party to reflect a change of doctrine from centrism to a more conservative stance. However, its ideology remained fluid, since it supported certain leftist positions, such as increasing corporate taxation.

In 2005, the party organised a march "for family values" as a reaction to Bucharest Pride. The party was opposed to the legalisation of same-sex marriage, even though Octavian Petrovici, a vice-president of the party's Bucharest division, stated in 2006 that the party "respects the choice" of same-sex couples.

The party also supported the introduction of compulsory religious education in Romanian schools (currently, such classes are optional).

On 12 February 2006, the Romanian National Unity Party was absorbed into the Conservative Party.

On 3 December 2006, the party quit the governing coalition and went into opposition. It continued to perform poorly in opinion polls and faced the prospect of being unlikely to enter parliament at the 2008 general election unless it entered into another pact with either the PSD or the PNL.

On 17 April 2008, the Social Democratic Party and the Conservative Party announced they would form a political alliance for the 2008 local election.

In the 2008 legislative election, the Conservative Party also took part in an alliance with PSD, and won 1 seat in the Senate and 4 seats in the Chamber of Deputies. Before that, the Conservatives had proposed an alliance with the Greater Romania Party (PRM). The PRM leader emphatically rejected the offer, as it was presumed that PRM would be absorbed by the Conservative Party. Similarly, the party ran in the 2009 European election in a coalition with the PSD, called National Union PSD+PC, and won 1 MEP seat (George Sabin Cutaș).

On 5 February 2011, the PC joined the Social Liberal Union (USL) along with the PSD and PNL. The USL dissolved on 25 February 2014 upon the exit of the PNL from the alliance.

On 19 June 2015, the Conservative Party merged with the Liberal Reformist Party (PLR) to form the Alliance of Liberals and Democrats (ALDE) party.

== Notable members ==
- Dan Voiculescu – founder and former president
- Codruț Șereș
- George Copos
- Dan Tanasă
- Codrin Ștefănescu

== Electoral history ==
=== Legislative elections ===
Election	Chamber			Senate			Position	Aftermath
Election	Votes	%	Seats	Votes	%	Seats	Position	Aftermath
1992	22,908	0.21	0 / 341	16,484	0.15	0 / 143	25th (as PUR)	Extra-parliamentary supporting the government
1996	106,069	0.87	0 / 343	118,859	0.97	0 / 143	12th (within UNC)^{1}	Extra-parliamentary opposition
2000	3,968,464	36.61	6 / 345	4,040,212	37.09	4 / 140	1st (within PDSR)^{2}	PDSR minority government (with UDMR support)
2004	3,730,352	36.61	19 / 332	3,798,607	36.30	11 / 137	1st (within PSD+PUR)^{3}	DA-PUR^{4}-UDMR government (until April 2007)
2004	3,730,352	36.61	19 / 332	3,798,607	36.30	11 / 137	1st (within PSD+PUR)^{3}	Opposition to a minority PNL-UDMR government
2008	2,279,449	33.10	4 / 334	2,352,968	34.16	1 / 137	2nd (within PSD+PC)^{5}	Opposition to PDL-PSD government (until December 2009)
2008	2,279,449	33.10	4 / 334	2,352,968	34.16	1 / 137	2nd (within PSD+PC)^{5}	Opposition to PDL-UNPR-UDMR (until May 2012)
2008	2,279,449	33.10	4 / 334	2,352,968	34.16	1 / 137	2nd (within PSD+PC)^{5}	USL government (until December 2012)
2012	4,344,288	58.63	13 / 412	4,457,526	60.10	8 / 176	1st (within USL)^{6}	USL government (until March 2014)
2012	4,344,288	58.63	13 / 412	4,457,526	60.10	8 / 176	1st (within USL)^{6}	PSD-UNPR-UDMR-PC government (until December 2014)
2012	4,344,288	58.63	13 / 412	4,457,526	60.10	8 / 176	1st (within USL)^{6}	PSD-UNPR-ALDE^{7} government (until November 2015)
2012	4,344,288	58.63	13 / 412	4,457,526	60.10	8 / 176	1st (within USL)^{6}	Supporting Cioloș Cabinet (Ind.)

Notes:

^{1} National Union of the Centre (UNC) members: PDAR, MER, and PUR.
^{2} Social Democratic Pole of Romania members: PDSR (59 senators and 139 deputies), PSDR (2 senators and 10 deputies), and PUR (4 senators and 6 deputies).
^{3} National Union PSD+PUR members: PSD (46 senators and 113 deputies) and PUR (11 senators and 19 deputies).
^{4} Soon after the elections, PUR broke the alliance and switched sides, joining Justice and Truth Alliance (DA).
^{5} Alliance PSD+PC members: PSD (48 senators and 110 deputies) and PC (1 senator and 4 deputies).
^{6} USL was an alliance of two smaller alliances: Centre Left Alliance (between PSD and UNPR) and Centre Right Alliance (between PNL and PC). Centre Left Alliance: PSD (58 senators and 149 deputies) and UNPR (5 senators and 10 deputies); Centre Right Alliance: PNL (51 senators and 101 deputies) and PC (8 senators and 13 deputies).
^{7} ALDE was created in June 2015 from a merger of PLR (a splinter of PNL) and PC.

=== Presidential elections ===
Election	Candidate	First round			Second round		
Election	Candidate	Votes	Percentage	Position	Votes	Percentage	Position
1996	Ion Pop de Popa	59,752	0.5%	10th			
2000	Ion Iliescu^{1}	4,076,273	36.4%	1st	6,696,623	66.8%	1st
2004	Adrian Năstase^{2}	4,278,864	40.9%	1st	4,881,520	48.8%	2nd
2014	Victor Ponta^{3}	3,836,093	40.4%	1st	5,264,383	45.6%	2nd

Notes:

^{1} Ion Iliescu was a member of PDSR, but endorsed by Social Democratic Pole of Romania (same acronym as the main party: PDSR), an alliance made of PDSR, PSDR, and PC.

^{2} Adrian Năstase was a member of PSD, but endorsed by National Union PSD+PUR, an alliance made of PSD and PC.

^{3} Victor Ponta was a member of PSD, but endorsed by an alliance made of PSD, UNPR, and PC.

=== European elections ===
Election	Votes	Percentage	MEPs	Position	EU Party	EP Group
2007	150,385	2.93%	0 / 35	9th	ALDE	—N/a
2009	1,504,218	31.07%	1 / 33	1st (within PSD+PC)^{1}	PES	S&D
2014	2,093,237	37.60%	2 / 32	1st (within USD)^{2}	PES	S&D

Notes:

^{1} Alliance PSD+PC members: PSD (10 MEPs) and PC.

^{2} Social Democratic Union (USD) members: PSD (12 MEPs), PC, and UNPR (2 MEPs).
