= Justice and Truth Alliance =

Justice and Truth Alliance Alianța Dreptate și Adevăr (D.A. PNL-PD)
- Last leader: Călin Popescu-Tăriceanu (PNL); Emil Boc (PD)
- Founded: 29 September 2003
- Dissolved: 5 April 2007
- Ideology: Liberalism (PNL); Christian democracy (PD)
- Political position: Centre-right
- Colours: Blue (Note: Yellow and Blue; solely during the 2004 local elections' campaign)

Website
- www.dapnl-pd.ro

The Justice and Truth Alliance (originally in Romanian: Alianța Dreptate și Adevăr; or D.A. for short, meaning "yes" in Romanian) was a political alliance comprising two political parties in Romania, namely the centre-right liberal National Liberal Party (PNL) and the initially left-wing Democratic Party (PD), which later switched to center-right ideology.

Although the National Union PSD+PUR had won the largest number of seats in the Parliament, the Justice and Truth Alliance formed the government from 2004 to 2007 in a coalition with the Democratic Alliance of Hungarians in Romania (UDMR/RMDSZ) and the Conservative Party (PUR), which had changed sides after DA's candidate won the presidential elections.

== Background ==
The alliance had its origins in a collaboration between the two parties which began in early 2002 at the initiative of the PNL's former president, Valeriu Stoica. The creation of the alliance was formally approved on 29 September 2003 by the executives of both parties, after months of negotiations between the parties. It was established as a vehicle for of coordinating opposition efforts against the ruling Social Democratic Party (PSD). Its name was chosen in reference to the PSD's alleged corruption - as PNL president Theodor Stolojan put it, "we want the alliance to set us free from corruption and lies."

On 25 October 2004, the Justice and Truth alliance endorsed its co-chairman Călin Popescu-Tăriceanu (at that time also the leader of the PNL) as its leader in the 2004 Romanian general election. According to Popescu-Tăriceanu, the alliance's political priorities were:

- Stimulating investments and private initiative;
- Creating of new jobs and increasing net incomes to alleviate poverty;
- Delivering a "responsible social policy" in the field of education, healthcare, pensions, and social assistance;
- Fighting corruption;
- Establishing a non-political judiciary.

In the 2004 presidential election and the simultaneous legislative election, held on 28 November, the DA polled better than expected in both races. It came within a few percentage points behind the PSD, eliminating the previous government's majority as a result. A new post-electoral alliance was formed between the Justice and Truth (DA), the Democratic Alliance of Hungarians in Romania (UDMR/RMDSZ), and the Conservative Party (PC), forming thus a simple majority (accounting for 54.5% of the seats) which then had the legitimacy to appoint ministers in a new grand coalition government. The protocols of the alliance between DA and UDMR were signed on 20 December 2004 while those between DA and PUR were signed on 23 December 2004.

DA's presidential candidate, Traian Băsescu, won the presidential election and was subsequently the 4th President of Romania. DA, alongside the Democratic Alliance of Hungarians in Romania (UDMR/RMDSZ) and the Humanist Party of Romania (which subsequently became the Conservative Party) both quit the ruling coalition 3 December 2006, consequently leaving the two remaining parties (i.e. PD and PNL) without a simple majority in the Parliament.

During early April 2007, Popescu-Tăriceanu dismissed the Democratic Party (PD) ministers from the government and formed a minority cabinet along with the Democratic Alliance of Hungarians in Romania (UDMR/RMDSZ), thereby marking the end of the alliance.

== Electoral history ==
=== Legislative elections ===
Election	Chamber			Senate			Position	Aftermath
Election	Votes	%	Seats	Votes	%	Seats	Position	Aftermath
2004	3,191,546	31.33	112 / 332	3,250,663	31.77	49 / 137	2nd ^{1}	DA-PUR-UDMR/RMDSZ (2004–2007)
2004	3,191,546	31.33	112 / 332	3,250,663	31.77	49 / 137	2nd ^{1}	PNL-UDMR minority government (2007–2008)

Notes:

^{1} Justice and Truth Alliance members: PNL (28 senators and 64 deputies) and PD (21 senators and 48 deputies).

=== Presidential elections ===
Election	Candidate	First round			Second round		
Election	Candidate	Votes	Percentage	Position	Votes	Percentage	Position
2004	Traian Băsescu	3,545,236	33.9%	2nd	5,126,794	51.2%	1st

== Notable members ==
- Theodor Stolojan (PNL)
- Călin Popescu-Tăriceanu (PNL)
- Traian Băsescu (PD)
- Emil Boc (PD)
