= 2008 Romanian parliamentary election =

- 30 November 2008

All 137 seats in the Senate All 334 seats in the Chamber of Deputies 69 S and 167 D seats needed for a majority
- Turnout: 39.20% (▼19.27pp)
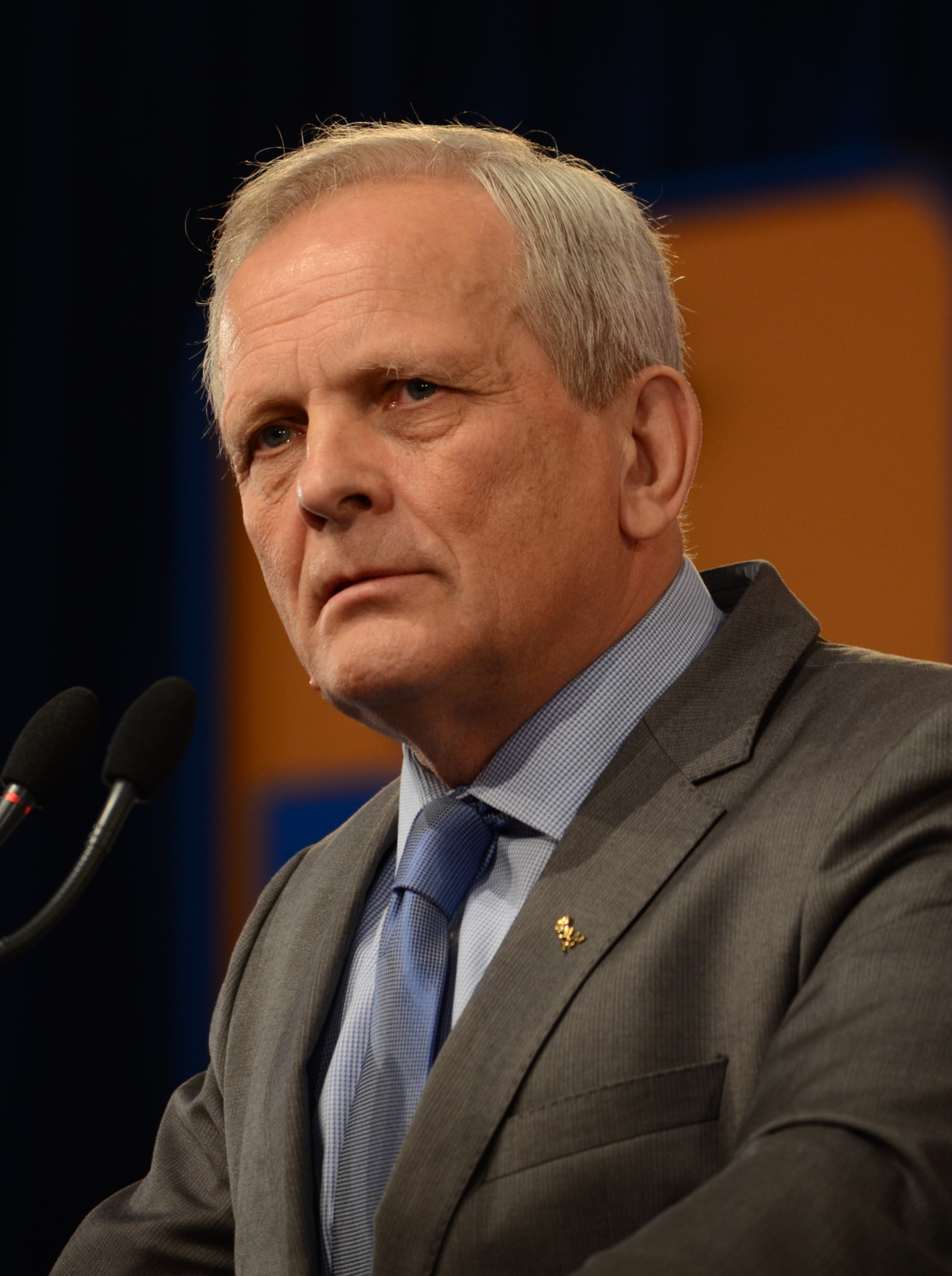

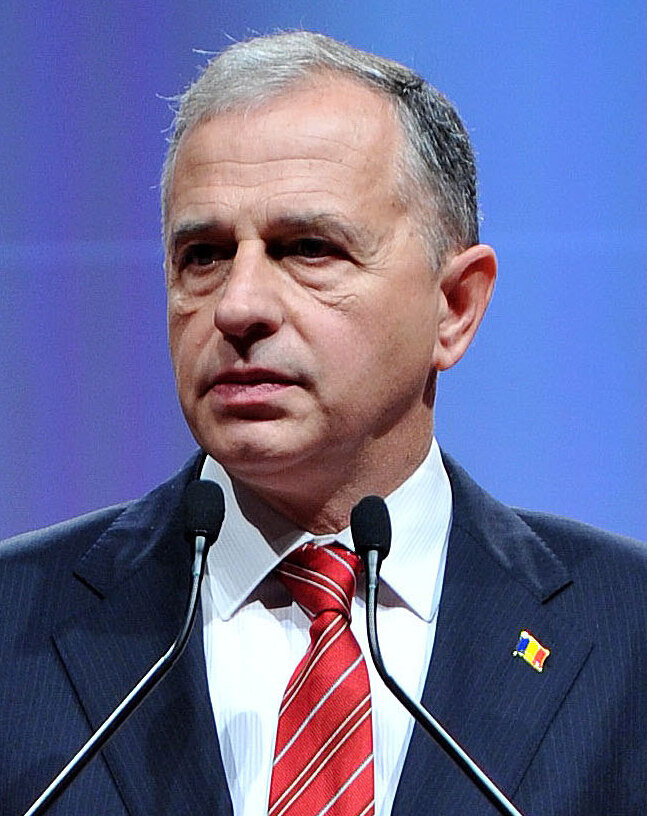

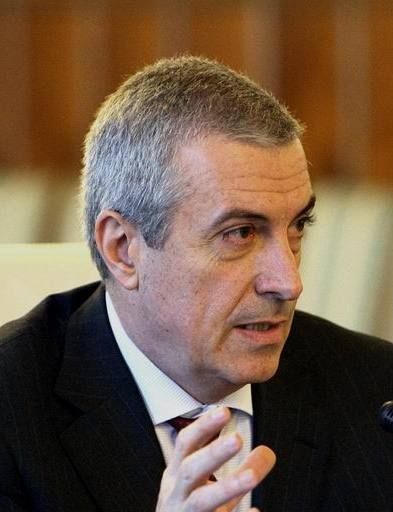

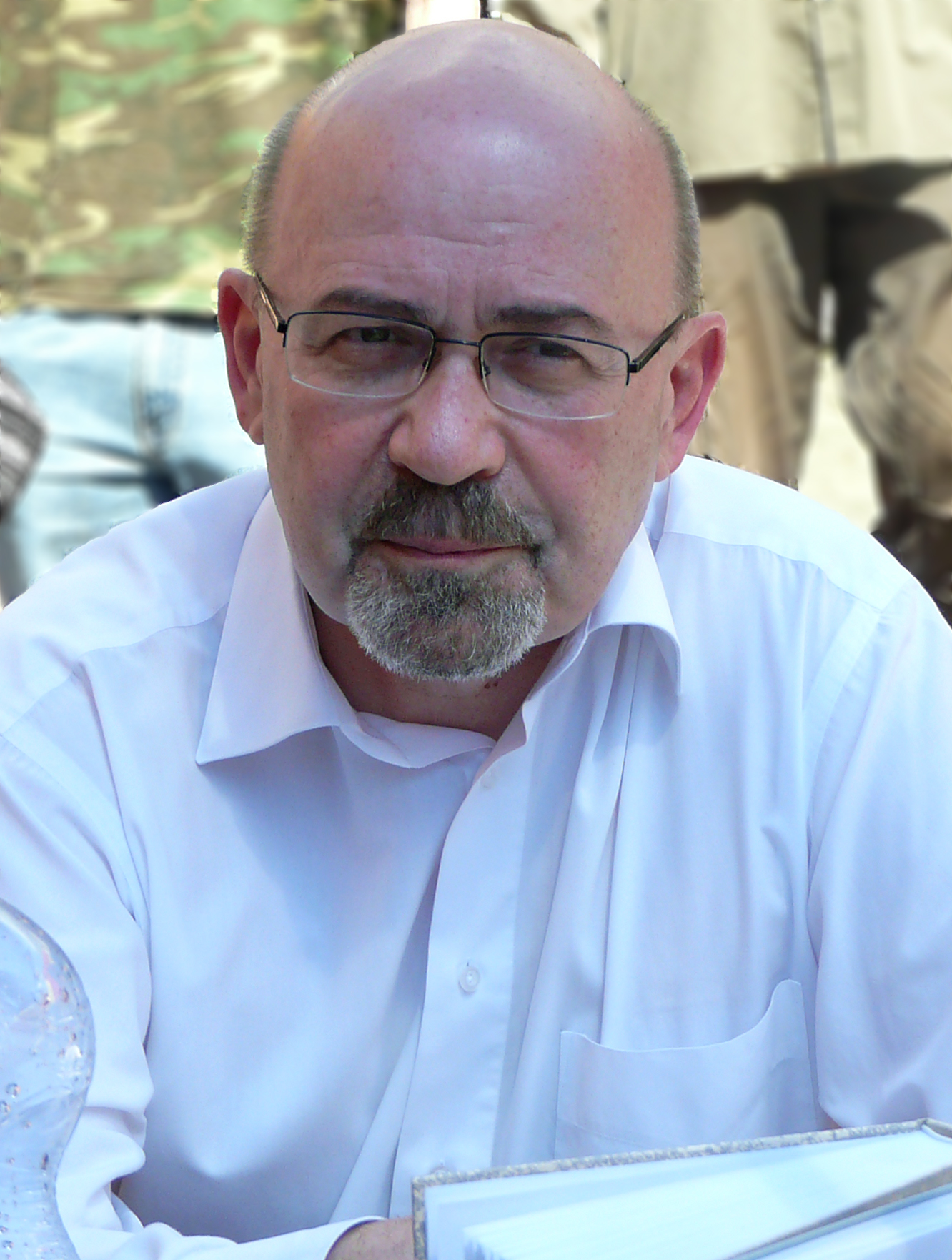

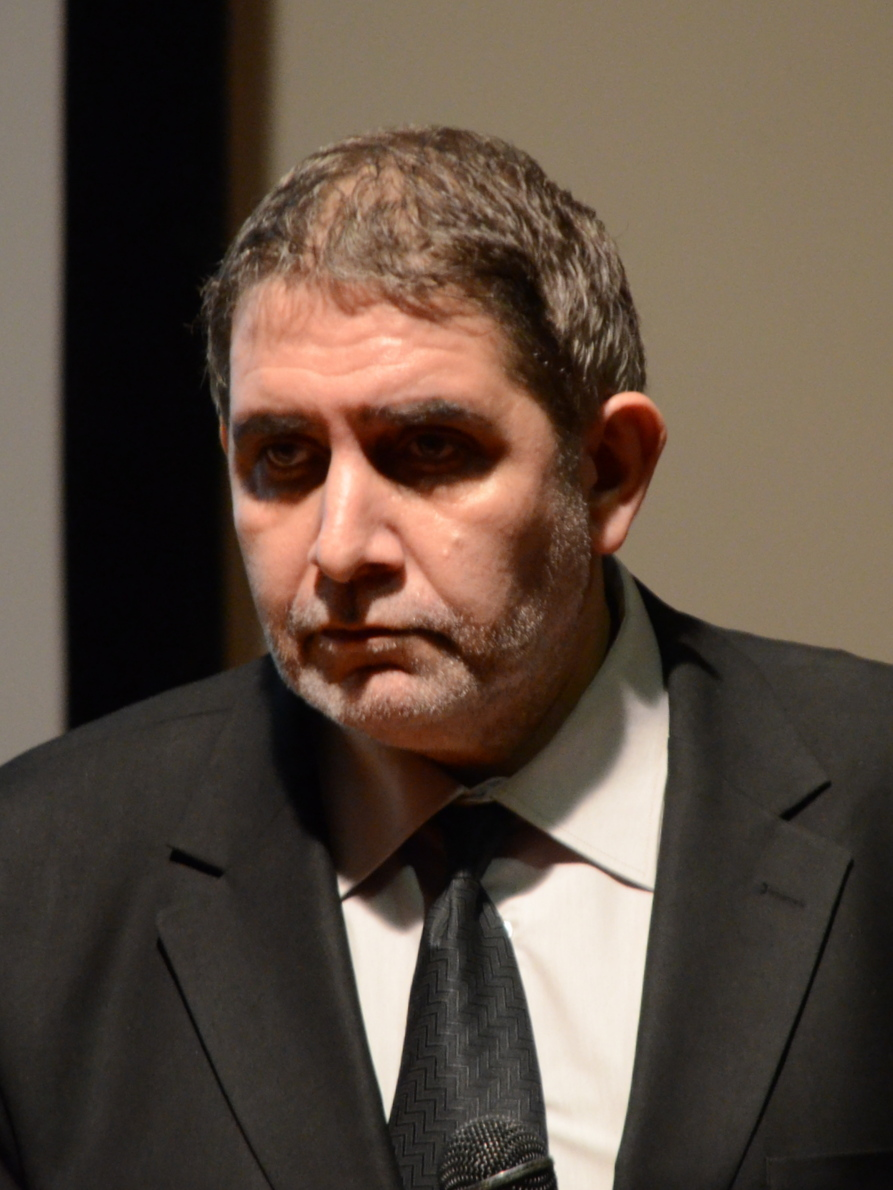
	First party	Second party	Third party
Leader	Theodor Stolojan (Note: Prime Minister candidate)	Mircea Geoană	Călin Popescu-Tăriceanu
Party	PDL	PSD+PC	PNL
Leader's seat	not running	S – Dolj	D – Ilfov
Last election	21 S / 48 D	57 S / 132 D	28 S / 64 D
Seats won	51 S / 115 D	49 S / 114 D	28 S / 65 D
Seat change	▲30 S / ▲67 D	▼8 S / ▼18 D	0 S / ▲1 D
Popular vote	2,228,860 D	2,279,449 D	1,279,063 D
Percentage	32.36% D	33.10% D	18.60% D
	Fourth party	Fifth party
Leader	Béla Markó	Varujan Pambuccian (Note: Pambuccian, a member of the Union of Armenians of Romania, has been the parliamentary leader of the national minorities' group since 1996.)
Party	UDMR/RMDSZ	Romanian ethnic minority parties
Leader's seat	D – Harghita	D - Nationwide (Note: National minorities have nationwide mandates and do not represent a specific county.)
Last election	10 S / 22 D	0 S / 18 D
Seats won	9 S / 22 D	0 S / 18 D
Seat change	▼1 S / 0 D	0 S / 18 D
Popular vote	425,008 D	243,908 D
Percentage	6.17% D	3.45% D
- Results by county
Prime Minister before election
Călin Popescu-Tăriceanu
PNL
Elected Prime Minister
Emil Boc
PDL

Parliamentary elections were held in Romania on 30 November 2008. The Democratic Liberal Party (PDL) won three more seats than PSD in the Chamber of Deputies and the Senate, although the alliance headed by the Social Democratic Party (PSD) won more votes and a fractionally higher vote share. The two parties subsequently formed a governing coalition with Emil Boc of the PDL as Prime Minister.

== Electoral system ==
President Traian Băsescu had wanted to introduce a single-winner two-round electoral system before this election, but a 2007 referendum on the proposal failed due to insufficient turnout. A new electoral system was introduced as a compromise, with the previous party-list proportional representation system changed to a mixed member proportional representation system using sub-county constituencies (colegii electorale). A candidate was declared the winner in any electoral college where they obtained more than 50% of the vote. Seats where no candidate won an outright majority are then allocated using the D'Hondt method. If necessary, the number of seats for each chamber is raised, by giving supplementary seats. An electoral threshold of 5% was applied for each chamber; or winning at least six colleges for the Chamber of Deputies and three colleges for the Senate by more than 50%. There was an additional adjustment for the Chamber of Deputies around the national minorities candidates.

== Contenders ==
The main contenders in the election were the centre-left alliance made up of the Social Democratic Party (PSD) and the Conservative Party (PC); the liberal-conservative Democratic Liberal Party (PDL); and the liberal National Liberal Party (PNL).

Other significant contenders were the ethnic Hungarian party Democratic Alliance of Hungarians in Romania (UDMR/RMDSZ) and the right-wing nationalist Greater Romania Party (PRM), both of whom were represented in the previous Parliament.

== Opinion polls ==
Date	Pollster												
Date	Pollster	PDL	PSD+PC	PSD	PNL	PNG	UDMR	PRM	PC	PNȚCD	PIN	PCM	Undecided
26 June 2008	IMAS	40%	—N/a	26%	18%	5%	5%	3%	—N/a	—N/a	—N/a	—N/a	—N/a
22–30 July 2008	INSOMAR	38%	—N/a	26%	16%	3%	4%	3%	2%	2%	2%	1%	—N/a
25 August–5 September 2008	ATLE	30.2%	—N/a	33.1%	16%	3.2%	4.8%	3.4%	3.1%	1.1%	2%	—N/a	—N/a
1–16 September 2008	Metro-Media	37%	—N/a	28%	17%	3%	5%	5%	3%	1%	3%	—N/a	—N/a
12–17 September 2008	INSOMAR	39%	—N/a	25%	20%	3%	4%	4%	1%	—N/a	—N/a	1%	—N/a
22–25 September 2008	CCSB	34%	36%	—N/a	20%	2%	5%	3%	—N/a	1%	—N/a	—N/a	—N/a
10–23 October 2008	CURS	32%	31%	—N/a	18%	5%	5%	5%	—N/a	1%	1%	—N/a	—N/a
25–27 October 2008	CCSB	34%	37%	—N/a	18%	2%	6%	3%	—N/a	—N/a	—N/a	—N/a	—N/a
30 October–3 November 2008	INSOMAR	37%	32%	—N/a	17%	3%	6%	5%	—N/a	—N/a	—N/a	—N/a	—N/a
11 November 2008	CCSB	34.5%	37.7%	—N/a	14.4%	2.3%	6.6%	4.0%	—N/a	—N/a	—N/a	—N/a	—N/a
10–14 November 2008	BCS	34.4%	31.8%	—N/a	19.9%	1.9%	5.1%	3.6%	—N/a	—N/a	—N/a	—N/a	25.5%
17–21 November 2008	BCS	32.6%	31.2%	—N/a	21.4%	2.9%	6.1%	4.1%	—N/a	—N/a	—N/a	—N/a	29.5%
21–23 November 2008	INSOMAR	32%	35%	—N/a	21%	3%	5%	3%	—N/a	—N/a	—N/a	—N/a	—N/a
19–23 November 2008	CSOP	34%	31%	—N/a	21%	3%	7%	3%	—N/a	—N/a	—N/a	—N/a	27%
23–26 November 2008	BCS	31.1%	32%	—N/a	21.3%	3.2%	6.3%	4.3%	—N/a	—N/a	—N/a	—N/a	26%

The first exit-polls, published by INSOMAR after the polls were closed, predicted the results for the Chamber of Deputies as:

PSD+PC - 36.2%;
PDL - 30.3%;
PNL - 20.4%;
UDMR - 6.7%.

And for the Senate:

PSD+PC - 35.9%;
PDL - 31.1%;
PNL - 19.9%;
UDMR - 6.7%.

== Results ==
The results for the Chamber of Deputies for Constituencies no. 1 to no. 42

The results for the Chamber of Deputies for Constituency no. 43

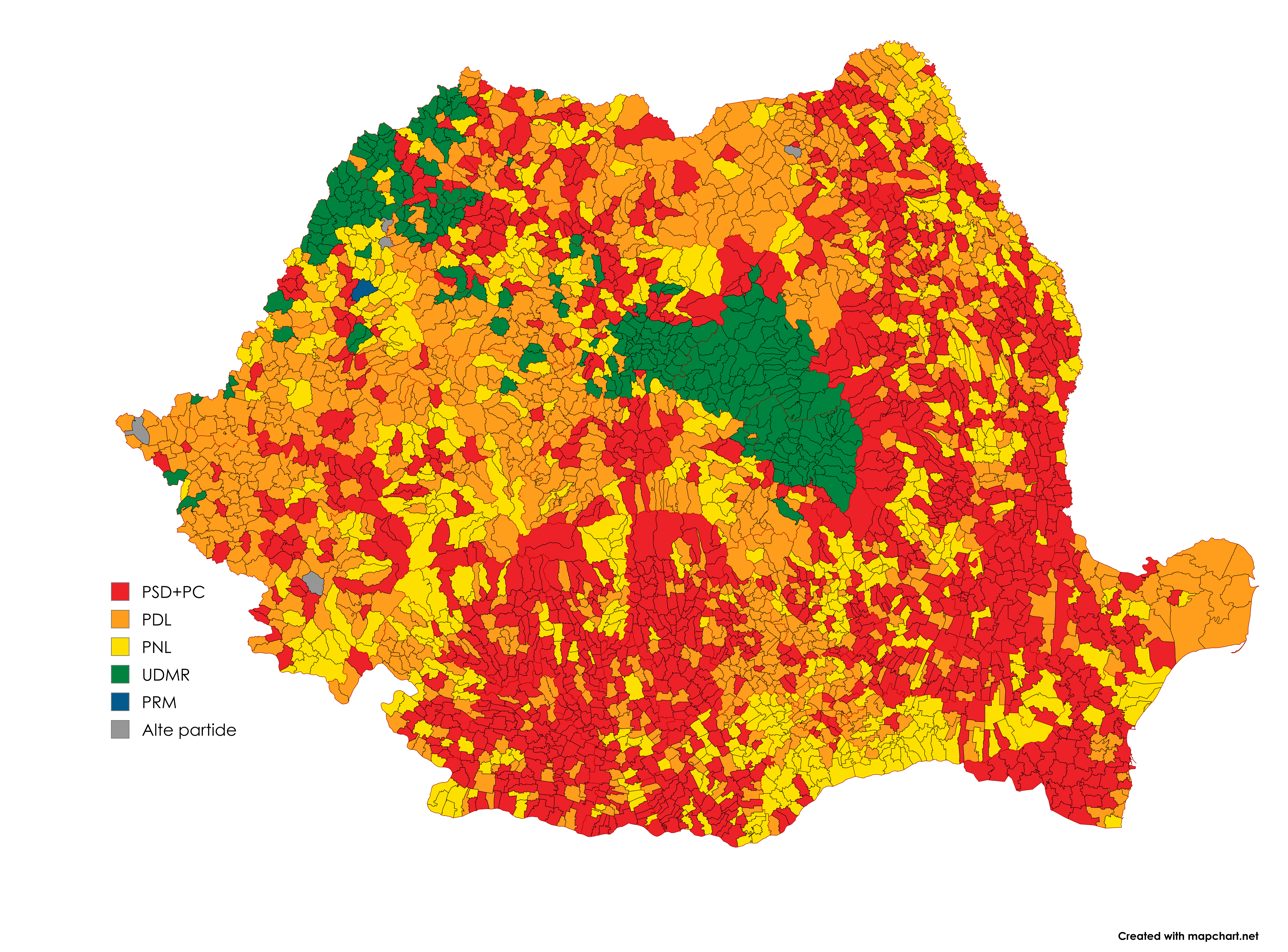
Results of the 2008 Romanian legislative elections, showing the number of votes for the party that won a plurality in each locality. Results for the Chamber of Deputies.

The results for the Senate for Constituencies no. 1 to no. 42

The results for the Senate for Constituency no. 43

According to the official final results, the centre-left Alliance PSD+PC won 33.1% in the Chamber of Deputies, just ahead of the Democratic Liberal Party (PDL) on 32.4%, with the National Liberal Party (PNL) on 18.6% and the Democratic Alliance of Hungarians in Romania (UDMR/RMDSZ) on 6.2%. The alliance led by the Social Democratic Party (PSD) won 34.2% in the Senate, just ahead of the Democratic Liberal Party (PDL) on 33.6%, with the National Liberal Party (PNL) on 18.7% and the Democratic Alliance of Hungarians in Romania (UDMR/RMDSZ) on 6.4%.

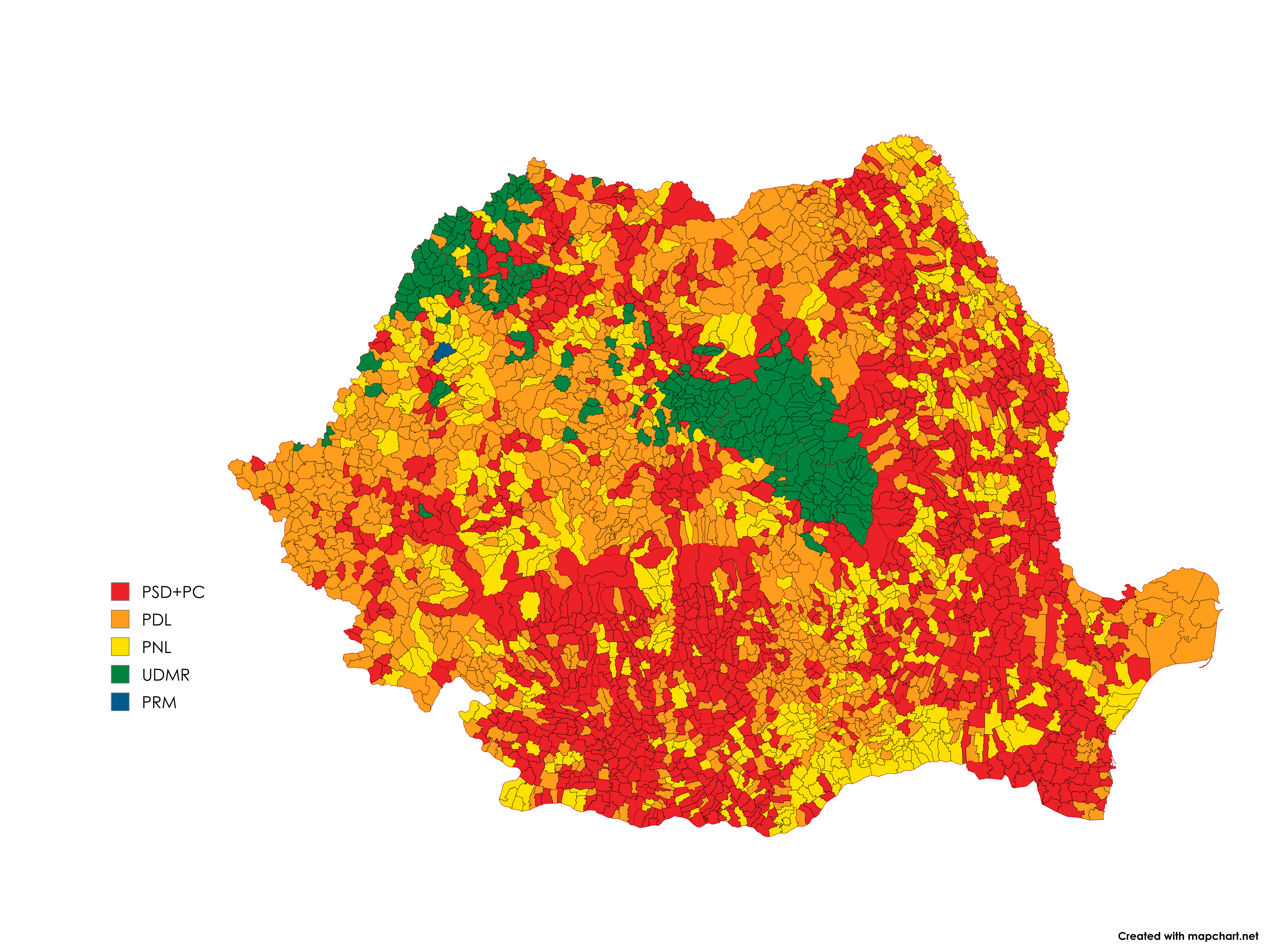
Results of the 2008 Romanian legislative elections, showing the number of votes for the party that won a plurality in each locality. Results for the Senate

Compared to the 2004 election, the Social Democratic Party-led alliance fell back a few percents in the national vote share. The Democratic Liberal Party (PDL) and National Liberal Party (PNL) had competed in the last election together as the Justice and Truth Alliance (DA), but had split in April 2007.

The Democratic Liberal Party (PDL) made significant gains in 2008 to become the largest party in both houses, while the National Liberal Party (PNL) made smaller gains. Support for the Democratic Alliance of Hungarians in Romania (UDMR/RMDSZ) was largely unchanged. The Greater Romania Party (PRM) obtained 13% of the national vote for the Chamber in 2004, but failed in 2008 to pass the 5% electoral threshold.

=== Senate ===
Party	Votes	%	Seats	+/–
Alliance PSD+PC	2,352,968	34.16	49	–8
Democratic Liberal Party	2,312,358	33.57	51	+30
National Liberal Party	1,291,029	18.74	28	0
Democratic Alliance of Hungarians in Romania	440,449	6.39	9	–1
Greater Romania Party	245,930	3.57	0	–21
New Generation Party	174,519	2.53	0	0
Green Ecologist Party	48,119	0.70	0	0
Social Protection People's Party	10,805	0.16	0	New
National Democratic Christian Party	1,365	0.02	0	0
Romanian Socialist Party	445	0.01	0	0
Independents	10,068	0.15	0	0
Total	6,888,055	100.00	137	0
Valid votes	6,888,055	95.15		
Invalid/blank votes	350,816	4.85		
Total votes	7,238,871	100.00		
Registered voters/turnout	18,464,274	39.20		
Source: Nohlen & Stöver Central Election Office

=== Chamber of Deputies ===
Party	Votes	%	Seats	+/–
Alliance PSD+PC	2,279,449	33.10	114	–18
Democratic Liberal Party	2,228,860	32.36	115	+67
National Liberal Party	1,279,063	18.57	65	+1
Democratic Alliance of Hungarians in Romania	425,008	6.17	22	0
Greater Romania Party	217,595	3.16	0	–48
New Generation Party	156,901	2.28	0	0
Party of the Roma "Pro Europe"	44,037	0.64	1	0
Democratic Forum of Germans	23,190	0.34	1	0
Federation of the Jewish Communities in Romania	22,393	0.33	1	0
Green Ecologist Party	18,279	0.27	0	0
Democratic Union of Slovaks and Czechs of Romania	15,373	0.22	1	0
Bulgarian Union of Banat–Romania	14,039	0.20	1	0
Union of Armenians of Romania	13,829	0.20	1	0
Democratic Union of Turkish-Muslim Tatars	11,868	0.17	1	0
Association of Macedonians of Romania	11,814	0.17	1	0
Union of Serbs of Romania	10,878	0.16	1	0
Association of Italians of Romania	9,567	0.14	1	0
Democratic Turkish Union of Romania	9,481	0.14	1	0
Union of the Ukrainians of Romania	9,338	0.14	1	0
Community of the Lipovan Russians	9,203	0.13	1	0
Union of Croats of Romania	9,047	0.13	1	0
Hellenic Union of Romania	8,875	0.13	1	0
League of Albanians of Romania	8,792	0.13	1	0
Social Protection People's Party	8,388	0.12	0	New
Union of Poles of Romania	7,670	0.11	1	0
Cultural Union of Ruthenians of Romania	4,514	0.07	1	0
Romanian Socialist Party	585	0.01	0	0
National Democratic Christian Party	316	0.00	0	0
Party of the European Romania	87	0.00	0	New
Independents	28,355	0.41	0	0
Total	6,886,794	100.00	334	+2
Valid votes	6,886,794	95.14		
Invalid/blank votes	352,077	4.86		
Total votes	7,238,871	100.00		
Registered voters/turnout	18,464,274	39.20		
Source: Nohlen & Stöver Central Election Office

== Aftermath ==
=== Government formation ===
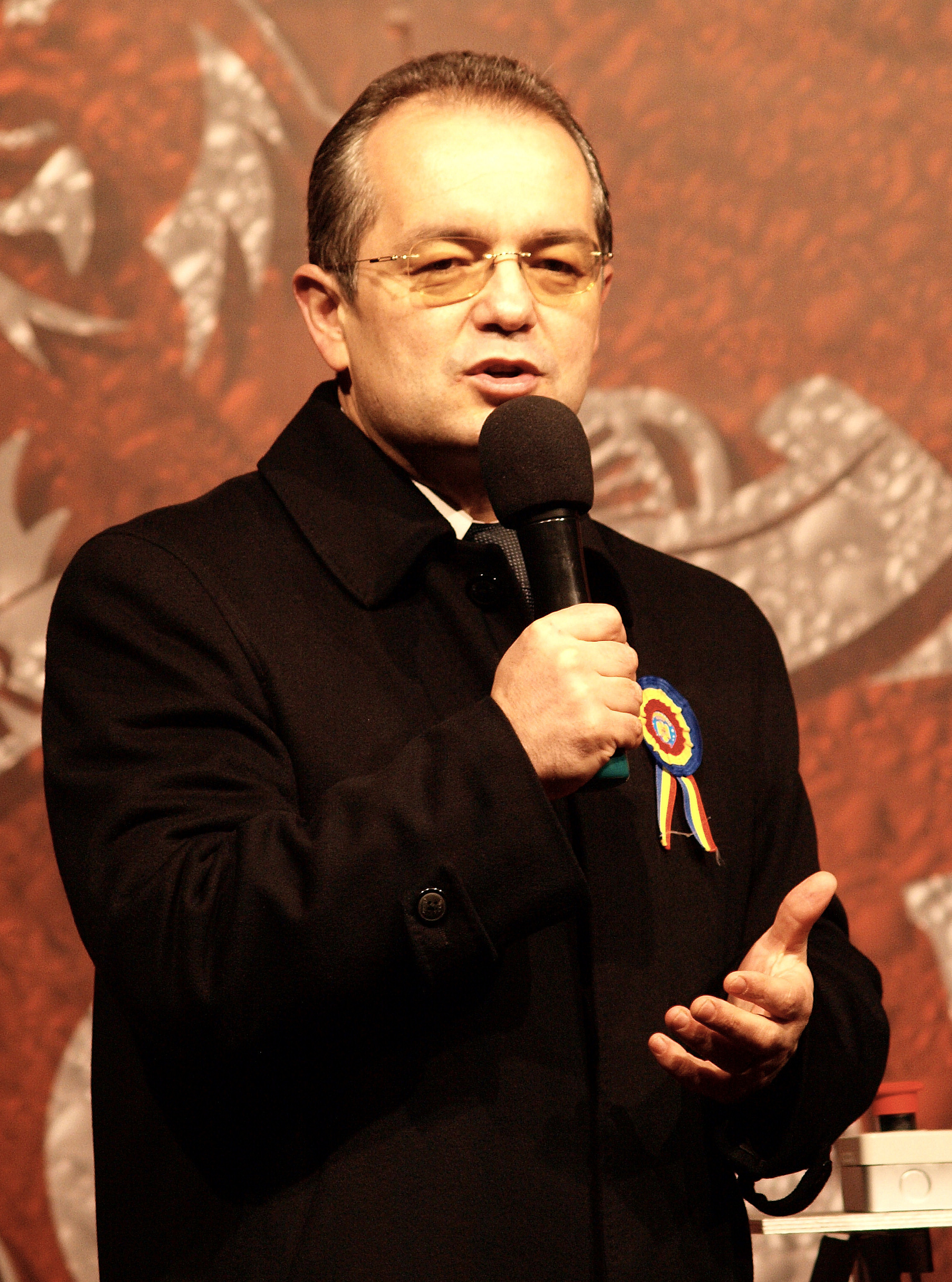
Second Prime Minister Designate, Emil Boc speaking.

It was expected that a grand coalition of the Social Democrats and the Democratic Liberal Party (PDL) would be formed. Initially the Prime Minister-designate was Theodor Stolojan, the PDL's official candidate. He was designated Prime Minister by the President Traian Băsescu on 11 December 2008, the official decree being issued and printed in the Monitorul Oficial the next day.

On 15 December 2008, four days after his nomination, and one day after the coalition protocol was signed, Stolojan announced that he had resigned from the position of Prime Minister-designate, without giving any reason. The same day, Băsescu signed a decree that nominated the Mayor of Cluj-Napoca and PDL president Emil Boc.

Boc's coalition government with the Social Democrats was approved by parliament in a 324–115 vote and was sworn in on 22 December 2008. Mircea Geoana of the Social Democrats became the new head of the Senate, with Roberta Alma Anastase of the PDL as the new President of the Chamber of Deputies.

=== By-elections ===
At the start of the 2008–2012 parliamentary term, only parties that had won seats in the 2008 elections were eligible to contest parliamentary by-elections. However, this changed in 2011, after which all parties were allowed to propose candidates. The change came after repeated contests to the Constitutional Court of Romania of former 2009 presidential candidate Remus Cernea.

Following the nomination of Bogdan Olteanu to the Council of Administration of the National Bank of Romania as Deputy Governor, the first by-election of the parliamentary term took place in Bucharest constituency 1 will be held the first by-election of this parliament. The election was held on 17 January 2010 and was a contest between Radu Stroe of the National Liberal Party (PNL) and Honorius Prigoană, representing the PDL. The Social Democrats decided not to propose a candidate and to support the PNL candidate. Stroe was subsequently elected.

Daniela Popa resigned from the Chamber of Deputies to take office as President of the Insurance Supervising Committee, also stepping down as president of the Conservative Party. The PNL decided not to have its own candidate, but to support the PSD+PC candidate, based on the gentlemen's agreement for the Bucharest by-election. The PSD nominated Conservative Party member and former Romanian Lottery director Liliana Mincă, with the PDL putting forward former TV show host Teo Trandafir, who went on to win.

Following the death of Ioan Timiş, Deputy for Hunedoara County constituency 3, a by-election took place on 28 November 2010. All parties nominated candidates, with former Minister of Labour, Mariana Câmpeanu of the PNL winning.

In January 2011, the representative of the Macedonians in Romania, Liana Dumitrescu, died. As she was a representative of a national minority, her seat had no college. As a result, her seat was left empty.

In April 2011 Victor Surdu died, vacating his seat in the Chamber of Deputies, Neamț County constituency 6. The by-election was held on 21 August 2011 and won by the PDL candidate, Adrian Rădulescu, Secretary of State in the Ministry of Agriculture.

In May 2011, Cătălin Cherecheș was elected Mayor of Baia Mare, automatically vacating her seat in the Chamber of Deputies, Maramureș County constituency 2. The by-election on 21 August saw Florin Tătaru of the Social Liberal Union elected.

On 30 August 2011, Zoltán Pálfi died, vacacting Cluj County constituency 9.

Summary of the Romanian legislative by-election results for the 2008 - 2012 legislature (LIII)
Date	College - Constituency	Candidates	Parties and alliances	Votes	%
17 January 2010	CD 1-42	Radu Stroe	National Liberal Party (Partidul Naţional Liberal)	7,625	70.17%
17 January 2010	CD 1-42	Honorius Prigoană	Democratic Liberal Party (Partidul Democrat-Liberal)	3,242	29.83%
17 January 2010	Total valid votes (40,583 expected voters) (turnout 27.12% - 11,006)			10,867	100.00%
17 January 2010	Source: Biroul Electoral Municipal Archived 4 September 2020 at the Wayback Machine				
25 April 2010	CD 19-42	Teo Trandafir	Democratic Liberal Party (Partidul Democrat-Liberal)		53.59%
25 April 2010	CD 19-42	Liliana Mincă	PSD+PC Electoral Alliance (Alianţa Electorală PSD+PC)		46.41%
25 April 2010	Total valid votes (103,204 expected voters) (turnout 14.84%)			15,093	100.00%
25 April 2010	Source: Autoritatea Electorală Permanentă Archived 13 March 2012 at the Wayback Machine				
28 November 2010	CD 3-22	Mariana Câmpeanu	National Liberal Party (Partidul Naţional Liberal)	8,738	34.86%
28 November 2010	CD 3-22	Daniel Răducanu	Democratic Liberal Party (Partidul Democrat-Liberal)	7,339	29.28%
28 November 2010	CD 3-22	Ţoloaș Liliana	PSD+PC Electoral Alliance (Alianţa Electorală PSD+PC)	5,218	20.81%
28 November 2010	CD 3-22	Nicolae Timiș	Independent	2,683	10.70%
28 November 2010	CD 3-22	Bela Fülöp	Democratic Union of Hungarians in Romania (Uniunea Democrată Maghiară din România)	438	1.75%
28 November 2010	CD 3-22	Remus Cernea	Independent	269	1.07%
28 November 2010	CD 3-22	Mircea Părăian	New Generation Party – Christian Democratic (Partidul Noua Generaţie - Creştin Democrat)	197	0.78%
28 November 2010	CD 3-22	Iosif Danci	Christian-Democratic National Peasants' Party (Partidul Naţional Ţărănesc Creştin Democrat)	187	0.75%
28 November 2010	Total valid votes (53,222 expected voters) (turnout 48.41% - 25,763)			25,069	100.00%
28 November 2010	Source: Autoritatea Electorală Permanentă Archived 4 March 2016 at the Wayback Machine				
21 August 2011	CD 6-29	Adrian Rădulescu	Democratic Liberal Party (Partidul Democrat-Liberal)	17,186	54.95%
21 August 2011	CD 6-29	Liviu Harbuz	Social-Liberal Union (Uniunea Social Liberală)	14,089	45.05%
21 August 2011	Total valid votes (57,996 expected voters) (turnout 53.93% - 32,184)			31,275	100.00%
21 August 2011	Source: Autoritatea Electorala Permanenta Archived 4 March 2016 at the Wayback Machine				
21 August 2011	CD 2-26	Florin Tătaru	Social-Liberal Union (Uniunea Social Liberală)	9,433	42.67%
21 August 2011	CD 2-26	Mariana Pop	Democratic Liberal Party (Partidul Democrat-Liberal)	7,845	35.48%
21 August 2011	CD 2-26	Mircea Dolha	Ecologist Party of Romania (Partidul Ecologist Român)	4,338	19.62%
21 August 2011	CD 2-26	Felician Horzsa	Greater Romania Party (Partidul România Mare)	493	2.23%
21 August 2011	Total valid votes (79,241 expected voters) (turnout 27,90% - 22,478)			22,109	100.00%
21 August 2011	Source: Biroul Electoral Judeţean Archived 31 March 2012 at the Wayback Machine				
