= 2008–2012 legislature of the Romanian Parliament =

Parliament of Romania LIII legislature
←	2004–2008	2012–2016	→

Overview
- Term: 20 December 2004 – 18 December 2012
- Government: PDL, PSD, PC PDL, UDMR, UNPR PSD, PNL, PC, UNPR
- Opposition: PNL, UDMR PSD, PNL, PC PDL, UDMR

Senate
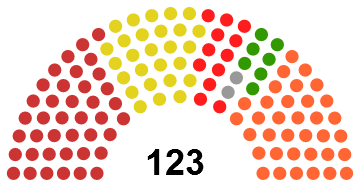
- Political structure of the Senate
- Members: 137
- President of the Senate: Crin Antonescu (3 July 2012 – 18 December 2012) National Liberal Party Vasile Blaga (28 November 2011 – 3 July 2012) Democratic Liberal Party Mircea Geoană (19 December 2008 – 23 November 2011) Social Democratic Party
- Democratic Liberal Party: Cristian Rădulescu
- Social Democratic Party: Ilie Sârbu
- National Liberal Party: Mario Oprea
- Democratic Alliance of Hungarians in Romania: Andras Levente Fekete Szabó
- National Union for the Progress of Romania: Şerban Mihăilescu

Chamber of Deputies
- Political structure of the Chamber of Deputies
- Members: 334
- President of the Chamber of Deputies: Valeriu Zgonea (3 July 2012 – 18 December 2012) Social Democratic Party; Roberta Anastase (19 December 2008 – 3 July 2012) Democratic Liberal Party
- Democratic Liberal Party: Mircea Toader
- Social Democratic Party: Marian Neacşu
- National Liberal Party: Călin Popescu-Tăriceanu
- Democratic Alliance of Hungarians in Romania: András-Levente Máté
- Minorities: Varujan Pambuccian
- National Union for the Progress of Romania: Luminiţa Iordache

Government
- Boc I Cabinet (coalition): Emil Boc (22 December 2008 – 23 December 2009)
- Boc II Cabinet (coalition): Emil Boc; Cătălin Predoiu (29 December 2009 – 9 February 2012)
- Ungureanu Cabinet (coalition): Mihai Răzvan Ungureanu (9 February 2012 – 27 April 2012)
- Ponta (coalition): Victor Ponta (27 April 2012 – 18 December 2012)

Sessions
- 1st: December 2008 – February 2009
- 2nd: February 2009 – September 2009
- 3rd: September 2009 – February 2010
- 4th: February 2010 – September 2010
- 5th: September 2010 – February 2011
- 6th: February 2011 – September 2012
- 7th: September 2012 – December 2012

In Romania's 2008 legislative election, held on 30 November, no party won an outright majority. The Democratic Liberal Party (PDL) won the largest number of seats, closely followed by the Social Democratic Party (PSD) + Conservative Party (PC) Alliance. It was thought that the third-placed National Liberal Party (PNL) would hold the key for the new government. It asked for the position of Prime Minister in its negotiations with the two parties.

In the end, the Democratic Liberal Party (PDL) and Social Democratic Party (PSD) signed a coalition agreement, with Theodor Stolojan as Prime Minister designate. Two days later, inexplicably, Stolojan renounced this designation, and was quickly replaced by Emil Boc, Democratic Liberal Party (PDL) president and still incumbent Mayor of Cluj-Napoca to this day. The National Liberal Party (PNL), Democratic Alliance of Hungarians in Romania (UDMR), and the 18 Minorities Parties formed the Parliamentary Opposition.

The coalition originally had approximately 70% Parliament support, but the Social Democrats (PSD) pulled out of the coalition on 1 October 2009, in protest of the sacking of interior minister Dan Nica, and the government fell in a vote of no confidence on 13 October.

== Senate ==
The President of the Senate for this legislature was Mircea Geoană, former president of the Social Democratic Party (PSD), between 19 December 2008 and 23 November 2011. He was replaced by Vasile Blaga on 28 November 2011. On 3 July 2012, Crin Antonescu replaced Blaga at the Senate Presidency. During Antonescu's tenure as interim President, the business of the Senate was carried by Vice President Petru Filip. Filip switched parties from the Democratic Liberal Party (PDL) to the Social Democratic Party (PSD) during the no confidence vote for the Ungureanu cabinet. He also served as interim President of the Senate between the removal from office of Geoană and Blaga's election in 2011. At that time he was a PDL Vice President.

Seats in the Senate of Romania, 6th legislature
Party	Election seating		Lost	Won	Present seating	
Party	Seats	%	Lost	Won	Seats	%
Democratic Liberal Party	51	37.22%	19	2	35	25.54%
Social Democratic Party	49	35.76%	15	3	40	29.19%
National Liberal Party	28	20.43%	16	4	27	19.70%
Democratic Union of Hungarians in Romania	9	6.57%	2	0	7	5.10%
National Union for the Progress of Romania	—	—	4	12	12	8.75%
Independents	—	—		2	2	1.45%
Vacant seats					14	—
Total	137	100	—		137	100

== Chamber of Deputies ==
On 19 December 2008, Roberta Anastase was elected President of the Chamber of Deputies as a member of Democratic Liberal Party (PDL). She was removed from office on 3 July 2012, and replaced by Valeriu Zgonea, Chamber Vice President at that time.

Seats in the Chamber of Deputies of Romania
Parliamentary Group	Election seating		Lost	Won	Present	
Parliamentary Group	Seats	%	Lost	Won	Seats	%
Democratic Liberal Party	115	34.43%	29	12	106	31.73%
Social Democratic Party	114	34.13%	29	2	91	27.24%
National Liberal Party	65	19.46%	21	6	56	16.76%
Democratic Union of Hungarians in Romania	22	6.58%	2	0	20	5.98%
Ethnic minorities parties	18	5.39%	2	0	16	4.79%
National Union for the Progress of Romania	—	—	16	16	12	3.59%
Independents					8	2.39%
Vacant seats					25	—
Total	334	100	—		334	100

During the 2009 Spring Session of the Parliament, two Inquiry Committees were constituted, along with an Inquiry Sub-Committee. One Committee was formed to examine Minister of Youth and Sport Monica Iacob-Ridzi, regarding her possible misuse of money spent on Youth Day festivities. The other investigated Minister of Environment and Sustainable Development, Nicolae Nemirschi, regarding the possible misuse of money spent by his Ministry on the promotion of Governmental Programs. The Sub-Committee was formed to review former Prime Minister Călin Popescu-Tăriceanu, regarding the possible fraudulent allocation of oil drilling rights in the Snake Island area, recently gained by Romania.

The Chamber of Deputies was called in an Extraordinary Session in July to receive the reports of the Ridzi Inquiry Committee and Tăriceanu Inquiry Sub-Committee, and the formation of a new Inquiry Committee for the Minister of Tourism, Elena Udrea, regarding the possible misuse of money spent by her Ministry on tourism ads.

== By-elections ==
Summary of the Romanian legislative by-election results for the 2008 - 2012 legislature (LIII)
Date	College - Constituency	Candidates	Parties and alliances	Votes	%
17 January 2010	CD 1-42	Radu Stroe	National Liberal Party (Partidul Naţional Liberal)	7,625	70.17%
17 January 2010	CD 1-42	Honorius Prigoană	Democratic Liberal Party (Partidul Democrat-Liberal)	3,242	29.83%
17 January 2010	Total valid votes (40,583 expected voters) (turnout 27.12% - 11,006)			10,867	100.00%
17 January 2010	Source: Biroul Electoral Municipal Archived 4 September 2020 at the Wayback Machine				
25 April 2010	CD 19-42	Teo Trandafir	Democratic Liberal Party (Partidul Democrat-Liberal)		53.59%
25 April 2010	CD 19-42	Liliana Mincă	PSD+PC Electoral Alliance (Alianţa Electorală PSD+PC)		46.41%
25 April 2010	Total valid votes (103,204 expected voters) (turnout 14.84%)			15,093	100.00%
25 April 2010	Source: Autoritatea Electorală Permanentă Archived 13 March 2012 at the Wayback Machine				
28 November 2010	CD 3-22	Mariana Câmpeanu	National Liberal Party (Partidul Naţional Liberal)	8,738	34.86%
28 November 2010	CD 3-22	Daniel Răducanu	Democratic Liberal Party (Partidul Democrat-Liberal)	7,339	29.28%
28 November 2010	CD 3-22	Ţoloaș Liliana	PSD+PC Electoral Alliance (Alianţa Electorală PSD+PC)	5,218	20.81%
28 November 2010	CD 3-22	Nicolae Timiș	Independent	2,683	10.70%
28 November 2010	CD 3-22	Bela Fülöp	Democratic Union of Hungarians in Romania (Uniunea Democrată Maghiară din România)	438	1.75%
28 November 2010	CD 3-22	Remus Cernea	Independent	269	1.07%
28 November 2010	CD 3-22	Mircea Părăian	New Generation Party – Christian Democratic (Partidul Noua Generaţie - Creştin Democrat)	197	0.78%
28 November 2010	CD 3-22	Iosif Danci	Christian-Democratic National Peasants' Party (Partidul Naţional Ţărănesc Creştin Democrat)	187	0.75%
28 November 2010	Total valid votes (53,222 expected voters) (turnout 48.41% - 25,763)			25,069	100.00%
28 November 2010	Source: Autoritatea Electorală Permanentă Archived 4 March 2016 at the Wayback Machine				
21 August 2011	CD 6-29	Adrian Rădulescu	Democratic Liberal Party (Partidul Democrat-Liberal)	17,186	54.95%
21 August 2011	CD 6-29	Liviu Harbuz	Social-Liberal Union (Uniunea Social Liberală)	14,089	45.05%
21 August 2011	Total valid votes (57,996 expected voters) (turnout 53.93% - 32,184)			31,275	100.00%
21 August 2011	Source: Autoritatea Electorala Permanenta Archived 4 March 2016 at the Wayback Machine				
21 August 2011	CD 2-26	Florin Tătaru	Social-Liberal Union (Uniunea Social Liberală)	9,433	42.67%
21 August 2011	CD 2-26	Mariana Pop	Democratic Liberal Party (Partidul Democrat-Liberal)	7,845	35.48%
21 August 2011	CD 2-26	Mircea Dolha	Ecologist Party of Romania (Partidul Ecologist Român)	4,338	19.62%
21 August 2011	CD 2-26	Felician Horzsa	Greater Romania Party (Partidul România Mare)	493	2.23%
21 August 2011	Total valid votes (79,241 expected voters) (turnout 27,90% - 22,478)			22,109	100.00%
21 August 2011	Source: Biroul Electoral Judeţean Archived 31 March 2012 at the Wayback Machine				

== See also ==
- Parliament of Romania
