= 2004–2008 legislature of the Romanian Parliament =

Parliament of Romania LII legislature
←	2000–2004	2008–2012	→

Overview
- Term: 20 December 2004 – December 2008
- Government: National Liberal Party Democratic Party (2004–2007); Democratic Alliance of Hungarians in Romania; Romanian Humanist Party (2004–2005) Conservative Party (2005–2007)
- Opposition: Social Democratic Party Greater Romania Party; Conservative Party (2007–2008) Democratic Liberal Party (2007–2008)

Senate
- Political structure of the Senate
- Members: 135
- President of the Senate: Nicolae Văcăroiu (20 December 2004 – 14 October 2008) Social Democratic Party; Ilie Sârbu (14 October 2008–December 2008) Social Democratic Party
- Social Democratic Party: Ion Iliescu
- National Liberal Party: Puiu Hașotti
- Democratic Liberal Party: Petru Nicolae Ioțcu; Constantin Gheorghe
- Greater Romania Party: Gheorghe Funar; Mihai Ungheanu
- Democratic Alliance of Hungarians in Romania: Attila Verestóy

Chamber of Deputies
- Political structure of the Chamber of Deputies
- Members: 325
- President of the Chamber of Deputies: Adrian Năstase (20 December 2008 – 20 March 2006) Social Democratic Party; Bogdan Olteanu (20 March 2006 – 15 November 2008) National Liberal Party
- Social Democratic Party: Miron Mitrea; Viorel Hrebenciuc
- Democratic Liberal Party: Cozmin Gușă; Cristian Rădulescu
- National Liberal Party: Călin Popescu-Tăriceanu; Eugen Nicolăescu; Crin Antonescu
- Greater Romania Party: Lucian Bolcaș; Ion Mînzînă; Petre Popeangă; Ioan Aurel Rus; Octavian-Mircea Purceld
- Democratic Alliance of Hungarians in Romania: Atilla Kelemen; Árpád Márton

Government
- Tăriceanu II Cabinet (minority): Călin Popescu-Tăriceanu (5 April 2007 – 22 December 2008)
- Tăriceanu I Cabinet (coalition): Călin Popescu-Tăriceanu (29 December 2004 – 5 April 2007)

Sessions
- 1st: December 2004 – December 2004
- 2nd: March 2005 – July 2005
- 3rd: September 2005 – December 2005
- 4th: March 2006 – July 2006
- 5th: September 2006 – December 2006
- 6th: March 2007 – December 2008

In Romania's 2004 general election, held on 28 November, no party won an outright majority. The Social Democratic Party (PSD) won the largest number of seats but was in opposition because the Justice and Truth Alliance (DA), the Democratic Alliance of Hungarians in Romania (UDMR/RMDSZ), the Romanian Humanist Party (PUR; which later became the Conservative Party), and the National Minorities formed a governing coalition. The Conservative Party (PC) withdrew in December 2006, meaning that the government lost the majority. In April 2007, the liberal Prime Minister, Călin Popescu-Tăriceanu, dismissed the Democratic Party (PD) ministers from the government and formed a minority government with the Democratic Alliance of Hungarians in Romania (UDMR/RMDSZ), thereby marking the end of the Justice and Truth Alliance (DA).

== Senate ==
The President of the Senate for this legislature was Nicolae Văcăroiu, who was elected on 20 December 2004. Following his ad interim presidency of Romania, he delegated his attributions to the vicepresident Doru Ioan Tărăcilă. After Văcăroiu was sworn in as president of the Court of Accounts (Romanian: Curtea de Conturi), Ilie Sârbu was elected as the new President of the Senate.

The table below gives the state of play before the 2008 election; parties in bold were part of the governing coalition at the end of this legislature.

Party	% of seats	Seats
Social Democratic Party	31.4	43
**National Liberal Party**	16	22
Democratic Party	15.4	21
Greater Romania Party	13.1	18
Conservative Party	8.0	11
**Democratic Alliance of Hungarians in Romania**	7.3	10
Independents	8.8	12
**Total**	**100**	**137**

== Chamber of Deputies ==
During the 2004–2008 legislature, the president of the Chamber of Deputies was Bogdan Olteanu from the National Liberal Party (PNL), who was elected on 20 March 2006, after the Chamber's former president, Adrian Năstase, was forced by his own party (the Social Democratic Party, PSD) to step down amidst corruption allegations.

After the 2004 elections, several deputies from the Social Democratic Party switched to other parties (including the governing Justice and Truth Alliance, DA) or became independents, with the total number of Social Democratic Party seats being reduced from 113 to 105. The number of Justice and Truth Alliance (DA) deputies also increased from 112 to 118, making it the largest formation in parliament as of October 2006. This changed again in December 2006, leaving the Social Democratic Party with 107 seats and the Justice and Truth Alliance (DA) with 101. Since April 2007 the Justice and Truth Alliance (DA) has split leaving the two former members with 51 respectively 50 members. Deputies elected to the European Parliament in the 2007 election resigned, thus reducing the number of deputies to 314 as of 4 December 2007.

A new election was held in 2008. The table below gives the state of play before the 2008 election; parties in bold were part of the governing coalition at the end of this legislature. That coalition was tacitly supported by the PSD.

Party	% of seats	Seats
Social Democratic Party	32.31	105
Democratic Liberal Party	20.62	67
**National Liberal Party**	18.15	59
Greater Romania Party	6.77	22
**Democratic Alliance of Hungarians in Romania**	6.77	22
Conservative Party	5.85	19
National minorities	5.54	18
Independents	4.00	13
**Total**	**100**	**325**

== See also ==
- Parliament of Romania
