= Green Party (Romania) =

Green Party – The Greens Partidul Verde (Verzii) (Note: Abbreviated PV)
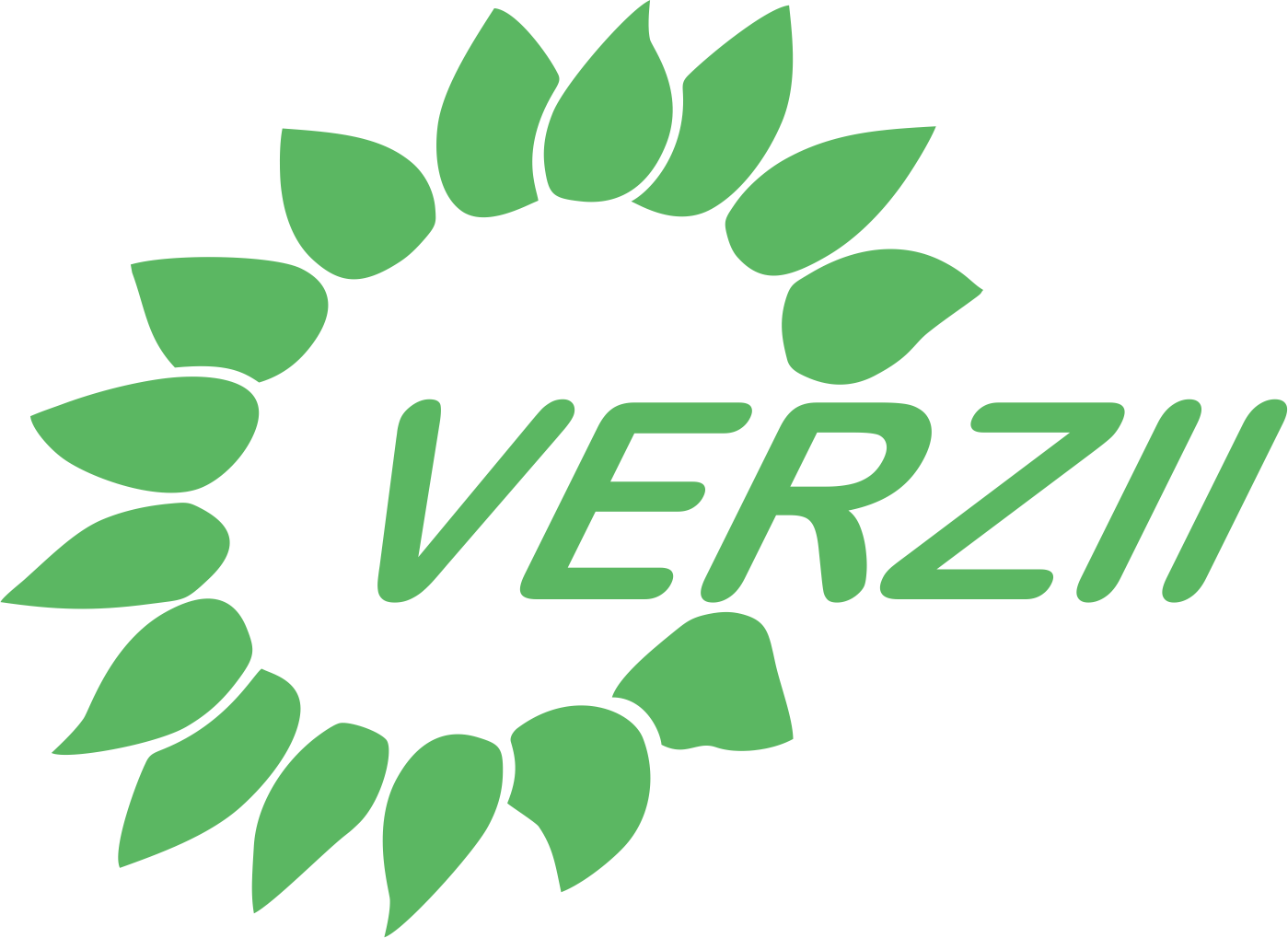
- Founded: November 2005 (originally); September 2022 (Re-establishment as Green Party – Greens)
- Headquarters: Str. Cuțitul de Argint nr. 8, Sector 4, Bucharest
- Think tank: Institutul Verde
- Youth wing: Tinerii Verzi (i.e. Young Greens)
- Membership (2022): c. 4,400
- Ideology: Green politics Progressivism; Pro-Europeanism; Big tent Faction: Green conservatism
- Political position: Centre-left to left-wing Faction: Centre-right
- National affiliation: None (since 2025); PVE (2008); USL (2011–2013); AER (2023–2024); MRR (2024, faction)
- European affiliation: European Green Party
- International affiliation: Global Greens
- Colours: Green
- Slogan: Toți pentru Verde. Verzii pentru Toți!
- Senate: 0 / 135
- Chamber of Deputies: 0 / 330
- European Parliament: 0 / 33
- County Councils: 0 / 1,340
- Mayors: 2 / 3,176
- Local councils: 37 / 39,900

Website
- partidulverde.ro

The Green Party – The Greens (Romanian: Partidul Verde), often shortened to The Greens (Romanian: Verzii) is a Romanian political party that ideologically follows green politics and environmentalism. The Green Party is the only political party in Romania that is a full-rights member of the European Green Party (EGP), and is represented by the Greens–European Free Alliance in the European Parliament.

== Ideology ==
The Green Party has progressive views on abortion and LGBT rights but more conservative views on drug use and religion and from an economic point of view it is centre-left to left-wing, being among the few centre-left political organizations in Romania. Before the 2022 Congress, the party was economically much more centre-right.

=== Social ===
The Green Party supports environmental causes, such as reforestation and reductions in carbon emissions. It supports an extension in individual rights as well as greater separation of church and state, including a gradual removal of all state funding for religious institutions. Like the vast majority of Romanian political parties, it is supportive of European integration.

=== Environment and green economy ===
The Greens consider that the budgetary and private financial flows invested in industries with high carbon dioxide emissions are today greater than the budgetary and private financial flows intended for adaptation to climate change and a green transition.

They support the participation and representation of young people in democratic and decision-making processes at all levels, i.e. by having children involved in the evaluation and formulation of policies through dialogue with experienced people and by organizing debating groups in schools, high schools and universities.

They also support the right to vote from the age of 16 for all types of elections.

=== Youth politics ===
The party advocates for all new legislative acts and public policy projects to be approved only after assessing their impact on young people up to 30 years old. They support the introduction of a mechanism for monitoring legislation from a youth perspective, including both an impact assessment and a mechanism for consultation with youth representatives when legislation has an impact on young people.

A decrease in the number of NEETs in Romania (young people who neither work, study, nor participate in professional training) can also be done by developing a wider professional orientation process, starting from the age of 12. The party wants to enable young people to benefit from visits and short experiential internships at for- and non-profit organizations, in close cooperation with schools, local administrations and respective organizations and enterprises to allow young people to have their first contact with a professional environment.

They also support the introduction of universal basic income for students over a period of 3 years.

=== Work and workers ===
The Greens consider that in Romania and beyond, the "price of work" has become the "cost of work", and that work is not rewarded at its true value. The party believes the country is still one of cheap labor, with an explosive potential that risks destabilizing all social balances. The Greens support increasing the minimum wage and linking it to the minimum consumption basket for decent living, so that decent living will no longer be a dead letter in the Constitution, and purchasing power will not collapse under the pressure of inflationary crises. The party supports the introduction of a minimum wage in the European Union as a mechanism of social justice, at the national and supranational level. They support the strengthening of social dialogue in Romania, the reform of the Labor Code from the perspective of the right to collective negotiations, respect for health and safety at work and the balance between work and private life. The party calls for a new social dialogue law to confirm and guarantee negotiations at the national level, to facilitate the formation of unions, the initiation of strikes, and the negotiation of collective contracts at the sector level. They demand the reduction of the union representativeness threshold from 50%+1 to 30%. They also demand transparent reports on health and safety at work and hours worked by employees, for all companies. The party considers a successful green transition to mean decent, safe, sustainable jobs, and a healthy work-life balance. They ask the Government and the Parliament to urgently ratify the ILO Convention no. 190, of the International Labour Organization for the elimination of violence and harassment in the world of work.

== Youth organisation (Tinerii Verzi) ==
Young Greens of Romania Tinerii Verzi
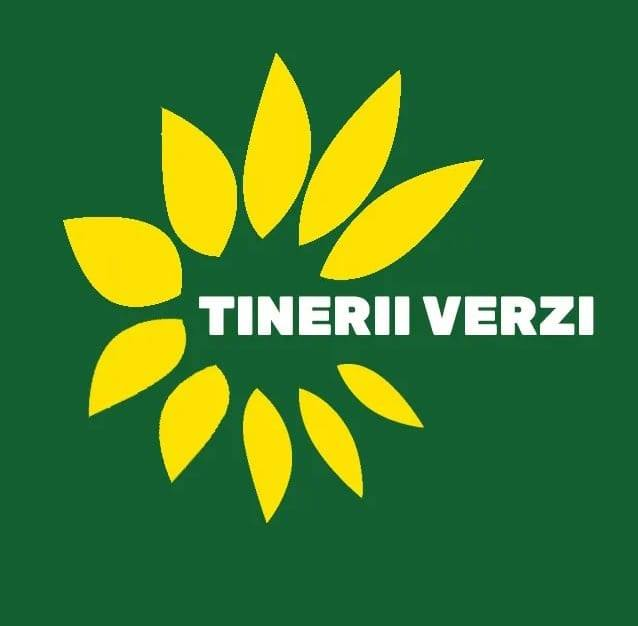
- Leader: Cătălina Barzu
- Founded: 7 March 2022
- Headquarters: Bucharest, Sector 4
- Membership: c. 30
- Ideology: Environmentalism; Youth politics Factions: Progressivism; Green conservatism
- Position: Centre-right to Left-wing
- Mother party: Green Party (Romania)
- Website: https://partidulverdeverzii.ro/despre-noi/tinerii-verzi/

The Young Greens (Romanian: Tinerii Verzi) is the youth organization of the Green Party.

Tineri Verzii are the only youth organization with a left-green orientation in Romania and also the first to emphasize social and environmental justice.

The organization was founded in March 2022. On August 15, 2022, the first General Assembly of Young Greens took place. At the assembly, the statute and the program were validated and the members of the National Bureau were elected.

On May 24, the Young Green Congress elected Bogdan Dumitraș and Miruna Necula as co-presidents. Later, during June, Necula was dismissed from the leadership of the organization.

As of 2023 the co-presidents of the Young Greens are Bogdan Dumitraș (Satu Mare) and Catalina Barzu (Iași), the national coordinator is Daria Radovan (Sibiu), and the general secretary is Angelo Stanca (Satu Mare).

== History ==
The Green Party was founded in November 2005 by Gheorghe Ionicescu, after the merger of the Ecologist Federation of Romania (FER) and AP was revoked. The FER was previously founded in 1990 and is the predecessor of the Green Party. He participated in the presidential election in 2009, supporting the candidacy of Remus Cernea. Also in 2009, Ionicescu died, and Silviu Popa was appointed as chairperson of the Green Party to replace him. Popa was validated at the party congress on 26 September 2009 and resigned in early 2012.

At the local elections held in 2012, the Green Party gained 2 mayors (in Iclănzel, Mureș and Azuga, Prahova) and 124 local councilors, with 0.87% of the votes at national level. In the 2012 parliamentary election, the Green Party had two MPs (Ovidiu Iane and Remus Cernea) on the Social Liberal Union (USL) lists.

On 13 May 2013, in the context of the public debate on the exploration and exploitation of shale gas, the Green Party drifted from the USL's position and remained consistent with its environmental principles, according to the press release: "We oppose to the shale gas, mining operations at Roșia Montană, we are extremely concerned that within the SLU there are more and more opinions and intentions to go ahead, to move towards such projects on shale gas and cyanide. Under these conditions, we cannot continue the collaboration with SLU because we would support such a political direction."

"The Green Party begins a new political path on September 3, 2022. A new team! A new center-left political program! A new approach! At the Dalles Hall in Bucharest, starting at 12:00, the Extraordinary Congress of the Green Party (Greens) will take place. A new statute, a new political program and a new leadership team will be submitted for debate and adoption.

They will apply for the positions of co-presidents: Marius Lazăr – political scientist, and Lavinia Cosma- counselor for vocational guidance, ex-USR parliamentarian, and for that of executive president - Adrian Dohotaru, environmental activist -ex- USR parliamentarian."

On 27 May 2023, an Extraordinary Congress took place in Busteni where Marius Lazăr and Lavinia Cosma were re-elected as co-presidents of the Green Party.

In 2024, due to their endorsement of Mircea Geoană's presidential campaign and their ties to the Romania Reborn Movement, Marius Lazăr and Lavinia Cosma were removed from their leadership positions, being replaced by Rodica Bărbuță and Bogdan Botea, and the party as a whole reaffirmed its opposition to Geoană's candidacy. Marius Lazăr then joined the Romania in Action Party, becoming its candidate for the Chamber of Deputies in Sibiu County.

== Electoral history ==
=== Legislative elections ===
Election	Chamber			Senate			Position	Aftermath
Election	Votes	%	Seats	Votes	%	Seats	Position	Aftermath
2008	18,279	0.27	0 / 334	48,119	0.70	0 / 137	10th (Note: (within the Green Ecologist Party, composed of PV and the PER.)	Extra-parliamentary
2008	18,279	0.27	0 / 334	48,119	0.70	0 / 137	10th	Extra-parliamentary
2008	18,279	0.27	0 / 334	48,119	0.70	0 / 137	10th	Extra-parliamentary
2012	did not compete (Note: For these legislative elections, the Greens competed on the PSD ballot line, within the Social Liberal Union (USL).)		2 / 412	did not compete		0 / 176	–	Extra-parliamentary
2012	did not compete		2 / 412	did not compete		0 / 176	–	Extra-parliamentary
2012	did not compete		2 / 412	did not compete		0 / 176	–	Extra-parliamentary
2012	did not compete		2 / 412	did not compete		0 / 176	–	Extra-parliamentary support to the technocratic Cioloș Cabinet (2015–2017)
2016	566	0.01	0 / 329	719	0.01	0 / 136	15th	Extra-parliamentary
2016	566	0.01	0 / 329	719	0.01	0 / 136	15th	Extra-parliamentary
2016	566	0.01	0 / 329	719	0.01	0 / 136	15th	Extra-parliamentary
2020	20,614	0.35	0 / 330	23,085	0.39	0 / 136	13th	Extra-parliamentary
2020	20,614	0.35	0 / 330	23,085	0.39	0 / 136	13th	Extra-parliamentary
2020	20,614	0.35	0 / 330	23,085	0.39	0 / 136	13th	Extra-parliamentary
2024	248	0.00	0 / 331	290	0.00	0 / 134	19th	Extra-parliamentary
2024	248	0.00	0 / 331	290	0.00	0 / 134	19th	Extra-parliamentary
2024	248	0.00	0 / 331	290	0.00	0 / 134	19th	Extra-parliamentary

==== Notes ====
^{4} FER (Green Party's predecessor) previously merged with AP. The merger was revoked after the elections.

=== Presidential elections ===
Election	Candidate	First round			Second round		
Election	Candidate	Votes	Percentage	Position	Votes	Percentage	Position
2009	Remus Cernea	60,539	0.62%	8th			
2014	did not compete						
2019	did not compete						
2024	did not compete						
2025	Endorsed Nicușor Dan^{1}	1,979,767	20.99%	2nd	6,168,696	53.60%	1st

Note: ^{1}Independent candidate endorsed by the PV.

=== European elections ===
Election	Votes	Percentage	MEPs	Position	EU Party	EP Group
2007	19,820	0.38%	0 / 32	14th	EGP	—
2009	did not compete				EGP	—
2014	did not compete				EGP	—
2019	did not compete				EGP	—
2024	did not compete				EGP	—

=== 2024 local election results ===
2024 mayoral and local council elections
City	Mayor	Municipal council			
City	Mayor	Votes	%	Seats	Aftermath
Baia Mare	0.38 / 100	338	0,73%	0 / 23	No seats
Bacău	11.20 / 100	5,149	8,90%	3 / 23	TBD
Constanța	1.14 / 100	1,237	1,18%	0 / 27	No seats
Iași	26.05 / 100	2,064	1,91%	0 / 27	No seats
Târgu Jiu	11.29 / 100	3,077	9,34%	2 / 21	PSD-PV
City	Mayor	City council			
City	Mayor	Votes	%	Seats	Aftermath
Codlea	3.15 / 100	479	5,41%	1 / 19	TBD
Cisnădie	5.04 / 100	499	5,27%	1 / 15	TBD
Făgăraș	0.00 / 100	352	3,38%	0 / 19	No seats
Frasin	2.27 / 100	72	2,72%	0 / 15	No seats
Ghimbav	11.97 / 100	465	13,53%	2 / 15	TBD
Jimbolia	9.47 / 100	252	6,40%	1 / 17	TBD
Moldova Nouă	4.42 / 100	293	6,31%	1 / 17	TBD
Pașcani	0.00 / 100	264	1,88%	0 / 19	No seats
Commune	Mayor	Local council			
Commune	Mayor	Votes	%	Seats	Aftermath
Afumați	20.51 / 100	975	21,60%	2 / 15	Opposition
Bârnova	3.44 / 100	242	6,24%	1 / 15	TBD
Călinești-Oaș	60.58 / 100	189	8,58%	1 / 15	Coalition
Certeze	0.00 / 100	147	8,17%	2 / 15	TBD
Dobroești	7.91 / 100	397	7,45%	2 / 17	TBD
Florești	6.54 / 100	987	5,77%	1 / 19	TBD
Moisei	0.00 / 100	213	5,06%	1 / 15	TBD
Sânger	51.47 / 100	153	12,93%	2 / 11	Coalition
Todirești	15.06 / 100	436	17,26%	3 / 15	Opposition

=== 2020 local election results ===
==== 2020 county council election ====
Election	County	Votes	%	Councillors
2020	Alba	1,482	1.01%	0 / 32
2020	Bacău	3,431	1.50%	0 / 36
2020	Bistrița-Năsăud	1,831	1.47%	0 / 30
2020	Botoșani	611	0.40%	0 / 32
2020	Brăila	1,025	0.93%	0 / 30
2020	Brașov	2,859	1.41%	0 / 34
2020	Bucharest	11,828	1.81%	0 / 55
2020	Caraș-Severin	2,960	2.49%	0 / 30
2020	Cluj	4,421	1.75%	0 / 36
2020	Dolj	2,359	0.91%	0 / 36
2020	Gorj	3,463	2.31%	0 / 32
2020	Iași	8,114	3.01%	0 / 36
2020	Ilfov	7,723	4.21%	0 / 32
2020	Maramureș	2,911	1.58%	0 / 34
2020	Mehedinți	1,094	0.91%	0 / 30
2020	Mureș	2,607	1.19%	0 / 34
2020	Sibiu	2,304	1.50%	0 / 32
2020	Suceava	2,437	0.96%	0 / 36
2020	Timiș	4,183	1.63%	0 / 36
2020	Tulcea	857	0.99%	0 / 30

==== 2020 mayoral and local council election ====
City	Mayor	Local council			
City	Mayor	Votes	%	Seats	Aftermath
Bucharest	2.08 / 100	11,828	1.81%	0 / 55	Opposition
Constanța	no candidate	1,737	1.82%	0 / 27	Opposition
Baia Mare	1.61 / 100	809	1.98%	0 / 23	Opposition
Bistrița	4.84 / 100	1,512	5.35%	1 / 21	PNL-USR-PV
Târgu Jiu	6.83 / 100	1,727	6.48%	2 / 21	Opposition

=== Local election summary ===
Election	Local council		
Election	Votes	%	Councillors
2016	12,757	0.15%	52 / 39,000
2020	52,545	0.66%	117 / 39,000
2024	22.111	0.25%	38 / 39,000

== Logos ==
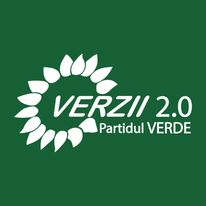
Logo after 2022

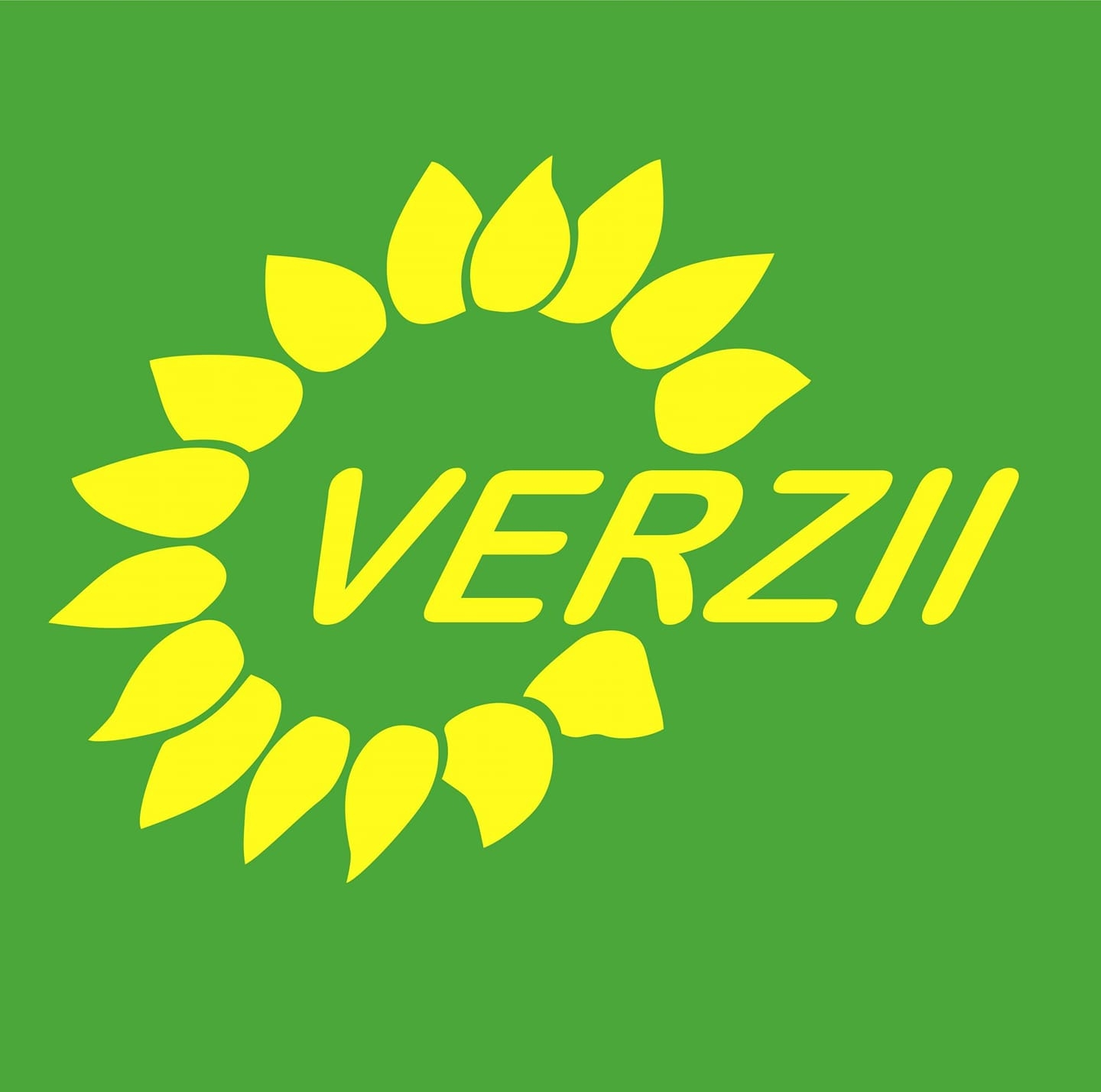
Logo between 2019 and 2022

== See also ==
- Health Education Nature Sustainability Party
- Romanian Ecologist Party
- European Greens
- Green party
- Green politics
- List of environmental organizations
