= List of international premieral trips made by Li Keqiang =

This is a list of international trips made by Li Keqiang during his tenure as the premier of China. Li Keqiang visited 50 countries across 6 continents during his tenure from March 2013 to March 2023.

== Summary ==
The number of visits per country where he has travelled are:

- One visit to: Angola, Australia, Brazil, Brunei, Bulgaria, Canada, Chile, Colombia, Croatia, Cuba, Ethiopian, France, Greece, Hungary, Indonesia, India, Ireland, Italy, Japan, Kenya, Kyrgyzstan, Laos, Latvia, Malaysia, Mongolia, Myanmar, Netherlands, New Zealand, Nigeria, Pakistan, Peru, the Philippines, Portugal, Romania, Serbia, Singapore, South Korea, Spain, Tajikistan, the United Kingdom, the United States, Vietnam
- Two visits to: Cambodia, Kazakhstan, Switzerland, Uzbekistan
- Three visits to: Thailand
- Four visits to: Belgium, Germany, Russia

World map highlighting countries visited by Li Keqiang during his premiership. One visit Two visits Three visits Four visits China

== 2013 ==
Dates	Country	Locations	Details
19–22 May	India	New Delhi Mumbai	Official visit. Li held talks with Prime Minister Manmohan Singh in New Delhi, met with Indian National Congress President Sonia Gandhi, Indian president Pranab Mukherjee, and Indian vice president Mohammad Hamid Ansari, and visited Tata Motors in Mumbai.
22–23 May	Pakistan	Islamabad	Official visit. Li held talks with President Asif Ali Zardari and caretaker prime minister Mir Hazar Khan Khoso, met with Pakistan Muslim League (N) leader Nawaz Sharif, Senate Chairman Nayyar Hussain Bukhari, and National Assembly Speaker Fahmida Mirza. Li also delivered a speech to the Pakistani Parliament.
23–25 May	Switzerland	Zurich Bern	Official visit. Li met with the president of the Swiss Confederation Ueli Maurer.
25–27 May	Germany	Berlin	Official visit. Li met with German president Joachim Gauck, held talks with German chancellor Angela Merkel, met with Social Democratic Party Leader Sigmar Gabriel, chancellor candidate Frank-Walter Steinmeier, and former chancellor Helmut Schmidt, visited the site of the Potsdam Conference, and met with leaders of German political parties and local leaders.
9–11 October	Brunei	Bandar Seri Begawan	Official visit. Li attended the 16th China-ASEAN (10+1) Leaders' Meeting, the 16th ASEAN-China, Japan and South Korea (10+3) Leaders' Meeting and the 8th East Asia Summit. He held talks with Brunei Sultan Hassanal Bolkiah, met with members of the royal family, and met with Myanmar President Thein Sein, Australian prime minister Tony Abbott, US secretary of state John Kerry, South Korean president Park Geun-hye, Indonesian president Susilo Bambang Yudhoyono, Cambodian prime minister Hun Sen and New Zealand prime minister John Key.
11–13 October	Thailand	Bangkok Chiang Mai	Official visit. Li held talks with Thai Prime Minister Yingluck Shinawatra, met with Thai Princess Sirindhorn, Thai National Assembly President and Speaker of the House of Representatives Somsak Kiatsuranont, Vice President of the National Assembly and Speaker of the Senate Nikom Wairatpanij, Opposition Leader Abhisit Vejjajiva, as well as Deputy Speakers of the Senate and House of Representatives and chairmen of various special committees. He also visited Chiang Mai.
13–15 October	Vietnam	Hanoi	Official visit. Li held talks with Prime Minister Nguyễn Tấn Dũng, and also met with Communist Party of Vietnam General Secretary, Nguyễn Phú Trọng, President Trần Đại Quang, and National Assembly Chairman Nguyễn Sinh Hùng.
25–28 November	Romania	Bucharest	Official visit. Li attended the China-CEEC Summit. He held talks with Romanian prime minister Victor Ponta, met with Romanian president Traian Băsescu, Romanian Senate President Crin Antonescu and Chamber of Deputies President Valeriu Zgonea. He also delivered a speech at the Romanian Parliament, met with Bosnian prime minister Vjekoslav Bevanda, Croatian prime minister Zoran Milanović, Lithuanian prime minister Algirdas Butkevičius, Estonian prime minister Andrus Ansip, Hungarian prime minister Viktor Orbán, Serbian prime minister Ivica Dačić, Bulgarian prime minister Plamen Oresharski, Slovak prime minister Robert Fico, Czech prime minister Jiří Rusnok, Polish prime minister Donald Tusk, Montenegrin prime minister Milo Đukanović, Macedonian prime minister Nikola Gruevski, Slovenian prime minister Alenka Bratušek, Albanian prime minister Edi Rama, and attended the Third China-CEEC Economic and Trade Forum. This was the first visit of a Chinese premier to Romania in 19 years.
28–29 November	Uzbekistan	Tashkent	Li attended the 12th Meeting of Prime Ministers of Shanghai Cooperation Organization Member States. Met with Uzbek president Islam Karimov, held talks with Uzbek prime minister Shavkat Mirziyoyev, and met with Russian prime minister Dmitry Medvedev, Kyrgyz prime minister Zhantoro Satybaldiyev, Kazakh prime minister Serik Akhmetov and Tajik prime minister Kokhir Rasulzoda.

== 2014 ==
Dates	Country	Locations	Details
4–6 May	Ethiopia	Addis Ababa	Official visit. Li held talks with Prime Minister Hailemariam Desalegn and met with President Mulatu Teshome. Li also visited the African Union headquarters and met with AU Commission Chairperson Nkosazana Dlamini-Zuma.
6–8 May	Nigeria	Abuja	Official visit. Li held talks with President Goodluck Jonathan. He also met with Klaus Schwab, the chairman of the World Economic Forum, and attended the plenary session of the World Economic Forum Africa Summit.
8–9 May	Angola	Luanda	Official visit. Li held talks with President José Eduardo dos Santos.
9–11 May	Kenya	Nairobi	Official visit. Li held talks with President Uhuru Kenyatta, met with United Nations Environment Programme Administrator Achim Steiner and UN-HABITAT Executive Director Joan Clos, visited the Nairobi National Park with President Kenyatta and his wife, and met with staff of the Chinese Embassy in Kenya, representatives of Chinese-funded institutions and overseas Chinese. He also visited the Great Rift Valley, inspected the African branch of China Central Television and was interviewed.
16–19 June	United Kingdom	London	Official visit. Li met with Queen Elizabeth II, held the annual China-UK prime ministerial meeting with Prime Minister David Cameron, attended the China-UK Global Economic Roundtable, met with opposition leader Ed Miliband, and House of Lords Lord Speaker Frances D'Souza. He also met with staff of the Chinese Embassy in the UK, Chinese-funded institutions, overseas Chinese and international students and delivered a speech.
19–21 June	Greece	Athens Crete	Official visit. Li held talks with Prime Minister Antonis Samaras, met with Speaker Vangelis Meimarakis, laid a wreath at the Tomb of the Unknown Soldier, visited the Acropolis, met with President Karolos Papoulias, and visited COSCO Piraeus Port. He also met with the Crete Governor Stavros Arnaoutakis, and visited the ruins of the Palace of Knossos and the Heraklion Archaeological Museum with Prime Minister Samaras and his wife.
9–12 October	Germany	Berlin Hamburg	Official visit. Li co-chaired the China-Germany government consultation with Chancellor Angela Merkel, met with President Joachim Gauck, and attended the 7th China-Germany Economic and Technical Forum with Chancellor Merkel. He also met with Hamburg Mayor Olaf Scholz, Luxembourg Prime Minister Xavier Bettel, attended the closing luncheon of the 6th China-Europe Forum Hamburg Summit. and met with European Parliament President Martin Schulz.
12–14 October	Russia	Moscow	Official visit. Li laid a wreath at the Tomb of the Unknown Soldier, held talks with Prime Minister Dmitry Medvedev, and attended the opening ceremony of the International Forum on "Open Innovation" together with Prime Minister Medvedev and delivered a speech. He also met with State Duma Chairman Sergey Naryshkin and Federation Council Chairwoman Valentina Matviyenko.
14–17 October	Italy	Rome Milan	Official visit. Li held talks with Prime Minister Matteo Renzi, met with President Giorgio Napolitano, Senate President Pietro Grasso, Chamber of Deputies President Laura Boldrini, and EU leaders. He visited the Food and Agriculture Organization headquarters in Rome, met with FAO Director-General José Graziano da Silva, and delivered a speech at the FAO. Li also attended the 10th Asia-Europe Summit in Milan.
12–14 November	Myanmar	Naypyidaw	Official visit. Li attended the East Asia Cooperation Leaders' Meeting. He also held talks with President Thein Sein, and met with Assembly of the Union Speaker and House of Representatives Speaker Shwe Mann.
14–15 December	Kazakhstan	Astana	Official visit. Li held the second regular meeting between the prime ministers of China and Kazakhstan with Prime Minister Karim Massimov, and met with President Nursultan Nazarbayev. He also attended the 13th meeting of the Council of Heads of Government of the Shanghai Cooperation Organization held in Astana and met with Russian prime minister Dmitry Medvedev.
15–19 December	Serbia	Belgrade	Official visit. Li attended the third China-Central and Eastern European Countries Leaders' Meeting. He also held talks with Prime Minister Aleksandar Vučić, and met with President Tomislav Nikolić.
19–20 December	Thailand	Bangkok	Li attended the fifth leaders’ meeting of Greater Mekong Subregion Economic Cooperation.

== 2015 ==
Dates	Country	Locations	Details
20–23 January	Switzerland	Zurich	Working visit.
18 May	Ireland	County Clare	Transit visit.
19–21 May	Brazil	Brasília Rio de Janeiro	Official visit.
21–22 May	Colombia	Bogotá	Official visit.
23–24 May	Peru	Lima	Official visit.
25–27 May	Chile	Santiago	Official visit.
28 May	Spain	Mallorca	Transit visit.
29–30 June	Belgium	Brussels	
30 June–3 July	France	Paris	Official visit.
31 October–2 November	South Korea	Seoul	Official visit.
20–24 November	Malaysia	Kuala Lumpur	Official visit.

== 2016 ==
Dates	Country	Locations	Details
13–16 July	Mongolia	Ulaanbaatar	Official visit. Attended the 11th Asia-Europe Meeting.
6–9 September	Laos	Vientiane	Official visit. Attended the East Asia Summit Leaders' Meetings.
18–22 September	United States	New York City	Official visit. Attended the seventy-first session of the United Nations General Assembly.
22–25 September	Canada	Ottawa Montreal	Official visit.
25–28 September	Cuba	Havana	Official visit.
28 September	Portugal	Terceira Island	Technical stop.
3 November	Kyrgyzstan	Bishkek	Official visit. Attended the 15th Meeting of the Shanghai Cooperation Organization (SCO) Council of Heads of Governments (Prime Ministers).
3–4 November	Kazakhstan	Astana	Official visit.
4–5 November	Latvia	Riga	Official visit.
6–9 November	Russia	Saint Petersburg	Official visit.

== 2017 ==
Dates	Country	Locations	Details
23–25 March	Australia	Canberra Sydney	Official visit.
26–29 March	New Zealand	Wellington Auckland	Official visit.
31 May–2 June	Germany	Berlin	Official visit.
2–3 June	Belgium	Brussels	Official visit.
12–16 November	Philippines	Manila	Official visit.
26–30 November	Hungary	Budapest	Official visit.
30 November–2 December	Russia	Moscow Sochi	Official visit.

== 2018 ==
Dates	Country	Locations	Details
10–11 January	Cambodia	Phnom Penh	Official visit. Li attended the second Lancang-Mekong Cooperation Leaders' Meeting, met with Cambodian King Norodom Sihamoni, held talks with Cambodian prime minister Hun Sen, and met with Vietnamese prime minister Nguyễn Xuân Phúc, Thai Prime Minister Prayut Chan-o-cha, and Laotian prime minister Thongloun Sisoulith.
6–8 May	Indonesia	Jakarta	Official visit.
8–11 May	Japan	Tokyo Hokkaido	Official visit. Li attended the seventh China–Japan–South Korea trilateral summit and the 40th anniversary of the Treaty of Peace and Friendship between Japan and China. Li also met with Emperor Akihito and also met with Japanese representatives and relatives of Japanese participating in the signing process of the Peace and Friendship Treaty at the hotel where he stayed in Tokyo.
5–9 July	Bulgaria	Sofia	Official visit. Li attended the seventh China-Central and Eastern European Leaders' Meeting.
9–10 July	Germany	Berlin	Official visit. Li chaired the fifth round of Sino-German government consultations.
11–14 October	Tajikistan	Dushanbe	Official visit. Li attended the 17th meeting of the Council of Heads of Government of the Shanghai Cooperation Organization member states held in Dushanbe.
14–17 October	Netherlands	Amsterdam	Official visit.
17–20 October	Belgium	Brussels	Working visit. Li attended the 12th Asia-Europe Summit held in Brussels.
12–16 November	Singapore		Official visit. Li attended the 21st China-ASEAN Leaders' Meeting, the 21st ASEAN and China, Japan and South Korea Leaders' Meeting and the 13th East Asia Summit.

== 2019 ==
Dates	Country	Locations	Details
8–9 April	Belgium	Brussels	Li attended the 21st China-EU Summit. He met with Belgian prime minister Charles Michel, and co-chaired the China-EU leaders' meeting with European Council President Donald Tusk and European Commission President Jean-Claude Juncker.
9–12 April	Croatia	Zagreb Dubrovnik	Official visit. He held talks with Croatian prime minister Andrej Plenković, and met with Croatian Parliament Speaker Gordan Jandroković and Croatian president Kolinda Grabar-Kitarović. This was the first visit by a Chinese premier to Croatia after Croatia gained independence and established diplomatic relations with the People's Republic of China. He also attended the 8th China-CEEC Summit and met with the Prime Ministers of Bulgaria, Serbia, Slovenia, the Czech Republic, Albania, Slovakia, Poland, Lithuania, Estonia, Hungary, North Macedonia, Montenegro, the Chairman of the Council of Ministers of Bosnia and Herzegovina and the Prime Minister of Romania. During the meeting, Greece joined the "16+1 Cooperation" as a formal member.
16–18 September	Russia	Saint Petersburg Moscow	Official visit. Li held the 24th Regular Meeting of the Chinese and Russian Prime Ministers. He also co-chaired the 24th Regular Meeting of the Chinese and Russian Prime Ministers with Russian prime minister Dmitry Medvedev. Met with Russian president Vladimir Putin.
1–2 November	Uzbekistan	Tashkent	Official visit. Li attended the 18th meeting of the Council of Heads of Government (prime ministers) of the Shanghai Cooperation Organization member states. He met with Uzbek president Shavkat Mirziyoyev and held talks with Uzbek prime minister Abdulla Aripov. He also met with Russian prime minister Dmitry Medvedev and Kazakh prime minister Asqar Mamin.
2–5 November	Thailand	Bangkok	Official visit. He attended the 22nd China-ASEAN (10+1) Leaders' Meeting, the 22nd ASEAN-China, Japan and South Korea (10+3) Leaders' Meeting and the 14th East Asia Summit (EAS). He held talks with Thai Prime Minister Prayut Chan-o-cha and met with Thai Parliament President and House of Representatives Speaker Chuan Leekpai. He met with Vietnamese prime minister Nguyễn Xuân Phúc, Lao prime minister Thongloun Sisoulith, Cambodian prime minister Hun Sen, Japanese prime minister Shinzo Abe, New Zealand prime minister Jacinda Ardern, UN Secretary-General António Guterres, and US national security advisor Robert C. O'Brien. Li also held the seventh round of the China-Australia Prime Ministers' Annual Meeting with Australian prime minister Scott Morrison and attended the third Regional Comprehensive Economic Partnership (RCEP) Leaders' Meeting and announced that the 15 member countries had concluded negotiations as a whole. This visit was Premier Li Keqiang's first visit to Thailand in five years since December 2014 and his first official visit to Thailand in six years since October 2013.

== 2022 ==
Dates	Country	Locations	Details
8–13 November	Cambodia	Phnom Penh	Li paid an official visit to Cambodia and attended the 25th China-ASEAN (10+1) Leaders' Meeting, the 25th ASEAN-China, Japan and South Korea (10+3) Leaders' Meeting and the 17th East Asia Summit (EAS). He held talks with Cambodian prime minister Hun Sen and met with Cambodian king Norodom Sihamoni. He also met with Vietnamese prime minister Phạm Minh Chính, Singaporean prime minister Lee Hsien Loong, Lao prime minister Phankham Viphavanh, UN Secretary-General António Guterres, and IMF managing director Kristalina Georgieva. He also met with Japanese prime minister Fumio Kishida, South Korean president Yoon Suk Yeol, Philippine president Bongbong Marcos, and Australian prime minister Anthony Albanese. He attended the opening ceremony of the Phnom Penh-Sihanoukville Expressway and the supporting livelihood projects and the physical handover ceremony of the China-aided Ta Keo Temple restoration project in Angkor. This visit was Premier Li Keqiang's first visit to Cambodia in four years since January 2018. It was also the first visit overseas by the premier of China since the outbreak of the COVID-19 pandemic, and it is also Li Keqiang's last visit abroad.
