= Petre Popeangă =

Romanian politician

Petre Popeangă (born 19 May 1944, in Lelești) is a Romanian politician and economist who served as a member of the Chamber of Deputies in Romania from 2004 to 2008 and as a delegate Member of the European Parliament in 2007, representing the Greater Romania Party.

He became a delegate MEP on 1 January 2007 with the accession of Romania to the European Union. Until November 14, 2007 he was a member of the Identity, Tradition, Sovereignty group.

== Early life and education ==
Popeangă was born on 19 May 1944 in the commune of Lelești, Gorj County. He graduated from the Academy of Economic Studies in Bucharest and later earned a doctorate in economics, specializing in accounting.

== Political career ==
=== Chamber of Deputies ===
Popeangă was elected to the Chamber of Deputies in the November 2004 legislative election as a member of the Greater Romania Party, taking his seat for the 2004 to 2008 legislature. His mandate, along with those of the deputies elected on 28 November 2004, was validated by the Chamber on 17 December 2004. During his term he served as chairman of the committee for education and was elected its president on 5 February 2008, a position he held for the remainder of the legislature. He also sat on the committee for Budget, Finance, and Banks until February 2008 and the Parliament of Romania committee for European Integration until December 2006. Popeangă served as a parliamentary observer to the European Parliament until December 2006 where he was a part of the non-attached group and had a seat on the committee on budgets.

=== Member of the European Parliament ===
When Romania joined the European Union on 1 January 2007, Popeangă became a delegate Member of the European Parliament, sitting for the sixth parliamentary term. He initially joined the Identity, Tradition, Sovereignty group, a political group formed by parties from across the European far right. He remained in that group until 14 November 2007, when it dissolved after losing the minimum number of member states required to sustain it. His parliamentary term ran alongside the end of his national mandate, and he left the Chamber of Deputies too when the 2004 to 2008 legislature concluded.

== Academic career ==
Alongside his political career, Popeangă built a long academic career as a professor at Nicolae Titulescu University in Bucharest, where he has taught in the field of accounting and economics. He has continued in this role in the years since leaving Parliament, holding regular consultation hours for students and taking part in doctoral committees, including the public defence of a doctoral thesis in December 2023
