= Florin Tătaru =

Romanian politician

Member of the Chamber of Deputies
- Incumbent
- Assumed office 5 September 2011
- Preceded by: Cătălin Cherecheș

Personal details
- Born: Florin-Cristian Tătaru; December 5, 1967 (age 58) Baia Mare, Maramureș County
- Party: PSD (1997–present)
- Education: Bucharest Academy of Economic Studies

Florin-Cristian Tătaru (born December 5, 1967) is a Romanian politician. A member of the Social Democratic Party (PSD), he has represented Maramureș County in the Chamber of Deputies since 2011.

== Biography ==
Born in Baia Mare, he attended an arts school in his native city from 1976 to 1982. From that year until 1986, he studied at Gheorghe Șincai High School, specializing in mathematics and physics. He subsequently enrolled in the international economic relations faculty of the Bucharest Academy of Economic Studies, graduating in 1990. Between 1992 and 2001, he successively worked at two private firms in Baia Mare. From 2001 to 2005, he was president of the Maramureș County health insurance fund. From 2006 to 2009, he was a manager at the local Banca Comercială Carpatica. Between 2009 and 2011, he was economic director for the county's forestry service.

Tătaru joined the PSD in 1997. He was vice president of its Maramureș County youth organization from 1998 to 2000, and belonged to the party's national council from 2000 to 2008. From 2000 to 2004, he was vice president of the Baia Mare PSD chapter, and became first vice president in 2011, rising to president in 2016. He has also been vice president of the Maramureș County chapter since 2001. In 2008, he was elected to the Maramureș County Council, serving until 2011.

In August 2011, he contested a by-election for the Chamber of Deputies to replace Cătălin Cherecheș, who had vacated a seat when he was elected mayor of Baia Mare. The election acquired national importance, because together with a similar vote in Neamț County, it marked the first electoral test of the Social Liberal Union (USL). Cherecheș objected to his candidacy, fearing he would be unable to win over half the vote. Tătaru's campaign director was a former Baia Mare mayor, Cristian Anghel. Facing opponents from the governing Democratic-Liberal Party (PDL), the Ecologist Party of Romania and the Greater Romania Party, Tătaru won the race with 42.7% of the vote, outpacing his PDL rival by six points. In response, President Traian Băsescu, a PDL supporter, noted the narrowness of the victory, suggesting that "the USL is and will be an electoral failure". Tătaru took his seat in early September, when the new parliamentary session began. He was assigned to two committees, industry and information technology. In 2012, he secured a full term in parliament, winning 59.4% of the vote, and took a seat on the industry committee. Selected as his party's candidate for the June 2016 local election, Tătaru finished in third place, with 7.3% of the vote.

He married Oana Năcuță, a prosecutor, in 2008. The couple have two children.
