= Association of Macedonians of Romania =

Association of Macedonians of Romania Asociația Macedonenilor din România Друштвото на Македонците од Романија
- Founded: 2000
- Headquarters: Str. Thomas Masaryk nr. 29, Bucharest
- Ideology: Macedonian minority politics
- National affiliation: National Minorities Parliamentary Group
- Chamber of Deputies: 1 / 329
- Senate: 0 / 136
- European Parliament: 0 / 32

Website
- asociatia-macedonenilor.ro

The Association of Macedonians of Romania (Romanian: Asociația Macedonenilor din România, AMR; Macedonian: Друштвото на Македонците од Романија, romanized: Društvoto na Makedoncite od Romanija, DMR) is an ethnic minority political party in Romania representing the Macedonian community.

== History ==
The party was created in 2000. In the general elections that year the party received only 8,809 votes (0.08%), winning a seat in the Chamber of Deputies under the electoral law allowing political parties representing ethnic minority groups to be exempt from the electoral threshold as long as they received 10% of the vote required for a single seat in the Chamber of Deputies. The party has won a seat in every election since.

== Electoral history ==
Election	Chamber of Deputies				Senate		
Election	Votes	%	Seats	Elected MPs	Votes	%	Seats
2000	8,809	0.08	1	Vasile Ioan Savu	–	–	–
2004	9,750	0.10	1	Liana Dumitrescu			
2008	11,814	0.17	1	Liana Dumitrescu	–	–	–
2012	12,212	0.16	1	Ionel Stancu	–	–	–
