= Lavinia Cosma =

Romanian politician

Lavinia Cosma Co-president of Green Party (PV)
- Incumbent
- Assumed office 2022

Personal details
- Born: 30 October 1981 (age 44) Mureș County, Socialist Republic of Romania
- Party: Romania in Action (since 2024)
- Other party: Green Party (2020 - 2024) AER for Romania (2023 - 2024) Save Romania Union (2016–2019)
- Occupation: Politician

Lavinia-Corina Cosma (born 30 October 1981) is a romanian politician, member of Romania in Action Party, former Co-president of the Green Party - Greens (PV), and former Romanian deputy, elected in 2016.

== Politics ==
In 2020, she ran for mayor in Târgu Mureș, which she lost.

The former Mureș deputy Lavinia Cosma was elected on Saturday, September 3, as co-president of the Green Party (PV), on the occasion of the Extraordinary Congress that took place in Bucharest.

According to the Press Office of the Green Party (PV), during the Extraordinary Congress, the motion "Just Romania. A Healthy Country!" won, which is based "on the construction of a healthy Romania.
