= AER for Romania =

Romanian electoral alliance

AER for Romania Alliance Alianța AER pentru România
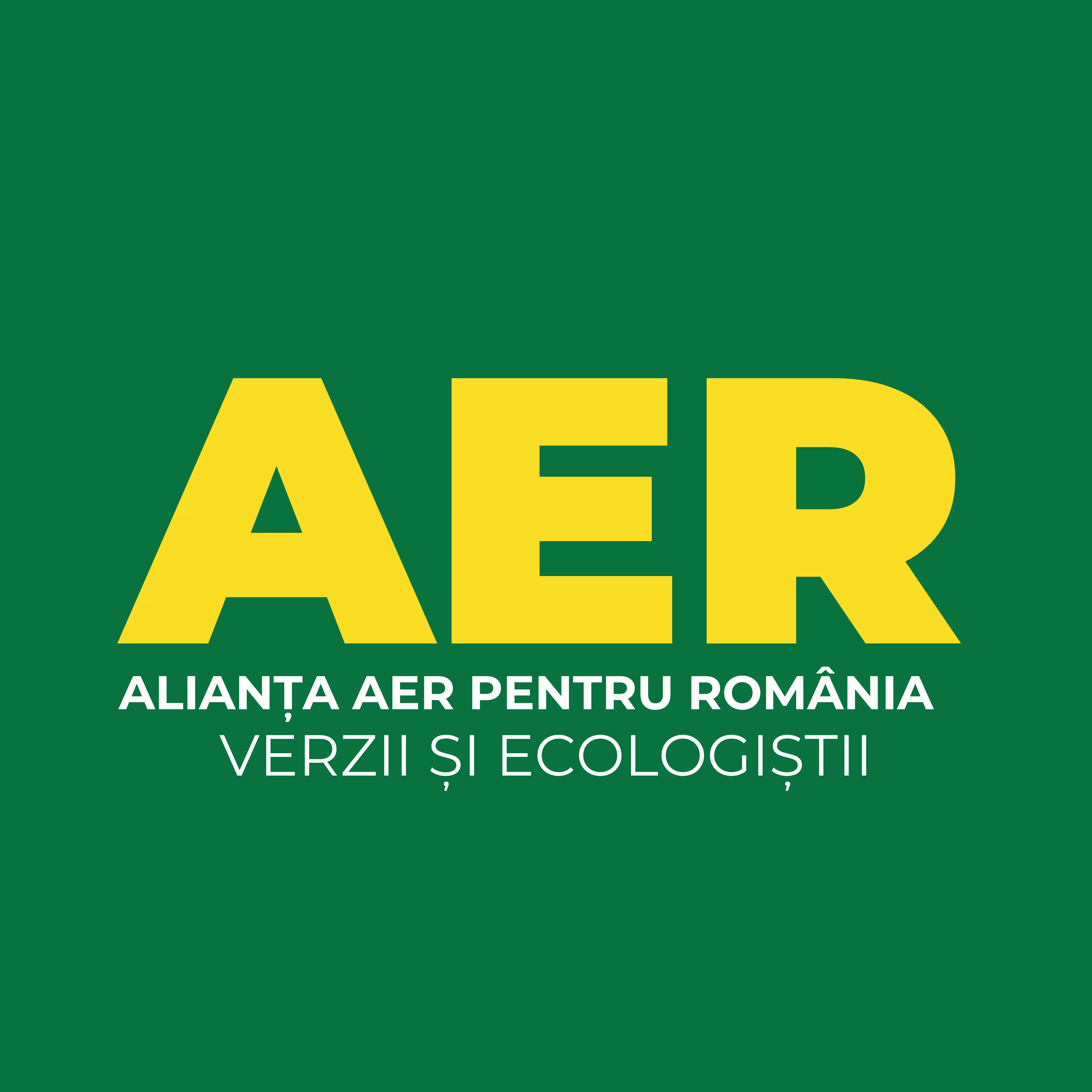
- Leaders: Marius Lazăr (Verzii); Lavinia Cosma (Verzii); Florin Secară (Ecologiștii)
- Founded: 9 December 2023
- Preceded by: Green Party (Romania); Ecologist Party of Romania
- Headquarters: Bucharest, Romania
- Youth wing: AER pentru Tineri
- Membership: cca. 10.000
- Ideology: Green conservatism
- Political position: Fiscal: Centre-left; Cultural: Centre-right
- European affiliation: European Green Party (only Partidul Verde)
- Colours: Green
- Slogan: Aer pentru România! (Air for Romania!)
- Constituent parties: Verzii; Ecologiștii
- Senate: 0 / 136
- Chamber of Deputies: 0 / 330
- European Parliament: 0 / 33
- Big Cities: 1 / 41
- Mayors: 9 / 3,176
- Local councils: 489 / 39,900

Website
- www.aerpentruromania.ro

AER for Romania was an ecological Romanian electoral alliance active between December 2023 and February 2024. Established on 9 December 2023, exclusively as an electoral alliance between the Green Party – The Greens (PV VERZII) and the Ecologist Party of Romania (PER), the alliance was formed to participate together in the June 2024 European Parliament elections in Romania.

== History ==
Marius Lazar, Lavinia Cosma and Florin Secară, as leaders of the alliance, declared on 9 December that the two parties reached an agreement to give confidence to the green, environmentalist electorate to invest a useful vote in the 2024 elections.

== Ideology ==
Alianta AER is an ecological alliance, which is addressed to all nature lovers, to entrepreneurs with a green vision, to all those who believe in the need for clean air, clean water and clean products.

The Alliance is considered to be left-of-center economically and fiscally, supporting higher budgets allocated to education, health and environmental protection. Also, the alliance supports the increase of the minimum wage and demands the elimination of all special pensions.

From a cultural point of view, the alliance is considered a moderate one supporting investments in the Romanian countryside, the promotion and preservation of the Romanian cultural identity and the PER opposes same-sex marriage.

== Parties ==
Party	Abbr.	Ideology	Leader(s)
Romanian Ecologist Party	PER	Green conservatism	Florin Secară
Green Party – The Greens	PV	Green politics	Marius Lazăr; Lavinia Cosma
