= Lelești =

- Commune
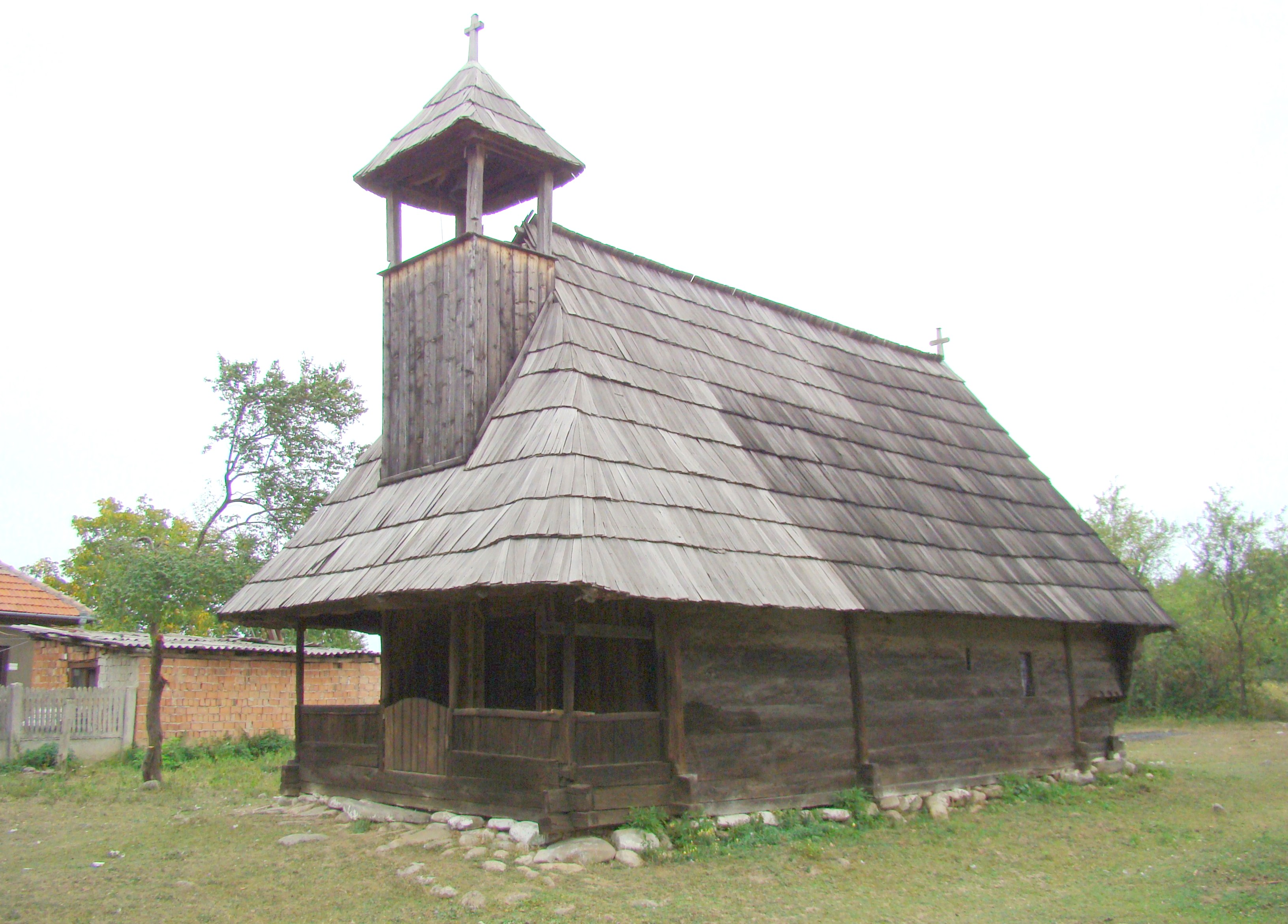
- Saint Nicholas wooden church in Lelești

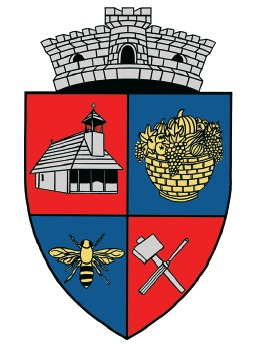
- Coat of arms

- Location in Romania
- Coordinates: 45°06′N 23°12′E
- Country: Romania
- County: Gorj
- Subdivisions: Frătești, Lelești, Rasovița
- Area: 30.18 km^{2} (11.65 sq mi)
- Population (2021-12-01): 1,779
  - Density: 58.95/km^{2} (152.7/sq mi)
- Time zone: UTC+02:00 (EET)
  - Summer (DST): UTC+03:00 (EEST)
- Vehicle reg.: GJ

Lelești is a commune in Gorj County, Oltenia, Romania. It is composed of three villages: Frătești, Lelești and Rasovița.

== Natives ==
- Petre Popeangă
