= Green Ecologist Party =

Romanian electoral alliance

The Green Ecologist Party (Romanian: Partidul Verde Ecologist) was the name of an electoral alliance set up for the 2008 Romanian legislative election. The alliance consisted of two green parties: the Green Party (Romanian: Partidul Verde) and the Ecologist Party of Romania (Romanian: Partidul Ecologist Român). It did not win any seats in Parliament, gaining only 0.27% of the vote for the Chamber of Deputies and 0.70% respectively for the Senate.

== Electoral history ==
=== Legislative elections ===
Election	Chamber			Senate			Position	Aftermath
Election	Votes	%	Seats	Votes	%	Seats	Position	Aftermath
2008	18,279	0.27	0 / 334	48,119	0.70	0 / 137	10th	Extra-parliamentary support to PDL-PSD government (2008–2009)
2008	18,279	0.27	0 / 334	48,119	0.70	0 / 137	10th	Extra-parliamentary support to PDL-UNPR-UDMR (2009–2012)
2008	18,279	0.27	0 / 334	48,119	0.70	0 / 137	10th	Extra-parliamentary opposition to USL government (2012)
