= Șerban Nicolae =

Romanian politician (born 1968)

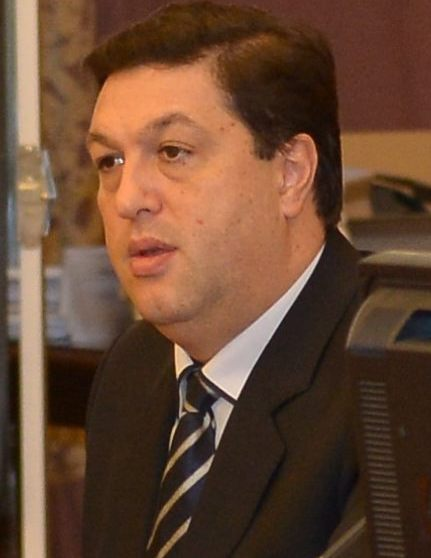
- Nicolae in 2013

Member of the Senate
- In office 20 December 2016 – 21 December 2020

Personal details
- Born: 5 April 1968 (age 58) Bucharest, Romania

Șerban Nicolae (born 5 April 1968) is a Romanian politician who served as senator from 2004 to 2008 and again from 2012 to 2020.

In the 2004 – 2008 legislature, Nicolae was a member of the parliamentary friendship groups with Mongolia, Brazil and Israel. Nicolae had 331 speeches and initiated 38 legislative proposals, of which 10 were enacted into law. Nicolae was a member of the following committees:

- Committee on Defense, Public Order and National Security (since Feb. 2007)
- Legal, Appointments, Discipline, Immunities and Validations Committee (since Feb. 2006) – Vice-president
- Special Committee for Amending and Supplementing the Senate Regulations (since Feb. 2006)
- Committee on Labor, Family and Social Protection (Sep. 2005 – Feb. 2006)
- Special Committee for Amending and Supplementing the Senate Regulations (until Oct. 2005)
- Legal, Appointments, Discipline, Immunities and Validations Commission (until Sep. 2005)

In the 2012 – 2016 legislature, Nicolae was a member of the parliamentary friendship groups with the Republic of Estonia and the State of Israel. Nicolae initiated 70 legislative proposals, of which 16 were enacted into law. Nicolae was a member of the following committees:

- Commission for the Investigation of Abuses, Combating Corruption and Petitions
- Legal, Appointments, Discipline, Immunities and Validations Committee (Feb. – Nov. 2014)

In the 2016 – 2020 legislature, Nicolae is a member of the parliamentary friendship groups with Qatar and the State of Israel.

== Biography ==
He graduated in 1986 from Industrial High School No. 37 (today, "Emil Racoviță" National College) in Bucharest.

He began his political career in 1990, joining the National Salvation Front (FSN). After a conflict arose within this party between the group led by Petre Roman and a conservative -nationalist group, he became one of the founders of the Democratic Front of National Salvation (FDSN), on whose lists he ran in the 1992 parliamentary elections for the Chamber of Deputies.

Initially a worker at the Fine Mechanical Engineering Company in Bucharest, Nicolae attended the Faculty of Law at the Romanian-American University, from which he graduated in 1997. Becoming a lawyer, he defended Ion Iliescu in the lawsuit filed against the then leader of the PSD, during the 2000 electoral campaign, for the use of copyrighted caricatures.

Almost half a year after Ion Iliescu returned to Cotroceni Palace in 2001, Nicolae was appointed state counselor at the Legal Department of the Presidential Administration, a position in which he succeeded Petre Ninosu, who became a judge at the Constitutional Court. In 2004, at the proposal of Prime Minister Adrian Năstase, he was appointed by Ion Iliescu as Minister for Relations with Parliament. In December 2004, he became a senator, elected in Ialomița County, on the PSD lists. He served as Senate Quaestor and, later, Deputy Leader of the PSD Group and Vice President of the Legal Commission for Appointments, Discipline, Immunities and Validations.

Between 2005 and 2006 he was a parliamentarian – observer in the European Parliament, member of the Committee on Constitutional Affairs (AFCO).

He is the author of the first amendment, formulated by a Romanian, which became the text of a Resolution adopted in the European Parliament in 2006. In 2009, at the PSD's proposal, he became Secretary of State, Head of the Schengen Department in the Ministry of Administration and Interior, resigning along with all PSD members of the Government, on 1 October of the same year. In 2010 he became an insolvency practitioner, a member of the Bucharest Branch of the National Union of Insolvency Practitioners of Romania (UNPIR). As a lawyer, he is a founding partner of SCP "Șerban Nicolae și asociății", and as an insolvency practitioner, he is the sole partner of TEMPUS Grup IPURL.

In 2012 he was elected as a senator in College no. 1 of Constituency no. 27 Mehedinți, on the lists of the Social-Liberal Union (USL), proposed by the PSD. In 2016 he was elected senator in electoral district no. 42 Bucharest.
