= Attila Kelemen =

Romanian politician (1948–2022)

Attila Béla Ladislau Kelemen (4 May 1948 – 8 January 2022) was an ethnic Hungarian Romanian politician and Member of the European Parliament. He was a member of the Democratic Alliance of Hungarians in Romania (UDMR/RMDSZ), part of the European People's Party–European Democrats, and became an MEP on 1 January 2007 with the accession of Romania to the European Union. He served in this position until the election that November. Kelemen has also sat in the Chamber of Deputies from 1996 to 2016, representing Mureș County.

Kelemen was born in Târgu Mureș, Romania, on 4 May 1948. He died on 8 January 2022, at the age of 73.
