= Macedonians of Romania =

Macedonians in Romania Македонци во Романија Macedonenii din România
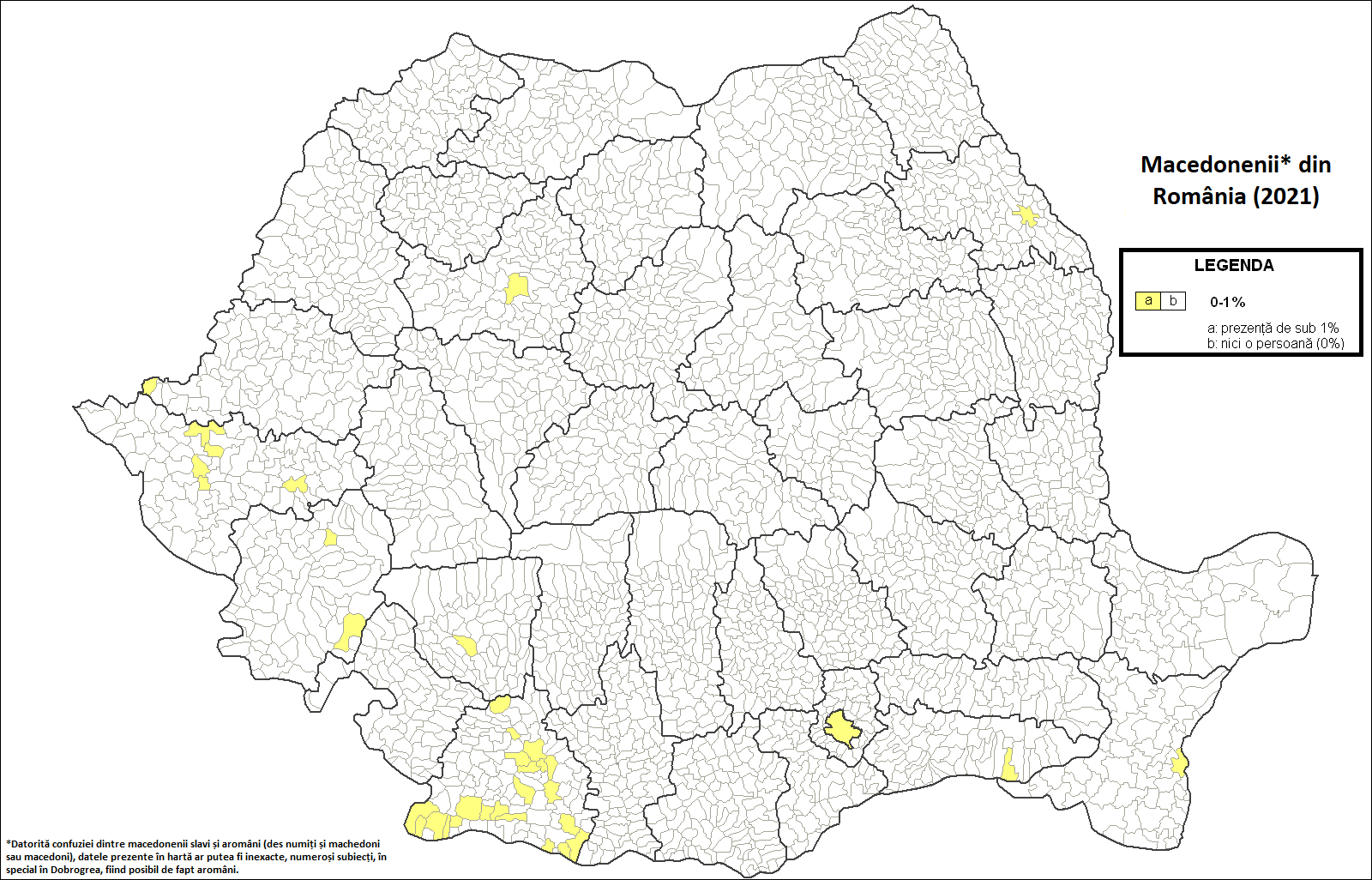

Total population
- 1,089 (2021 Romanian census)

Regions with significant populations
- Bucharest, Galați and Ploiești

Languages
- predominately Romanian and Macedonian Census 2021: 1,089 people have self-identified as Macedonians, 201 have specified their language as Macedonian language

Religion
- Eastern Orthodox

Related ethnic groups
- Macedonians

The Macedonians of Romania are a recognised minority with full minority rights. As of the 2021 census, 1,089 ethnic Macedonians lived in Romania. They are mostly descendants of refugees of the Greek Civil War (1946–1949).

== Immigration ==
The Greek communists formed the Slavomacedonian National Liberation Front in 1943, thus recognizing the Macedonian national identity, during the Axis occupation of Greece. However, the situation deteriorated after the communists lost the Greek Civil War (1946-1949), while the Greek government did not recognize the distinctiveness of the Macedonian nation, that was formed at the same time. Thousands of ethnic Macedonians were expelled and fled to the Eastern Bloc countries. Many were evacuated to Romania. A large evacuation camp was established in the Romanian town of Tulgheș. It was there that many of the younger children were reunited with their parents. It is thought that 5,132 children were evacuated to Romania along with 1,981 men and 1,939 women. The group of children evacuated was the largest in Romania. There in Romania, the most provisions were set up for them across the entire Eastern Bloc, excluding Yugoslavia. That group of children would go on to form the recognized minority group of Macedonians in Romania. According to the 2021 Romanian census, 1,089 individuals declared a Macedonian ethnicity (536 men and 553 women). In the same census, only 201 individuals declared that they spoke the Macedonian language, including 115 men and 86 women. According to the United States Census Bureau, in 2015, there were 186 Macedonians born in Romania living in the U.S. Some of the 243 ethnic Bulgarians living in the U.S. in 2015 who were born in Romania were of Macedonian origin.

== Organisations ==
The Association of Macedonians in Romania was established in 2000 as an ethnic minority political party to represent the Macedonian community. The party has a seat in the Chamber of Deputies. The current member of the Macedonian minority in Romania is Liana Dumitrescu, who has served since 2004, when she replaced Vasile Ioan Savu, in office from 2000. Dumitrescu heads the party, which forms part of the parliamentary group of national minorities. At the 2000 elections the group received 8,000 votes, and in 2004, 3 Macedonian political parties from Romania, lead and participated at election by AMR, obtained more than 25,000 votes. However two other Political Parties, Asociația Macedonenilor din Romania and Asociația Cultura a Macedonenilor din România also polled well with 9595 and 9750 votes respectively.

== See also ==
- Macedonian diaspora
- Immigration to Romania
- Ethnic Macedonians
- Exodus of Ethnic Macedonians from Greece
