= Bogdan Olteanu =

Romanian politician and lawyer

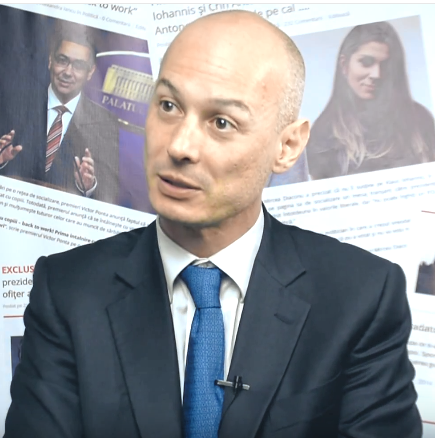

President of the Chamber of Deputies
- In office 20 March 2006 – 19 December 2008
- Preceded by: Adrian Năstase
- Succeeded by: Roberta Anastase

Minister for Parliamentary Relations
- In office 29 December 2004 – 20 March 2006
- Prime Minister: Călin Popescu-Tăriceanu
- Preceded by: Șerban Nicolae
- Succeeded by: Mihai Voicu

Deputy Governor of the National Bank of Romania
- In office 9 October 2009 – 1 August 2016

Personal details
- Born: 29 October 1971 (age 54) Bucharest, Romania
- Party: National Liberal Party (1991–2009)
- Profession: Lawyer

Bogdan Olteanu (born 29 October 1971) is a Romanian politician and lawyer. He was the president of the Chamber of Deputies (the lower house of the Romanian Parliament) between 2006 and 2008.

Olteanu had formerly been a member of the National Liberal Party (PNL) from 1991 to 2009, and held various positions in that political party. He was elected as deputy for Bucharest in the 2004 elections. In 2005, he was appointed Delegate Minister for Parliamentary Affairs in the Government of Călin Popescu-Tăriceanu.

After Adrian Năstase stepped down from the presidency of the Chamber of Deputies, Olteanu was announced by the governing Justice and Truth Alliance (DA) as their preferred candidate for the function. On 20 March 2006 he received a majority of 196 votes out of 306.

In October 2009, the Parliament favoured Bogdan Olteanu for the position of National Bank vice-governor, passing the independent Lucian Croitoru; On 19 October 2009, Olteanu stepped down from his position as vice-president of the Chamber of Deputies, and gave up PNL membership to pursue his post as vice-governor at the National Bank of Romania.

Olteanu and his wife Cristina have two children, Thea (born 2004) and Alexandru (born 2006). He is the grandson of Communist activist Ghizela Vass.

== Honour ==
- (Romania) Romanian Royal Family: Knight Grand Officer of the Order of the Crown

Political offices
Preceded by Șerban Nicolae	Minister for Parliamentary Relations; 2004–2006	Succeeded by Mihai Voicu
Preceded by Adrian Năstase	President of the Chamber of Deputies of Romania; 2006–2008	Succeeded by Roberta Anastase
