= Liana Dumitrescu =

Romanian politician (1973–2011)

Liana Dumitrescu (20 January 1973 – 27 January 2011; Macedonian: Лиана Думитреску) was a Romanian politician and the leader of the Association of Macedonians of Romania, a political party representing the ethnic Macedonians of Romania. She served in the Chamber of Deputies between 2004 and 2011.

She was born in Craiova and graduated with a law degree from the University of Bucharest in 1998. Diagnosed with a rare brain disease, she died shortly after at the Elias Hospital in Bucharest, at age 38. She was buried with military honors at Ungureni Cemetery in Craiova.
