= Romanian Ecologist Party =

Ecologist political party in Romania

Romanian Ecologist Party Partidul Ecologist Român
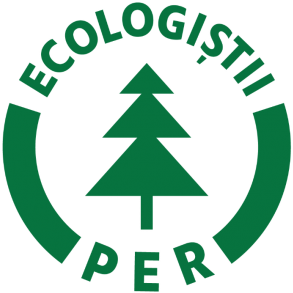
- President: Florin Secară
- Founder: Adrian Manolache
- Founded: January 1990
- Headquarters: Calea Victoriei nr. 91-93; Sector 1 Bucharest
- Youth wing: Tineretul Ecologist Român (TER)
- Ideology: Green conservatism Right-wing populism Romanian nationalism Christian democracy Protectionism; Soft euroscepticism Social conservatism Economic nationalism
- Political position: Fiscal: Centre; Cultural: Right-wing
- National affiliation: AER for Romania (Green and Ecologist) (2023-2024) PRO-PER Alliance (2025-)
- Colors: Green
- Slogan: For a moment nature was not attentive and conceived man; for a moment man is not careful, and nature corrects its mistake"
- Senate: 0 / 136
- Chamber of Deputies: 1 / 330
- European Parliament: 0 / 33
- Mayors: 7 / 3,176
- County councilors: 5 / 1,340
- Local councilors: 372 / 39,900

The Romanian Ecologist Party (Romanian: Partidul Ecologist Român, PER) is an ecologist and currently mostly conservative and green conservative political party in Romania, member of the AER Alliance for Romania (Alianța AER pentru România). Without parliamentary representation, it is one of the microparties still active in the country with some representatives elected in the local administration (i.e. a few mayors and county councillors and 210 local councillors), especially in Râmnicu Vâlcea and Vâlcea County, where it is ranked third behind the National Liberal Party (PNL) and the Social Democratic Party (PSD), Romania's two largest parties. Previously, it collaborated with the Green Party (PV) in the 2008 legislative elections.

== History ==
The party was founded by Adrian Manolache, an engineer, in January 1990 as a political organisation opposed to the National Salvation Front (FSN). Adrian Manolache launched the program and the platform of the PER on 5 January 1990 in the newspaper Libertatea, being one of the newly founded parties in Romania and the second post-1989 registered one after the Christian Democratic National Peasants' Party (PNȚ-CD).

This party opposed the politics of the FSN from a very early stage and entered in an alliance with Radu Câmpeanu's National Liberal Party (PNL) in April, 1990, also endorsing the Timișoara Proclamation (Romanian: Proclamația de la Timișoara) which demanded that the former structures and members of the Romanian Communist Party should not get involved again in post-revolutionary politics.

The PER participated in the Romanian legislative election held in May 1990, winning one senator seat as well as eight deputy seats. The first (and also founding) president of the party was Adrian Manolache, but the first party congress which was held in April 1990 elected Otto Weber as president until 2001, when he was followed by Cornel Protopopescu until 2007, the latter being subsequently replaced by Dănuț Pop.

In the summer of 2023, the Ecologists announced a restart for the political formation, with a new leadership and announced that they are recalibrating their public agenda in accordance with the themes of the day, from food safety to protecting the environment, in an increasingly complicated context for agriculture and environment in general.

== Notable members ==
- Viorica Edelhauser, former deputy (between 1990 and 1992);
- Cornel Protopopescu, former deputy (between 1990 and 2000);
- Otto Ernest Weber, second president of the party;
- Gheorghe Toma, former mayor of the city of Suceava, Suceava County, Bukovina.

== Electoral history ==
=== Legislative elections ===
Election	Chamber			Senate			Position
Election	Votes	%	Seats	Votes	%	Seats	Position
1990	232,212	1.69	8 / 395	192,574	1.38	1 / 119	8th
1992	Part of CDR		4 / 341	Part of CDR		0 / 143	2nd
1996	Part of CDR		5 / 343	Part of CDR		1 / 143	1st
2000	101,256	0.84	0 / 345	108,370	0.99	0 / 140	10th
2004	73,001	0.72	0 / 332	83,771	0.80	0 / 137	8th
2008	Part of PVE		0 / 334	Part of PVE		0 / 137	10th
2012	58,178	0.79	0 / 412	58,335	0.79	0 / 176	7th
2016	62,414	0.89	0 / 329	77,218	1.09	0 / 136	9th
2020	65,807	1.12	0 / 330	78,654	1.33	0 / 136	8th
2024	38,561	0.42	0 / 330	34,641	0.37	0 / 136	9th

=== Presidential elections ===
Election	Candidate	First round			Second round		
Election	Candidate	Votes	%	Position	Votes	%	Position
1990	did not compete						
1992	Endorsed Emil Constantinescu of the Romanian Democratic Convention						
1996	Endorsed Emil Constantinescu of the Romanian Democratic Convention						
2000	did not compete						
2004	did not compete						
2009	Ovidiu-Cristian Iane	22,511	0.23	11th			
2014	William Brînză	43,194	0.45	12th			
2019	did not compete						
2024	Endorsed independent candidate Cristian Diaconescu						
2025	Endorsed independent candidate Victor Ponta						

=== European elections ===
Election	Votes	%	MEPs	Position	EU Party	EP Group
2007	did not compete					
2009	did not compete					
2014	64,232	1.15%	0 / 32	10th	—	—
2019	did not compete (endorsed the Social Democratic Party)					

== See also ==
- List of environmental organizations
