= Roberta Anastase =

Romanian politician (born 1976)

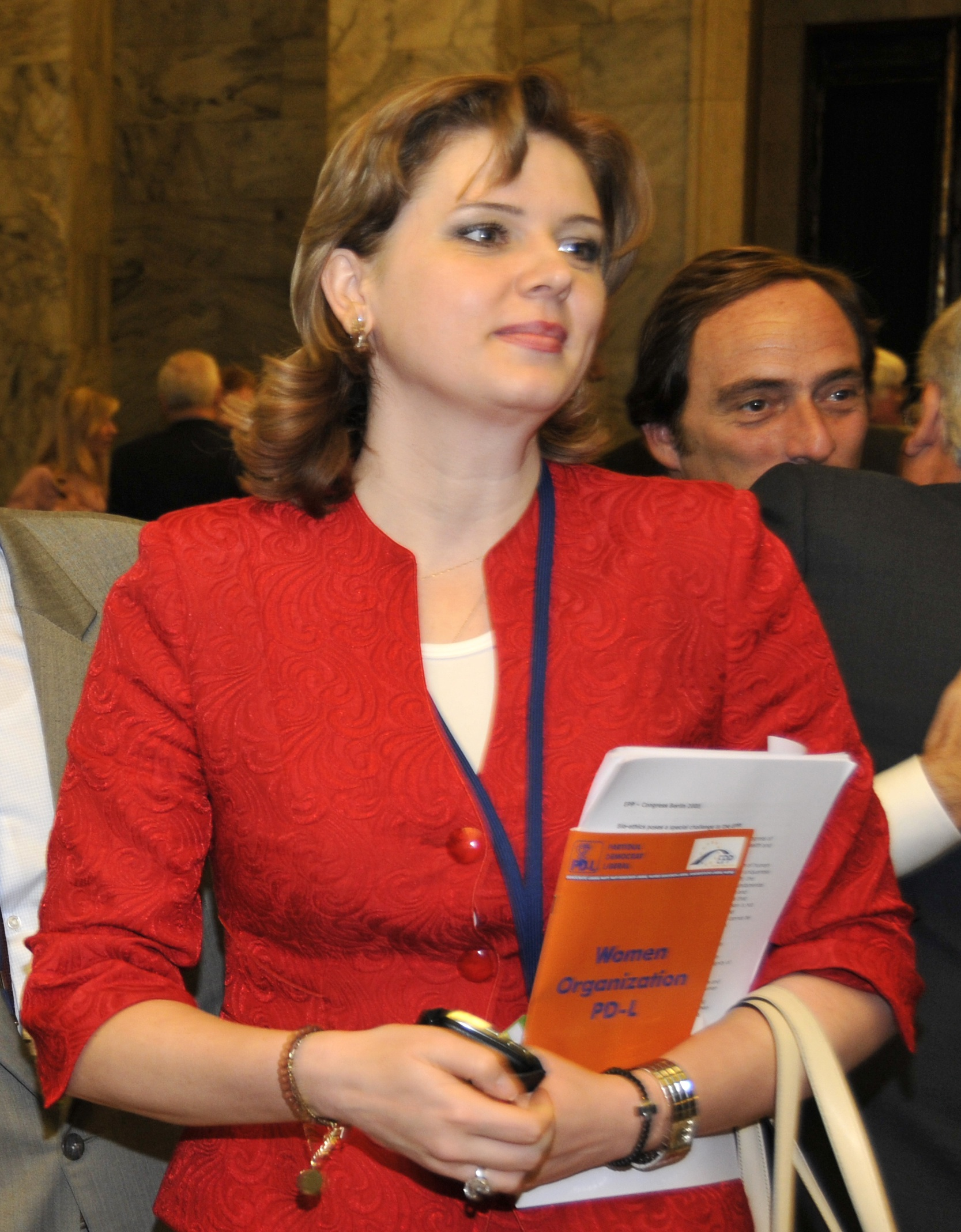

President of the Chamber of Deputies of Romania
- In office 19 December 2008 – 3 July 2012
- Preceded by: Bogdan Olteanu
- Succeeded by: Valeriu Zgonea
- Constituency: Prahova

Personal details
- Born: 27 March 1976 (age 50) Socialist Republic of Romania
- Party: Democratic Liberal Party (PDL)
- Education: University of Bucharest

Roberta Alma Anastase (Romanian pronunciation: [roˈberta anasˈtase]; born 27 March 1976 in Ploiești, Romania) is a Romanian politician and former first female President of the Chamber of Deputies of Romania between 19 December 2008 and 3 July 2012.

She was a member of the Democratic Liberal Party (PDL), affiliated to the European People's Party–European Democrats, and became an MEP on 1 January 2007 with the accession of Romania to the European Union. She also represented Romania at the 1996 Miss Universe competition.

== Early life ==
She attended the Faculty of Sociology at the University of Bucharest in the mid-1990s and from 1998 to 2000 she has in-depth her studies in the field of the European issues by studying at the Faculty of Political Sciences of the same university. She was concerned about European and Romanian political systems as well as issues related to citizens' participation in democratic life, their presence in the polls and how the citizens are influenced by electoral campaigns.

In November 2006 and November 2008, she was a member of the European Parliament, the member of the Committee on Foreign Affairs and the Deputy Head of the Subcommittee on Security and Defense.

Her father, Cornel Anastase, before 1989 was a director of the 1st May factory in Ploiești, and then, a sub-prefect of Prahova County.

== Professional activity ==
- 1994–1995: Assistant Researcher at the Center for Political Studies and Comparative Analysis
- 1998–2000: Director of public relations - commercial company
- 17/07/2000–27/12/2000: adviser to the Minister of Transport
- 2001–present: Parliamentary expert
- 2001–2004: Commercial company director

== Political activity ==
Functions, activities in the institution of the central or local public administration

- 17/07/2000–27/12/2000: Adviser to the Minister of Transport

=== Civic activity ===
- 2001–2003: Vice-President of the Youth Council of Romania (C.T.R.)
- 2002–2003: Member of the Joint Youth Policy Monitoring Group in Romania at the Ministry of Youth and Sport - Youth Council of Romania

=== The President of the Chamber of Deputies ===
On December 20, 2008 she became the President of the Chamber of Deputies, elected by 218 votes. Her opponents were Ludovic Orban (with 69 votes) and László Borbély (with 26 votes). She was also the first woman who chaired the Chamber of Deputies and the youngest person who held this position (aged 32 at that time).

== Awards ==
- Citizen of Honor of the State of Nebraska, USA
- Honorary citizen of District Heights, Maryland, USA

== Other activities ==
- 1996: Won Miss Universe Romania contest;
- 2001: Participated in launching of the European Youth White Paper, Belgium;
- 2002: Participated in the "Inter-ministerial Committee responsible for European Youth Policy", Greece;
- 2004: Participated in the program "Romania in the United States of America" organised by the American Council for Young Political Leaders and Pluralism Foundation.

== Controversies ==
On 15 September 2010 Anastase headed the meeting of the Chamber when the pension bill passed. As chairman of the meeting, when putting the bill to the vote, she counted the deputies, stating that the quorum was reached, although there were only 80 deputies present - and therefore that the bill passed. According to Ms. Anastase, more than 160 deputies voted, even 270. The National Liberal Party (PNL) and Social Democratic Party (PSD) groups had previously left the session and thus refrained from voting. On 6 October 2010 the Constitutional Court rejected the appeals filed by PNL and PSD and declared the law constitutional. President Traian Băsescu returned the law for a new debate to the Parliament, but for other reasons than those claimed by the opposition.

On 3 July 2012, after the political majority in the parliament had changed when several members of the Democratic Liberal Party (PDL) ruling party migrated to other parties (especially to the Social Liberal Union, USL), Roberta Anastase was revoked from the position of President of the Chamber of Deputies and was replaced by Valeriu Zgonea (PSD).

Awards and achievements
| Preceded by Monika Grosu | Miss Universe Romania; 1996 | Succeeded by Diana Maria Urdareanu |
Political offices
| Preceded by Bogdan Olteanu | President of the Romanian Chamber of Deputies; 2008-2012 | Succeeded by Valeriu Zgonea |
