= Cătălin Cherecheș =

Romanian politician

Mayor of Baia Mare
- In office 8 May 2011 – 29 November 2023
- Preceded by: Cristian Anghel

Member of the Chamber of Deputies
- In office 2008–2011
- Constituency: Maramureș

Personal details
- Born: July 7, 1978 (age 48) Baia Mare, Romania
- Party: PSD (2005–2010; 2011–2013); PNL (2010–2011); UNPR (2013–2016); Coalition for Baia Mare (2016–present)
- Occupation: Politician

Cătălin Cherecheș (born July 7, 1978) is a Romanian politician, who was the mayor of Baia Mare from May 8, 2011 and November 29, 2023. Cherecheș was charged with corruption in 2016, and arrested in Germany in November 2023. He began serving his prison sentence in Aiud Prison in Romania in March 2024.

== Biography ==
Between 2005 and 2007, Cherecheș was the vice president and spokesperson of the Maramureș County organization of the Social Democratic Party.

Cherecheș was elected in 2008 to the Chamber of Deputies on the Social Democratic Party. He resigned the party in February 2010, becoming an independent member of Parliament and in May 2010 joined the National Liberal Party.

In May 2011, following the criminal conviction of mayor Cristian Anghel, a by-election was held in Baia Mare. Cherecheș was named candidate of the Social Liberal Union. He won the elections from the first round, getting 18,298 votes (51,66%). Following his election, he resigned from the Parliament.

In 2011, the local administration built a 1.8 metres (5 ft 11 in) tall wall between the road Strada Horea and an area of social housing that houses 1,000 Roma people into one-room apartments, some without water or electricity. According to Cherecheș, this wall was designed to "prevent traffic accidents", while some civic organizations said it amounted to a "Roma wall" and "institutionalized racism". Later in 2011, the national anti-discrimination council fined Cherecheș for building the wall and ordered it to be pulled down.

During the 2012 Romanian local elections, again as the candidate of the Social Liberal Union, he was re-elected mayor of Baia Mare, receiving 44,239 votes (86.03%), far ahead of Democratic Liberal candidate Ștefan Pop, who received only 2,785 votes.

In September 2013, Cherecheș joined the National Union for the Progress of Romania.

On May 20, 2016, Cherecheș was charged with corruption.

Nevertheless, on June 5, 2016 Cherecheș ran as a candidate of the local Coalition for Baia Mare and was re-elected mayor while detained with 70.28% of the votes counted, according to the partial election results, a first in Romanian politics.

Shortly before being sentenced, Cherecheș fled to Germany in November 2023, but was caught just four days later. Cherecheș awaited extradition until March 2024, when he began serving his prison sentence in Aiud Prison, back in Romania. As of September 2024, he remains incarcerated at Aiud Prison, and is eligible for parole in August 2026.
