= Valeriu Zgonea =

Romanian politician

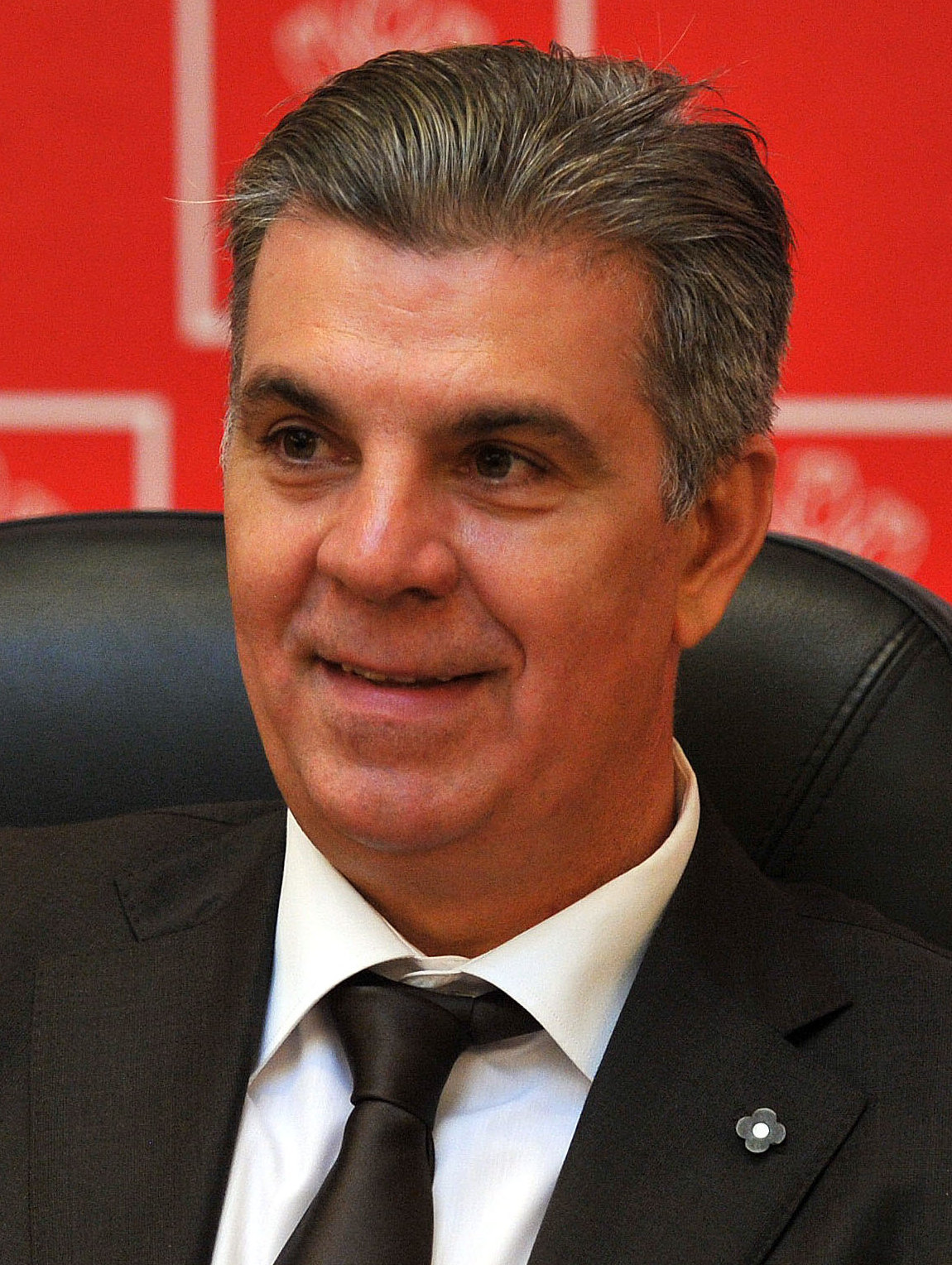
- Valeriu Zgonea at the 2013 National Executive Committee (CexN) of the PSD

President of the Chamber of Deputies of Romania
- In office 3 July 2012 – 13 June 2016
- Preceded by: Roberta Anastase
- Succeeded by: Florin Iordache

Personal details
- Born: Valeriu Ștefan Zgonea; 3 September 1967 (age 58) Craiova, Dolj County, Socialist Republic of Romania
- Party: Social Democratic Party (until 27 April 2016)

Valeriu Ștefan Zgonea (born 3 September 1967 in Craiova, Dolj County, Socialist Republic of Romania) is a Romanian politician who served as President of the Chamber of Deputies of Romania between 3 July 2012 and 13 June 2016. On 18 October 2015, he was elected as Social Democratic Party Executive President. On 27 April 2016, he was expelled from PSD following his statements against party chairman Liviu Dragnea.

== Studies ==
Valeriu Zgonea attended the courses of the "Frații Buzești" National College from Craiova from 1981 till 1985. He was admitted to the Faculty of Railways, Roads and Bridges Construction in the Bucharest Institute of Civil Engineering.

He attended the Ministry of Youth and Sports courses on human resources management and project management. In January 2001, he participated in the Program for the Study of Political Communication and Media Relations, held in Washington by the National Democratic Institute of the Ministry of Foreign Affairs. During the same period he graduated the negotiation course organized by the United States Institute of Peace. In March 2001, the courses of A.C.Y.P.L. (American Council of Youth Political Leaders). In August 2001, he was a student at the University of Amsterdam, following Professor Phil Nobel's famous course "Internet and Politics".

== Family ==
Valeriu Zgonea married Laura Zgonea in 2014. He has a son Dragoș Alexandru, from the previous marriage with Cristina and a daughter, Maria, from a previous relationship.
