= Vasile cabinet =

113th cabinet of Romania (1998-99)

Vasile I
- 113th Cabinet of Romania
- Date formed: 17 April 1998
- Date dissolved: 22 December 1999

People and organisations
- Head of state: Emil Constantinescu
- Head of government: Radu Vasile
- Head of government's history: Alexandru Athanasiu (interim)
- Member party: PNȚ-CD, PNL, PD, UDMR, PSDR
- Status in legislature: Majority
- Opposition party: PDSR, PRM
- Opposition leader: Ion Iliescu, Corneliu Vadim Tudor

History
- Election: -
- Outgoing election: -
- Legislature term: 1996–2000
- Budget: One
- Predecessor: Ciorbea
- Successor: Isărescu

The Vasile Cabinet was the 113th cabinet of Romania, which was formed 17 April 1998 and dissolved 22 December 1999, with Radu Vasile as head of government. It was a coalition cabinet formed between the winner of the elections, CDR (Convenția Democrată Română, the Romanian Democratic Convention, which included PNȚ-CD, PNL, PER), USD (Uniunea Social Democrată, the Social Democratic Union, which included PD and PSDR), and UDMR.

== Members ==
Coalition members: PNȚ-CD, PD, PNL, UDMR, PSDR, and Independent ministers

Prime Minister:

- Radu Vasile/Alexandru Athanasiu (ad interim)

Ministers of State:

- Victor Babiuc
- Valeriu Stoica

Ministers:

- Valeriu Stoica (Justice)
- Victor Babiuc (Defense)
- Daniel Dăianu/Decebal Traian Remeș (Finance)
- Ion Caramitru (Culture)
- Nicolae Noica (Public Works)
- Dinu Gavrilescu/Ioan Avram Mureșan (Agriculture)
- Francisc Baranyi/Gábor Hajdú (Health)
- Andrei Pleșu (Foreign Affairs)
- Radu Berceanu (Industry and Commerce)
- Alexandru Athanasiu (Labor)
- Sorin Pantiș (Communications)
- Romică Tomescu (Environment)
- Traian Băsescu (Transport)
- Gavril Dejeu/Constantin Dudu Ionescu (Interior)
- Andrei Marga (Education)
- Ioan Avram Mureşan/Victor Babiuc (Reform)
- Horia Ene/Valeriu Stoica (Research and Technology)
- Crin Antonescu (Youth and Sport)
- Alexandru Sassu (Relation with Parliament)
- Sorin Frunzăverde (Tourism)

Minister-Delegates:

- Alexandru Herlea (European Integration)
- György Tokay/Péter Eckstein-Kovács (National Minorities)
