= Romanian Democratic Convention =

Electoral alliance in Romania

Romanian Democratic Convention Convenția Democrată Română
- Abbreviation: CDR
- Leader: Corneliu Coposu; Ion Rațiu; Ion Diaconescu; Emil Constantinescu
- Founded: 26 November 1991
- Dissolved: 2000
- Ideology: Christian democracy; Environmentalism
- Political position: Centre-right
- Colours: Blue
- Slogan: Romanian: Cheia e la tine! (You hold the key)

The Romanian Democratic Convention (Romanian: Convenția Democrată Română or Convenția Democratică Română; abbreviated CDR) was an electoral alliance of several centre-right political parties in Romania, active from 1991 until 2000. The most prominent leaders of the CDR throughout the 1990s were by far Corneliu Coposu, Ion Rațiu, and Ion Diaconescu, all three members of the Christian Democratic National Peasants' Party (PNȚCD) - successor and political heir to the National Peasants' Party (PNȚ), active in the Kingdom of Romania between 1926 and 1948).

The name of the CDR was coined by Sergiu Cunescu, the leader of the Romanian Social Democratic Party (PSDR), as stated in an interview during the 1990s by former PNL re-founding president Radu Câmpeanu at Marius Tucă Show by talk show journalist Marius Tucă. An additional minor leader of the Romanian Democratic Convention (CDR) was lawyer and MP Niculae Cerveni (who founded PNL-CD in 1992 and subsequently ran for president on behalf of PLDR in 2000).

== History ==
=== Political composition ===
Seat allocation following the 1990 election
Party	Parliament Seats	
Party	Chamber	Senate
PNL	29	10
PNȚCD	12	1
PER	8	1
PSDR	2	—N/a
Total	51 / 395	12 / 119

The core members of the CDR included the following political parties:

- Christian Democratic National Peasants' Party (PNȚCD): (1991–2000);
- Ecologist Federation of Romania (FER): (1991–2000);
- Romanian Ecologist Party (PER): (1991–2000);
- Civic Alliance Party (PAC): (1991–1995);
- Romanian Social Democratic Party (PSDR): (1991–1995);
- Democratic Union of Hungarians in Romania (UDMR/RMDSZ): (1991–1992, 1992–1995);
- National Liberal Party (PNL): (1991–1992, 1993–1999);
- National Liberal Party-Democratic Convention (PNL-CD): (1992–1997);
- National Liberal Party-Youth Wing (PNL-AT): (1992–1993);
- Liberal Party '93 (PL ’93): (1993–1995);
- Union of Right-leaning Forces (PAR, then UFD): 1996–2000;
- National Christian Democratic Alliance (ANCD): (1999–2000);
- The Moldavians' Party (PM): (1999–2000).

Eventually, some parties left (more specifically, the main faction of the PNL between 1992 and 1996, as well as the PAC, PSDR, and UDMR/RMDSZ in 1995), while other minor parties joined or were created between mergers within the alliance such as the Liberal Party '93 (PL '93) or the Union of Right-leaning Forces (UFD).

=== 1991–1992: Foundation ===
Seat allocation following the 1992 election
Party	Parliament Seats	
Party	Chamber	Senate
PNȚCD	41	21
PAC	13	7
PNL-AT	11	1
PSDR	10	1
PNL-CD	3	4
PER	4	—N/a
Total	82 / 341	34 / 143

CDR was founded in 1991, one year before the 1992 elections, mainly by the PNȚCD and the National Liberal Party (PNL). In addition, aside from the aforementioned political forces, several other noteworthy civic and cultural organisations, foundations, and other minor political parties were involved in the foundational process.

Initially, the planned name of the CDR was "The National Convention for Democracy Implementation" (Romanian: Convenţia Națională pentru Implementarea Democrației). Subsequently, the main purpose of the CDR was to amount an effective opposition against the then all-dominating National Salvation Front (FSN), a huge parliamentary bloc made up mostly of former second and third rank members of the Romanian Communist Party (PCR), which assumed leadership of the country shortly after the 1989 Revolution. According to a later interview by Emil Constantinescu, the former President of Romania claimed that the FSN was actually made of former first rank members of the PCR.

=== 1992–1996: Opposition ===
For the period 1992–1996, CDR was the main political opposition force in the Parliament of Romania and in the local administration as well. Although the convention won the capital city of Bucharest and much of the larger urban centres at the 1992 local elections, FSN swept over almost all rural areas and small towns.

The alliance also included the UDMR/RMDSZ, which ran on a separate list, and a number of minor parties and civic organisations that failed to gain parliamentary representation: the Democratic Unity Party, the Christian Democratic Union, the Ecologist Federation of Romania (FER), the Civic Alliance (PAC), and others. Prior to the 1992 general elections, the PNL led by Radu Câmpeanu withdrew from the CDR.

At the 1992 general elections, Emil Constantinescu was the presidential candidate of the convention. He managed to qualify in the second round where he finished second with an electoral score of 38.57% (or 4,641,207 votes).

=== 1996–2000: Government ===
Seat allocation following the 1996 election
Party	Parliament Seats	
Party	Chamber	Senate
PNȚCD	81	25
PNL	28	22
PNL-CD	4	1
PAR	3	3
PER	5	1
FER	1	1
Total	122 / 343	53 / 143

In 1993, the PNL led by Mircea Ionescu-Quintus returned within the CDR. Subsequently, the CDR managed to win the 1996 Romanian elections, and the alliance's presidential candidate, once again Emil Constantinescu, became president with 54.41% (or 7,057,906 votes). The 1996 Romanian general election represented the first peaceful transition of power in the democratic history of Romania after the fall of Communism.

For the period 1996–2000, the CDR formed a grand coalition with the Social Democratic Union (an alliance between the Democratic Party and PSDR) and the UDMR/RMDSZ (Democratic Union of Hungarians in Romania). At governing level, this grand coalition resulted in the Ciorbea Cabinet (1996–1998), Vasile Cabinet (1998–1999), and Isărescu Cabinet (1999–2000).

=== 2000–2004: CDR 2000 and extra-parliamentary opposition ===
Due to internal frictions within the alliance (as well as given the somewhat inconsistent and turbulent governing from 1996 to 2000), the PNL decided to withdraw from the CDR prior to the 2000 general elections. Nonetheless, PNȚCD and other parties ran on the CDR 2000 common list for these elections. The alliance did not manage to score the same positive results as it did during the 1990s and, consequently, shortly disbanded since it did not pass the electoral threshold. However, it expressed extra-parliamentary opposition between 2000 and 2004 towards the minority PDSR government led by Adrian Năstase.

== Presidents and notable leaders ==
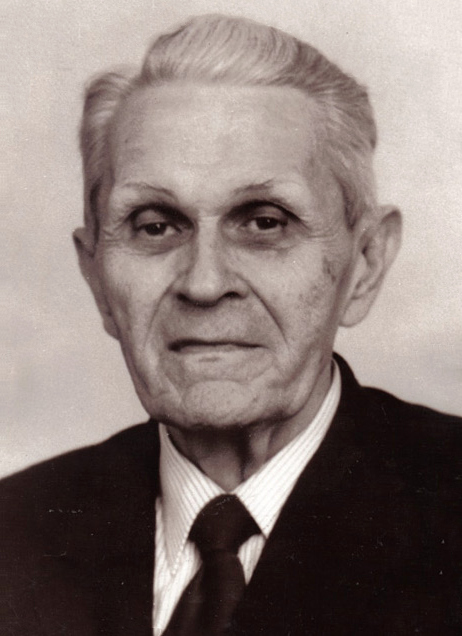
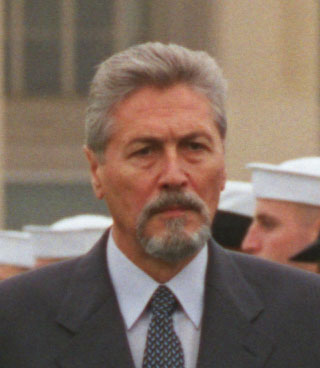
The two presidents of the CDR: Corneliu Coposu (left) and Emil Constantinescu (right)
- Corneliu Coposu (PNȚCD, early to mid 1990s);
- Ion Rațiu (PNȚCD, early 1990s);
- Ion Diaconescu (PNȚCD, early to late 1990s);
- Emil Constantinescu (PNȚCD, late 1990s);
- Radu Câmpeanu (PNL, only during the early 1990s);
- Mircea Ionescu-Quintus (PNL, mid to late 1990s);
- Niculae Cerveni (PNL, early 1990s, PNL-CD early to late 1990s);
- Géza Domokos (UDMR/RMDSZ, early 1990s);
- György Frunda (UDMR/RMDSZ, mid 1990s to late 1990s);
- Sergiu Cunescu (PSDR, early to mid 1990s);
- Otto Weber (PER, early to late 1990s);
- Marcian Bleahu (FER, early to late 1990s).

As of mid 2023, of all the aforementioned leaders of the CDR, only Constantinescu and Frunda are still alive.

== Electoral history ==
=== Legislative elections ===
Election	Chamber			Senate			Position	Aftermath
Election	Votes	%	Seats	Votes	%	Seats	Position	Aftermath
1992	2,117,144	19.46	82 / 341	2,210,722	20.16	34 / 143	2nd ^{1}	Opposition to PDSR-PUNR-PRM-PSM government (1992–1996)
1996	3,692,321	30.17	122 / 343	3,772,084	30.70	53 / 143	1st ^{2}	CDR-USD-UDMR government (1996–2000)
2000	546,135	5.04	0 / 140	575,706	5.29	0 / 140	6th (as CDR 2000)^{3}	Extra-parliamentary opposition to PDSR minority government (2000–2004)

Notes:

^{1} CDR members in 1992: PNȚCD (21 senators and 41 deputies), PAC (7 senators and 13 deputies), PNL-AT (1 senator and 11 deputies), PSDR (1 senator and 10 deputies), PNL-CD (4 senators and 3 deputies), and PER (no senators and 4 deputies).
^{2} CDR members in 1996: PNȚCD (25 senators and 81 deputies), PNL (22 senators and 28 deputies), PNL-CD (1 senator and 4 deputies), PAR (3 senators and 3 deputies), PER (1 senator and 5 deputies), and Ecologist Federation of Romania (FER - 1 senator and 1 deputy).
^{3} CDR 2000 members: PNȚCD, UFD, Ecologist Federation of Romania (FER), National Christian Democratic Alliance (ANCD), and The Moldavians Party (PM).

=== Local elections ===
==== National results ====
Election	County Councilors (CJ)			Mayors			Local Councilors (CL)			Popular vote	%	Position
Election	Votes	%	Seats	Votes	%	Seats	Votes	%	Seats	Popular vote	%	Position
1996	1,667,417	19.53	307 / 1,718	2,712,852	26.27	355 / 2,954	1,786,077	19.58	6,525 / 33,429	—N/a	—N/a	2nd

Election	County Presidents (PCJ)			Position
Election	Votes	%	Seats	Position
1992	—N/a	—N/a	6 / 41	2nd
1996	—N/a	—N/a	15 / 41	2nd
2000	—N/a	—N/a	1 / 41	4th

==== Mayor of Bucharest ====
Election	Candidate	First round			Second round		
Election	Candidate	Votes	Percentage	Position	Votes	Percentage	Position
1996	Victor Ciorbea	—N/a	39.61%	1st	—N/a	56.74%	1st

=== Presidential elections ===
Election	Candidate	First round			Second round		
Election	Candidate	Votes	Percentage	Position	Votes	Percentage	Position
1992	Emil Constantinescu^{1}	3,717,006	31.1%	2nd	4,641,207	38.6%	2nd
1996	Emil Constantinescu^{1}	3,569,941	28.2%	2nd	7,057,906	54.4%	1st
2000	Mugur Isărescu^{2}	1,069,463	9.5%	4th	not qualified		

Notes:

^{1} Emil Constantinescu was the common centre-right candidate who was endorsed by the PNȚCD both in 1992 and 1996 as part of the CDR.
^{2} Mugur Isărescu was endorsed by the PNȚCD at the 2000 elections as part of the re-named CDR 2000 alliance.

== See also ==
- Politics of Romania
- List of political parties in Romania

== Bibliography ==
- Dan Pavel, Iulia Huia, <<Nu putem reuşi decît împreună.>> O istorie analitică a Convenţiei Democratice, 1989-2000, Editura Polirom, Iaşi, 2003, ISBN 978-973-681-260-6 ;
- Roper, Steven D., <<From Opposition to Government Coalition: Unity and Fragmentation within the Democratic Convention of Romania.>>, East European Quarterly, 1997. Vol. 31, 4: 519–542.
