= Christian Democratic National Peasants' Party =

Romanian political party

Christian Democratic National Peasants' Party Partidul Național Țărănesc Creștin Democrat
- Abbreviation: PNȚCD
- Leader: Aurelian Pavelescu
- Founded: December 1989
- Preceded by: National Peasants' Party
- Headquarters: Carol I Boulevard, nr. 24; Sector 2, Bucharest
- Ideology: Agrarianism; Christian democracy; National conservatism; Monarchism; Euroscepticism; Historical: Pro-Europeanism; Atlanticism
- Political position: Centre-right to right-wing
- Regional affiliation: Coalition for Baia Mare (2016)
- European affiliation: EPP (1987–2017); ECPP (since 2020)
- European Parliament group: European Conservatives and Reformists Group (2020–2023)
- International affiliation: Centrist Democrat International
- Colours: Green and blue
- Senate: 0 / 136
- Chamber of Deputies: 0 / 330
- European Parliament (Romanian seats): 0 / 33
- Mayors: 0 / 3,176
- County Councilors: 0 / 1,340
- Local Councilors: 0 / 39,900

Website
- www.pntcd.ro

The Christian Democratic National Peasants' Party (Romanian: Partidul Național Țărănesc Creștin Democrat, PNȚCD) is an agrarian, monarchist and Christian democratic political party in Romania. It claims to be the rightful successor of the interwar National Peasants' Party (PNȚ), created from the merger of the Romanian National Party (PNR) from the then Austro-Hungarian-ruled Transylvania and the Peasants' Party (PȚ) from the Romanian Old Kingdom.

PNȚCD was the largest and most important political party of the Romanian Democratic Convention (Romanian: Convenția Democrată Română, CDR) during the 1990s and was led by Corneliu Coposu and Ion Diaconescu, two former political prisoners during communism, but as the 2000s began it gradually fell out of grace amongst centre-right Romanian voters and slowly became an inactive microparty. The party was subsequently excluded from the European People's Party (EPP) in June 2017. Eventually, it joined the European Christian Political Party (ECPP, then the European Christian Political Movement) in February 2020.

Given a tremendous disdain and resentment towards Pavelescu's leadership (the incumbent party president since 2011 onwards), another Christian peasant group known as the National Peasant Alliance (Romanian: Alianța Național Țărăniștă – Țărăniștii, ANȚ) seceded from the main PNȚCD in 2019 (which, according to them and their electoral basin, greatly drifted from its original ideology) and centered around leader Radu Ghidău (one of the youngest PNȚCD MPs during the legislature of the late 1990s, more specifically the one spanning over 1996–2000) for the 2020 Romanian local elections.

== History ==
=== 1989–1992 ===
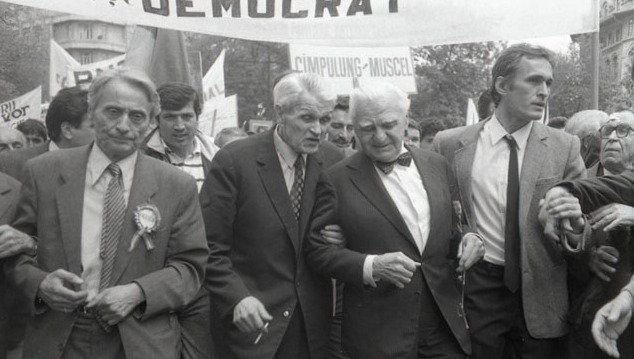
From left to right: Ion Diaconescu, Corneliu Coposu, and Ion Rațiu at a 1990 manifestation held in Bucharest

The Christian Democratic National Peasants' Party was (re)-founded by Corneliu Coposu, Ioan Alexandru, and Ion Rațiu in December 1989, being thus the first officially registered political party after the fall of communism. The party competed in the 1990 elections, where it ranked 4th with 2.5% (or 348,637 votes) and endorsed Ion Rațiu for president. The PNȚCD presidential candidate ranked 3rd, with 4.3% (or 617,007 votes).

Given the political dominance of the National Salvation Front (FSN) that was exerted prior and after the first free elections in post-1989 Romania, the PNȚCD decided to form a consistent alliance of centre-right parties aiming mainly to oppose it.

As a result, in 1991, most notably alongside the National Liberal Party (PNL; but also with other noteworthy civic organisations, foundations, and minor additional right-leaning political parties), the PNȚCD formed the Romanian Democratic Convention (CDR).

Eventually, the PNȚCD would affirm itself as the most dominant internal political force for much of the convention's existence. For the period 1990–1992, PNȚCD was one of the main opposition parties.

=== 1992–1996 ===
At the 1992 elections, the party ran on a common CDR list (along with other allied parties within the convention) and endorsed the candidacy of Emil Constantinescu as President of Romania. Consequently, the CDR ranked 2nd, having scored 20.16% (or 2,210,722 votes), while Emil Constantinescu managed to qualify in the second round of the presidential election where he finished second with 38.57% (or 4,641,207 votes). For the period 1992–1996, the party was the main opposition force in the Parliament of Romania.

=== 1996–2000 ===
At the 1996 elections, CDR managed to rank 1st, with 30.70% (or 3,772,084 votes), and once again endorsed Emil Constantinescu, who also managed to win the presidency with 54.41% (or 7,057,906 votes). For the period 1996–2000, PNȚCD was the most important governing party within the CDR, being also part of a grand coalition which included the Democratic Party (PD) and the Democratic Union of Hungarians in Romania (UDMR/RMDSZ).

At the 2000 elections, PNȚCD ran on a common CDR 2000 list and scored 5.30% (or 575,706 votes), being unable to pass the electoral threshold required for an alliance. This weak electoral result was primarily owed to the fragmentation of the alliance and the scission of the Romanian right into several other parties as well as to the tumultuous previous governing term. For the period 2000–2004, PNȚCD was in extra-parliamentary opposition.

=== 2004–2008 ===
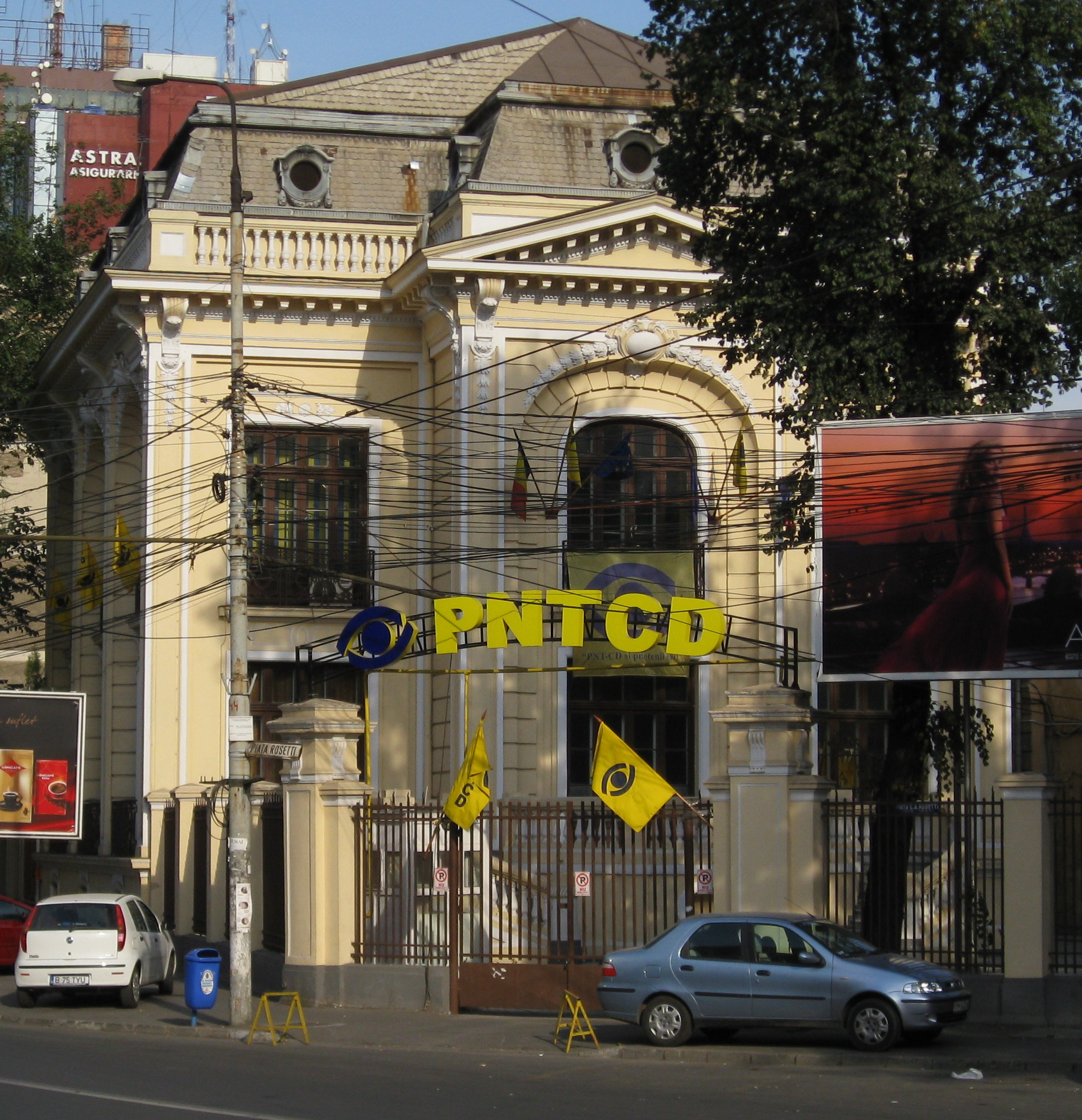
PNȚCD headquarters in September 2008

At the 2004 elections, PNȚCD ran independently, having obtained 1.9% (or 196,027 votes), failing this time as well to surpass the needed electoral threshold. The party endorsed the presidential candidacy of Gheorghe Ciuhandu, former mayor of Timișoara. Ciuhandu eventually ranked 5th in the first round, with 1.9% (or 198,394 votes).

In March 2005, PNȚCD voted to change its name to the Christian Democratic People's Party (Romanian: Partidul Popular Creștin-Democrat, PPCD) after the unification with the Union for Romanian Reconstruction. Eventually, it returned to its original name (PNȚCD). The party did not compete in the 2008 legislative elections.

Afterwards, the party was split between a wing sustained by Marian Petre Miluț endorsing Aurelian Pavelescu as president (who decided on an alliance with the then governing Democratic Liberal Party, PDL) and one endorsing former Prime Minister and Bucharest mayor Victor Ciorbea as president (who, at that time, favoured an alliance with the National Liberal Party).

=== 2011–present ===
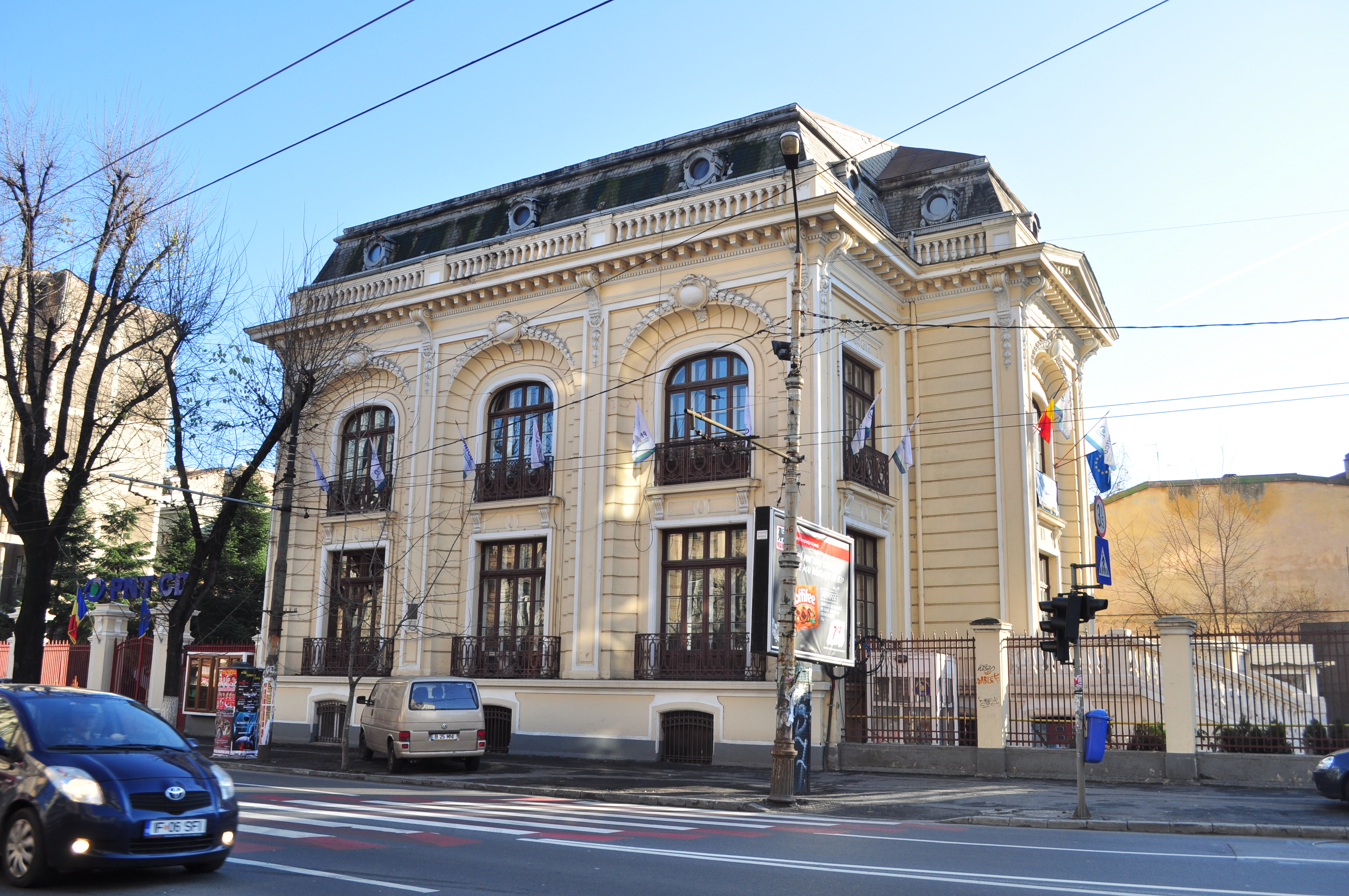
Party headquarters in Bucharest in December 2014

Victor Ciorbea was elected on 18 June 2011 president of the party. In September 2011, the Bucharest Courthouse (responsible for the parties registry) recognised Victor Ciorbea as party president. Nonetheless, the split continued until Ciorbea left the party (until October 2012 namely) in order to become a senator on PNL's lists. Pavelescu was subsequently recognised as president and the fractions were dissolved.

For the 2012 legislative elections, PNȚCD ran on a common Right Romania Alliance (ARD), along with the Democratic Liberal Party (PDL), and the Civic Force (FC). The party won one senator seat and one deputy seat. On 23 April 2013, Pavelescu was elected president of the party.

At the 2014 European Parliament election, the party gained only 0.89% of the cast votes, with candidates like former EP member Sebastian Bodu and the current party president, Aurelian Pavelescu, opening the list.

Following the 2019 European Parliament election and thanks to an agreement between the party and the Social Democratic Party (PSD), the party has 1 MEP, more specifically Cristian Terheș.

For the 2019 Romanian presidential election, the party did not compete but endorsed PSD candidate Viorica Dăncilă. Furthermore, the party did not compete for the 2020 Romanian parliamentary election but it did compete for the 2020 Romanian local elections, where it won 1 mayor and 42 local councillors.

== Motto ==
Its motto as of 2006 was Fiecare contează (Each one counts). At the 2014 EU elections, PNȚCD's motto was Renaștem pentru România ta! (Reborn for your Romania!).

== Ideology ==
The PNȚCD is an agrarian, Christian democratic, and Christian humanist political party that stands for "social justice, Christian morality and enlightened patriotism." The party is anti-communist and advocates for de-Sovietization within Romania. It endorses the Universal Declaration of Human Rights in conjunction with the Romanian constitution and seeks to protect the cultural and traditional rights of all Romanian people. It also advocates for equal opportunities for all Romanians, uphold rule of law, defends the right to private property ownership, and calls for economic reform to stimulate the Romanian economy.

Internationally, the party is a member of Centrist Democrat International (CDI) along with other Christian democratic and conservative movements and was affiliated with the European People's Party (EPP) in the European Parliament before joining the European Conservatives and Reformists (ECR) group.

== Electoral history ==
=== Legislative elections ===
Election	Chamber			Senate			Position	Aftermath
Election	Votes	%	Seats	Votes	%	Seats	Position	Aftermath
1990	351,357	2.56	12 / 395	348,637	2.50	1 / 119	4th	Opposition to FSN government (1990–1991)
1990	351,357	2.56	12 / 395	348,637	2.50	1 / 119	4th	Opposition to FSN-PNL-MER-PDAR government (1991–1992)
1992	2,117,144	19.46	41 / 341	2,210,722	20.16	21 / 143	2nd (as CDR)^{1}	Opposition to PDSR-PSM-PUNR-PRM government (1992–1996)
1996	3,692,321	30.17	81 / 343	3,772,084	30.70	25 / 143	1st (within CDR)^{2}	CDR-USD-UDMR government (1996–2000)
2000	546,135	5.04	0 / 345	575,706	5.29	0 / 140	6th (as CDR 2000)^{3}	Extra-parliamentary opposition to PDSR minority government (2000–2004)
2004	188,268	1.85	0 / 332	196,027	1.90	0 / 137	6th	Extra-parliamentary endorsement for DA-PUR-UDMR government (2004–2007)
2004	188,268	1.85	0 / 332	196,027	1.90	0 / 137	6th	Extra-parliamentary endorsement for PNL-UDMR minority government (2007–2008)
2008	did not compete^{4}		0 / 334	did not compete^{4}		1 / 137	3rd (on PNL's lists)	Opposition to PDL-PSD government (2008–2009)
2008	did not compete^{4}		0 / 334	did not compete^{4}		1 / 137	3rd (on PNL's lists)	Opposition to PDL-UNPR-UDMR government (2009–2012)
2008	did not compete^{4}		0 / 334	did not compete^{4}		1 / 137	3rd (on PNL's lists)	Opposition to USL government (2012)
2012	1,223,189	16.51	1 / 412	1,239,318	16.71	1 / 176	2nd (as ARD)^{5}	Opposition to USL government (2012–2014)
2012	1,223,189	16.51	1 / 412	1,239,318	16.71	1 / 176	2nd (as ARD)^{5}	Opposition to PSD-UNPR-UDMR-PC government (2014)
2012	1,223,189	16.51	1 / 412	1,239,318	16.71	1 / 176	2nd (as ARD)^{5}	Opposition to PSD-UNPR-ALDE government (2014–2015)
2012	1,223,189	16.51	1 / 412	1,239,318	16.71	1 / 176	2nd (as ARD)^{5}	Endorsing the technocratic Cioloș Cabinet (2015–2017)
2016	did not compete							Extra-parliamentary endorsement for PSD-ALDE government (2017–2019)
2016	did not compete							Extra-parliamentary endorsement for PSD minority government (2019)
2016	did not compete							Extra-parliamentary opposition to PNL minority government (2019–2020)
2020	did not compete							Extra-parliamentary opposition to PNL-USR PLUS-UDMR government (2020–2021)
2020	did not compete							Extra-parliamentary opposition to PNL-UDMR minority government (2021)
2020	did not compete							Extra-parliamentary opposition to CNR government (2021–2024)
2024	did not compete							Extra-parliamentary opposition to PSD-PNL-UDMR government (2024–2025)

Notes:

^{1} CDR members in 1992: PNȚCD, PAC (7 senators and 13 deputies), PNL-AT (1 senator and 11 deputies), PSDR (1 senator and 10 deputies), PNL-CD (4 senators and 3 deputies), and PER (no senators and 4 deputies).
^{2} CDR members in 1996: PNȚCD, PNL (22 senators and 28 deputies), PNL-CD (1 senator and 4 deputies), PAR (3 senators and 3 deputies), PER (1 senator and 5 deputies), and Ecologist Federation of Romania (FER – 1 senator and 1 deputy).
^{3} CDR 2000 members: PNȚCD, UFD, Ecologist Federation of Romania (FER), National Christian Democratic Alliance (ANCD), and The Moldavians' Party (PM).
^{4} PNȚCD competed on PNL lists.
^{5} Right Romania Alliance (ARD) members: PDL (22 senators and 52 deputies), FC (1 senator and 3 deputies), and PNȚCD.

=== Presidential elections ===
Election	Candidate	First round			Second round		
Election	Candidate	Votes	Percentage	Position	Votes	Percentage	Position
1990	Ion Rațiu	617,007	4.3%	3rd			
1992	Emil Constantinescu^{1}	3,717,006	31.1%	2nd	4,641,207	38.6%	2nd
1996	Emil Constantinescu^{1}	3,569,941	28.2%	2nd	7,057,906	54.4%	1st
2000	Mugur Isărescu^{2}	1,069,463	9.5%	4th			
2004	Gheorghe Ciuhandu	198,394	1.9%	5th			
2009	Traian Băsescu^{3}	3,153,640	32.45%	1st	5,275,808	50.33%	1st
2014	Elena Udrea^{4}	493,376	5.2%	4th			
2019	Viorica Dăncilă^{5}	2,051,725	22.26%	2nd	3,339,922	33.91%	2nd
2024	Călin Georgescu^{6}	not endorsed			election annulled		
2025	George Simion^{7}	3,862,761	40.96%	1st	5,339,053	46.4%	2nd

Notes:

^{1} Emil Constantinescu was the common centre-right candidate who was endorsed by the PNȚCD in both 1992 and 1996 as part of the larger Romanian Democratic Convention (CDR).
^{2} Mugur Isărescu was endorsed by the PNȚCD in the 2000 elections as part of the Romanian Democratic Convention 2000 (CDR 2000) alliance.
^{3} PDL candidate endorsed by PNȚCD due to a decision enforced by the then official fraction of the PNȚCD led by Marian Petre Miluț.
^{4} Elena Udrea was endorsed by the People's Movement Party (PMP)-PNȚCD alliance in the 2014 Romanian presidential election.
^{5} PSD candidate endorsed by PNȚCD.
^{6} Independent candidate endorsed by PNȚCD in the second round, which was ultimately not held
^{7} AUR candidate endorsed by PNȚCD

=== European elections ===
Election	Votes	Percentage	MEPs	Position	EU Party	EP Group
2007	71,001	1.38%	0 / 35	11th	EPP	EPP Group
2009	70,428	1.45%	0 / 33	7th	EPP	EPP Group
2014	49,978	0.89%	0 / 32	12th	EPP	EPP Group
2019	did not compete^{1}					
2024	did not compete					

Notes:

^{1} Electoral protocol endorsing the Social Democratic Party (PSD).

== Presidents of the party ==
Also served as Prime Minister
Also served as Chamber President

Nº	Name Born – Died	Portrait	Term start	Term end	Duration
1	Corneliu Coposu (1914–1995)		1990	1995	c. 5 years
2	Ion Diaconescu (1917–2011)		1995	2001	c. 6 years
–	Constantin Dudu Ionescu (acting/ad interim) (1954–		2001	2001	less than 1 year
3	Andrei Marga (1946–		2002	2002	less than 1 year
4	Victor Ciorbea (1954–		2002	2004	c. 2 years
5	Gheorghe Ciuhandu (1947–		2004	2007	c. 3 years
6	Marian Petre Miluț (1955–		2007	2011	c. 4 years
7	Aurelian Pavelescu (1964–		2011	Incumbent	c. 11 years

== Notable members ==
- Corneliu Coposu
- Ion Diaconescu
- Constantin Ticu Dumitrescu
- Ioan Alexandru
- Ion Rațiu
- Ion Caramitru
- Victor Ciorbea
- Gheorghe Ciuhandu
- Marian Petre Miluț
- Matei Boilă
- Radu Vasile
- Aurelian Pavelescu
- Leonida Lari
- Marian Munteanu
- Mircea Ciumara
