= PSDR =

PSDR may refer to the Romanian-language initials of:

- Social Democratic Party of Romania (1910–18)
- Romanian Social Democratic Party (1927–48)
- Romanian Social Democratic Party (1990–2001)
