= Ion Gonțea =

Romanian politician

Ion Gonțea (born 14 November 1951) is a Romanian politician who was the Mayor of Brașov and a member of the Chamber of Deputies of Romania.

Between 1991 and 1992, he was the Mayor of Brașov, between 1992 and 1996, he was the President of the Brașov County Council. He later worked as legal adviser for Tractorul UTB factory and since 1998, he is a public notary. In 2004, he was elected a member of the Chamber of Deputies on a Democratic Party ticket. In 2008, he became a member of the Brașov County Council and between 2009 and 2012, he was the prefect of Brașov County.

In 2006, following an investigation of DIICOT, he was charged for aiding and abetting through the use of false documents, but he was found not guilty.
