= Partidul Democrat =

Partidul Democrat may refer to the following political parties:

- Democratic Party (Romania)
- Democratic Party of Moldova
