= Democratic Party (Romania) =

Democratic Party Partidul Democrat
- Abbreviation: PD-FSN (1993–2000); PD (2000–2007)
- President: Petre Roman (1993–2001); Traian Băsescu (2001–04); Emil Boc (2004–07)
- Founder: Petre Roman
- Founded: 28 May 1993
- Dissolved: 15 December 2007
- Preceded by: National Salvation Front
- Merged into: Democratic Liberal Party
- Ideology: Liberal conservatism; Neoliberalism; Christian democracy; Populism; Historically: Social democracy
- Political position: Centre-right; Historically: Centre-left
- National affiliation: Social Democratic Union (1995–2000); Justice and Truth Alliance (2003–07)
- European affiliation: Party of European Socialists (1996–2005); European People's Party (2005–2007)
- International affiliation: Socialist International (1996–2005); Centrist Democrat International (2005-2007)

Website
- pd.ro (Archived)

The Democratic Party (Romanian: Partidul Democrat, PD; also known as Partidul Democrat-Frontul Salvării Naționale or PD-FSN for short) was a social democratic and, later on, liberal conservative political party in Romania. In January 2008, it merged with the Liberal Democratic Party (PLD), a splinter group of the National Liberal Party (PNL), to form the Democratic Liberal Party (PDL).

From 1996 to 2005, the party was a member of the Socialist International (SI). Its official name was Democratic Party - National Salvation Front until 2000, when it officially shortened its name only to the Democratic Party. From 2004 to 2007, the PD was the junior member of the governing Justice and Truth Alliance (DA), although according to many Romanian opinion polls of the time, it remained the most popular of the two parties. Although it had to formally suspend his leadership to the party when elected president in 2004, the PD was largely associated with former Romanian president Traian Băsescu.

== History ==
In early 1992, conflict broke out between FSN leaders Ion Iliescu and Petre Roman and this led to the separation of the Iliescu wing under the name of the Democratic National Salvation Front (FDSN), which later became the Party of Social Democracy in Romania (PDSR) and then eventually the Social Democratic Party (PSD).

FSN was defeated by the FDSN in the 1992 general election and consequently spent the next four years in opposition. In 1993, the FSN changed its name to the Democratic Party (PD). In the 1996 general election, the PD jointly ran with the now-defunct Romanian Social Democratic Party (PSDR), under the Social Democratic Union (USD) banner. After having ranked third, they joined a governing coalition with the Romanian Democratic Convention (CDR) and the ethnic Hungarian party Democratic Alliance of Hungarians in Romania (UDMR/RMDSZ). From 2000 to 2004, PD has been again in opposition. It also began to move from social democracy to conservatism and Christian democracy. When PDSR and PSDR merged in 2001 to form the Social Democratic Party (PSD), PD was invited by both Adrian Năstase and Alexandru Athanasiu to join the new PSD, but PD president Traian Băsescu refused to take part in the merger. In May 2002, the PD absorbed part of the local Socialist Party of National Renaissance subsidiaries (a left-wing nationalist splinter of the Greater Romania Party).

In advance of the 2004 elections, the PD joined forces with the National Liberal Party (PNL) to create the Justice and Truth Alliance (DA), whose main purpose was to fight the all-dominating PSD. The DA managed to win around 32% of the votes in both Chambers, not enough for a majority and about 6% less than the PSD. Together with its liberal allies, the UDMR/RMDSZ, and the Conservative Party (PC), the PD was part of the governing coalition until April 2007.

During a congress in 2005, PD members voted in favor of joining the European People's Party (EPP) and abandoning the Party of European Socialists (PES) and the Socialist International (SI). In the same year, Petre Roman left the party and, together with his followers, formed the Democratic Force (FD).

From mid-2005, the PD's relations with the PNL became strained due to an ongoing open conflict between former President Băsescu and then Prime Minister Călin Popescu-Tăriceanu, who was also the chairman of the PNL. Previously, after his presidential victory in 2004, Băsescu appointed Popescu-Tăriceanu as Prime Minister. Although he wanted to, he could not constitutionally dismiss him; at least, it took him a while to do so. On 1 April 2007, Tăriceanu dismissed the ministers of the PD and formed a minority government.

On 15 December 2007, the PD merged with the Liberal Democratic Party (PLD) to form the Democratic Liberal Party (PDL).

== Ideology and policies ==
Under the leadership of Petre Roman, the PD represented the reformist social democratic wing resulting from the split of the FSN in 1992. Despite the clear ideological positioning, several observers did not notice substantial programmatic differences between the documents presented by the reformist and left-wing conservative currents that confronted each other during the national conference of the FSN in March 1992. In the following years, the PD ran against Iliescu's group, represented by the FDSN, PDSR and PSD parties, to win the same type of electorate linked to the centre-left. Petre Roman's party was, however, distinguished by the stance of its president, who stressed his supposed attachment to a true social democracy, far removed from the influences of proletarian socialism inherited from Communist dictatorship. Although it approached the centre-right forces, with which it formed a coalition government between 1996 and 2000, the party continued to share some of its objectives with the centre-left parties that were in opposition. As the direct successor of the FSN, the PD borrowed both its symbol, a rose, and its identifying colour, blue.

After the PD joined the Socialist International in 1996, it continued to maintain the social democratic outlook even after the election of Traian Băsescu as president, who was elected head of the party in 2001 with the motion «Strong Romania - Social democratic Romania». The party made clear that its policy should be oriented towards the needs of the people, supporting a competitive socio-economic framework but focusing on social protection and security of citizens.

After Băsescu took over the leadership of the Democratic Party, it successfully used anti-communist, anti-corruption, anti-PDSR and pro-European populist rhetoric and strategies. While Petre Roman wanted a conditional cooperation with the ruling Social Democracy Party of Romania (PDSR), Băsescu opted for a total, uncompromising opposition to the PDSR and its successor, the Social Democratic Party (PSD), despite the fact that both had, nominally, the same political ideology.

After 2003, a new approach to the centre-right, with the birth of an alliance with the PNL, contributed to a decisive change in its doctrinal orientation. In the 2004 elections, Traian Băsescu's pro-European and anti-corruption message reached mainly young people and residents of the urban areas and the north-west of the country, an electorate traditionally linked to the centre-right. Favored by Băsescu and the new president Emil Boc, the shift to the centre-right was officially realized in 2005, with the adoption of a political program explicitly based on popular and conservative doctrine.

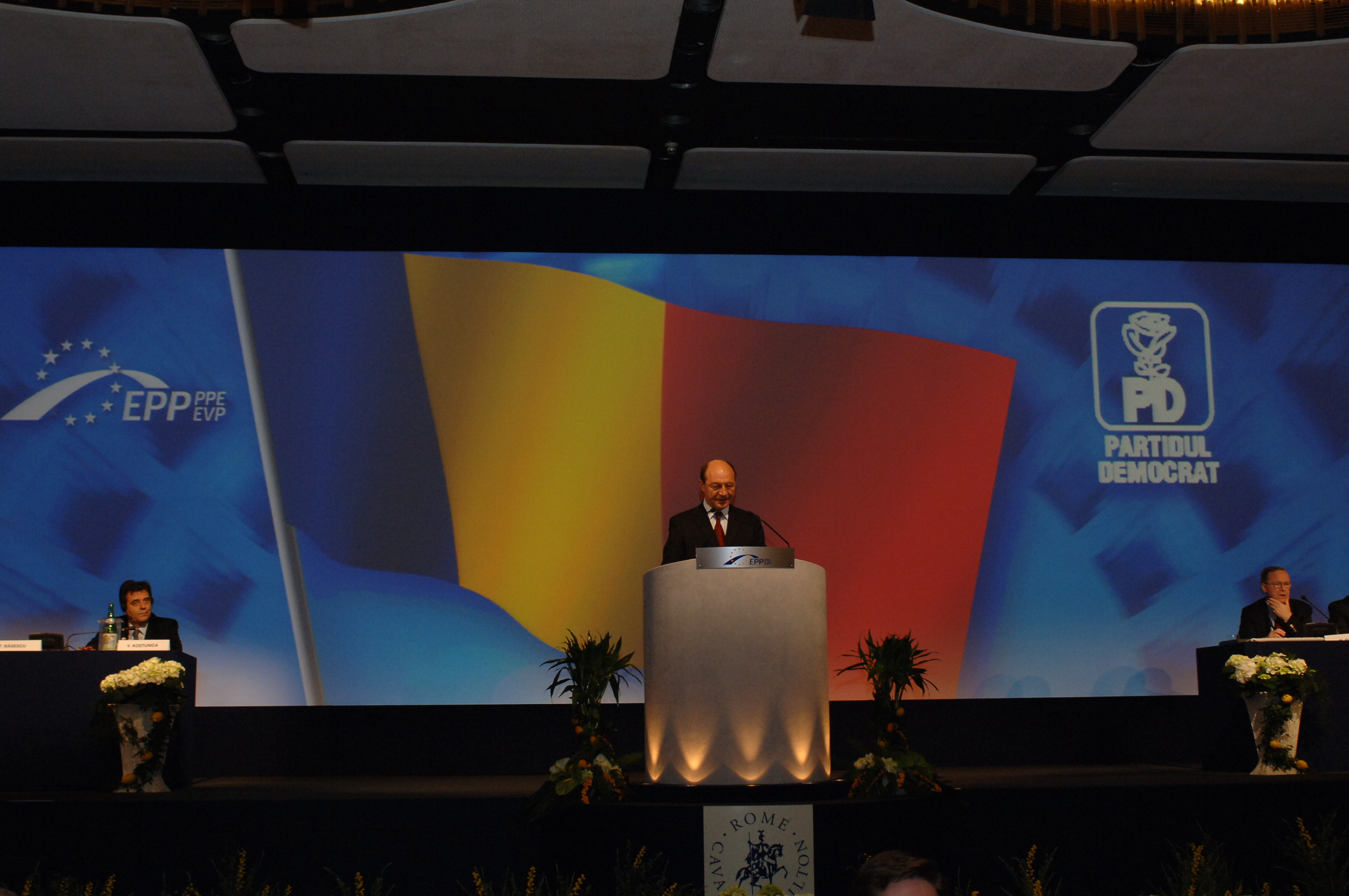
Băsescu at the 2006 EPP Congress, after PD joined the party

The political doctrine of the Democratic Party (PD) shifted from social democracy to social conservatism in 2005. The party supported the consolidation of the free market and is supportive of Romania's flat tax rate of 16%. The party also supported reforming the Romanian Constitution in order to bring about decentralization in administration and give greater power to the eight development regions.

In terms of European politics, the Democratic Party (PD):

- Supported EU enlargement to the Western Balkans;
- Supported EU membership for Turkey, as long as it satisfied membership criteria;
- Supported the accession of the Republic of Moldova to the EU;
- Supported the Treaty of Lisbon;
- Believed that the European Parliament should have greater power;
- Opposed a reform of the Common Agricultural Policy;
- Supported a common EU migration policy;
- Supported a common EU defence and security policy;
- Supported a partnership between the US and the EU, where the EU is an "equal and critical" partner.

The motion that allowed the appointment of Boc, «Prosperous Romania, democratic Romania» («România prosperă, România democrată») was approved by 3,553 votes to 114 and provided for an important ideological reorientation, by adhering to the Christian-democratic popular doctrine at the expense of the social democratic one, officially transforming the party into a centre-right formation, a choice which according to Boc reflected the political lines adopted by the PD in previous years. The party group which would have preferred to continue to uphold the social democratic ideology, represented by vice-presidents Cezar Preda and Radu Berceanu, was unable to present any candidacy for the presidency, as it was not supported by at least ten branches, as provided for in the Statutes.

As Boc pointed out, the document was based on the recognition of the need for a market economy and support for social justice principles. According to his statements, the new programme was designed to adapt the official ideological positioning to the political line of action pursued by the PD in the years following the election of Băsescu. According to Boc, the text included 80% of the document «Strong Romania forte - Social democratic Romania». In 2007 the PD self-defined itself as a «centrist-republican party, with a modern European doctrine whose principles are: an efficient, humane and supportive market economy, modern and quality public services, extensive, active and precise social protection in accordance with an independent justice, accessible and safe». Adherence to popular doctrine led to the adoption of orange, borrowed from the EPP, as the official colour alongside blue. The Democratic Party also started to endorse neoliberal economic policies.

According to some analysts, the new ideological orientation was also determined by political dynamics at European level. In 2005 the Party of European Socialists refused to recognize the PD as a full member, but admitted the PSD instead. The refusal, accompanied by an attitude of the PES aimed at favouring the PSD also in internal political matters, had led the PD to turn to the European People's Party which, on the other hand, needed new members to strengthen its political position in the European Parliament as opposed to the socialists. Beyond the ideological repositioning, after 2004 the PD was above all a pragmatic party and an expression of Băsescu's presidential policy.

== Leadership of the PD ==
Also served as Prime Minister
Also served as President

Nº	Name Born - Died	Portrait	Term start	Term end	Duration
1	Petre Roman^{1} (1946–)		28 May 1993	19 May 2001	7 years, 11 months and 21 days
2	Traian Băsescu (1951–)		19 May 2001	18 December 2004	3 years, 6 months and 29 days
3	Emil Boc (1966–)		20 December 2004	15 December 2007	2 years, 11 months and 25 days

^{1} Roman also served as Senate President between 27 November 1996 and 22 December 1999.

== Notable former members ==
- Petre Roman – subsequently left and founded the Democratic Force (FD) party;
- Traian Băsescu – elected President of Romania, membership suspended during the first mandate;
- Emil Boc – Mayor of Cluj-Napoca 2004–2008; 2012–present, former Prime Minister between 2008 and 2012;
- Adriean Videanu – Vice-president of PDL, former mayor of Bucharest between 2005 and 2008;
- Radu Berceanu – Senator, former Minister of Transportation, Constructions, and Tourism;
- Cristian Rădulescu, MP, PD Leader in the Chamber of Deputies;
- Gheorghe Albu, MP;
- Roberta Anastase, MP;
- Petru Filip, MEP, former mayor of the municipality of Oradea;
- Ioan Olteanu, MP;
- Cezar Preda, MP;
- Păunel Tișe;
- Alexandru Sassu (subsequently switched to PSD);
- Bogdan Niculescu Duvăz (left for PSD together with Sassu);
- Daniel Buda;
- Victor Babiuc, formerly in charge of the Ministry of Defence (currently a member of the National Liberal Party – PNL);
- Radu Vasile, former Prime Minister of Romania (came from the Christian Democratic National Peasants' Party – PNȚCD);
- Anca Boagiu, former minister of European Integration and of Transport;
- Vasile Blaga, former Minister of Administration and Interior, former President of the Senate of Romania;
- Cristian Ilie, MP;
- Nati Meir, a member from June 2007;
- Nicolae Ștefănuță, head of PD/PD-L's Department of European Politics and Affairs.

In 2007, out of 54 members of the PD group in Chamber of Deputies, 14 were not elected on PD electoral list:

- 7 came from Greater Romania Party (William Gabriel Brânză, Bogdan Catargiu, Alexandru Ciocâlteu, Dan Grigore, Dănuț Liga, Nati Meir, Dumitru Puzdrea);
- 4 came from Social Democratic Party (Constantin Amarie, Obuf Cătălin Ovidiu Buhăianu, Gheorghe Sârb, Mugurel Liviu Sârbu);
- 3 came from Conservative Party (Dumitru Becșenescu, Grațiela Denisa Iordache, Constantin Tudor).

== Electoral history ==
=== Legislative elections ===
Election	Chamber			Senate			Position	Aftermath
Election	Votes	%	Seats	Votes	%	Seats	Position	Aftermath
1996	1,582,231	12.93	43 / 343	1,617,384	13.16	22 / 143	3rd (within USD)^{1}	CDR–USD–UDMR government (1996–2000)
2000	762,365	7.03	31 / 345	825,437	7.58	13 / 140	3rd	Opposition to PDSR minority government (2000–2004)
2004	3,191,546	31.3	48 / 332	3,250,663	31.1	21 / 137	2nd (within DA)^{2}	DA–PUR–UDMR government (2004–2007)
2004	3,191,546	31.3	48 / 332	3,250,663	31.1	21 / 137	2nd (within DA)^{2}	Opposition to PNL–UDMR minority government (2007–2008)

Notes

- ^{1}USD members: PD and PSDR (1 senator and 10 deputies).
- ^{2}Justice and Truth Alliance members: PNL (28 senators and 64 deputies) and PD.

=== Presidential elections ===
Election	Candidate	First round			Second round		
Election	Candidate	Votes	%	Result	Votes	%	Result
2000	Petre Roman	334,852	3.0%	6th			
2004	Traian Băsescu^{1}	3,545,236	33.9%	2nd	5,126,794	51.2%	1st

Notes

- ^{1}Traian Băsescu was endorsed by the Justice and Truth Alliance (DA); alliance members: PNL and PD.

=== European elections ===
Election	Votes	Percentage	MEPs	Position	Political group
2007	1,476,105	28.8	13 / 35	1st	European People's Party (EPP)

== Bibliography ==
- Ioan, Scurtu ș.a., "Enciclopedia partidelor politice din România 1859–2003", Editura Meronia, București, 2003.
- Florin-Vasile, Șomlea, "Partidele populare din țările Uniunii Europene", Editura Cartimpex, Cluj-Napoca, 2007.
