= Social Democratic Union (Romania) =

Romanian electoral alliance

Social Democratic Union Uniunea Social-Democrată
- Abbreviation: USD
- Leader: Petre Roman (PD); Sergiu Cunescu (PSDR)
- Founded: 1995
- Dissolved: 1999
- Ideology: Social democracy Social liberalism Pro-Europeanism
- Political position: Center-left
- European affiliation: Party of European Socialists
- International affiliation: Socialist International

The Social Democratic Union (Romanian: Uniunea Social-Democrată, USD) was an electoral alliance established on 27 September 1995 between the Democratic Party (PD) and the Romanian Social Democratic Party (PSDR). The alliance was formed to participate in the 1996 Romanian general election.

The alliance formally ended in 1999, when the Romanian Social Democratic Party left it, in order to join the Social Democratic Pole of Romania.

== Composition ==
Party	Abbr.	Ideology	From	To
Democratic Party - National Salvation Front	PD-FSN	Social democracy Left-wing populism	1995	1999
Romanian Social Democratic Party	PSDR	Social democracy	1995	1999

== Electoral history ==
=== Legislative elections ===
Election	Chamber			Senate			Position	Aftermath
Election	Votes	%	Seats	Votes	%	Seats	Position	Aftermath
1996	1,582,231	12.93	53 / 343	1,617,384	13.16	23 / 143	3rd	CDR–USD–UDMR government (1996–2000)

=== Presidential elections ===
Election	Candidate	Votes	%	Position
1996	Petre Roman	2,598,545	20.5	3rd
