= Romanian Social Democratic Party (1990–2001) =

Romanian Social Democratic Party Partidul Social Democrat Român
- Abbreviation: PSDR
- Leader: Sergiu Cunescu
- Founded: January 1990
- Dissolved: 16 June 2001
- Preceded by: Independent Social Democratic Party (claimed)
- Merged into: Social Democratic Party (PSD)
- Ideology: Social democracy Pro-Europeanism; Anti-communism
- Political position: Centre-left
- National affiliation: Romanian Democratic Convention (1991–1995); Social Democratic Union (1995–2000); Social Democratic Pole of Romania (2000–2001)
- European affiliation: Party of European Socialists
- International affiliation: Socialist International (SI)
- Colours: Salmon

Website
- psdr.ro

The Romanian Social Democratic Party (Romanian: Partidul Social Democrat Român, PSDR) was a social democratic political party in Romania. Founded in 1990, shortly after the fall of the Communist party rule in Romania in December 1989, it claimed to be the direct successor of the historical Romanian Social Democratic Party (PSD) which existed between 1927 and 1948, until it merged with the Romanian Communist Party (PCR) to create the Romanian Workers' Party (PMR).

Joining the Socialist International (SI), the party entered alliances with the Democratic Party (PD; forming Uniunea Social-Democrată or the Social Democratic Union during the 1996 legislative election), and took part in the Romanian Democratic Convention (CDR) governments of Victor Ciorbea, Radu Vasile, and Mugur Isărescu (briefly leading the coalition government with Alexandru Athanasiu as acting/ad interim PM in 1999). The PSDR subsequently adhered to the Social Democratic Pole of Romania (PDSR) for the 2000 Romanian general election, and fused into the Social Democratic Party (PSD) on 16 January 2001.

A minority wing opposed to the merger survived as Partidul Social Democrat "Constantin Titel Petrescu", later reforming itself as the Social-Democratic Workers' Party, but was eventually dissolved in 2013.

== Notable members ==
- Alexandru Athanasiu;
- Sergiu Cunescu;
- Adrian Dimitriu;
- Georgiu Gingăraş.

== Electoral history ==
=== Legislative elections ===
Election	Chamber			Senate			Position	Aftermath
Election	Votes	%	Seats	Votes	%	Seats	Position	Aftermath
1990	73,014	0.53	2 / 395	69,762	0.50	0 / 119	10th	Opposition to FSN government (1990–1991)
1990	73,014	0.53	2 / 395	69,762	0.50	0 / 119	10th	Opposition to FSN–PNL–MER–PDAR government (1991–1992)
1992	Part of CDR		10 / 341	Part of CDR		1 / 143	–	Opposition to PDSR-PUNR-PRM government (1992–1996)
1996	Part of USD		10 / 343	Part of USD		1 / 143	–	CDR-USD-UDMR government (1996–2000)
2000	Part of PDSR		10 / 345	Part of PDSR		2 / 140	–	PDSR minority government (2000–2001)^{4}

Notes:

^{1} The CDR members in 1992 were the following ones: the PNȚ-CD (with 21 senators and 41 deputies), the PAC (with 7 senators and 13 deputies), the PNL-AT (with 1 senator and 11 deputies), the PSDR, the PNL-CD (with 4 senators and 3 deputies), and the PER (with no senators and 4 deputies).

^{2} The members of the USD were the PD (with 22 senators and 43 deputies) and the PSDR.

^{3} The members of the Social Democratic Pole of Romania (PDSR) were the following ones: the PDSR (with 59 senators and 139 deputies), the PSDR, and the PUR (with 4 senators and 6 deputies).

^{4} The PSDR merged with the Party of Social Democracy in Romania (PDSR) in 2001.

=== Presidential elections ===
Election	Candidate	First round			Second round		
Election	Candidate	Votes	Percentage	Position	Votes	Percentage	Position
1990	Did not compete						
1992	Emil Constantinescu^{1}	3,717,006	31.1	2nd	4,641,207	38.6	2nd
1996	Petre Roman^{2}	2,598,545	20.5	3rd			
2000	Ion Iliescu^{3}	4,076,273	36.4	1st	6,696,623	66.8	1st

Notes:

^{1} Emil Constantinescu was the common centre-right presidential candidate who was endorsed by the PSDR in 1992, as part of the CDR.

^{2} Petre Roman was the presidential candidate of the center-left alliance Social Democratic Union (USD).

^{3} Ion Iliescu was the presidential candidate of the alliance Social Democratic Pole of Romania (the same acronym as the main party - PDSR).
