= Aurelian Pavelescu =

Romanian politician

President in the Christian Democratic National Peasants' Party
- Incumbent
- Assumed office 2011

Deputy of Romania
- In office 2004–2008

Personal details
- Born: 20 October 1964 (age 61) Lădești, Vâlcea County, Romania
- Party: PNȚCD

Aurelian Pavelescu (born 20 October 1964) is a Romanian politician. He has been serving as the president of the Christian Democratic National Peasants' Party (PNȚCD) since 2011 onwards. Previously, he had also served as a member of the Chamber of Deputies from 2004 to 2008.
