= Sergiu Cunescu =

Romanian politician

Member of the Chamber of Deputies of Romania
- In office June 18, 1990 – November 2000

Personal details
- Born: March 16, 1923 Bucharest, Kingdom of Romania
- Died: 16 March 2005 (aged 82) Bucharest, Romania
- Resting place: Bellu Cemetery, Bucharest
- Party: Social Democratic Party (PSDR)
- Education: Politehnica University of Bucharest
- Occupation: Engineer; Politician

Sergiu Cunescu (March 16, 1923—March 16, 2005) was a Romanian social democratic politician, the leader of the Social Democratic Party of Romania (PSDR) between 1990 and 2001.

== Biography ==
Born in Bucharest, he graduated from the Electromagnetics branch of the Polytechnic Institute. Although his father was a prominent PSDR member, Sergiu Cunescu was initially sympathetic of the National Peasants' Party (PNȚ), and led the latter party's Polytechnic group for a period. For a while after 1948, he was a political prisoner in Communist Romania, before being allowed to return to his engineering career.

In January 1990, soon after the Romanian Revolution, Cunescu was instrumental in the recreation of the PSDR as an independent group (it had been absorbed into the Romanian Communist Party in November 1947). He was elected to the Chamber of Deputies (Romania) in 1990, 1992 and 1996, and was a member of the Joint Romania-European Union Parliamentary Committee, and later of the Chamber's External Policies and European Integration Committee - under the PSDR-backed Romanian Democratic Convention (CDR) governments.

He retreated from public life after the subsequent union of the PSDR with the Romanian Party of Social Democracy (PDSR), which he had voted against.

== Political activity ==
In January 1990, together with Adrian Dimitriu (the former secretary general of the Independent Social Democratic Party) chaired by Constantin Titel Petrescu), Mira Moscovici, Constantin Avramescu, Mircea Iscru Stanescu (the veterans of the old party active in 1946) they established the new PSDR party. The PSDR claimed to be the legitimate and unique successor of the Independent Social Democratic Party (PSDI) and, together with the Christian Democratic National Peasants' Party (PNȚ-CD) and National Liberal Party (PNL), parties established in 1990 also claiming the legacy of pre-1948 parties, formed the political opposition against the ruling National Salvation Front (FSN).

In 1990–2000, Cunescu was the chairperson of the PSDR. In 1992 and in 1996, he was re-elected within the Congresses. In 1990–2000, he was a member of the Romanian Parliament, being a parliamentary group leader. In 2000, at the party's Congress, which by that time had merged with the Socialist Party led by Tudor Mohora, Alexandru Athanasiu was elected as an executive chairperson, and Sergiu Cunescu became the honorary chairperson of the party. In 2000, he resigned from the position and left the party. His resignation came shortly after merging by absorption of PSDR by PDSR, the former FSN, which became the Social Democratic Party (PSD).

Cunescu succeeded to join the PSDR to the Socialist International. Initially an observer party and afterwards with the a consultative role, the party eventually became a full-fledged member. Sergiu Cunescu was a supporter of modern social democracy, of the Franco-German origin, mastering Bad Godesberg’s reformist theses, who delineated the European left-wing movement of Marxism. Among his most important comrades were Radu Dimitrescu, Constantin Avramescu (until 1997), Smaranda Dobrescu, etc.

On 16 March 2005, Cunescu died, at age 82. In 2006, in memory of his conceptions, democratic principles and social solidarity the book “Social Democracy, Illusion and Reality” by Smaranda Dobrescu was published by Niculescu Publishing House. He is buried in the Cunescu family's cave at the Orthodox Bellu Cemetery.
