= Cristian Ilie =

Romanian politician (born 1964)

Cristian Ilie (born 19 June 1964 in Craiova, Romania) is a Romanian politician and former member of the Romanian Chamber of Deputies.

In 2014, he ran for the Romanian Senate in the Sector 4 of Bucharest, representing the People's Movement Party (PMP). Previously member of the Democratic Party (PD), part of the European People's Party–European Democrats, and MP from March 2007, until December 2008.

He was member of the Committee for Defence Public Order, and National Security, of the Committee for Information Technologies and Communications and also member of the Delegation to the NATO Parliamentary Assembly.
