= Ion Diaconescu =

Romanian politician (1914–2011)

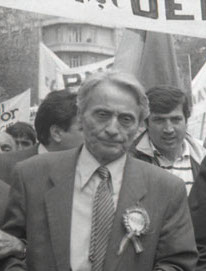
- Ion Diaconescu in 1990

Leader of the Christian Democratic National Peasants' Party
- In office 11 November 1995 – 2000
- Preceded by: Corneliu Coposu
- Succeeded by: Constantin Dudu Ionescu

President of the Chamber of Deputies
- In office 27 November 1996 – 30 November 2000
- President: Emil Constantinescu
- Preceded by: Adrian Năstase
- Succeeded by: Valer Dorneanu

Member of the Chamber of Deputies
- In office 18 June 1990 – 10 December 2000
- Constituency: Bucharest

Personal details
- Born: 25 July 1917 Boțești, Dâmbovița County, Kingdom of Romania
- Died: 11 October 2011 (aged 94) Bucharest, Romania
- Resting place: Bellu Cemetery, Bucharest
- Party: National Peasants' Party (1936–1947); Christian Democratic National Peasants' Party (1989–2011)
- Education: Politehnica University of Bucharest

Ion Diaconescu (Romanian pronunciation: [iˈon di.akoˈnesku]; 25 August 1917 – 11 October 2011) was a Romanian anti-communist activist and politician. He was imprisoned as a political prisoner for seventeen years from 1947 to 1964 during Romania's Communist era. Diaconescu later became a leader of the Christian Democratic National Peasants' Party (PNȚCD).

Born in Boțești, Argeș County, Diaconescu began his political career in 1936, when he joined the Peasants' Party (PNȚ) youth wing. The Communist Party took power in Romania in 1945 near the end of World War II. Diaconescu was arrested in 1947, but survived his imprisonment in the Romanian gulag. Romanian authorities released him in 1964 after seventeen years in prison as party of an amnesty program for political prisoners.

Romanian dictator, President Nicolae Ceaușescu, and the Communist government fell in the Romanian Revolution of 1989. Diaconescu co-founded the Christian Democratic National Peasants' Party (PNȚCD) in 1989, just after the revolution.

Diaconescu served as the Speaker of the Chamber of Deputies, the lower house of the Romanian Parliament, from 1996 to 2000. In 2011, Diaconescu criticized his own Christian Democratic National Peasants' Party (PNȚCD), which has been plagued by in-fighting, saying that the party should be relaunched under the leadership of former Prime Minister, Victor Ciorbea.

Diaconescu died in Bucharest in 2011, at the age of 94. He had suffered from heart ailments during his later years. His burial took place in Bucharest at the Bellu Cemetery. A moment of silence was held in the Parliament of Romania in his honor. He received praise from many Romania's politicians and activists. Former Romanian President Emil Constantinescu called Diaconescu, "a symbol of communist resistance in Romania and Eastern Europe, and a symbol of honesty and honor." Former Romanian Prime Minister Victor Ciorbea paid tribute to Diaconescu saying, "Ion Diaconescu understood that faith and principles are national treasures, and he didn’t betray these (values), enduring 17 years in communist prisons." One of Romania's best known political activists, Doina Cornea, also praised Diaconescu's life and career, "Today’s politicians only think about their own interests. ... That is why Romania is crawling along."
