= Alexandru Athanasiu =

Romanian politician and jurist

Prime Minister of Romania (acting)
- In office 13 December 1999 – 22 December 1999
- President: Emil Constantinescu
- Preceded by: Radu Vasile
- Succeeded by: Mugur Isărescu

Personal details
- Born: 1 January 1955 (age 71) Bucharest, Romania
- Party: Social Democratic Party (2001–present)
- Other political affiliations: Romanian Social Democratic Party (1996–2001); Civic Alliance Party (1991–1996)
- Education: University of Bucharest
- Profession: Jurist

Alexandru Athanasiu (Note: Romanian pronunciation: [alekˈsandru atanaˈsi.u]) (born 1 January 1955) is a Romanian politician and jurist. A former leader of the Romanian Social Democratic Party (PSDR), he has been a member of the Social Democratic Party (PSD) since 2001.

Athanasiu previously served as Prime Minister on an ad interim basis for 9 days between 13 December and 22 December 1999, heading the Romanian Democratic Convention (CDR) cabinet after the resignation of Radu Vasile (PNȚCD. On 1 January 2007, with the accession of Romania to the European Union, Athanasiu became a Member of the European Parliament for the PSD (inside the Party of European Socialists).

An author of several scientific works, he is the recipient of a PhD in Law, as well as a professor at the University of Bucharest (since 1999). In 1995, his volume Legea Asigurărilor Sociale ("The Law on Social Security") received the Romanian Academy's Simion Bărnuțiu Award.

== Biography ==
Born in Bucharest, Athanasiu studied at the Gheorghe Lazăr High School in Bucharest, and later graduated from the law school at the Bucharest University. Between 1978 and 1982, he was employed by the Bucharest Court of Appeal.

Having joined the newly created PSDR after the Romanian Revolution of 1989, Athanasiu was first elected to Parliament as a deputy in 1992, being nominated to the Committee for Labor and Social Protection.

A Minister of Labor in the Victor Ciorbea CDR cabinet, he retained the office under Radu Vasile and his own premiership, being replaced by Smaranda Dobrescu during the leadership of Mugur Isărescu. In 1999, he replaced Sergiu Cunescu at the head of the PSDR, leading it into fusion with Adrian Năstase's Party of Social Democracy, PDSR (the fusion led to the creation of the PSD).

In 2000, he was elected to the Romanian Senate on PSDR lists, representing Bihor County (re-elected in 2004 on PSD lists); he stood on the Committee for Foreign Policies. In 2003–2004, Athanasiu also served as Minister of Education in the Adrian Năstase executive (replacing Ecaterina Andronescu).

Athanasiu is married with two children.

Political offices
Preceded by Radu Vasile	Prime Minister of Romania; Acting; 1999	Succeeded by Mugur Isărescu
