= Nati Meir =

Romanian politician

Nati Meir (born 23 May 1955) is a Romanian politician and member of the Chamber of Deputies from 2004 to 2008. He became a member of the Chamber of Deputies on the lists of the Greater Romania Party (PRM), but from April 2005 he was an independent member, after he was fired by the party's leader Corneliu Vadim Tudor. Tudor claimed it was because of allegations of bribery, but Meir claimed it was because of antisemitism. It turned out that the Romanian press discovered that Meir had been convicted in Israel of banking fraud and so was incompatible with the office of member of the Chamber of Deputies.
