= 2000 Romanian general election =

- Presidential election
- 26 November 2000 (first round); 10 December 2000 (second round)
- Turnout: 65.31% (first round) ▼10.70pp 57.50% (second round) ▼18.40pp
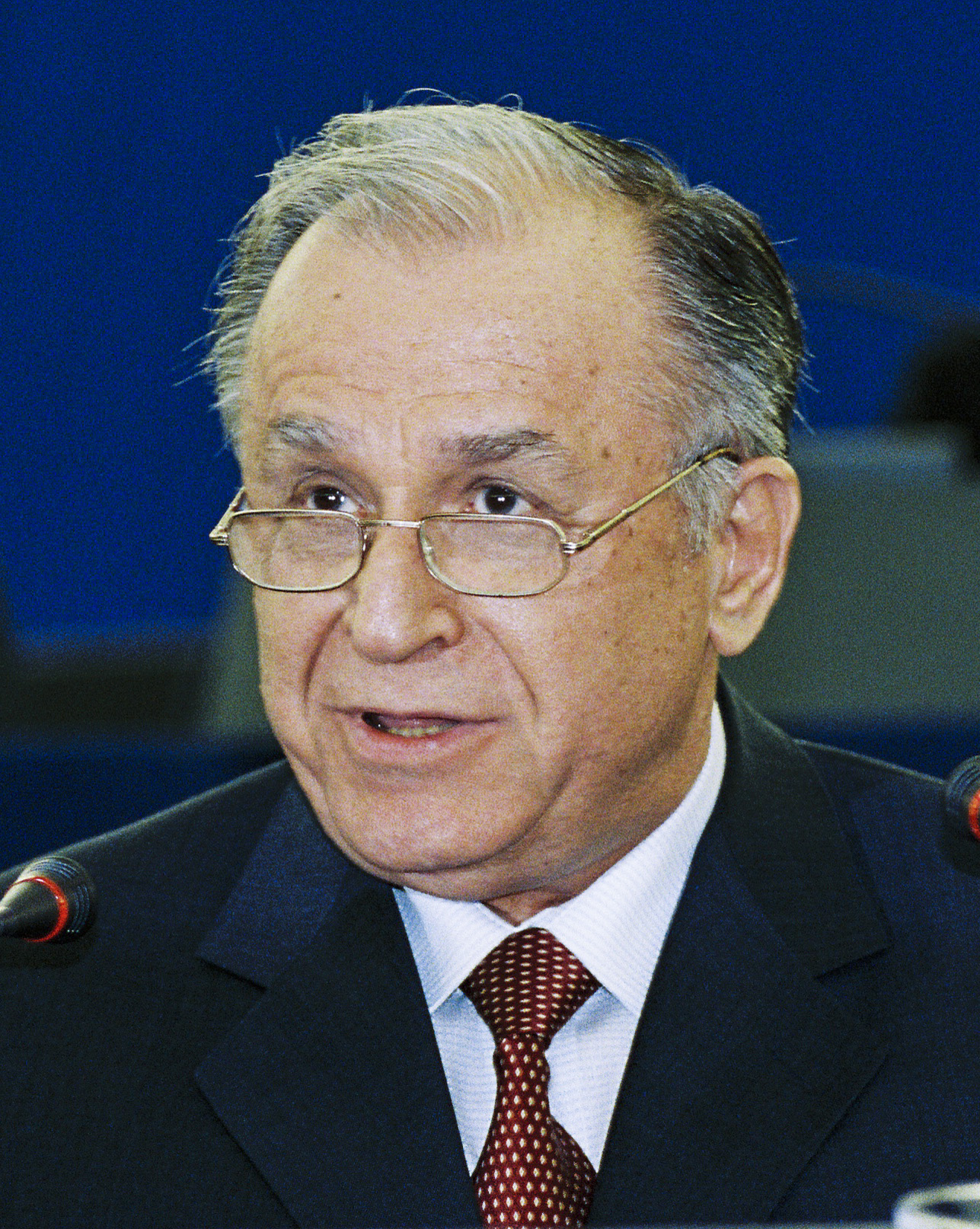

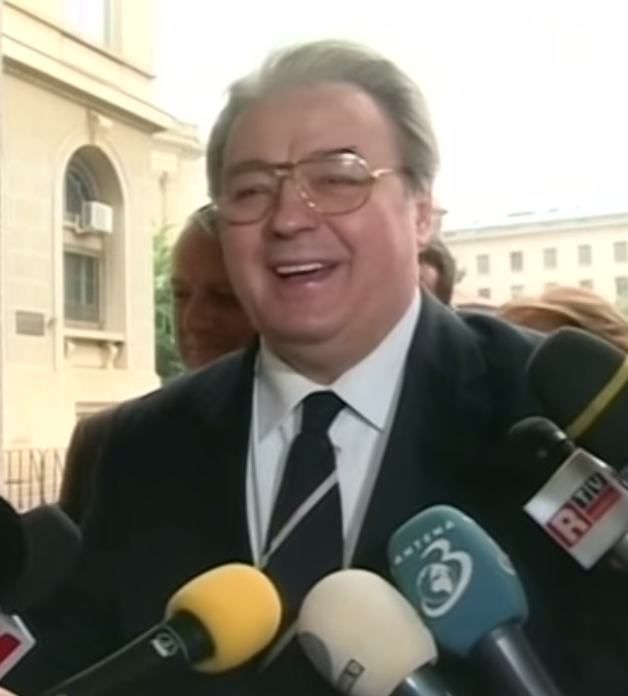
| Nominee | Ion Iliescu | Corneliu Vadim Tudor |
| Party | PSD | PRM |
| Alliance | PDSR |
| Popular vote | 6,696,623 | 3,324,247 |
| Percentage | 66.83% | 33.17% |

Iliescu:
30–40%
40–50%
50–60%
60–70%
70–80%
80–90%
>90%
Tudor:
20–30%
30–40%
40–50%
50–60%
Frunda:
30–40%
70–80%
80–90%
President before election
Emil Constantinescu
CDR
Elected President
Ion Iliescu
PDSR
- Chamber of Deputies
- 26 November 2000
- All 345 seats in the Chamber of Deputies
- Turnout: 65.31%
| Party | Leader | Vote % | Seats | +/– |
|---|---|---|---|---|
| PDSR | Ion Iliescu | 36.61 | 155 | +64 |
| PRM | Corneliu Vadim Tudor | 19.48 | 84 | +65 |
| PD | Petre Roman | 7.03 | 31 | −12 |
| PNL | Mircea Ionescu-Quintus | 6.89 | 30 | −3 |
| UDMR | Béla Markó | 6.80 | 27 | +2 |
| Minority parties | Varujan Pambuccian (Note: Pambuccian, a member of the Union of Armenians of Romania, has been the parliamentary leader of the national minorities' group since 1996.) | 2.57 | 18 | +3 |
This lists parties that won seats. See the complete results below.
- Senate
- 26 November 2000
- All 140 seats in the Senate
- Turnout: 65.31%
| Party | Leader | Vote % | Seats | +/– |
|---|---|---|---|---|
| PDSR | Ion Iliescu | 37.09 | 65 | +24 |
| PRM | Corneliu Vadim Tudor | 21.01 | 37 | +29 |
| PD | Petre Roman | 7.58 | 13 | −9 |
| PNL | Mircea Ionescu-Quintus | 7.48 | 13 | −11 |
| UDMR | Béla Markó | 6.90 | 12 | +1 |
This lists parties that won seats. See the complete results below.
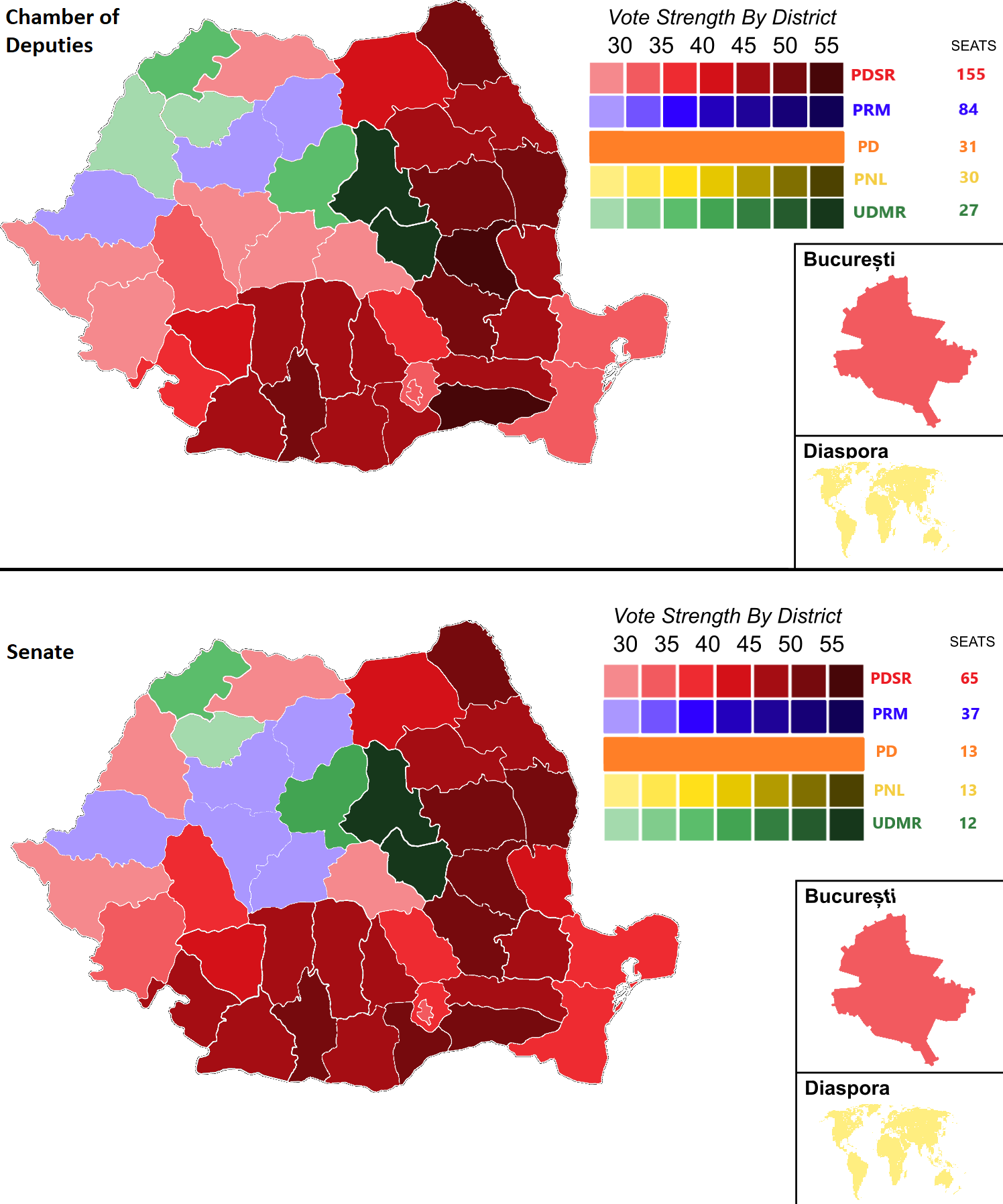
Results for the Chamber of Deputies and Senate
| Prime Minister before | Prime Minister-designate |
|---|---|
| Mugur Isărescu; Independent (Note: Isărescu could have also been perceived as a technocratic PM, yet somewhat affiliated with the CDR, officially only for the presidential campaign.) | Adrian Năstase; PDSR |

General elections were held in Romania on 26 November 2000, with a second round of the presidential election on 10 December. Former president Ion Iliescu of the Social Democracy Party of Romania (PDSR) was re-elected in the run-off, whilst the PDSR, as part of the Social Democratic Pole of Romania (PDSR), emerged as the largest party in Parliament, winning 155 of the 345 seats in the Chamber of Deputies and 65 of the 140 seats in the Senate. The 2000 Romanian presidential election was the fourth of its kind held in post-1989 Romania.

The election entailed a collapse for the CDR, a broad anticommunist coalition involving Liberals and Christian Democrats, which had won the 1996 election.

== Presidential candidates ==
| Name | Lifespan | Public administration experience | Affiliation and endorsements | Alma mater and profession |
|---|---|---|---|---|
| Ion Iliescu | Born: 3 March 1930 (age 70); Oltenița, Călărași County | Senator (1996–election day); President of Romania (1989–1996); President of Water Surfaces Management Council (1979–1984); Member of the State Council (full member: 1979–1980, observative: 1974–1979); President of Iași County Council (1974–1979); Vice-President of Timiș County Council (1971–1974); Minister of Youth (1967–1971); Deputy (1957–1961, 1965–1973, 1975–1985); Former presidential elections: 1996: 32.3% (1st place, 1st round), 45.6% (2nd place, 2nd round); 1992: 47.2% (1st place, 1st round), 61.4% (winner, 2nd round); 1990: 85.1% (winner) | Affiliation: PDSR; Alliance members: PDSR, PSDR, and PUR | Energy Institute, Moscow State University (1954) fluid mechanics engineer, publishing house manager |
| Corneliu Vadim Tudor | Born: 28 November 1949 (age 51); Bucharest; Died: 14 September 2015, Bucharest | Senator (1992–election day) Former presidential election: 1996: 4.7% (5th place, 1st round) | Affiliation: PRM | Faculty of Philosophy, University of Bucharest (1971) journalist, writer |
| Theodor Stolojan | Born: 24 October 1943 (age 57); Târgoviște, Dâmbovița County | Prime Minister of Romania (1991–1992); Minister of Finances (1990–1991); Deputy Minister of Finances (1989–1990); Director of Department of International Relations and Financial Relations with the Ministry of Finances and General Inspector of the Department of State Revenues (1988–1989); Director of the State Budget Accounting Department with the Ministry of Finances (1978–1982) | Affiliation: PNL | Faculty of Finances and Accontancy, Bucharest Academy of Economic Studies (1966) financier, accountant |
| Mugur Isărescu | Born: 1 August 1949 (age 51); Drăgășani, Vâlcea County | Prime Minister of Romania (1999–election day); Governor of the National Bank of Romania (1990–1999); Commercial Attaché with the Romanian Embassy in USA (1990) | Affiliation: none Endorsed by: CDR 2000 | Faculty of Foreign Trade, Bucharest Academy of Economic Studies (1971) financier, banker |
| György Frunda | Born: 22 July 1951 (age 49); Târgu Mureș, Mureș County | Senator (1992–election day) Former presidential election: 1996: 6.0% (4th place, 1st round) | Affiliation: UDMR | Faculty of Law, Babeş-Bolyai University, Cluj-Napoca (1974) lawyer |
| Petre Roman | Born: 22 July 1946 (age 54); Bucharest | Minister of Foreign Affairs (1999–election day); Senator (1996–election day); President of the Senate of Romania (1996–1999); Deputy (1990–1996); Prime Minister of Romania (1989–1991) Former presidential election: 1996: 20.5% (3rd place, 1st round) | Affiliation: PD | Faculty of Energy, Politehnica University of Bucharest (1968) hydroelectric powerplant engineer |
| Teodor Meleșcanu | Born: 10 March 1941 (age 59); Brad, Hunedoara County | Senator (1996–election day); Minister of Foreign Affairs (1992–1996); Undesecretary of State with the Minister of Foreign Affairs (1990–1992) | Affiliation: ApR | Faculty of Law, University of Bucharest, (1964); Faculty of Economic and Social Sciences, University of Geneva (1968) jurist, diplomat |
| Eduard Manole | Born: 21 March 1964 (age 36); Constanța, Constanța County | | Affiliation: none | Faculty of Physics, University of Bucharest (unknown year) physicist |
| Graziela Bârlă | unknown birthdate unknown birthplace | | Affiliation: none | Faculty of Law, University of Bucharest (1968) lawyer |
| Paul Lambrino | Born: 13 August 1948 (age 52); Paris, France | | Affiliation: Party of National Reconciliation | Millfield College (1968) art dealer |
| Ion Sasu | Born: 5 March 1944 (age 56); Cugir, Alba County | | Affiliation: PSM | Faculty of Philosophy, University of Bucharest (1968) unknown |
| Niculae Cerveni | Born: 19 March 1926 (age 74); Cervenia, Teleorman County; Died: 16 January 2004, Bucharest | Senator (1996–election day); Deputy (1992–1996) | Affiliation: Romanian Liberal Democratic Party | Faculty of Law, University of Bucharest (1974) lawyer |

== Results ==
=== President ===
Presidential election - First round

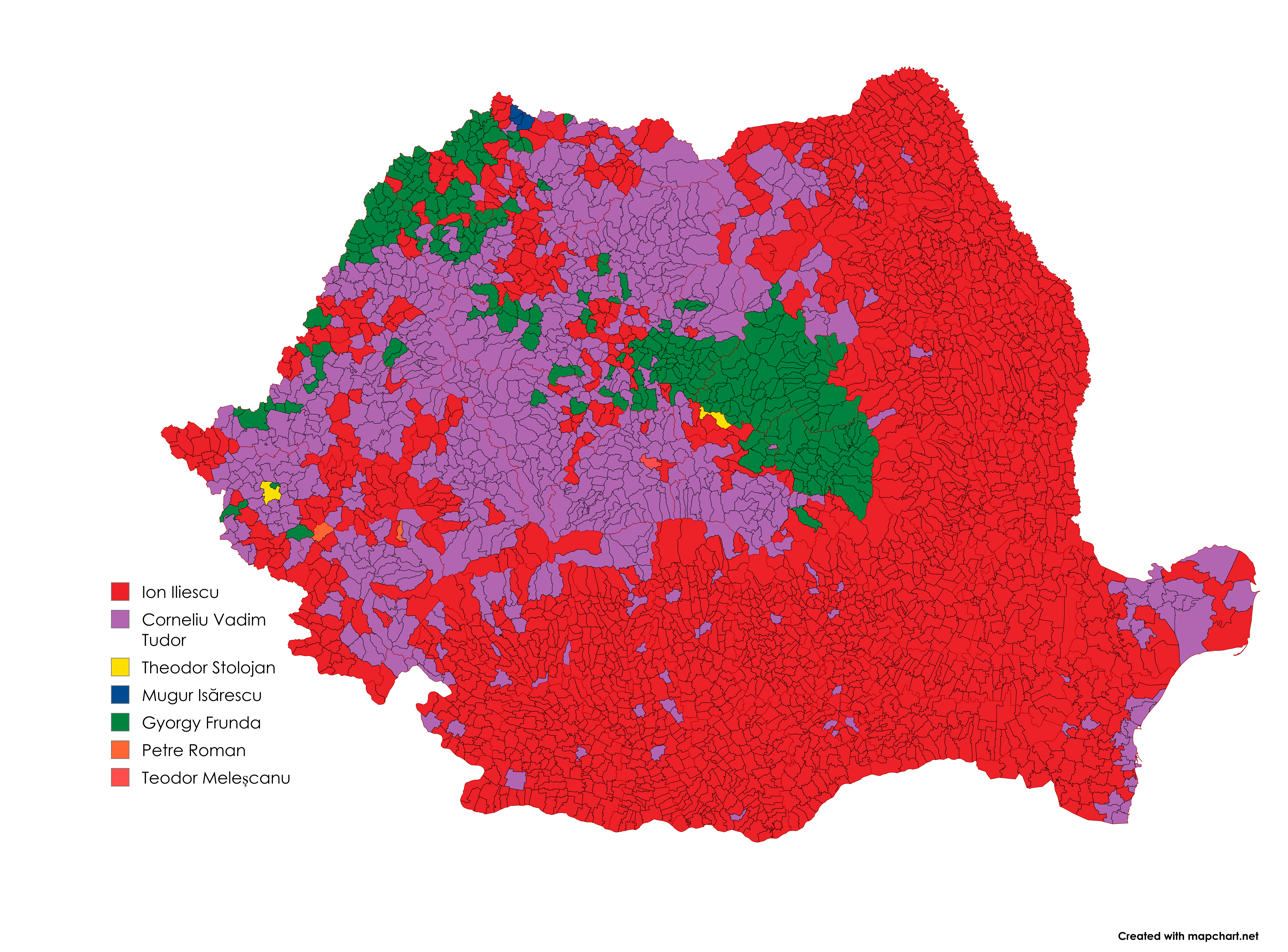
First round result by commune

Presidential election - Second round

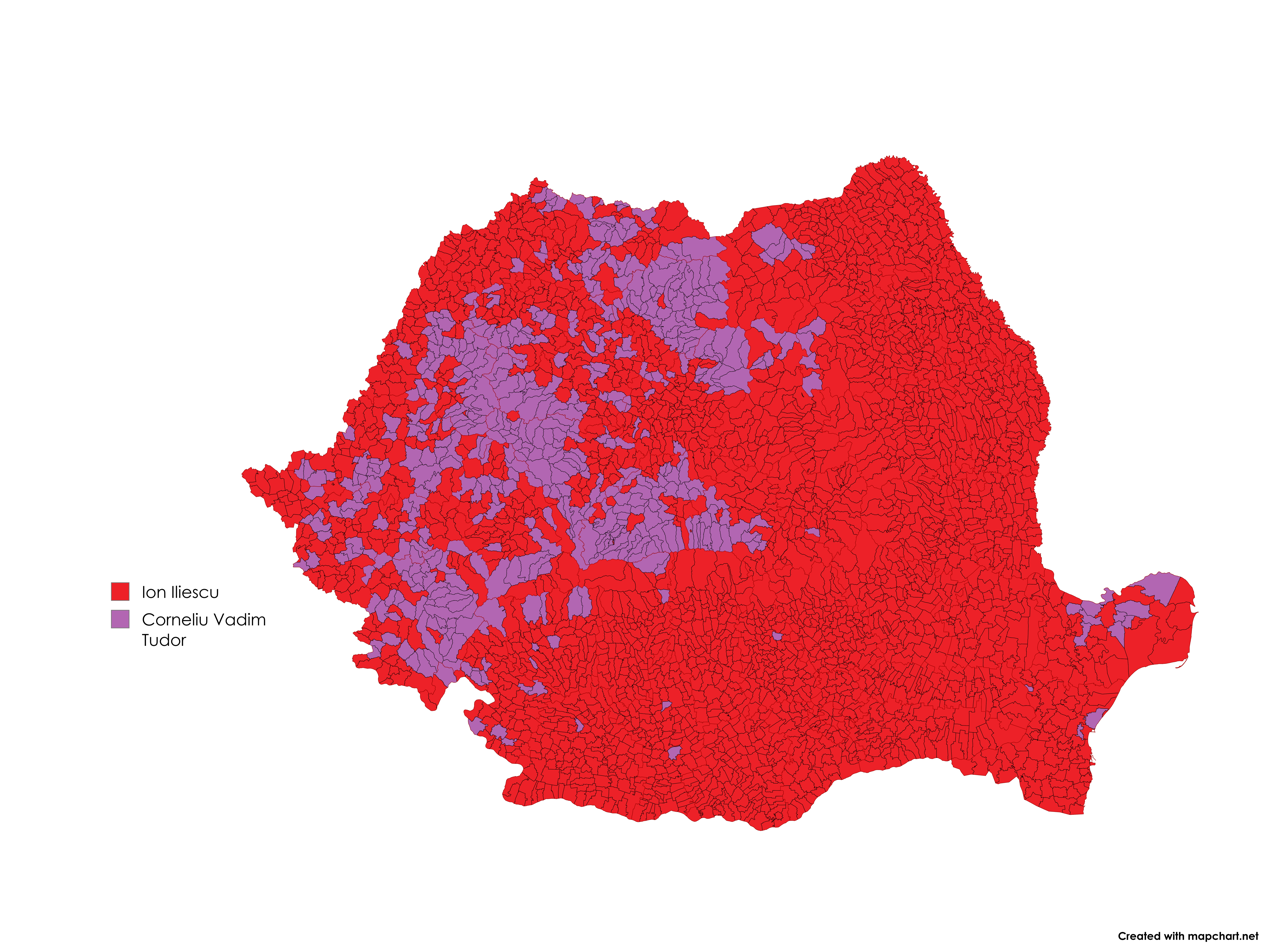
Second round results by commune

In the second round, Theodor Stolojan, Mugur Isărescu, György Frunda, and Petre Roman positioned against Corneliu Vadim Tudor, without openly endorsing Ion Iliescu.

| Candidate | Party | First round | | Second round | |
| Candidate | Party | Votes | % | Votes | % |
|---|---|---|---|---|---|
| Ion Iliescu | Social Democratic Pole of Romania | 4,076,273 | 36.35 | 6,696,623 | 66.83 |
| Corneliu Vadim Tudor | Greater Romania Party | 3,178,293 | 28.34 | 3,324,247 | 33.17 |
| Theodor Stolojan | National Liberal Party | 1,321,420 | 11.78 | | |
| Mugur Isărescu | Romanian Democratic Convention | 1,069,463 | 9.54 | | |
| György Frunda | Democratic Alliance of Hungarians in Romania | 696,989 | 6.22 | | |
| Petre Roman | Democratic Party | 334,852 | 2.99 | | |
| Teodor Meleșcanu | Alliance for Romania | 214,642 | 1.91 | | |
| Eduard Gheorghe Manole | Independent | 133,991 | 1.19 | | |
| Graziela-Elena Bârlă | Independent | 61,455 | 0.55 | | |
| Prince Paul of Romania | Party of National Reconciliation | 55,238 | 0.49 | | |
| Ion Sasu | Socialist Party of Labour | 38,375 | 0.34 | | |
| Niculae Cerveni | Romanian Liberal Democratic Party | 31,983 | 0.29 | | |
| Total | | 11,212,974 | 100.00 | 10,020,870 | 100.00 |
| Valid votes | | 11,212,974 | 97.00 | 10,020,870 | 98.39 |
| Invalid/blank votes | | 346,484 | 3.00 | 163,845 | 1.61 |
| Total votes | | 11,559,458 | 100.00 | 10,184,715 | 100.00 |
| Registered voters/turnout | | 17,699,727 | 65.31 | 17,711,757 | 57.50 |
Source: Nohlen & Stöver

Vote share
Second round
| Iliescu | 66.83% |
| Tudor | 33.17% |
First round
| Iliescu | 36.35% |
| Tudor | 28.34% |
| Stolojan | 11.78% |
| Isărescu | 9.54% |
| Frunda | 6.22% |
| Roman | 2.99% |
| Meleșcanu | 1.91% |
| Manole | 1.19% |
| Others | 1.67% |

=== Parliament ===
==== Senate ====
The alliance named Social Democratic Pole of Romania was formed by PDSR, PSDR (2 senators), and PUR (4 senator). On 16 June 2001, PDSR and PSDR merged, forming the present-day PSD.

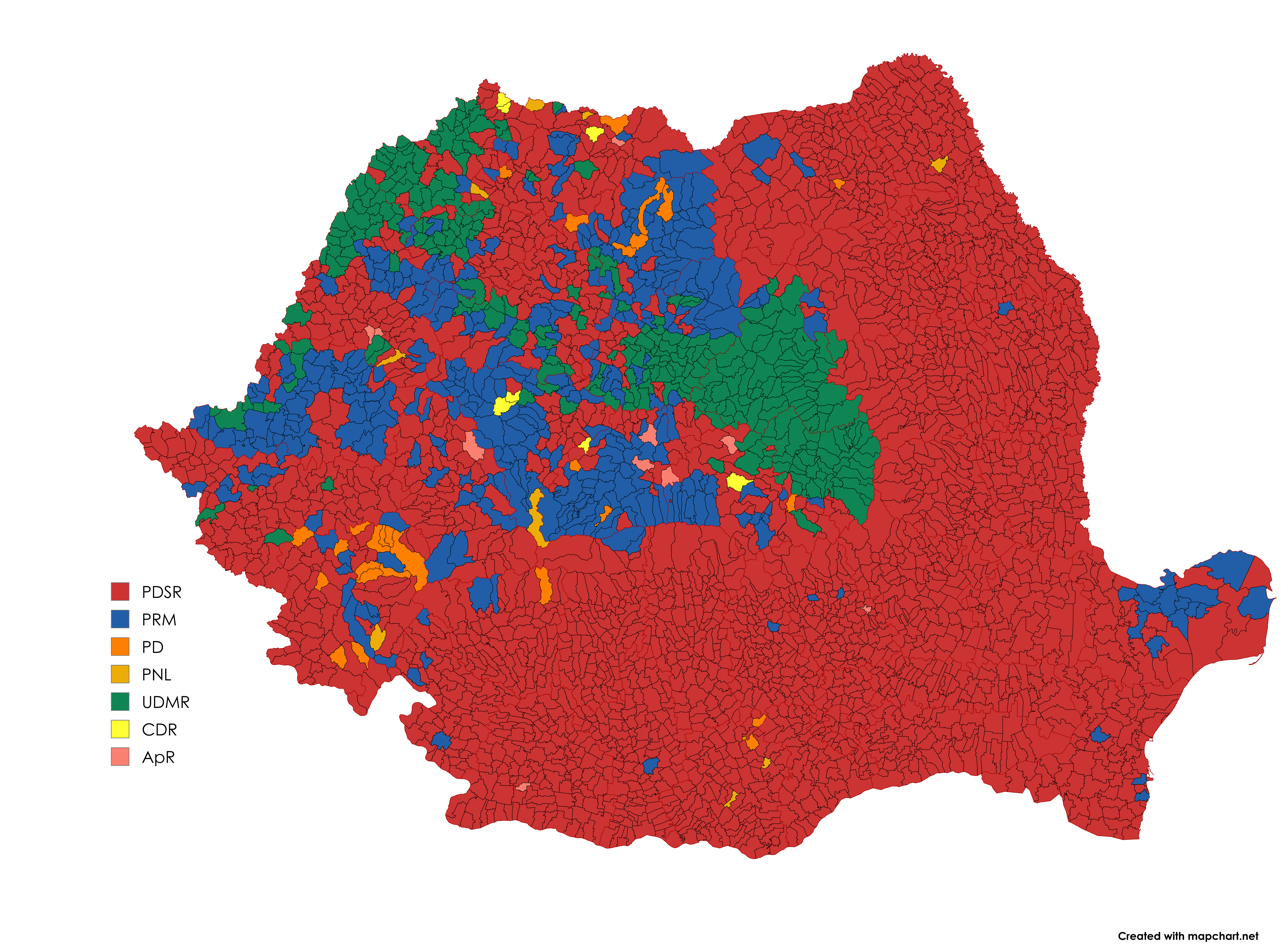
Results of the 2000 Romanian legislative elections, showing the number of votes for the party that won a plurality in each locality. Results for the Senate

| Party | Votes | % | Seats | +/– |
|---|---|---|---|---|
| Social Democratic Pole of Romania | 4,040,212 | 37.09 | 65 | +24 |
| Greater Romania Party | 2,288,483 | 21.01 | 37 | +29 |
| Democratic Party | 825,437 | 7.58 | 13 | – |
| National Liberal Party | 814,381 | 7.48 | 13 | – |
| Democratic Alliance of Hungarians in Romania | 751,310 | 6.90 | 12 | +1 |
| Romanian Democratic Convention | 575,706 | 5.29 | 0 | –53 |
| Alliance for Romania | 465,535 | 4.27 | 0 | New |
| Romanian National Unity Party | 154,761 | 1.42 | 0 | –7 |
| National Liberal Party–Câmpeanu | 133,018 | 1.22 | 0 | New |
| Ecologist Party of Romania | 108,370 | 0.99 | 0 | New |
| Socialist Party of Labour | 96,636 | 0.89 | 0 | 0 |
| Party of Pensioners of Romania | 86,401 | 0.79 | 0 | 0 |
| Romanian Working Party | 81,756 | 0.75 | 0 | 0 |
| Romanian Liberal Democratic Party | 61,234 | 0.56 | 0 | New |
| National Peasant Party | 55,970 | 0.51 | 0 | 0 |
| Party of Romanian Life | 54,634 | 0.50 | 0 | New |
| National Democratic Christian Party | 45,252 | 0.42 | 0 | 0 |
| Party of National Reconciliation | 31,824 | 0.29 | 0 | New |
| Free Republican Socialist Democratic Party | 30,910 | 0.28 | 0 | New |
| New Generation Party | 27,576 | 0.25 | 0 | New |
| Democratic Party of Pensioners in Romania and the Diaspora | 24,346 | 0.22 | 0 | New |
| Social Democratic Party "Constantin Titel Petrescu" | 20,426 | 0.19 | 0 | New |
| Generation 2000 | 18,998 | 0.17 | 0 | New |
| Party of Non-Communists | 18,879 | 0.17 | 0 | New |
| Party for the Motherland | 18,403 | 0.17 | 0 | 0 |
| Socialist Party of Romania | 12,961 | 0.12 | 0 | 0 |
| Republican Party | 12,094 | 0.11 | 0 | 0 |
| Democratic Union of Turkish-Muslim Tatars | 9,226 | 0.08 | 0 | 0 |
| Liberal Union–Brătianu | 7,373 | 0.07 | 0 | New |
| Popular Union for Justice Party | 5,747 | 0.05 | 0 | New |
| Christian Democratic Union | 4,016 | 0.04 | 0 | 0 |
| Party of the Romanian Revolution | 2,146 | 0.02 | 0 | 0 |
| Christian Centre of the Roma in Romania | 2,045 | 0.02 | 0 | New |
| Party of Private Entrepreneurs–Social Democratic Party | 1,575 | 0.01 | 0 | 0 |
| Hungarian Free Democrat Party in Romania | 498 | 0.00 | 0 | 0 |
| International League of the Romanians–Bucharest | 343 | 0.00 | 0 | New |
| Independents | 3,428 | 0.03 | 0 | 0 |
| Total | 10,891,910 | 100.00 | 140 | –3 |
| Valid votes | 10,891,910 | 94.23 | | |
| Invalid/blank votes | 667,548 | 5.77 | | |
| Total votes | 11,559,458 | 100.00 | | |
| Registered voters/turnout | 17,699,727 | 65.31 | | |
Source: Nohlen & Stöver, University of Essex

==== Chamber of Deputies ====
The Social Democratic Pole of Romania included the PDSR, PSDR (10 deputies), and PUR (6 deputies). On 16 June 2001, PDSR and PSDR merged, forming the present-day PSD.

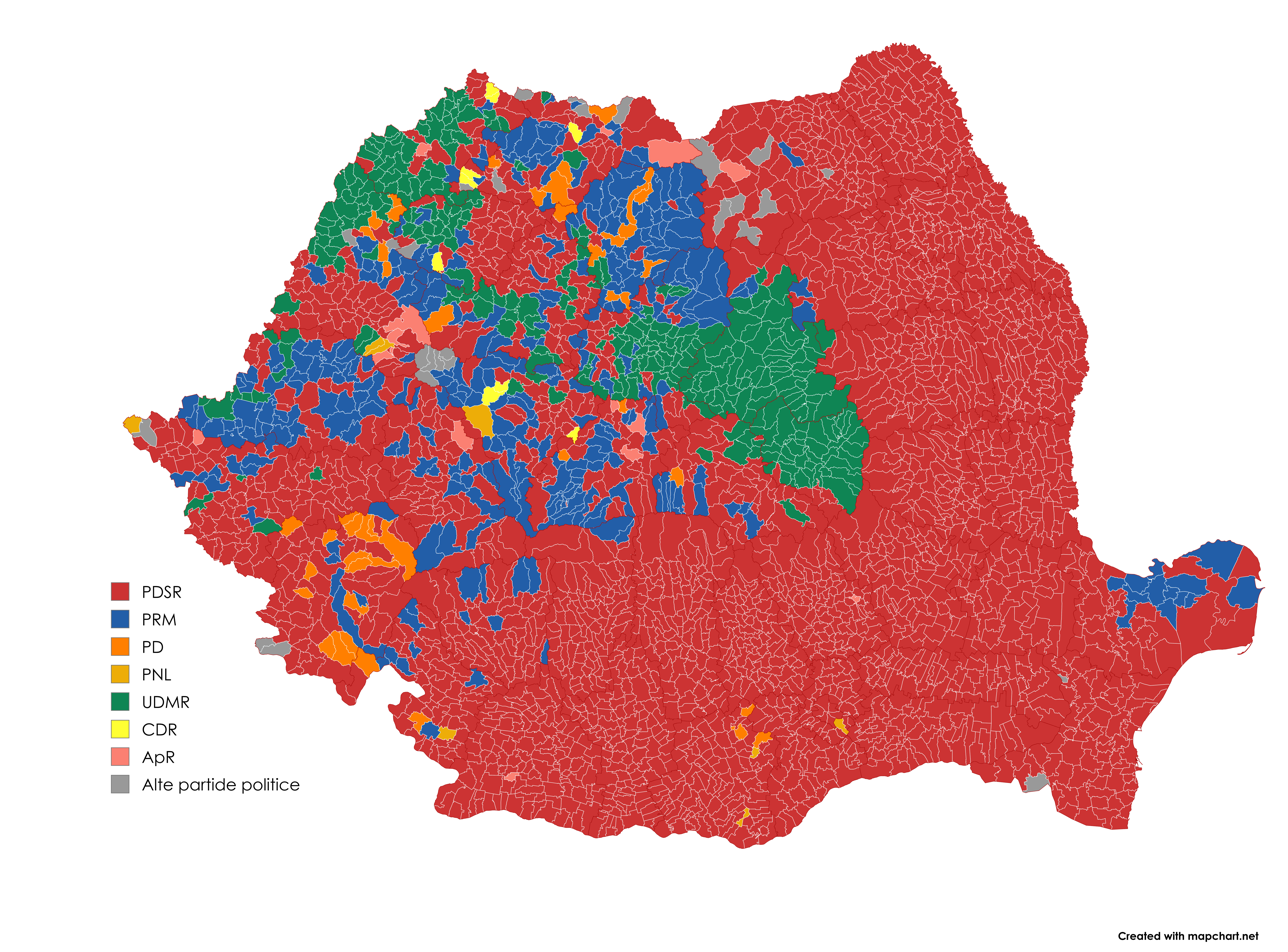
Results of the 2000 Romanian legislative elections, showing the number of votes for the party that won a plurality in each locality. Results for the Chamber of Deputies.

| Party | Votes | % | Seats | +/– |
|---|---|---|---|---|
| Social Democratic Pole of Romania | 3,968,464 | 36.61 | 155 | +64 |
| Greater Romania Party | 2,112,027 | 19.48 | 84 | +65 |
| Democratic Party | 762,365 | 7.03 | 31 | – |
| National Liberal Party | 747,263 | 6.89 | 30 | – |
| Democratic Alliance of Hungarians in Romania | 736,863 | 6.80 | 27 | +2 |
| Romanian Democratic Convention | 546,135 | 5.04 | 0 | –122 |
| Alliance for Romania | 441,228 | 4.07 | 0 | New |
| National Liberal Party–Câmpeanu | 151,518 | 1.40 | 0 | New |
| Romanian National Unity Party | 149,525 | 1.38 | 0 | –18 |
| Ecologist Party of Romania | 101,256 | 0.93 | 0 | New |
| Socialist Party of Labour | 91,027 | 0.84 | 0 | 0 |
| Party of Pensioners of Romania | 76,704 | 0.71 | 0 | 0 |
| Party of the Roma | 71,786 | 0.66 | 1 | 0 |
| Romanian Working Party | 68,718 | 0.63 | 0 | 0 |
| Romanian Liberal Democratic Party | 52,497 | 0.48 | 0 | New |
| National Peasant Party | 48,435 | 0.45 | 0 | 0 |
| Party of Romanian Life | 46,129 | 0.43 | 0 | New |
| Democratic Forum of Germans | 40,844 | 0.38 | 1 | 0 |
| National Democratic Christian Party | 33,410 | 0.31 | 0 | 0 |
| Free Republican Socialist Democratic Party | 32,811 | 0.30 | 0 | New |
| Party of National Reconciliation | 22,376 | 0.21 | 0 | New |
| Union of Armenians of Romania | 21,302 | 0.20 | 1 | 0 |
| Italian Community of Romania | 21,263 | 0.20 | 1 | 0 |
| Democratic Party of Pensioners in Romania and the Diaspora | 21,062 | 0.19 | 0 | New |
| Bulgarian Union of Banat–Romania | 20,085 | 0.19 | 1 | +1 |
| New Generation Party | 19,662 | 0.18 | 0 | New |
| Social Democratic Party "Constantin Titel Petrescu" | 17,730 | 0.16 | 0 | New |
| Party for the Motherland | 16,991 | 0.16 | 0 | 0 |
| League of Italian Communities in Romania | 16,266 | 0.15 | 0 | New |
| Hellenic Union of Romania | 15,007 | 0.14 | 1 | 0 |
| Party of Non-Communists | 14,197 | 0.13 | 0 | New |
| Generation 2000 | 13,455 | 0.12 | 0 | 0 |
| Federation of the Jewish Communities in Romania | 12,629 | 0.12 | 1 | 0 |
| Christian Centre of the Roma in Romania | 12,171 | 0.11 | 0 | New |
| Romanian Socialist Party | 11,916 | 0.11 | 0 | 0 |
| Community of the Lipovan Russians in Romania | 11,558 | 0.11 | 1 | 0 |
| Union of Croats of Romania | 11,084 | 0.10 | 1 | +1 |
| Republican Party | 10,840 | 0.10 | 0 | 0 |
| League of Albanians of Romania | 10,543 | 0.10 | 1 | New |
| Democratic Union of Turkish-Muslim Tatars | 10,380 | 0.10 | 1 | 0 |
| Union of the Ukrainians of Romania | 9,404 | 0.09 | 1 | 0 |
| Association of Macedonians of Romania | 8,809 | 0.08 | 1 | New |
| Union of Serbs of Romania | 8,748 | 0.08 | 1 | 0 |
| Bulgarian Cultural Association of Romania | 8,092 | 0.07 | 0 | New |
| Cultural Union of Albanians of Romania | 7,798 | 0.07 | 0 | –1 |
| Cultural Union of Ruthenians of Romania | 6,942 | 0.06 | 1 | New |
| Democratic Turkish Union of Romania | 6,675 | 0.06 | 1 | 0 |
| Bratstvo Community of Bulgarians in Romania | 5,923 | 0.05 | 0 | –1 |
| Democratic Union of Ukrainians in Romania | 5,843 | 0.05 | 0 | 0 |
| Democratic Union of Slovaks and Czechs of Romania | 5,686 | 0.05 | 1 | 0 |
| Union of Poles of Romania | 5,055 | 0.05 | 1 | 0 |
| Turkish Community of Romania | 3,953 | 0.04 | 0 | New |
| Liberal Union–Brătianu | 3,760 | 0.03 | 0 | 0 |
| Hungarian Free Democrat Party of Romania | 3,510 | 0.03 | 0 | 0 |
| Popular Union for Justice Party | 3,506 | 0.03 | 0 | New |
| Christian Democratic Union | 3,316 | 0.03 | 0 | 0 |
| Hellenic Community Iasi | 2,072 | 0.02 | 0 | New |
| Democratic Union of Croats in Romania | 2,059 | 0.02 | 0 | New |
| Prahova Hellenic Community | 1,992 | 0.02 | 0 | 0 |
| Party of the Romanian Revolution | 1,623 | 0.01 | 0 | 0 |
| Union of Poles of Romania 'Dom Polski' | 1,619 | 0.01 | 0 | 0 |
| Union of the Czechs of Romania | 1,539 | 0.01 | 0 | New |
| Democratic League of the Croats in Romania | 1,329 | 0.01 | 0 | New |
| General Union of the Hutul Ethnicity in Romania | 1,225 | 0.01 | 0 | 0 |
| International League of the Romanians–Bucharest | 516 | 0.00 | 0 | New |
| Union of Pavlicheni Bulgarians in Romania | 497 | 0.00 | 0 | New |
| Hellenic Union ELPIS Constanta | 449 | 0.00 | 0 | New |
| Party of Private Entrepreneurs–Social Democratic Party | 401 | 0.00 | 0 | 0 |
| Independents | 137,561 | 1.27 | 0 | 0 |
| Total | 10,839,424 | 100.00 | 345 | +2 |
| Valid votes | 10,839,424 | 93.77 | | |
| Invalid/blank votes | 720,034 | 6.23 | | |
| Total votes | 11,559,458 | 100.00 | | |
| Registered voters/turnout | 17,699,727 | 65.31 | | |
Source: Nohlen & Stöver, University of Essex

== Gallery ==
Percent of votes of major candidates in the first round:

Ion Iliescu

Corneliu Vadim Tudor

Theodor Stolojan

Mugur Isărescu

György Frunda
