= Emil Constantinescu =

President of Romania from 1996 to 2000

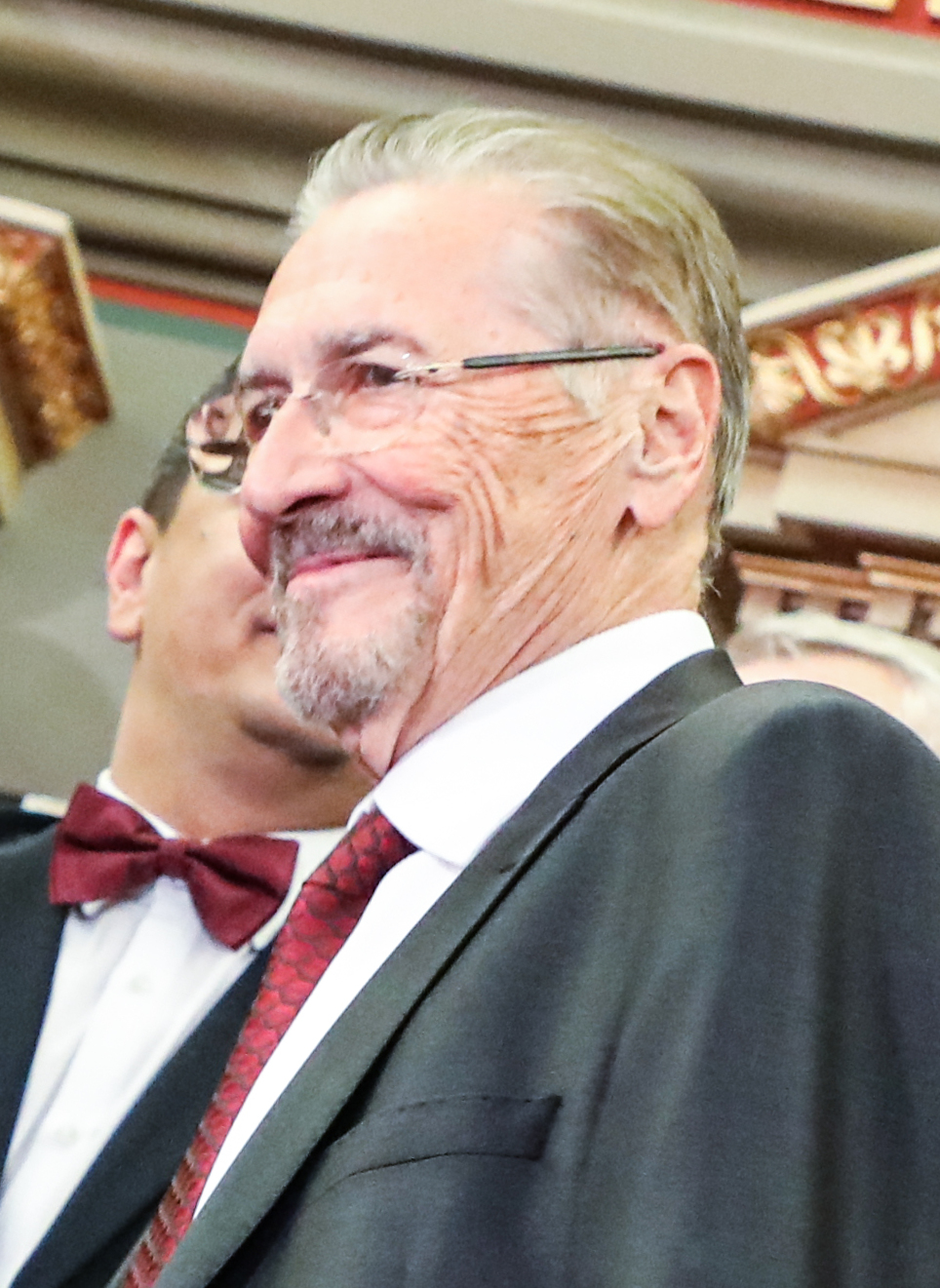
- Constantinescu in 2019

President of Romania
- In office 29 November 1996 – 20 December 2000
- Prime Minister: Nicolae Văcăroiu: Victor Ciorbea; Gavril Dejeu (Acting); Radu Vasile; Alexandru Athanasiu (Acting); Mugur Isărescu
- Preceded by: Ion Iliescu
- Succeeded by: Ion Iliescu

Leader of the Romanian Democratic Convention
- In office November 1992 – 29 November 1996
- Preceded by: Corneliu Coposu

Personal details
- Born: 19 November 1939 (age 86) Tighina, Ținutul Nistru, Kingdom of Romania (present-day de jure Tighina, Republic of Moldova; de facto Bender, Transnistria)
- Party: National Liberal Party (2008–present)
- Other political affiliations: Romanian Communist Party (1965–1989); Christian Democratic National Peasants' Party (1990–1996); Independent (1996–2000; PNȚ-CD membership suspended while president); People's Action (2001–2008)
- Spouse: Nadia Ileana Constantinescu
- Children: 2
- Profession: Professor of Geology
- Religion: Eastern Orthodox

Emil Constantinescu (Note: Romanian pronunciation: [eˈmil konstantiˈnesku]) (born 19 November 1939) is a Romanian politician and professor, who served as the second President of Romania from 1996 to 2000. After the Romanian Revolution of 1989, Constantinescu became a founding member and vice president of the Civic Alliance (AC). In addition, he also served as the acting president of the Democratic Romanian Anti-Totalitarian Forum, the first associative structure of the democratic opposition in post-1989 Romania, which was later transformed into a centre-right political and electoral alliance known as the Romanian Democratic Convention (CDR). He subsequently presided over the People's Action (AP) party from the early 2000s until it merged into the National Liberal Party (PNL) in 2008.

== Early life and education ==
Emil Constantinescu was born on 19 November 1939, in Tighina, Ținutul Nistru, Kingdom of Romania, which today is de facto part of Transnistria. His mother, Maria Georgeta Colceag, was born in Ploiești on 24 April 1916, and, after graduating from high school, was a student at the Bucharest Conservatory in the harp class, but gave up her career in music to follow her husband, Ion Constantinescu. He was originally from Oltenia, he had 8 brothers, and after becoming an agronomist engineer, he was assigned to Bessarabia. The Constantinescu family took refuge in 1943 in Brădetu village, Argeș County where Emil spent his childhood. His sister, Marina, was born in 1942, and in 1946, his brother, Cristian, was born.

From 1953 to 1956, Constantinescu was a student of the "Nicolae Bălcescu" High School in Pitești (currently Colegiu I.C. Brătianu), and obtained his matriculation diploma on 19 July 1956. In the same year, he enrolled at the Faculty of Law of the University of Bucharest. He obtained a Diploma in Legal Sciences in 1960 and after completing his military internship in Piatra Neamț, he began his work as a trainee judge at the Pitesti Regional Court, economic section. The political climate caused him to give up this position and become a student at the Faculty of Geology – Geography, between 1961 and 1966. He holds a PhD in Geology from the University of Bucharest and a Doctor of Sciences from Duke University.

In 1963, he married Nadia Ileana, a lawyer, who was his colleague at the Faculty of Law in Bucharest. His father died in 1991, and his mother died in 2011.

== Professional career ==
Constantinescu went through all stages of his university career as an assistant and lecturer at the Faculty of Geology (1966–1990). Since 1991 onwards, he has been a professor of Mineralogy at the University of Bucharest. He was also a visiting professor at Duke University in the United States between 1991 and 1992. He was elected vice‑rector (1990–1992) and rector (1992–1996) of the University of Bucharest; president of the National Council of Rectors from Romania (1992–1996); member of the Permanent Committee of the Association of European Universities – CRE (1992–1993; 1994–1998); and member of the International Association of University Presidents IAUP (1994–1996).

He is the author of 12 books and over 60 studies in the field of geology, published in prestigious scientific journals in the country and abroad. He is also an honorary member and elected member of the Geological and Mineralogical Societies of the United Kingdom, Germany, the United States, Greece, and Japan; of the Geographical Society of France and the National Geographic Society in the United States.

Constantinescu has lectured at major universities, including the University of Tübingen, the University of Oxford, Stanford University, Harvard University, Berkeley, Columbia, and Georgetown, and has spoken in cities such as Bloomington, Rio de Janeiro, Sydney, Prague, Turku, Cairo, and Lublin. His honors include the Romanian Academy Award for contributions to geology (1980); Palmas Academicas from the Brazilian Academy of Letters (2000); gold and honorary medals from Comenius University, Charles University, and the University of São Paulo; the Arthur Bertrand Medal from the French Academy of Sciences; and medals from the National Institute of Sciences and Arts of France, the Sorbonne, and the University of Amsterdam.

== Political activity (1990–1996) ==
After the fall of the communist dictatorship, Constantinescu engaged along with other university colleagues and renowned Romanian intellectuals in the effort to re‑democratize Romania, in the defense of fundamental human rights and freedoms, as well as in the establishment of civil society. He was one of the personalities who protested against the anti‑democratic actions of the new authorities during a 42‑day rally, between April and May 1990, in Bucharest's University Square.

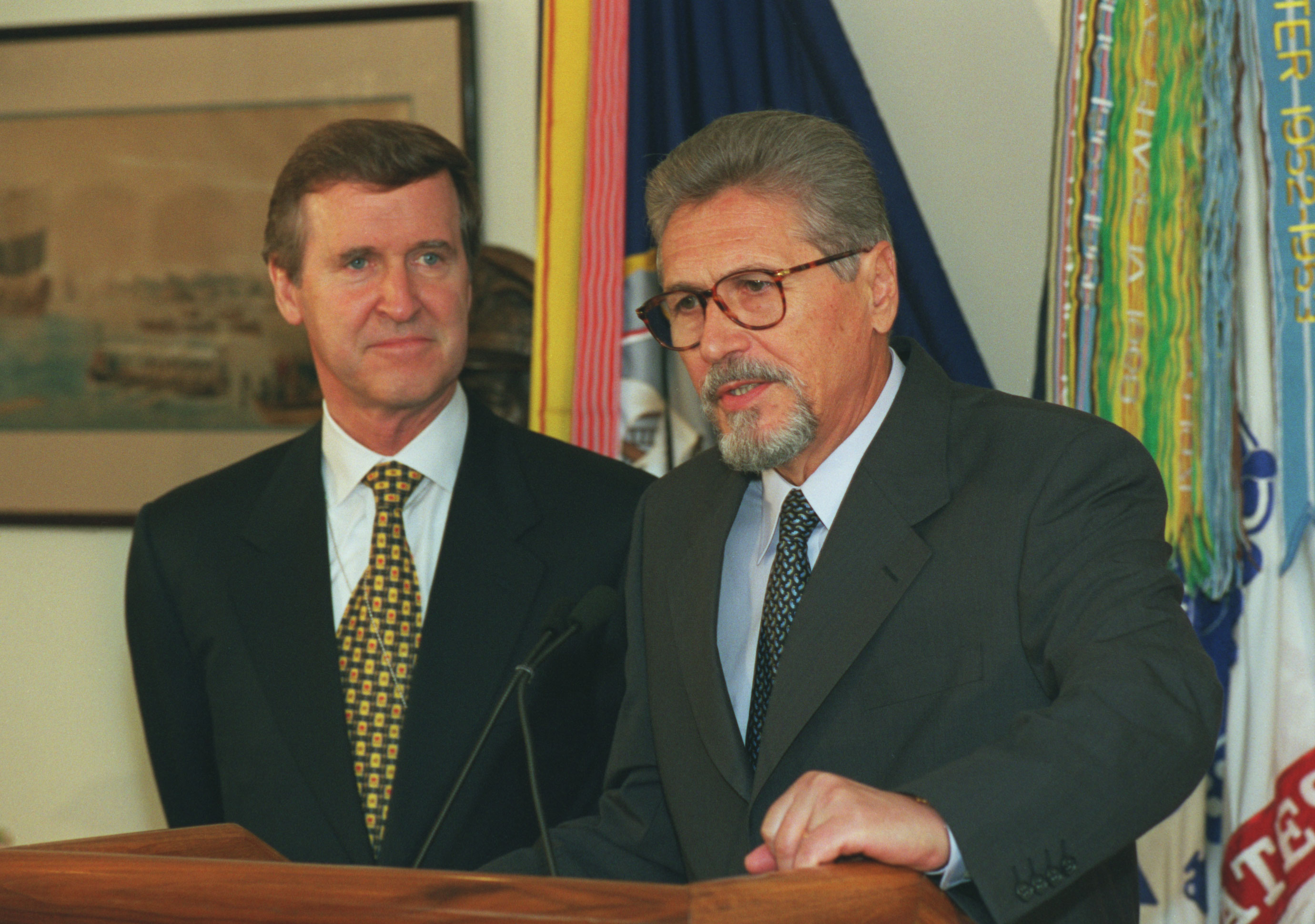
Constantinescu with the U.S. Secretary of Defense William Cohen in an official visit to the Pentagon in the United States in July 1998

Following the violent events of June 1990, when miners—at the call of then president Ion Iliescu—entered Bucharest, he founded, together with colleagues, professors, and students, the association *Solidaritatea Universitară* ('Academic Solidarity'). He was also a founding member and vice‑president of the Civic Alliance (1990), the most important non‑governmental organization in the country, and president of the Civic Academy. These associations joined the opposition democratic parties and together formed the Romanian Democratic Convention (CDR) in 1991. At the proposal of the Academic Solidarity, supported by the Civic Alliance (PAC), Constantinescu was designated the CDR candidate in the presidential elections of 1992. He entered the second round and obtained 38% of the votes in the confrontation with then incumbent president Ion Iliescu, who was supported by the Democratic National Salvation Front (FDSN). After this first important political experience, the CDR elected in 1992 its president and sole candidate for the presidential elections of 1996 (which was represented by Constantinescu). He continued to act to strengthen the democratic opposition throughout this period from 1992 until 1996, alongside other notable CDR political leaders.

== Presidency (1996–2000) ==
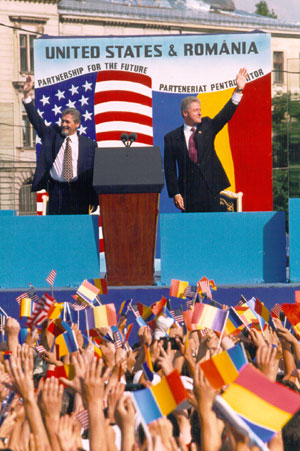
Constantinescu and Bill Clinton in Bucharest during the American president's 1997 visit to the Romanian capital, in which Clinton declared Romania "free of communism"

In 1996, Constantinescu competed once again for the presidency as the CDR's candidate and managed to defeat Iliescu in the second round, securing a victory by a margin of roughly 10%. CDR's success in the 1996 general election marked the first peaceful transition of power in post-1989 Romania. On the day he took office, he suspended his membership in the PNȚ-CD, as the Constitution precludes a president holding formal membership of a political party during his term(s).

Throughout his sole four-year term, Constantinescu struggled with the ineffective implementation of the processes of privatization, which, bogged down by excessive bureaucracy, increased unemployment and poverty in the short term. After another two Mineriads, which took place in 1999 (one in January and the other in February), culminating with the arrest of Miron Cozma, the remainder of his term suffered a political crisis between the majority parties that, at the time, formed the governing coalition (i.e., CDR, PD, PSDR, and UDMR/RMDSZ). The country was further damaged by a drought in 2000. At the end of his term in 2000, he decided not to run for re-election, stating that the system had defeated him.

One of the last gestures he made as president of Romania was the pardon of Ion Coman, a former Romanian Armed Forces general who was in charge of the repression of the 1989 Romanian revolution in Timișoara.

== Post-presidency (2000–present) ==
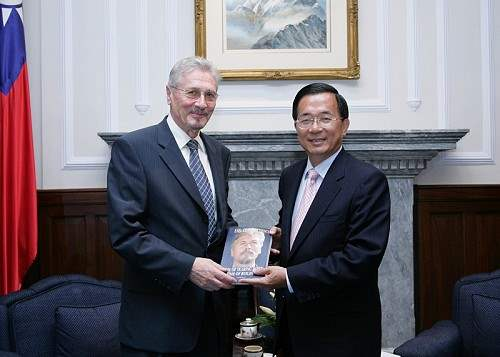
Constantinescu in a meeting with Taiwanese President Chen Shui-bian in 2008

Constantinescu's presidency, along with CDR's governance, was marred by an economic recession. Despite this, his presidency has been eventually credited with putting an end to the Mineriads, a reform of the banking system, as well as with the attraction of the first major foreign investments in Romania after 1989. With dashed expectations of an immediate improvement in daily life, Romanians exhibited strong disillusionment with the major parties and politicians of the CDR at the end of the 1996–2000 legislature, with the Greater Romania Party (PRM) subsequently gaining second place in the 2000 legislative election.

A disenchanted Constantinescu, who lost popularity and had failed to fulfil his reformist agenda, announced on 17 July 2000 that he would not run for a second term. He temporarily withdrew from political life at the end of his term in November 2000. However, after Ion Iliescu's return to power in 2000, Constantinescu continued to be actively engaged in foreign affairs. Eventually, Romania joined NATO in 2004 and the European Union (EU) three years later, in 2007, alongside Bulgaria.

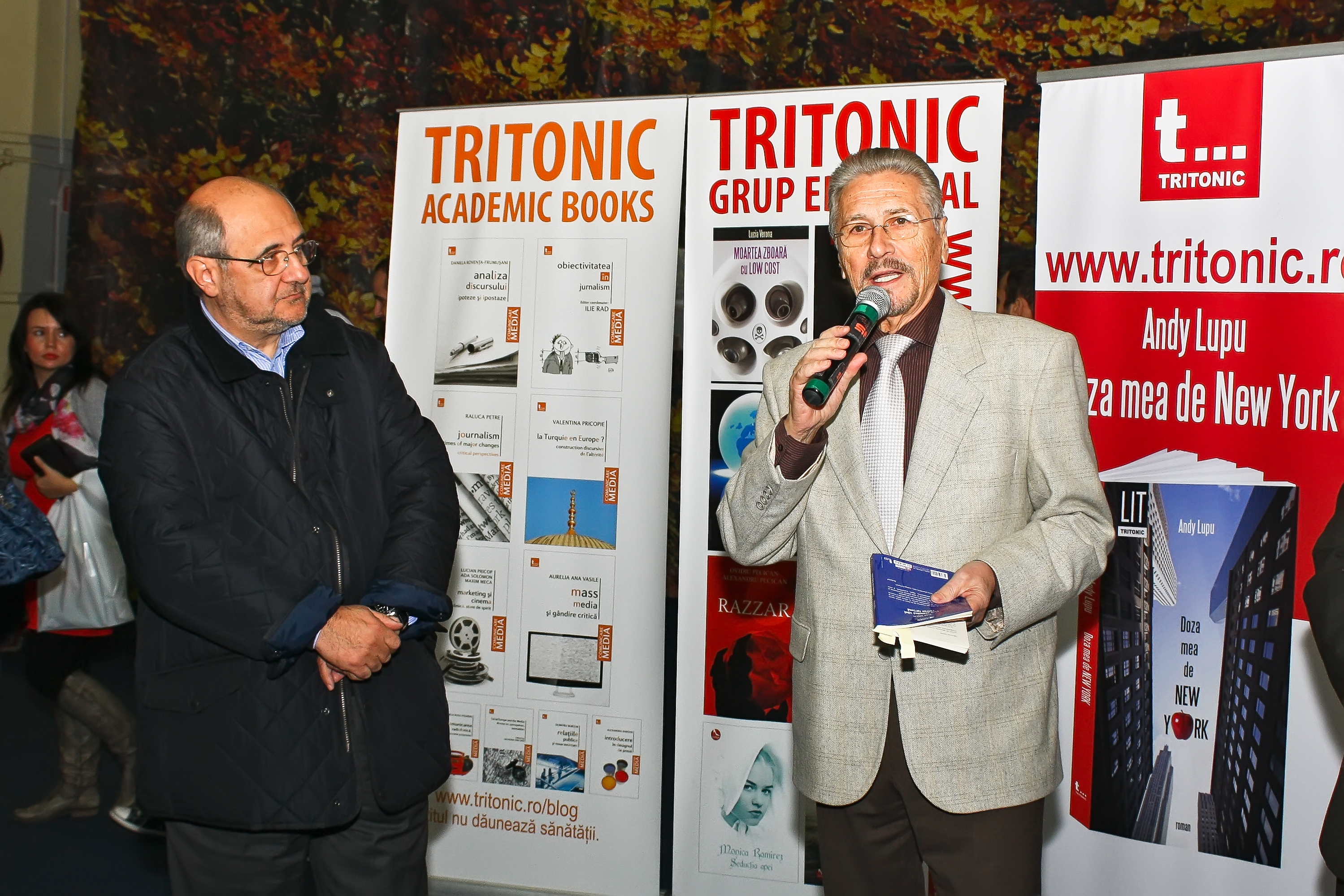
Constantinescu at the Gaudeamus Book Fair in 2013

Constantinescu returned to the political scene in 2002 as head of the People's Action (AP; Acțiunea Populară) party, which subsequently merged with the National Liberal Party (PNL) in 2008.

Constantinescu had occasionally criticized the policies of the 2004–2014 president, Traian Băsescu, accusing him of authoritarian tendencies, and supported Crin Antonescu in the first round of the 2009 presidential elections.

Constantinescu remains heavily involved in politics through working for many NGOs, both in Romania and internationally. He is the current president of the Association of Citizenship Education at the Romanian Foundation for Democracy, and was also the founding president of the Institute for Regional Cooperation and Conflict Prevention (INCOR).

A frequent speaker at the Oslo Freedom Forum, in 2010, he presented the OFF with a presidential medal. He is also a member of the international advisory council of the Victims of Communism Memorial Foundation.

In July 2023, Constantinescu criticised Romanian lawmakers for a lack of vision and long-term strategy for the country's future.

As of 2025, President Emil Constantinescu remains the oldest living president of Romania, following the death of former President Ion Iliescu in August 2025.

== Honours and awards ==
=== National honours ===
- Romania:
  - Order of the Star of Romania, 1st Class
  - Emblema de Onoare a Armatei României ("The Romanian Army's Badge of Honor") – 24 October 2012

=== Foreign honours ===
- Austria: Grand Star of the Decoration of Honour for Services to the Republic of Austria (1999)
- Croatia: Grand Cross of the Grand Order of King Tomislav (2000)
- Denmark: Knight of the Order of the Elephant (2000)
- Finland: Grand Cross with Collar of the Order of the White Rose of Finland (1998)
- Peru: Grand Cross with Diamonds of the Order of the Sun of Peru (2 September 1998)
- Norway: Grand Cross of the Order of St. Olav (1999)
- Portugal: Grand Collar of the Order of Prince Henry (2000)
- Slovakia: Grand Cross (or 1st Class) of the Order of the White Double Cross (2000)
- Turkey: Order of the State of Republic of Turkey (1999)
- Ukraine: First Class of the Order of Prince Yaroslav the Wise (2000)
- United Kingdom: Honorary Knight Grand Cross of the Order of St Michael and St George (2000)

== Electoral history ==
=== Presidential elections ===
Election	Affiliation	First round			Second round		
Election	Affiliation	Votes	Percentage	Position	Votes	Percentage	Position
1992	CDR	3,717,006	31.1%	2nd	4,641,207	38.6%	2nd
1996	CDR	3,569,941	28.2%	2nd	7,057,906	54.4%	1st
