= Greater Romania Party =

Greater Romania Party Partidul România Mare
- President: Victor Iovici
- Founder: Corneliu Vadim Tudor; Eugen Barbu
- Founded: 20 June 1991
- Headquarters: Bucharest
- Membership: 37,000 (2014 est.)
- Ideology: Romanian nationalism; Romanian irredentism; Right-wing populism; National conservatism; Social conservatism; Social democracy; Soft Euroscepticism; Anti-Hungarian sentiment; Historical: National communism (before 2000)
- Political position: Fiscal: Centre-left; Social: Far-right
- Religion: Romanian Orthodoxy
- National affiliation: National Identity Bloc in Europe (2017–19); Romania First Political Platform (2025–present)
- European affiliation: Euronat
- European Parliament group: Identity, Tradition, Sovereignty (2007)
- Colours: Blue; Yellow
- Senate: 0 / 136
- Chamber of Deputies: 0 / 330
- European Parliament: 0 / 33
- Mayors: 0 / 3,176
- County Councilors: 0 / 1,338
- Local Council Councilors: 0 / 39,900

Website
- partidulromaniamare.ropartidulromaniamare.com

The Greater Romania Party (Romanian: Partidul România Mare, PRM) is a Romanian far-right political party. Founded in May 1991 by Eugen Barbu and Corneliu Vadim Tudor, it was led by the latter from that point until his death in September 2015. The party is sometimes referred to in English as the Great Romania Party.

It briefly participated in government from 1993 to 1995 (in Nicolae Văcăroiu's cabinet). In 2000, Tudor received the second largest number of votes in Romania's presidential elections, partially as a result of protest votes lodged by Romanians frustrated with the fractionalisation and mixed performance of the 1996–2000 Romanian Democratic Convention (CDR) government. Tudor's second-place position ensured he would compete in the second round run-off against former president and Party of Social Democracy in Romania (PDSR) candidate Ion Iliescu, who won by a large margin. Parallels are often drawn with the situation in France two years later, when far-right National Rally (RN) party leader Jean-Marie Le Pen similarly drew the second largest number of votes and was elevated, but nevertheless defeated, in the presidential run-off against Jacques Chirac.

Although Tudor clearly remained the central figure in the PRM, in March 2005 he briefly stepped down from the party presidency in favour of Corneliu Ciontu. A primary objective of the move was to provide the appearance of a shift toward the political center and to attempt to align PRM with the European People's Party (EPP) bloc in the European Parliament. During this period the PRM also briefly changed its name to the Greater Romania's People Party. EPP, however, rejected the PRM as a potential member. Tudor stated he refused to join the EPP because of its lack of identity. In June 2005, Tudor asserted that he had decided the new leadership had distanced itself from the founding principles of the party, and he sacked the new leadership and reverted the party's name back to simply the "Greater Romania Party". In November 2005, Ciontu, along with a small faction of the PRM, formed their own party, the People's Party (PP), which has since merged with the New Generation Party (PNG).

In January 2007, with Romania's accession to the EU România Mare's five MEPs joined a group of far-right parties in the European Parliament that included the French National Rally (RN) and Austrian Freedom Party (FPÖ), giving them sufficient numbers to form an official bloc, called Identity, Tradition, Sovereignty. Though due to disagreements, they left the group a few months later, causing its collapse. PRM was also a founding member of Euronat.

== History and ideology ==
The party was founded in 1991 by Tudor, who was formerly known as a "court poet" of communist dictator Nicolae Ceaușescu, and his literary mentor, the writer Eugen Barbu, one year after Tudor launched the România Mare weekly magazine, which remains the most important propaganda tool of the PRM. Tudor subsequently launched a companion daily newspaper called Tricolorul or Ziarul Tricolorul. The party claimed to be center-left and national. (The historical expression Greater Romania refers to the idea of recreating the former Kingdom of Romania which existed during the interwar period. Having been the largest entity to bear the name of Romania, the frontiers were marked with the intent of uniting most territories inhabited by ethnic Romanians into a single country; and it is now a rallying cry for Romanian nationalists. Due to internal conditions under Communism after World War II, the expression's use was forbidden in publications until 1990, after the Romanian Revolution.) The party's initial success was partly attributed to the deep rootedness of Ceaușescu's national communism in Romania. The party was accused of promoting anti-Romani sentiments.

Both the ideology and the main political focus of the Greater Romania Party (PRM) are reflected in frequently strongly nationalistic articles written by Tudor. The party has called for the outlawing of the ethnic Hungarian party, the Democratic Alliance of Hungarians in Romania (UDMR), for allegedly plotting the secession of Transylvania.

PRM promotes the idea of a "Greater Romania" that would bring together all the territories populated by Romanians in neighboring countries (Ukraine and Moldova). It especially calls for the annexation of Moldova.

The party has praised and shown nostalgia for both the military dictatorship of Axis ally Ion Antonescu, whom they consider a hero or even a saint, and the communist regime of Ceaușescu. The party rejected the 2006 Tismăneanu report on the communist dictatorship in Romania as a manipulation of history.

In 2003, Tudor said he would no longer engage in discourse against Jews and Judaism or deny the Holocaust (see Corneliu Vadim Tudor). He also said that he had become, in his own words, a "philo-Semite". In subsequent months he and some of his supporters travelled to Poland to visit the Auschwitz concentration camp; and, despite strong objections from the family of slain Israeli Prime Minister Yitzhak Rabin and many Jewish organisations, Tudor illegally erected a statue in memory of Rabin in the city of Brașov (for which he was found guilty and fined). During this period, Tudor hired Nati Meir, a Jewish advisor, who ran and won as a PRM candidate for the Romanian Chamber of Deputies. Tudor also hired an Israeli public relations firm, Arad Communications, to run his campaign.

In 2013, Friedrich Ebert Foundation described the party as neolegionary.

Economically, PRM proposes social-democratic measures, speaking of "the equality of chances for all citizens, human solidarity and family values" and of "the development of national economy as a condition for a decent living for all citizens", and being in favour of the state's intervention in economy.

In 2024, the current president of the party, Victor Iovici, declared that the party is "centrist, with a patriotic orientation" and that "it collaborates with both left-wing and right-wing patriotic parties, as long as they are moderate and not extremist".

== Party leaders ==
- Corneliu Vadim Tudor (1991–2015)
- Emil Străinu (2015–2016)
- Victor Iovici (2017–present)

== Electoral history ==
=== Legislative elections ===
Election	Chamber			Senate			Position	Aftermath
Election	Votes	%	Seats	Votes	%	Seats	Position	Aftermath
1992	424,061	3.89	16 / 341	422,545	3.85	6 / 143	6th	PDSR-PUNR-PRM-PSM government (1992–1996)
1992	424,061	3.89	16 / 341	422,545	3.85	6 / 143	6th	Endorsing PDSR-PUNR-PSM government (1996)
1996	545,430	4.46	19 / 343	558,026	4.54	8 / 143	5th	Opposition to CDR-USD-UDMR government (1996–2000)
2000	2,112,027	19.48	84 / 345	2,288,483	21.01	37 / 140	2nd	Opposition to PDSR minority government (2000–2004)
2004	1,316,751	12.92	48 / 332	1,394,698	13.3	21 / 137	3rd	Opposition to DA-PUR-UDMR government (2004–2007)
2004	1,316,751	12.92	48 / 332	1,394,698	13.3	21 / 137	3rd	Opposition to PNL-UDMR minority government (2007–2008)
2008	217,595	3.16	0 / 334	245,930	3.57	0 / 137	5th	Extra-parliamentary opposition to PDL-PSD government (2008–2009)
2008	217,595	3.16	0 / 334	245,930	3.57	0 / 137	5th	Extra-parliamentary opposition to PDL-UNPR-UDMR government (2009–2012)
2008	217,595	3.16	0 / 334	245,930	3.57	0 / 137	5th	Extra-parliamentary endorsement for USL government (2012)
2012	92,382	1.25	0 / 412	109,142	1.47	0 / 176	5th	Extra-parliamentary endorsement for USL government (2012–2014)
2012	92,382	1.25	0 / 412	109,142	1.47	0 / 176	5th	Extra-parliamentary opposition to PSD-UNPR-UDMR-PC government (2014)
2012	92,382	1.25	0 / 412	109,142	1.47	0 / 176	5th	Extra-parliamentary endorsement for PSD-UNPR-ALDE government (2014–2015)
2012	92,382	1.25	0 / 412	109,142	1.47	0 / 176	5th	Extra-parliamentary opposition to the technocratic Cioloș Cabinet (2015–2017)
2016	73,264	1.04	0 / 329	83,568	1.18	0 / 136	8th	Extra-parliamentary opposition to PSD-ALDE government (2017–2019)
2016	73,264	1.04	0 / 329	83,568	1.18	0 / 136	8th	Extra-parliamentary endorsement to PSD minority government (2019)
2016	73,264	1.04	0 / 329	83,568	1.18	0 / 136	8th	Extra-parliamentary endorsement to PNL minority government (2019–2020)
2020	32,655	0.55	0 / 330	38,475	0.65	0 / 136	10th	Extra-parliamentary opposition to PNL-USR PLUS-UDMR government (2020–2021)
2024	did not compete							

=== Local elections ===
Election	County Councilors (CJ)			Mayors			Local Councilors (CL)			Popular vote	%	Position
Election	Votes	%	Seats	Votes	%	Seats	Votes	%	Seats	Popular vote	%	Position
2016	—N/a	—N/a	0 / 1,434	—N/a	—N/a	0 / 3,186	—N/a	—N/a	141 / 40,067	—N/a	—N/a	N/A
2020	27,279	0.38	0 / 1,340	11,693	0.14	0 / 3,176	20,928	0.26	31 / 39,900	—N/a	—N/a	22nd

=== Presidential elections ===
Election	Candidate	First round			Second round		
Election	Candidate	Votes	Percentage	Position	Votes	Percentage	Position
1992	did not compete						
1996	Corneliu Vadim Tudor	597,508	4.7%	5th			
2000	Corneliu Vadim Tudor	3,178,293	28.3%	2nd	3,324,247	33.2%	2nd
2004	Corneliu Vadim Tudor	1,313,714	12.6%	3rd			
2009	Corneliu Vadim Tudor	540,380	5.56%	4th			
2014	Corneliu Vadim Tudor	349,416	3.68%	7th			
2019	did not compete						
2024	did not compete						

=== European elections ===
Election	Votes	Percentage	MEPs	Position	EU Party	EP Group
2007	212,596	4.15%	0 / 32	7th	—	—
2009	419,094	8.65%	2 / 33	5th ^{1}	—	NI
2014	150,484	2.70%	0 / 32	8th	—	—
2019	did not compete					
2024	59,272	0.66%	0 / 32	10th	—	—

Note:
^{1} PNG-CD competed on PRM ballot, thus gaining 1 MEP.
