= Social Democratic Pole of Romania =

Social Democratic Pole of Romania Polul Democrat-Social din România
- Abbreviation: PDSR
- Leader: Ion Iliescu (2000); Adrian Năstase (2000-2003); Alexandru Athanasiu (2000-2001); Dan Voiculescu (2000-2003)
- Founded: 7 September 2000
- Dissolved: 16 June 2003
- Succeeded by: National Union PSD+PUR
- Ideology: Social democracy Left-wing nationalism Left-wing populism Pro-Europeanism
- Political position: Center-left
- European affiliation: Party of European Socialists
- International affiliation: Socialist International
- Constituent parties: PDSR (until 2001); PSDR (until 2001); PSD (2001-2003); Romanian Humanist Party

The Social Democratic Pole of Romania (Romanian: Polul Democrat-Social din România, PDSR) was an electoral alliance in Romania ruling from 2000 to 2003 in a coalition government.

== History ==
=== Formation ===
It was founded by the Party of Social Democracy in Romania (PDSR), and of two smaller parties, the Romanian Social Democratic Party (PSDR) and the Humanist Party of Romania (PUR).

=== 2000 legislative election ===
In the 2000 legislative election, they gained 155 of 346 seats in the Chamber of Deputies, and 65 of 143 seats in the Senate. In 2001, the PDSR and PSDR merged into the Social Democratic Party (PSD).

=== Dissolution ===
The two remaining parties dissolved the alliance in 2004, ahead of the local elections, in which they competed against each other. The PUR even attacked the PSD heavily for its system of "local barons". For the parliamentary election in November, they still managed to set up a new alliance, called National Union PSD+PUR to counter the center-right Justice and Truth Alliance (DA).

== Electoral history ==
=== Legislative elections ===
| Election | Chamber | | | Senate | | | Position | Aftermath |
| Election | Votes | % | Seats | Votes | % | Seats | Position | Aftermath |
|---|---|---|---|---|---|---|---|---|
| 2000 | 3,968,464 | 36.61 | 155 / 345 | 4,040,212 | 37.09 | 65 / 140 | 1st ^{1} | PDSR minority government (with UDMR support) |

Notes:

^{1} Social Democratic Pole of Romania members: PDSR (59 senators and 139 deputies), PSDR (2 senators and 10 deputies), and PUR (4 senators and 6 deputies).

=== Presidential elections ===
| Election | Candidate | First round | | | Second round | | |
| Election | Candidate | Votes | Percentage | Position | Votes | Percentage | Position |
|---|---|---|---|---|---|---|---|
| 2000 | Ion Iliescu | 4,076,273 | 36.4% | 1st | 6,696,623 | 66.8% | 1st |

== See also ==
- Politics of Romania
- List of political parties in Romania
