= Radu Câmpeanu =

Romanian politician (1922–2016)

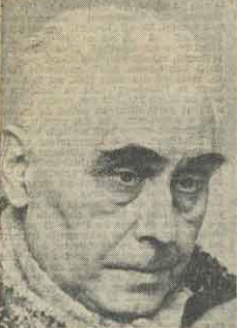
- Radu Câmpeanu featured in Revista 22, 1990

Founding Leader of the National Liberal Party
- In office 15 January 1990 – 28 February 1993
- Succeeded by: Mircea Ionescu-Quintus

Member of the Senate of Romania
- In office 9 June 1990 – 15 October 1992
- In office 13 December 2004 – 14 December 2008

Personal details
- Born: Radu Anton Câmpeanu; February 28, 1922 Răzvad, Dâmbovița County, Kingdom of Romania
- Died: October 19, 2016 (aged 94) Bucharest, Romania
- Resting place: Bellu Cemetery, Bucharest
- Party: National Liberal Party (PNL)
- Spouse(s): Monica Papadopol; Dina Câmpeanu
- Children: 1
- Education: University of Bucharest
- Occupation: Politician, jurist, economist
- Known for: Re-founding the historical National Liberal Party (PNL) and contributing to the reinstating of democracy in Romania after 1989

Radu-Anton Câmpeanu (Romanian pronunciation: [ˈradu kɨmˈpe̯anu]; 28 February 1922 – 19 October 2016) was a Romanian politician who was also jurist and economist by profession, after graduating from the University of Bucharest (UB) in November 1945, specializing in constitutional right. During the interwar period and up until 1945, he was the leader of the National Liberal students' association at nationwide level (the equivalent of today's National Liberal Youth Wing or TNL for short).

While in exile abroad in France, at some point in time due to the exile of Paul Goma and his arrival in France as well, Câmpeanu was suspected to have become an informer of the Securitatea (the Romanian communist secret police), but no conclusive evidence had been produced to support this allegation. Throughout his years of exile, he had worked as an editorialist and as a collaborator for a Radio Univers as well as for Radio Free Europe and BBC. In addition, during the 1980s (for a period of time of seven years), he also worked as an editorialist for his own newspaper, entitled B.I.R.E. (i.e. Buletinul de Informație pentru Români în Exil or The Bulletin of Information for Romanians in exile). Furthermore, while still in exile, Radu Câmpeanu was the president of the Association of Former Political Detainees from Romania (Romanian: Asociația Foștilor Deținuți Politici din România) as well as a member of the Thinking and Action Liberal Club (Romanian: Clubul de Gândire și Acțiune Liberală, also known as Clubul de Acțiune și Gândire Liberală Românească, Clubul Liberal Român, or Clubul Liberal).

Câmpeanu was the first president of the contemporary National Liberal Party (PNL) whose term unfolded between 1990 and 1993, a political party he helped re-found in early January 1990, shortly after the fall of communism, as well as a Senator on behalf of the PNL between 1990 and 1992, and then once more between 2004 and 2008.

During the early 1990s, Câmpeanu served as one of the 5 vice-presidents of the Provisional National Unity Council (Romanian: Consiliul Provizoriu de Uniune Națională), also known as CPUN for short, a position which could be equated with that of state vice-president. Câmpeanu participated in the first Romanian presidential debate after 1989, alongside Ion Iliescu of the National Salvation Front (FSN) and Ion Rațiu of the Christian Democratic National Peasants' Party (PNȚCD), held on 17 May 1990. Câmpeanu subsequently came in second after Ion Iliescu in the 1990 Romanian presidential election with 1,529,188 votes or 10.64%. As a politician, according to him, he was a supporter of dialogue between people who have contrary opinions.

== Early political career and incarceration in communist Romania ==
Radu Câmpeanu was the leader of the National Liberal students' league at nationwide level before World War II. On 8 November 1945, several months after the end of World War II, Câmpeanu participated in the first street protest of the civil society (encompassing both students and workers) which were organised in Bucharest against the forcefully-established communist regime by the Soviets in the Kingdom of Romania. The respective manifestation was also one of support for King Michael I. According to Câmpeanu himself, there were between 1,200 and 1,500 students from various university centres who participated in the respective protest which was held on 8 November 1945.

Two years later, in 1947, he was incarcerated by the Securitate (as many other non- and anti-communist politicians from the historical PNL and PNȚ) and sent to forced labour for 15 years in the construction of the Danube–Black Sea Canal. Câmpeanu was freed in 1956, 6 years ahead of the planned authoritarian sentence, as part of the de-Stalinization process which the Romanian People's Republic (RPR) undertook during the late 1950s (in essence, a policy of distancing itself from Moscow's control, thereby breaking free from the USSR satellite status).

== Life in exile in France ==
On 30 July 1973, with financial help on behalf of his family from abroad (more specifically, from Switzerland and France), Câmpeanu (at that time aged 55) managed to leave communist Romania for Paris, France alongside his first wife, Monica Papadopol, and their son, Barbu. The three were ransomed in exchange for approximately 10,000 USD.

Câmpeanu remained very active amongst Romanian exiles in Western Europe up until 1990, when he returned to his home country in the wake of the Romanian Revolution of 1989. While he was away in exile in France, he would lead such anti-communist and anti-totalitarian organisations as the Community of Romanians in France (Romanian: Comunitatea românilor din Franţa), the National Romanian Council (Romanian: Consiliul Naţional Român), and the Union of Free Romanians (Romanian: Uniunea Mondială a românilor liberi). He was subsequently awarded French citizenship upon personal request, three years after his initial arrival in France, while not forfeiting his native Romanian one in the process. This later allowed him to be a member of the Union for French Democracy (UDF), a center-right and liberal political party which was presided by former French President Valéry Giscard d'Estaing.

On the occasion of an interview given in March 2010 for the Romanian documentary project "Capete Înfierbântate 13-15 iunie 1990", Câmpeanu stated that he was invited at party meetings and political debates in the Parliament of France by the Union for French Democracy as an ordinary member. Furthermore, he also stated that he was subsequently invited at political debates in the House of Commons in London, United Kingdom, thereby enjoying the overall civilised atmosphere from there.

== Return to post-1989 Romania and late political career ==
The electoral map of the final results of the 1990 Romanian presidential election: the counties coloured in blue were those in which Radu Câmpeanu won, more specifically Harghita County and Covasna County.

An electoral map of the 1990 Romanian presidential election showcasing Radu Câmpeanu's vote share nationwide. (Note: He obtained the highest electoral results in various counties across Transylvania (most notably Harghita and Covasna), in Suceava County, Bukovina, Galați County, Western Moldavia, Constanța County, Dobruja, and in the capital of Bucharest.)

Câmpeanu returned to Romania in early January 1990, right after the Romanian Revolution of December 1989. He immediately set out to re-found the National Liberal Party (PNL), alongside other former liberals who had been incarcerated by the communist authorities, such as Dan Amedeo Lăzărescu, Sorin Bottez, Ionel Săndulescu, Nicolae Enescu, and Dinu Zamfirescu.

Câmpeanu ran against Ion Iliescu in the 1990 Romanian presidential election, on behalf of the PNL while being at the same time endorsed by the Democratic Alliance of Hungarians in Romania (UDMR/RMDSZ) and the Ecologist Party of Romania (PER) respectively. He finished second with 10.64%, or 1,529,188 votes. Subsequently, he retained the honorific title of "1990 Founding President" of the party and was a member in the Central Political Bureau of the PNL up until his death in October 2016.

During the early 1990s, he was the vice-president of the Provisional Council of National Unity (Romanian: Consiliul Provizoriu de Uniune Națională) in the Parliament of Romania as well as the vice-president of the Senate between 1990 and 1992. Also, during his term as PNL president, the National Liberal Party acceded to governance in the relatively technocratic national union government led by National Salvation Front (FSN) Prime Minister Theodor Stolojan between 1991 and 1992.

After 1993, when he lost the presidency of the PNL to his older colleague Mircea Ionescu-Quintus, Câmpeanu left the party along with a group of followers to establish a splinter political party called PNL-C (Romanian: Partidul Național Liberal-Câmpeanu) which, after 10 years, would be re-integrated within the main PNL.

Additionally, in 1991, Câmpeanu withdrew the PNL from the Romanian Democratic Convention (CDR) mainly because of the CDR's integration of the UDMR and the lack of will on behalf of Câmpeanu to run on common lists along with the Hungarian minority's ethnic party for the Parliament of Romania, as later stated by Câmpeanu himself in an edition of the Milionarii de la miezul nopții (Midnight millionaires; the predecessor of Marius Tucă Show) at some point during the late 1990s. This resulted in several splinters from the PNL which would eventually join the CDR, most notably PNL-CD led by Niculae Cerveni. Other PNL splinter groups which decided to remain within the CDR were PNL-AT and PL '93.

Subsequently, Câmpeanu ran for a second time for President on 3 November 1996, when he was supported by PNL-C and the Green Alternative Ecologists' Party (Romanian: Partidul Alternativa Verde-Ecologiștii) under the official platform National Liberal Ecologist Alliance (Romanian: Alianța Național Liberală-Ecologistă). He failed to gain enough votes to enter a second round and obtained a very feeble total amount of 0.3% of all ballots cast in the first round, ranking 12th. At some point in the 1990s, Câmpeanu also proposed a possible candidacy of King Michael I for president, which was met with harsh criticism on behalf of both his fellow party colleagues and a vast amount of the electorate and civil society.

=== As leader of PNL-C between 1995 and 2003 ===
From 1995 up until 2003, Radu Câmpeanu was the leader of a splinter liberal party issued from the main PNL which was called National Liberal Party–Câmpeanu (Romanian: Partidul Național Liberal-Câmpeanu). Throughout the 1990s, PNL-C refused to be (re)integrated within the main PNL and partake in the CDR-led governance from 1996 to 2000. However, it did contest the 1996 general and local elections where it scored very modest results. More specifically, PNL-C won only 15 mayoral seats in 1996 and failed to gain any parliamentary presence as the National Liberal Ecologist Alliance (ANLE), with a very feeble electoral score of 0.79% for the Chamber of Deputies and 0.70% for the Senate respectively.

At the 2000 general election, PNL-C scored better than it did in 1996, ranking 9th with 1.22% at the Senate and 1.40% at the Chamber. Nonetheless, these results were still very modest and beneath the then parliamentarian threshold of 3%. In 2003, PNL-C merged with the main PNL and Câmpeanu was elected senator in the 2004–2008 legislature in the Romanian Parliament on behalf of the Justice and Truth Alliance (DA).

=== Post-2008 involvement within the PNL ===
After 2008, Radu Câmpeanu did not run for another term as senator but gained the position of honorary founding president of the PNL until his death in 2016. In 2012, while talking about the 2014 presidential election, Câmpeanu stated that he did not think that "Romanians will vote for Crin Antonescu" (in the hypothesis that the latter would have been the designated candidate of the party back then again), a statement which outraged then incumbent PNL leader. Furthermore, as stated by him back then, he had correctly affirmed that the Social Liberal Union (USL) will survive only as long as the peril of Băsescu's power will linger on.

=== Criticism ===
During the 1990s, Radu Câmpeanu was heavily criticised because of his subsequent closeness towards Ion Iliescu's National Salvation Front (FSN) in the Provisional Council of National Unity (CPUN) and the membership of the PNL within the Stolojan Cabinet as well as because of the withdrawal of the PNL from the Romanian Democratic Convention (CDR) prior to the 1992 Romanian general election. He was therefore seen as an instrument of the neo-communists at the time. This eventually led to his downfall as PNL president in 1993, being replaced by Mircea Ionescu-Quintus during the same year.

Additionally, Câmpeanu was criticised for proposing King Michael for president in 1992, but his majesty refused. This proved to be a major political and electoral error for the PNL as during that year's presidential election the party did not bring forth any candidate, failing also to enter the parliament, thereby scoring under the threshold of 3%.

== Family ==
Radu Câmpeanu was the son of former Dâmbovița County PNL prefect Dumitru Câmpeanu. Radu Câmpeanu is survived by one son, Barbu Câmpeanu, who is a university professor in France at École polytechnique in Palaiseau, a southern suburb of Paris.

== Publications ==
In 1995, Radu Câmpeanu published a book entitled "Cu gândul la țară" (i.e. Thinking of the country), after the electoral slogan with which he ran for president back in 1990 (during that year's Romanian presidential election). The book was edited and published by the Canadian Broadcasting Corporation (CBC) and has a total length of 144 pages.

The volume includes editorials published by him during the 1980s while in exile in Paris, France for his publication entitled B.I.R.E. (i.e. Buletinul de Informație pentru Români în Exil or The Bulletin of Information for Romanians in exile). It represents a harsh criticism towards the political establishment of the Socialist Republic of Romania (RSR), the Romanian Communist Party (PCR), and former dictator Nicolae Ceaușescu in particular. For example, one of the harshest critics that Câmpeanu described in detail regarding the illicit communist regime at that time was the poor and delayed information service of the then Romanian authorities regarding the Chernobyl disaster in 1986. On the other hand and in stark contrast, he praised and expressed solidarity for the Brașov rebellion which took place one year later in 1987 in Brașov. Câmpeanu also expressed solidarity for the Jiu Valley miners' strike of 1977 in his newspaper, B.I.R.E. Therefore, Câmpeanu perceived the communist regime as immoral, brutal, criminal, and catastrophic for Romania.

At the time of the release of "Cu gândul la țară" (namely in 1995), the Canadian Broadcasting Corporation (CBC) publishing house had another volume penned by Câmpeanu in works, announced then to be soon published, which was titled "O viață pentru România" (i.e. A life for Romania).

== Honours ==
- Romania:
  - National Order of Faithful Service, Rank of Knight (5 December 2002)

== Electoral history ==
=== Presidential elections ===
| Election | Affiliation | First round | | | Second round | | |
| Election | Affiliation | Votes | Percentage | Position | Votes | Percentage | Position |
|---|---|---|---|---|---|---|---|
| 1990 | National Liberal Party (PNL) | 1,529,188 | 10.6% | 2nd | | | |
| 1996 | National Liberal Ecologist Alliance (ANLE)^{1} | 43,780 | 0.3% | 12th | | | |

Notes:

^{1} The National Liberal Ecologist Alliance (ANLE) consisted of the National Liberal Party–Câmpeanu (PNL-C) and the Green Alternative Ecologists' Party (Romanian: Partidul Alternativa Verde-Ecologiștii, PAV-E).

== Notes ==
Party political offices
| Preceded by Party dissolved by communists | President of the National Liberal Party (1990–1993) | Succeeded by Mircea Ionescu-Quintus |
