= Snagov Declaration =

1995 declaration by political parties in Romania

The Snagov Declaration (Romanian: Declarația de la Snagov) was a declaration signed on 21 June 1995 by the leaders of the parliamentary parties in Romania at the time committing to a strategy aimed at Romania's accession to the European Union (EU). The declaration is named after Lake Snagov, as it was signed in a villa on its shore. The day after the declaration's signature, Romania submitted its official application to join the EU, entering the bloc in 2007. A similar declaration was signed in 2001 in the same location to commit to Romania's accession to NATO.

The declaration was signed by President Ion Iliescu, Prime Minister Nicolae Văcăroiu, President of the Senate Oliviu Gherman and President of the Chamber of Deputies Adrian Năstase; by party leaders Gherman and Năstase (Social Democracy Party of Romania), Petre Roman (Democratic Party), Gabriel Țepelea (Christian Democratic National Peasants' Party), Gheorghe Funar (Romanian National Unity Party), Béla Markó (Democratic Alliance of Hungarians in Romania), Corneliu Vadim Tudor (Greater Romania Party), Nicolae Manolescu (Civic Alliance Party), Ilie Verdeț (Socialist Party of Labour), Horia Rusu (Liberal Party 1993), Sergiu Cunescu (Romanian Social Democratic Party), Niculae Cerveni (Democratic Convention – National Liberal Party), Victor Surdu (Democratic Agrarian Party of Romania) and Otto Weber (Romanian Ecologist Party); and by President of the Commission for the Development of the National Strategy for the Preparation of Romania's Accession to the European Union Tudorel Postolache.

On 26 May 2024, 14 parties in Moldova, including the then ruling Party of Action and Solidarity (PAS), signed the Pact for Europe (Pactul pentru Europa), inspired by the Snagov Declaration, to commit to Moldova's accession to the EU, among other aims. Earlier, for several years, Action 2012 had been proposing a "Pact for Bessarabia" (Pactul pentru Basarabia), inspired as well by the Snagov Declaration, to commit the Romanian political class, civil society and media to the unification of Moldova and Romania.

== See also ==
- History of Romania (1989–present)
- 2007 enlargement of the European Union
