= National Liberal Party–Câmpeanu =

Political party in Romania

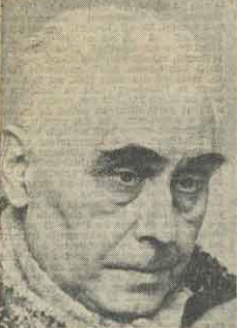
Portrait of Radu Câmpeanu in Revista 22 (January 1990). Câmpeanu was the founder and president of the party and initial PNL presidential candidate in the 1990 Romanian presidential election, coming second behind Ion Iliescu of the National Salvation Front (FSN).

National Liberal Party–Câmpeanu (Romanian: Partidul Național Liberal–Câmpeanu; PNL–C) was a national liberal, conservative liberal, and classical liberal political party in Romania which was established as a split-off from the main National Liberal Party (PNL) during the mid - 1990s by the first president of PNL after its refounding, Radu Câmpeanu, in the wake of the violent and bloody 1989 Romanian Revolution.

Radu Câmpeanu decided to leave the main PNL from several main reasons, among which, most notably, there were his presidency loss at the congress in 1993 in front of Mircea Ionescu-Quintus (yet the former was elected vice-president of the party at the same congress nevertheless) and his reluctance and opposition towards the Romanian Democratic Convention (CDR) with respect to the incorporation of the Democratic Alliance of Hungarians in Romania (UDMR/RMDSZ) on common lists for the 1992 general election.

PNL–C, the official abbreviation under which the political party was known, competed in the 1996 and 2000 Romanian general and local elections before being re-integrated in the main PNL through the process of absorption in 2003, one year before the 2004 general election. During both the late 1990s and early 2000s, the party failed to enter the parliament's afferent legislatures for those periods and consequently remained in extra-parliamentary opposition towards both the CDR and PDSR from 1996 until 2003.

== History ==
PNL–C was founded in 1993 as a splinter from the main PNL by Radu Câmpeanu along with a devoted group of national liberal followers dissatisfied with the result of the 1993 PNL presidency congress. Between the mid 1990s and late 1990s, PNL–C refused to be a part of the Romanian Democratic Convention (CDR) and remained in extra-parliamentary opposition towards both the Red Quadrilateral coalition headed by FDSN Prime Minister Nicolae Văcăroiu and the subsequent CDR-led coalition successively headed by Victor Ciorbea, Radu Vasile, and Mugur Isărescu.

PNL–C contested the 1996 Romanian general election, the 1996 Romanian local elections, the 2000 Romanian general election, and the 2000 Romanian local elections, failing nevertheless to obtain significant political scores at any of the aforementioned election rounds.

In 1996, Radu Câmpeanu ran once again for president under the National Liberal Ecologist Alliance (Romanian: Alianța Național Liberal Ecologistă; ANLE) but obtained a very feeble 0.34% share of the total ballots cast back then (or, in absolute numbers, 43,780 votes).

During the early 2000s, the party still existed but had a minor role in the national politics of Romania, in the wake of both the 2000 Romanian general election and 2000 Romanian local elections. Subsequently, in 2003, PNL–C was absorbed by the main PNL which had been led up to that point in time by Mircea Ionescu-Quintus.

== Electoral history ==
=== Presidential elections ===
Election	Candidate	Votes	%	Position
1996	Radu Câmpeanu	43,780	0.34%	12th

=== Legislative elections ===
Election	Chamber			Senate			Position	Aftermath
Election	Votes	%	Seats	Votes	%	Seats	Position	Aftermath
1996	Part of ANLE^{1}		0 / 343	Part of ANLE^{1}		0 / 143	14th	Extra-parliamentary
2000	151,518	1.40	0 / 345	133,018	1.22	0 / 140	9th	Extra-parliamentary

Notes:

^{1} ANLE stands for the National Liberal Ecologist Alliance (Romanian: Alianța Național Liberală-Ecologistă) which was composed of PNL–C alongside the Green Party (PV) which was then known as the Green Alternative Ecologists' Party (Romanian: Partidul Alternativa Verde-Ecologiștii). The ANLE obtained 86,359 votes for the Senate (or 0.70%) and 96,412 votes for the Chamber (or 0.79%) respectively.

=== Local elections ===
At the 1996 Romanian local elections, PNL–C won a very small number of only 15 mayoral mandates all across Romania. Likewise, for the 2000 Romanian local elections, PNL–C obtained modest electoral results.

== See also ==
- National Liberal Party (Republic of Moldova)
