= National Liberal Party (Romania) =

Romanian political party

National Liberal Party Partidul Național Liberal
- Abbreviation: PNL
- President: Ilie Bolojan
- First Vice President: Dan Motreanu
- General Secretary: Robert Sighiartău
- Founded: 15 January 1990; 36 years ago
- Preceded by: National Liberal Party (historical)
- Headquarters: Modrogan nr 1, Sector 1, Bucharest
- Membership (2023): c. 182,000
- Ideology: Liberal conservatism; Christian democracy; Economic liberalism
- Political position: Centre-right
- National affiliation: Alliances: Romanian Democratic Convention (1991–1992; 1993–1999); Justice and Truth Alliance (2003–2007); Centre Right Alliance (2011–2013); Social Liberal Union (2011–2014); Christian Liberal Alliance (Jul–Nov, 2014); National Coalition for Romania (2021–2025)
- European affiliation: European People's Party
- European Parliament group: European People's Party Group
- International affiliation: Centrist Democrat International; International Democracy Union
- Colours: Yellow; Blue
- Senate: 27 / 135
- Chamber of Deputies: 55 / 330
- European Parliament: 8 / 33
- Mayors: 1,248 / 3,176
- County Presidents: 17 / 41
- County Councillors: 489 / 1,340
- Local Council Councillors: 12,767 / 39,900
- Ministers: 0 / 18

Party flag

Website
- pnl.ro
- Politics of Romania; Political parties; Elections; A: re-established after the Romanian Revolution

The National Liberal Party (Romanian: Partidul Național Liberal, PNL) is a major liberal conservative and Christian democratic political party in Romania. As of early 2026, it stands as the nation's third-largest political force within the Romanian Parliament. While the modern organization was formally re-founded in January 1990, emerging in the immediate aftermath of the Revolution of 1989 and the collapse of the communist regime, it serves as the direct successor to the political party of the same name that dominated the political landscape of the Kingdom of Romania between 1875 and 1947.

Drawing upon this extensive historical legacy, the PNL frequently asserts its status as the first formally constituted political party in Romania and the oldest surviving member within the family of European liberal parties. Internationally, the party is a member of the European People's Party (EPP). Over the last two decades, the PNL has played a central role in Romanian governance, frequently leading or participating in governing coalitions and giving one of the country's post-communist presidents, Klaus Iohannis, who served from late 2014 to early 2025.

== Recent historical overview ==
Until 2014, the PNL was a member of the Alliance of Liberals and Democrats for Europe (ALDE). Following an update to its statutes in June 2014, the party's MEPs joined the EPP Group. On September 12, 2014, the PNL was admitted as a full member of the EPP and subsequently merged with the Democratic Liberal Party (PDL). Previously a member of the Liberal International (LI), the party later moved to the Centrist Democrat International (CDI).

In the 2020 elections, under the leadership of Ludovic Orban, the PNL achieved its best results since the fall of communism, securing its highest score in over 30 years across both the local and parliamentary levels and establishing itself as the dominant force in Transylvania, Banat, and Bukovina. While finishing second in the general election, the party successfully led the formation of a centre-right government. However, internal friction led to Orban being overthrown in 2021; after its initial alliance with the Save Romania Union (USR) collapsed (along with the Cîțu Cabinet), the PNL formed a grand coalition with its historical rival, the Social Democratic Party (PSD), which governed through a scheduled power rotation between Nicolae Ciucă and Marcel Ciolacu.

Following the 2024 parliamentary election, the political landscape shifted with the appointment of Ilie Bolojan (PNL) as Prime Minister in June 2025. Leading a broad pro-European coalition, Bolojan pursued a program of rigorous fiscal discipline. However, the PSD withdrew its support in April 2026, allegedly over disagreements regarding these reforms. On May 5, 2026, the government fell after a no-confidence motion initiated and supported by the PSD and the Alliance for the Union of Romanians (AUR), with additional support stemming from other members of the parliament (totalling 281 votes), leaving the PNL to lead a caretaker administration as of May 11 while negotiations for a new parliamentary majority continue.

== History ==
=== Re-establishment and first governing experiences (1990–2000) ===
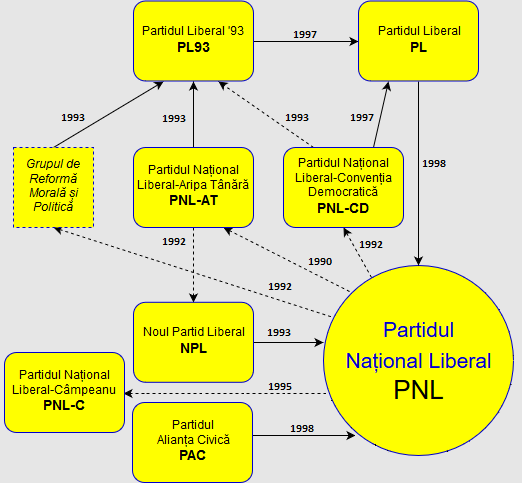
Flowchart showcasing the liberal political groups which seceded from and were subsequently integrated within the National Liberal Party during the 1990s (all with the exception of PNL-C)

The National Liberal Party (PNL) was re-established in January 1990, just days after the violent Romanian Revolution brought an end to communist rule. The process was spearheaded by a group of liberals who had survived the communist period, including many former political prisoners, or who had returned from exile. In its early years, the party was led by Radu Câmpeanu and Mircea Ionescu-Quintus, both of whom served as a living bridge to the party's pre-communist history, having been liberal youth leaders during the interwar and early post-World War II eras. This continuity allowed the PNL to reclaim its position as the direct institutional successor to the historic party founded in 1875.

At the 1990 general elections, the PNL emerged as the third-largest parliamentary force. Radu Câmpeanu finished second in the presidential race with 10.6% of the vote, trailing behind Ion Iliescu. To bolster its ranks, the party integrated the Socialist Liberal Party (PSL) in December 1990, with its leader, Niculae Cerveni, becoming a vice-president of the PNL.

Shortly thereafter, at the behest of and primarily alongside the Christian Democratic National Peasants' Party (PNȚCD), and supported by smaller center-right parties and NGOs, the PNL helped form the Romanian Democratic Convention (CDR). This alliance sought to establish a robust collective opposition and a governing alternative to the ruling National Salvation Front (FSN), which was widely viewed as the institutional successor to the Romanian Communist Party (PCR). However, prior to the 1992 general elections, Câmpeanu withdrew the PNL from the CDR to compete as a standalone force. A primary catalyst for this exit was Câmpeanu's refusal to run on unified electoral lists with the Democratic Union of Hungarians in Romania (UDMR/RMDSZ).

This ultimately proved to be a major strategic error; the PNL failed to surpass the electoral threshold required for parliamentary representation and was consequently relegated to extra-parliamentary opposition for the 1992–1996 term. Furthermore, this decision triggered a wave of fragmentation within the liberal movement. Several splinter factions broke away from the main party: some opted to remain within the CDR, while others followed Câmpeanu into a new entity titled PNL-C (Romanian: Partidul Național Liberal-Câmpeanu). The primary factions that defected to align with the CDR included PNL-CD (led by Niculae Cerveni), PNL-AT, and PL '93. Other minor liberal parties, such as the PAC and UFD (which would eventually merge into the main PNL) also maintained their presence within the CDR throughout the late 1990s.

Following a leadership change that saw Mircea Ionescu-Quintus elected as the new party president in 1995, the PNL contested the 1996 general election as a reinstated member of the CDR. These elections marked the first peaceful transition of power in post-1989 Romania; the PNL joined the PNȚCD, the Democratic Party (PD), and the UDMR/RMDSZ in forming a broad governing coalition. This alliance successfully relegated the PDSR (the successor to the FSN and FDSN) to the opposition for the 1996–2000 term. Additionally, the presidency was secured by the CDR's joint candidate, Emil Constantinescu, who received the unified endorsement of all the alliance's constituent groups, including the various liberal factions then under the PNL umbrella.

=== Opposition and second governing experiences (2000–2010) ===
Between 1996 and 2000, the governing CDR coalition was hampered by a lack of political coherence and frequent cabinet reshuffles. In response to this instability, the PNL once again decided to withdraw from the alliance shortly before the 2000 general election, opting to compete as an independent force. While the party successfully maintained its parliamentary presence, finishing fourth in the legislative races and third in the presidential election, it failed to secure a place in a center-right government. This period also saw another internal schism: a splinter group founded by Dan Amedeo Lăzărescu and led by Decebal Traian Remeș, known as PNL-T (Romanian: PNL Tradițional), broke away to remain within the 'CDR 2000' alliance, endorsing Mugur Isărescu for the presidency.

Consequently, in early 2003, the PNL joined forces with the Democratic Party (PD) to form the Justice and Truth Alliance (D.A.). This coalition was designed as a powerful center-right alternative to the ruling PSD (formerly PDSR) ahead of the 2004 general election. The alliance achieved significant success, finishing second in the popular vote for Parliament and securing the presidency through their joint candidate, Traian Băsescu. Following the elections, the D.A. Alliance successfully formed a center-right cabinet, marking the PNL's return to the executive and inaugurating a period of significant liberal influence in Romanian governance.

Until April 2007, the PNL served as the senior partner within the governing Justice and Truth (D.A.) Alliance, which commanded a parliamentary majority through a broader coalition with the Democratic Party (PD), the Conservative Party (PC), and the UDMR/RMDSZ. However, the relationship between the PNL and PD deteriorated, culminating in April 2007 when Prime Minister and PNL President Călin Popescu-Tăriceanu ousted the PD ministers from the cabinet. He subsequently formed a minority government alongside the UDMR/RMDSZ, supported externally by the PSD. This maneuver triggered significant internal dissent and led to a major scission: a splinter group led by Theodor Stolojan broke away to form the Liberal Democratic Party (PLD). The PLD eventually merged with the PD to create the Democratic Liberal Party (PDL), effectively splitting the liberal electorate between two rival camps.

Following the 2008 legislative election, the PNL placed third and entered official opposition, holding 19.74% of parliamentary seats. They were eclipsed by a new 'grand coalition' formed between their former allies, the Democratic Liberal Party (PDL), and the Social Democratic Party (PSD), which together commanded roughly 70% of the legislature. At the 2009 presidential election, the PNL's newly elected leader, Crin Antonescu, finished third in the first round. Despite this significant electoral showing, the party remained in parliamentary opposition for the next three years, eventually returning to power in mid-2012 following the formation and accession of the Social Liberal Union (USL).

During this period, Klaus Iohannis, then serving solely as the president of the FDGR/DFDR, emerged as a central political figure. He was twice nominated for the premiership by the PNL in 2009, receiving the backing of a powerful opposition bloc that included the PSD and the PC. Despite this broad parliamentary support, his nomination was twice rejected by President Traian Băsescu. This impasse proved to be a critical precursor to the formal cooperation between the liberals and social democrats, while simultaneously elevating Iohannis's profile as a major national alternative to the incumbent administration.

=== Transition from USL to ACL and third governing experiences (2010–2020) ===
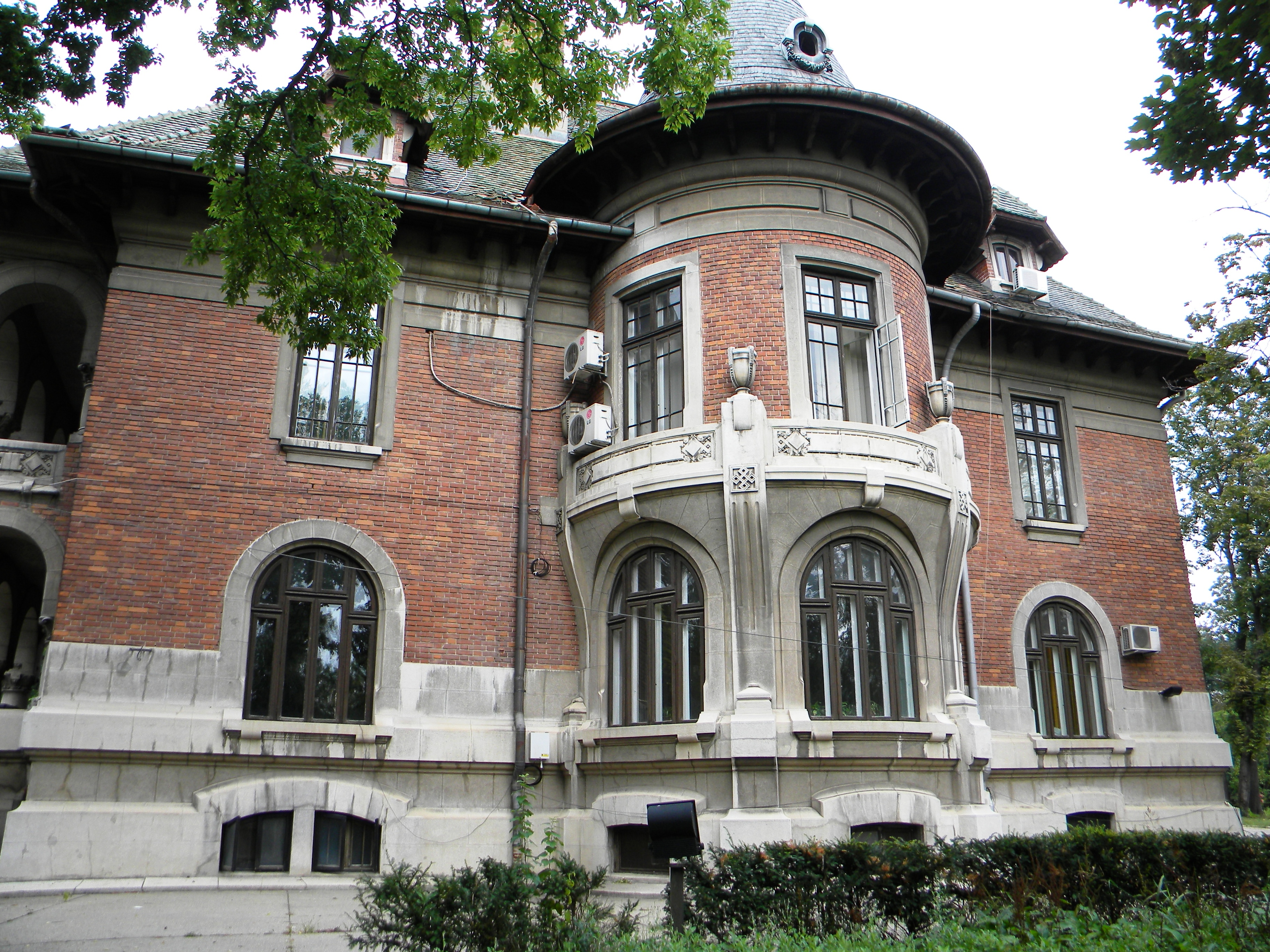
Central headquarters of the PNL located on Modrogan Alley, Bucharest (September 2014)

On 5 February 2011, the PNL formed the Social Liberal Union (USL), a major political alliance with the PSD, the Conservative Party (PC), and the National Union for the Progress of Romania (UNPR). This partnership lasted until 25 February 2014, when the PNL officially exited the USL, leading to the alliance's dissolution and the party's return to the opposition. Following the 2014 European elections, PNL President Crin Antonescu announced a significant ideological shift, seeking membership for the party within the European People's Party (EPP). Consequently, at the start of the 8th European Parliament, the majority of PNL MEPs joined the EPP Group, though one remained with ALDE Group as an independent. By late May 2014, the PNL agreed to a merger with the Democratic Liberal Party (PDL); their immediate strategic objective was to field a joint candidate for the upcoming presidential election under the banner of the Christian Liberal Alliance (ACL).

On 27 June 2014, former PNL Chairman Călin Popescu-Tăriceanu announced his intention to establish a separate liberal party to contest the presidency, citing his opposition to the impending merger with the PDL. This breakaway faction, named the Liberal Reformist Party (PLR), was officially founded on 3 July 2014. Meanwhile, the unification process continued; on 17 July 2014, it was confirmed that the merged entity would retain the National Liberal Party (PNL) name while relocating to the PDL's Bucharest headquarters. The merger was formally ratified on 26 July 2014 during a joint party congress, with the legal registration of the 'New PNL' finalized by the end of the year.

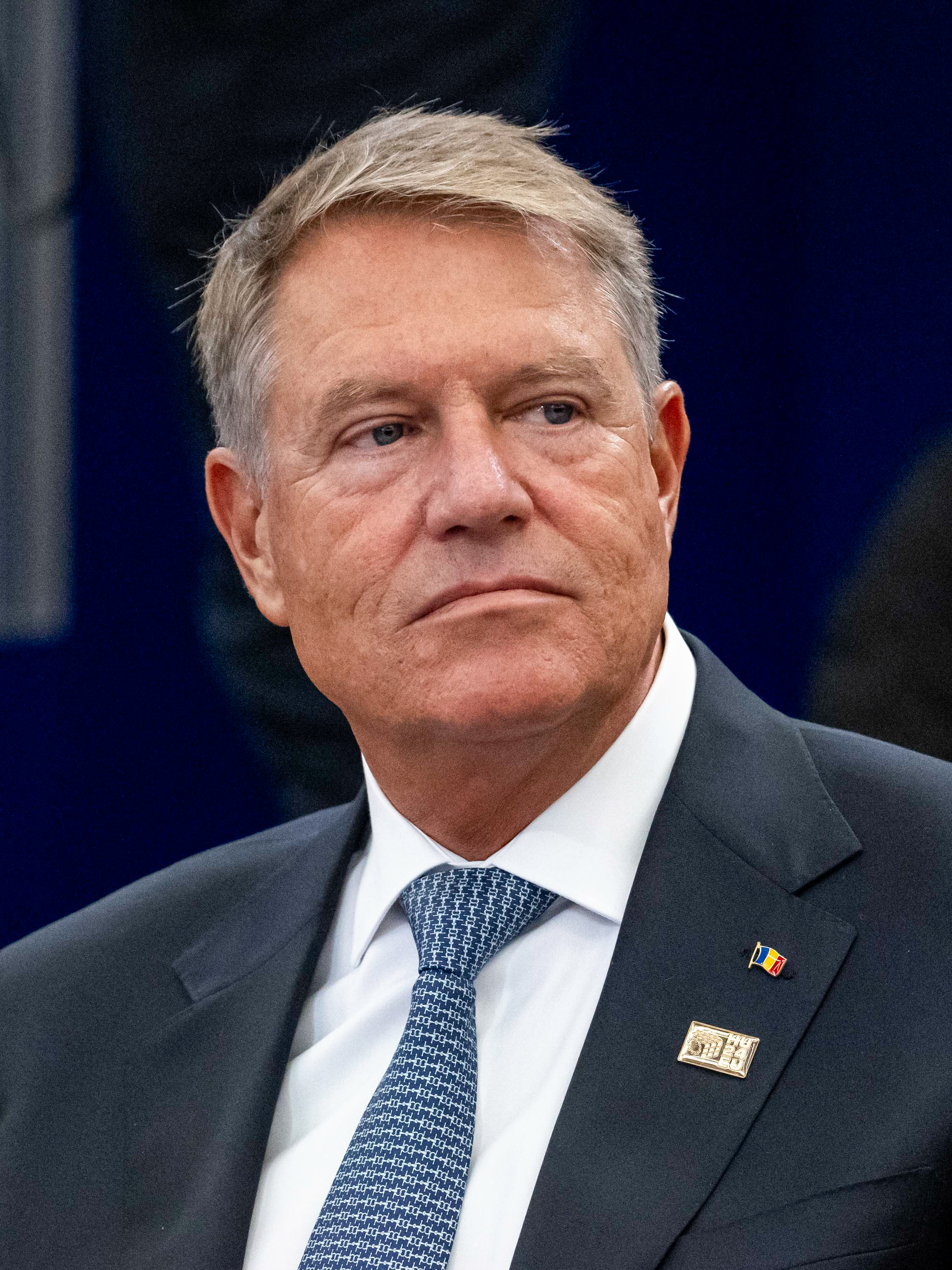
Klaus Iohannis, the 4th President of post-communist Romania

In the first round of the 2014 presidential election, held on 2 November, the ACL candidate Klaus Iohannis, then PNL President and Mayor of Sibiu, finished as the runner-up. However, in a major political upset during the runoff on 16 November, Iohannis secured the presidency with 54.5% of the vote. Despite this executive victory, the party faced significant challenges in the 2016 local and legislative elections, finishing second behind the PSD. As a result, the PNL remained in opposition for the next three years, eventually regaining executive power in late 2019 following the collapse of the Dăncilă Cabinet.

In anticipation of the 2019 presidential election, the PNL formalized its strategy as early as March 2018, officially endorsing incumbent Klaus Iohannis for a second term. Simultaneously, the party designated its then-president, Ludovic Orban, as the official candidate for Prime Minister should the PNL prevail in the 2020 legislative elections. This dual-track leadership was cemented in June 2018 when Iohannis, during a press conference in his hometown of Sibiu, publicly confirmed his intention to seek re-election. This early mobilization allowed the PNL to present a unified front against the ruling PSD, linking the presidency and the prospective premiership in a single political platform.

Throughout 2019, the PNL expanded its ranks by absorbing two minor parties: the National Democratic Party (PND), led by Daniel Fenechiu, and PACT, led by Sebastian Burduja. By late 2019, the National Liberal Party returned to power, forming a minority standalone government under Ludovic Orban. This cabinet secured parliamentary approval twice, sustained primarily through 'confidence and supply' agreements with the USR, the PMP, and various ethnic minority parties, most notably the FDGR/DFDR. At national level, the Orban administration was immediately defined by its efforts to navigate two unprecedented crises: the COVID-19 pandemic and the resulting economic recession.

=== Brief alliance with USR PLUS and fourth governing experiences (2020–present) ===
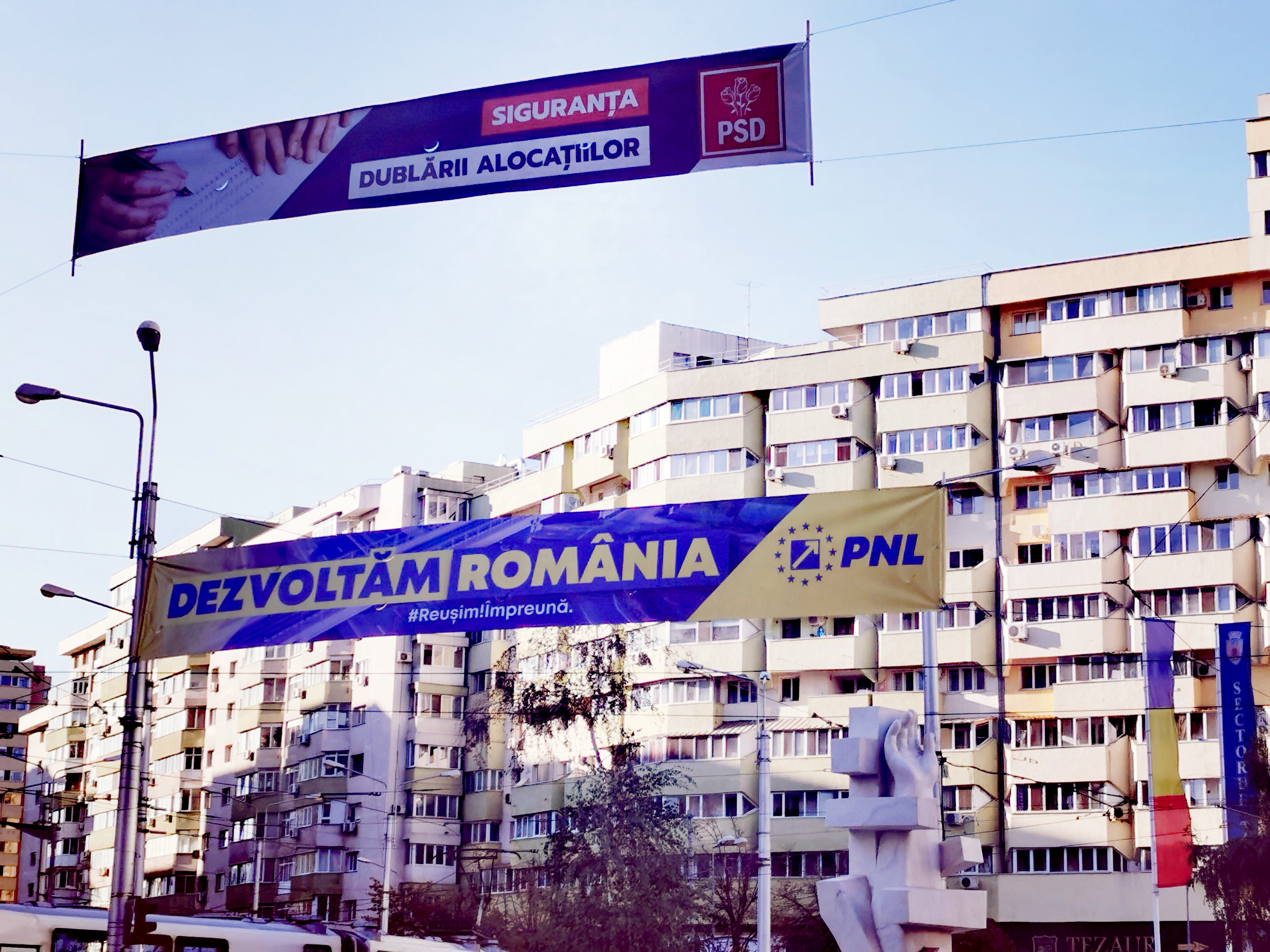
Electoral banner of the PNL (bottom) for the 2020 Romanian legislative election displayed in Bucharest (November 2020). The Romanian caption translates to: 'We develop Romania #Succeeding! Together'.

The PNL entered several electoral alliances with the 2020 USR-PLUS Alliance for the 2020 local elections, most notably by endorsing Nicușor Dan, the successful independent candidate for General Mayor of Bucharest. Alongside this victory, the PNL secured multiple sector mayorships in the capital and numerous municipalities across the country. Shortly thereafter, the party established local administrative alliances with partners including USR PLUS, the PMP, the FDGR/DFDR, the UDMR/RMDSZ, and the PNȚCD. Following the 2020 legislative elections, the PNL formalized its national strategy by forming a center-right coalition government with USR PLUS and the UDMR/RMDSZ, aiming to provide a stable governing framework for the four-year term.

In the immediate aftermath of the elections in early December 2020, incumbent party president Ludovic Orban stepped down as Prime Minister. Nicolae Ciucă was subsequently appointed to serve in an acting capacity until the new coalition could secure a formal vote of confidence. The PNL then put forward Florin Cîțu, who had served as Minister of Public Finance in both Orban cabinets, as the nominee for Prime Minister. On 23 December 2020, the Cîțu Cabinet officially took office after receiving a decisive confidence vote in Parliament, with 260 votes in favor and 186 against.

As the new year unfolded, the PNL announced a national congress for 25 September 2021, convening 5,000 delegates to determine the party's leadership at every level nationwide. At this summit, incumbent president Ludovic Orban faced a challenge from Prime Minister Florin Cîțu for control of the party's future; although rumors suggested former Minister of Agriculture Dan Motreanu might also run, he ultimately declined to move forward with a candidacy. While Orban remained the official president leading up to the vote, the escalating power struggle between the two rival camps significantly hindered the government's legislative pace, effectively stalling the implementation of key reforms.

==== 2021 governmental crisis ====
In early September 2021, the governing coalition collapsed after USR PLUS withdrew its ministers from the Cîțu Cabinet. The exit was prompted by Prime Minister Florin Cîțu's dismissal of the Minister of Justice, a move USR PLUS characterized as a provocation. The party subsequently entered the opposition, declaring Cîțu responsible for a major governmental crisis and pledging to support any motion of no confidence against him.

Central to the dispute was the "Anghel Saligny" (PNDL 3) investment program, a 50 billion lei ($12 billion) infrastructure scheme. Cîțu defended the project as essential for rural modernization, accusing the Justice Ministry of obstructionism. Conversely, USR PLUS alleged the program was a vehicle for public procurement fraud designed to "bribe" local PNL mayors, referred to in press reports as "local barons", for their support in the upcoming party congress.

Despite losing its parliamentary majority, the PNL maintained a minority government alongside the UDMR/RMDSZ. An initial motion of no confidence filed by USR PLUS and AUR was stalled through parliamentary boycotts which were facilitated by both the PSD and UDMR/RMDSZ. During this period of instability, the Prime Minister faced significant public backlash, particularly regarding social media content where he was portrayed as "Superman". This drew widespread mockery and prompted Ludovic Orban to suggest that the Prime Minister required a psychiatric consultation. In late September, the National Anticorruption Directorate (DNA) opened a criminal investigation into allegations of abuse of office regarding Cîțu's actions.

The crisis resulted in a broader political realignment as President Klaus Iohannis maintained his firm endorsement of Cîțu, while Orban warned that relying on the tacit support of the PSD would be catastrophic for the party's future. At the local level, the PNL lost several former allies as PMP shifted toward center-left alliances in various counties, and most local-level partnerships between the PNL and USR PLUS dissolved. The prolonged instability had immediate economic repercussions, with the National Bank of Romania (BNR) reporting a steady depreciation of the leu against the Euro and US Dollar, while Bloomberg noted that inflation had reached a three-year high by early September 2021.

===== Leadership under Florin Cîțu (September 2021–April 2022) =====
On 25 September 2021, Florin Cîțu was elected the 10th post-1989 president of the PNL, defeating incumbent Ludovic Orban. While the congress was marred by allegations of voting irregularities from the Orban camp, Orban subsequently declared the end of his partnership with President Klaus Iohannis and resigned as President of the Chamber of Deputies. Despite Cîțu's victory, political analysts labeled it a "Pyrrhic victory," as the government faced an imminent collapse following USR PLUS's exit and the Social Democratic Party's (PSD) stated intent to support a motion of no confidence.

On 5 October 2021, the Cîțu Cabinet was ousted by a record-breaking 281 votes in Parliament, the largest margin for a no-confidence motion in Romania's post-1989 history. While Cîțu remained as acting, his approval ratings plummeted, reportedly reaching a low of 7% by late October. During this period of transition, the National Recovery and Resilience Plan (PNRR, part of the Next Generation EU package) was officially adopted by the European Commission, a project largely negotiated by the outgoing USR PLUS ministers.

Following the government's dismissal, President Klaus Iohannis nominated Dacian Cioloș to form a new cabinet, but the proposal was rejected by Parliament. Iohannis subsequently nominated then-acting Prime Minister Nicolae Ciucă for the premiership. This period marked a fundamental shift in PNL strategy; despite Cîțu's previous claims that a coalition with the PSD was a "major compromise", the party entered negotiations to form the National Coalition for Romania (CNR) — a grand coalition with their traditional rivals, the PSD. Following the successful formation of this coalition, Ciucă was confirmed as Prime Minister by Parliament on 25 November 2021. This realignment triggered a formal schism within the PNL; on 23 November 2021, Ludovic Orban officially resigned from the party along with 16 other MPs to found the Force of the Right (FD).

Cîțu's tenure as party president remained unstable as the PNL sought to absorb smaller parties like ALDE and PMP to consolidate its position within the new grand coalition. However, internal pressure continued to mount, leading to Florin Cîțu's resignation as PNL president on 2 April 2022. He was succeeded on an interim basis by Gheorghe Flutur until a new congress was convened on 10 April 2022 to formalize the leadership of Nicolae Ciucă.

===== Leadership under Nicolae Ciucă (April 2022–November 2024) =====
On 10 April 2022, at an extraordinary party congress, Nicolae Ciucă was elected the 11th post-1989 president of the PNL, receiving 1,060 votes out of 1,120 cast. His election marked the first time a military leader held the party's presidency. Ciucă's primary objective was to maintain the stability of the National Coalition for Romania (CNR) grand coalition until the conclusion of his term as prime minister in June 2023. Following the governmental rotation, the PNL maintained the CNR coalition solely with the Social Democratic Party (PSD), removing the UDMR/RMDSZ from the executive. However, the coalition retained a parliamentary majority by maintaining a confidence and supply agreement with the political group of national minorities to endorse the former Ciolacu I cabinet.

Under Ciucă's leadership, the government's foreign policy was dominated by the Russo-Ukrainian War, with the administration expressing grave concern and aligning closely with NATO and EU responses. On the domestic front, Romania faced accusations of democratic backsliding. The Economist ranked the country last in the European Union in its democracy index, placing it behind Viktor Orbán's Hungary.

The tenures of both Ciucă and his predecessor, Florin Cîțu, were marked by significant internal fragmentation; numerous MPs and local officials departed the party to form splinter organizations. By early 2024, opinion polls indicated a significant decline in the PNL's electoral support ahead of the parliamentary elections.

==== Leadership under Bolojan (2024–present) ====
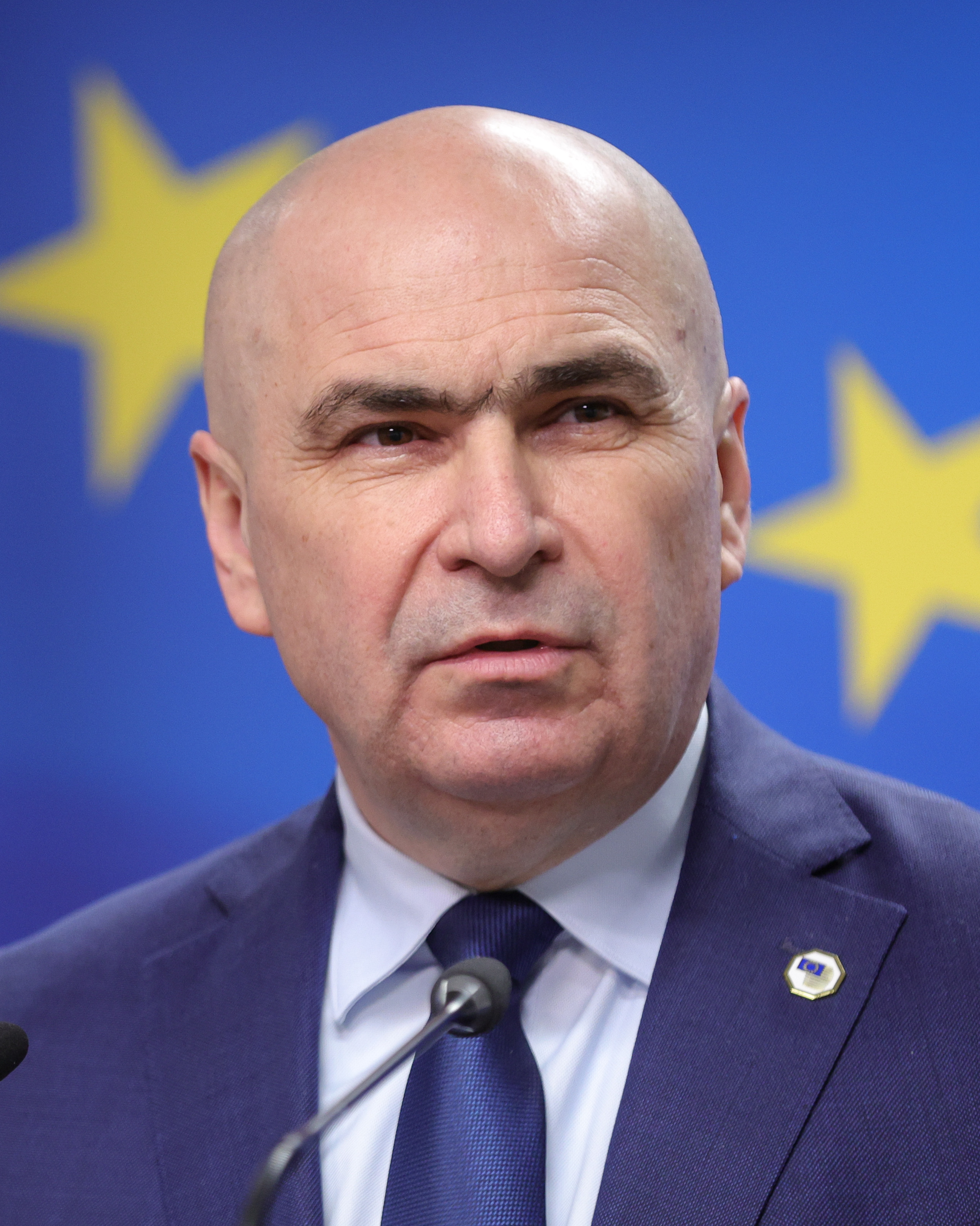
Ilie Bolojan, the current leader of PNL

Following the National Liberal Party's poor performance in the first round of the subsequently annulled 2024 Romanian presidential election, and the resulting resignation of Nicolae Ciucă, Ilie Bolojan assumed the role of the party's acting president on 25 November 2024. Shortly thereafter, on 23 December 2024, he was elected President of the Senate.

The early part of his leadership was defined by significant institutional upheaval. On 12 February 2025, Bolojan assumed the role of acting President of Romania following the resignation of incumbent Klaus Iohannis. In accordance with the Romanian Constitution, his duties as President of the Senate were suspended during this interim presidency. Bolojan served as the acting head of state until 26 May 2025, overseeing the transition to the administration of Nicușor Dan. Following the conclusion of his interim mandate, Bolojan was appointed Prime Minister of Romania on 23 June 2025.

== Scissions and mergers ==
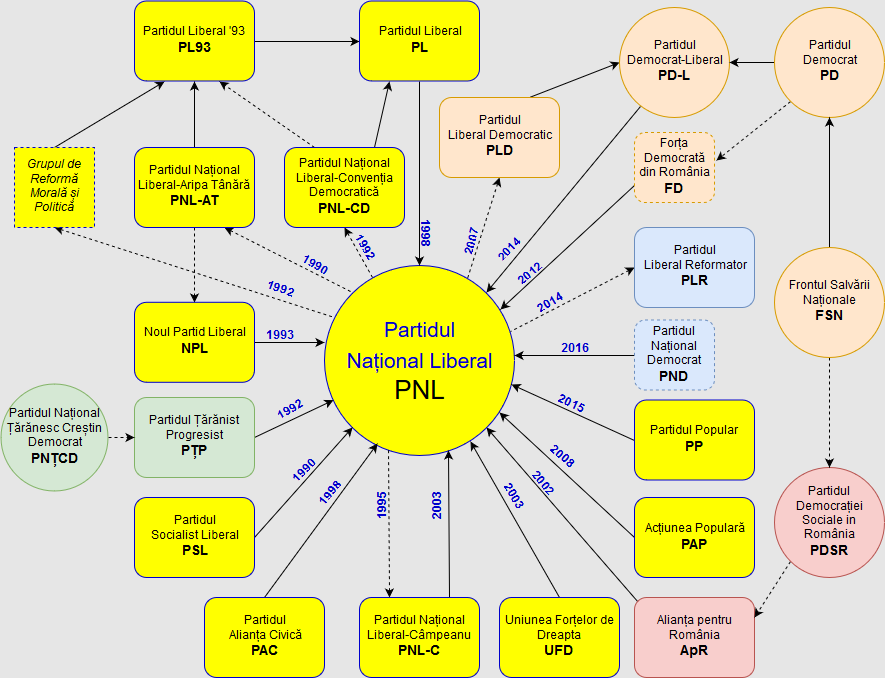
Diagram showcasing the political evolution of the National Liberal Party (PNL), from 1990 until 2016.

=== Parties seceded from PNL ===
- National Liberal Party - Youth Wing (1990);
- National Liberal Party - Democratic Convention (1991);
- National Liberal Party–Câmpeanu (1995);
- Liberal Democratic Party (2006);
- Liberal Reformist Party (2014);
- Liberal Right Party (2019);
- Force of the Right (2021);
- Liberal Conservative Platform (2022);
- Hope's Movement (2023).

=== Parties absorbed by PNL ===
- Socialist Liberal Party (1990);
- Progressive Peasant Party (1993);
- New Liberal Party (1993);
- Liberal Party '93/Liberal Party (1998);
- Civic Alliance Party (1998);
- Alliance for Romania (2002);
- Union of Right-wing Forces (2003);
- National Liberal Party–Câmpeanu (2003);
- People's Action (2008);
- Democratic Force (2012);
- Democratic Liberal Party (2014);
- Popular Party (2015);
- National Democratic Party (2019);
- Youth Civic Action Platform (2019);
- Alliance of Liberals and Democrats (2022);
- Hope's Movement (2024);
- Liberal Right Party (2024)
- Force of the Right (2026, expected).

== Ideology ==
The party had officially adhered to conservative liberalism and liberal conservatism before becoming simply conservative since 2021. In recent years, it has focused more on economic liberalism and a shift to a more catch all platform. The National Liberal Party (PNL) also advocates for conservative initiatives and policies and the state in moral and religious issues, as well as the privatisation and denationalisation of the economy, a trend which is currently taking place quite rapidly in Romania, as in other post-communist economies in Central and Eastern Europe. Unlike its Western counterparts, the party is more nationalist and traditionalist on social issues, such as LGBT rights.

The party has factions of adherence to Christian democracy, ethnic nationalism, neoliberalism, and social conservatism. The party has also been described as populist, while former president Florin Cîțu rejects this qualification. However, after joining the European People's Party (EPP) and especially under Cîțu and Ciucă's leadership, the party became more conservative, Radio Free Europe calling it "liberal only in the name". PNL opposes same-sex marriage as well as civil unions.

In economic regards, it favours lowering taxes and expanding the private sector of the national economy through a series of new laws in order to generate more value. It also advocates a decentralisation of Romania's political structure, with greater autonomy given to the eight development regions. However, under Ciucă's rule, the party also shifted more from a liberal-oriented economy towards economic patriotism. Former opposition leader Cătălin Drulă, former president of the Save Romania Union (USR), accused the party of being statist.

Some policies of the PNL Prime Ministers of Romania, such as Florin Cîțu or Ilie Bolojan, have been described as right-libertarian, while some Romanian right-libertarian figures, such as journalist Mircea Marian, described them as "not libertarian enough". Under Bolojan's leadership, the party explicitly advocated for minarchism.

== Organization and Structure ==
The National Liberal Party operates through a hierarchical system of national and local bodies defined by its statute, most recently updated to reflect a more streamlined, executive-heavy leadership model. These organs manage the party's political strategy, internal discipline, and administrative logistics.

=== National Leading Organs ===
The Congress (Romanian: Congresul): The supreme authority of the party, the Congress (or General Assembly) meets every four years or in extraordinary circumstances. It is responsible for electing the Party President, the 4 First Vice-presidents, the 8 Regional Vice-presidents, and the 15 functional vice-presidents of the National Political Bureau.

The National Council (CN) (Romanian: Consiliul Naţional): Serving as the primary forum for debate between Congresses, the Council meets at least twice a year. Its key functions include adopting the party's governing program and officially nominating the PNL candidate for the Romanian Presidency.

The National Political Bureau (BPN) (Romanian: Biroul Politic Național): This is a broad leadership body that approves major political alliances and evaluates the performance of territorial branches. It is composed of the national leadership and the presidents of the county branches.

The Executive Bureau (BEx) (Romanian: Biroul Executiv): This is the operative leadership core responsible for the party's day-to-day political decisions and tactical management. It consists of the President, First Vice-presidents, the Secretary-General, and the Regional Vice-presidents.

The Secretary-General: This office oversees the communication between central organisms and territorial branches, manages party assets, and handles the administrative information system.

=== Auxiliary Organizations ===
The PNL maintains several specialized organizations designed to engage specific social and demographic groups:

National Liberal Youth (TNL): Coordinates activities for members under the age of 35.

Liberal Women Organization (OFL): Focuses on policies regarding gender equality and the representation of women in politics.

League of the Local Elected Officeholders (LAL): A specialized body that coordinates the activity of PNL mayors, county council presidents, and local councillors.

Liberal Student Clubs (CSL): Promotes liberal ideology within higher education institutions.

=== Local Structure ===
The party is decentralized into territorial branches, typically corresponding to Romania's 41 counties and the Municipality of Bucharest. Each branch maintains its own General Assembly and Standing Bureau. Under the 2025 reforms, these branches are grouped under 8 Development Regions, each overseen by a Regional Vice-president to ensure better coordination between the national executive and local administrations.

== Symbol ==
Romanian law requires all parties to present a permanent sign and a permanent electoral sign. The former is used to identify the party's buildings and press releases, and the latter to identify the party's electoral materials and the candidates on the elections ballot. Usually they differ slightly.

The main element of the party is a blue arrow pointing to the upper right corner of a yellow square, and the letters P, N, and L in blue, tilted to the right. The position of the PNL with respect to the arrow depends on the type of symbol, as shown below.

Current and official PNL logo as well as electoral sign (in use from 2014–present)

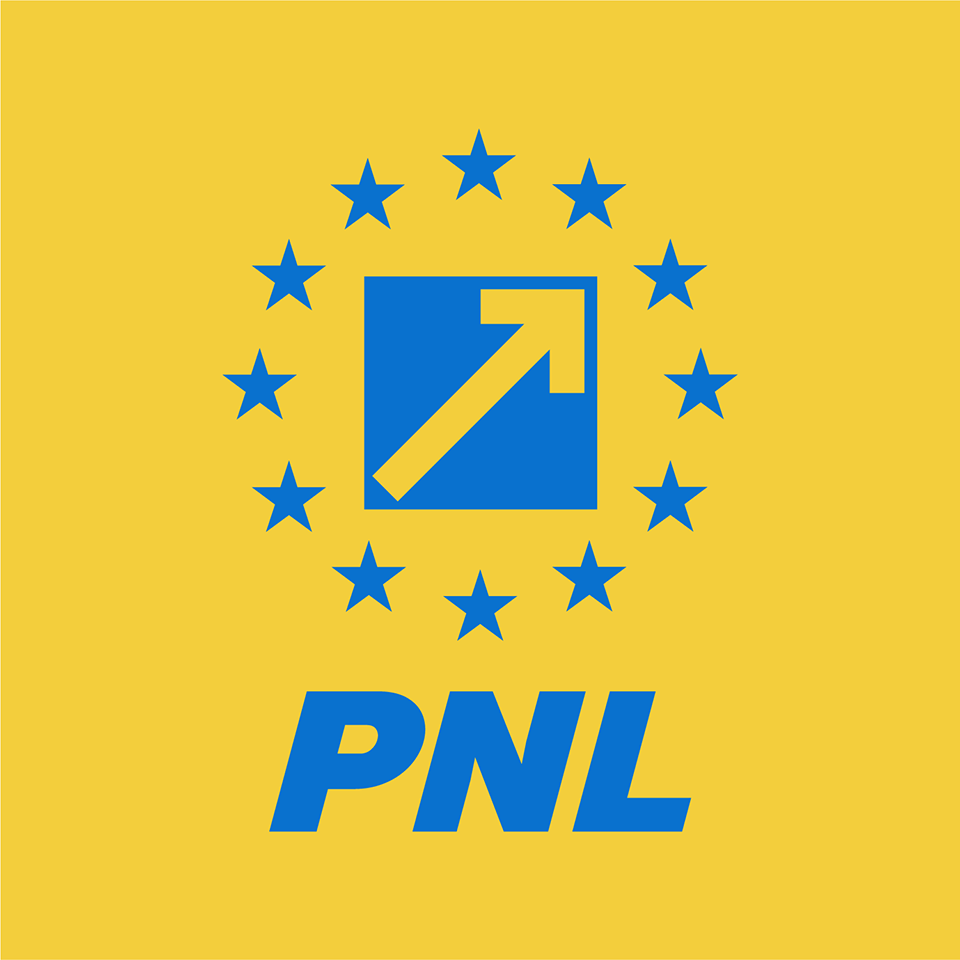
Alternative official PNL logo with the inverted colours (in use for electoral campaigns from 2018–present)

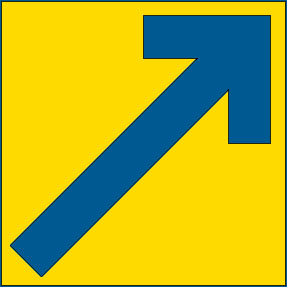
The former electoral sign (used prior to 2014)

Former permanent sign (used prior to 2014)

The flag of PNL (currently still in use)

== Leadership ==
Nº	Name Born - Died	Portrait	Term start	Term end	Duration	Other offices held
1	Radu Câmpeanu^{1} (1922–2016)		15 January 1990	28 February 1993	3 years, 1 month and 13 days	Also served as vice-president of the Provisional Council of National Unity
2	Mircea Ionescu-Quintus^{2} (1917–2017)		28 February 1993	18 February 2001	7 years, 11 months and 21 days	Also served as President of the Senate
3	Valeriu Stoica (1953–		18 February 2001	24 August 2002	1 year, 6 months and 6 days	
4	Theodor Stolojan (1943–		24 August 2002	2 October 2004	2 years, 1 month and 8 days	Also served as Prime Minister
5	Călin Popescu-Tăriceanu^{3} (1952–		2 October 2004	20 March 2009	4 years, 5 months and 18 days	Also served as Prime Minister
6	Crin Antonescu (1959–		20 March 2009	2 June 2014	5 years, 2 months and 13 days	Also served as ad interim (i.e. acting) President, and President of the Senate
7	Klaus Iohannis (1959–		28 June 2014	18 December 2014	6 months and 16 days	Also served as President
8	Vasile Blaga^{4} (1956–		18 December 2014	28 September 2016	1 year, 9 months and 10 days	
8	Alina Gorghiu^{5} (1978–		18 December 2014	12 December 2016	1 year, 11 months and 24 days	
—	Raluca Turcan (acting) (1976–		13 December 2016	17 June 2017	6 months and 4 days	
9	Ludovic Orban (1963–		17 June 2017	25 September 2021	4 years, 3 months and 8 days	Also served as Prime Minister, and President of the Chamber of Deputies
10	Florin Cîțu (1972–		25 September 2021	2 April 2022	6 months and 8 days	Also served as Prime Minister, and President of the Senate
—	Gheorghe Flutur (acting) (1960–		2 April 2022	10 April 2022	8 days	
11	Nicolae Ciucă^{6} (1967–		10 April 2022	25 November 2024	2 years, 7 months and 15 days	Also served as Prime Minister, and President of the Senate
—	Ilie Bolojan^{7} (acting) (1969–		25 November 2024	12 February 2025	2 months and 18 days	Currently serving as Prime Minister; also served as Bihor County council President, President of the Senate and as ad interim (i.e. acting) President
—	Cătălin Predoiu (acting) (1968–		12 February 2025	26 May 2025	3 months and 14 days	
—	Ilie Bolojan^{7} (acting) (1969–		26 May 2025	12 July 2025	1 month and 16 days	
12	Ilie Bolojan^{7} (1969–		12 July 2025	Incumbent	1 year, 4 months and 8 days	

Notes:

^{1} Câmpeanu had also subsequently served as Honorary Founding President of the party until his death.
^{2} Ionescu-Quintus had also subsequently served as Honorary President of the party, after the death of Câmpeanu in 2016.
^{3} Popescu-Tăriceanu had also subsequently served as Senate President between 2014 and 2019, firstly as independent (shortly after he left the PNL with a group of followers), then on behalf of the Liberal Reformist Party (PLR), and finally on behalf of the Alliance of Liberals and Democrats (ALDE), both political parties being PNL splinters (either in their entirety or in part).
^{4} Co-president along with Alina Gorghiu until 28 September 2016, when he resigned from this position.
He had previously served as President of the Senate during his tenure with the Democratic Liberal Party (PDL).
^{5} Co-president along with Vasile Blaga until 28 September 2016. Afterwards, sole party leader until the end of her term.
Additionally, she had served as acting/ad interim President of the Senate between mid-2022 and mid-2023.
^{6} Ciucă became the first career military officer to lead the party in the PNL's entire history.
^{7} Bolojan had also served as Senate President between 23 December 2024 and 12 February 2025, when he was instated as acting President after the resignation of former President Iohannis.

== Notable members ==
=== Current notable members ===
- Dinu Zamfirescu, one of the 12 founding members of the PNL in January 1990, former BBC reporter, and human rights activist;
- I.V. Săndulescu, one of the 12 founding members of the PNL in January 1990;
- Florin Cîțu, former party president between 25 September 2021 and 2 April 2022, former prime minister between December 2020 and October 2021 (acting between October and November 2021), and former Minister of Public Finance between 2019 and 2020;
- Nicolae Ciucă, current prime minister since 25 November 2021, former Minister of National Defence, and former acting prime minister in December 2020;
- Emil Boc, Mayor of Cluj-Napoca, former prime minister of Romania (2008–2012);
- Cătălin Predoiu, current and former Minister of Justice and acting Prime Minister of Romania (2012);
- Leonard Orban, economist, former European Commissioner on multilingualism;
- Crin Antonescu, former party president between 2009 and 2014, former Minister of Youth and Sports, President of the Senate and Acting President of Romania (July–August 2012);
- Vasile Blaga, former co-president of the party between 2014 and 2016, former President of the Senate of Romania between 2011 and 2012;
- Alina Gorghiu, lawyer, former co-president of the party (2014–2016), member of Chamber of Deputies (2008–2016) and former member of the Parliamentary Assembly of the Council of Europe, currently senator of Timiș;
- Nicolae Robu, the Mayor of Timișoara between 2012 and 2020, former senator in Romanian Parliament (2008–2012), member of the Central Bureau and the National Executive Council of the party and former rector of the Politechnic Institute of Timișoara (2004–2012), currently university professor;
- Mircea Hava, former mayor of Alba Iulia and current MEP since 2019;
- Gheorghe Falcă, former mayor of Arad and current MEP since 2019;
- Raluca Turcan, former acting president of the party in 2017;
- Theodor Stolojan, former president of the party between 2002 and 2004, former prime minister of Romania (1991–1992), and MEP;
- Andrei Chiliman, former mayor of Sector 1 in Bucharest;
- Crin Halaicu, former Mayor of Bucharest (1992–1996) and businessman;
- Gheorghe Flutur, former ad interim/acting president of the party, current President of the Suceava County Council, and former Minister of Agriculture;
- Teodor Atanasiu, former Minister of National Defence;
- Eugen Nicolăescu, former Minister of Health;
- Daniel Dăianu, MEP, former Minister of Finance, and member of the Romanian Academy;
- Siegfried Mureșan, MEP, spokesman and vice-president of the European People's Party;
- Andrei Marga, former Minister of Education, Minister of External Affairs and rector of the Babeș-Bolyai University;
- Hermann Fabini, architect, art historian, and former senator;
- Ion Lungu, current mayor of Suceava since 2004;
- Roberta Anastase, former President of the Chamber of Deputies of Romania (2008–2012);
- Adrian Cioroianu, former Minister of Foreign Affairs, historian and journalist;
- Ovidiu Raețchi, political analyst;
- Adriana Săftoiu, spokeswoman and political advisor;
- Sorin Cîmpeanu, former Minister of National Education;
- Ligia Deca, current Minister of National Education;
- Daniel Constantin, former Deputy Prime Minister of Romania, former Minister of Environment, and former Minister of Agriculture and Rural Development.

=== Former notable members ===
- Klaus Iohannis, 5th President of Romania;
- Ludovic Orban, former party president and former prime minister of Romania between 2019 and 2020, former Minister of Transport between 2007 and 2008;
- Eduard Hellvig, Member of the European Parliament and current Director of the Romanian Intelligence Service (SRI);
- Mihai Răzvan Ungureanu, former prime minister of Romania (February–May, 2012) and Head of the Romanian Foreign Intelligence Service (SIE);
- Sorin Frunzăverde, former president of the Caraș-Severin County Council, former MEP, former Minister of Environment, former Minister of Tourism, and former Minister of Defence;
- Radu Câmpeanu, first president of the party after the 1989 Revolution;
- Mircea Ionescu-Quintus, second president of the party after the Romanian Revolution, serving between 1993 and 2001, former President of the Senate, and former Minister of Justice;
- Nicolae Enescu, former Romanian MP and one of the 12 re-founding members of the PNL in January 1990;
- Sorin Bottez, former vice-president of the National Liberal Youth, honorary founding member of PNL and former Minister-Delegate of Public Information in the Ciorbea Cabinet;
- Niculae Cerveni, lawyer, former vice-president of the party during the early 1990s, former deputy, and former senator;
- Alexandru Paleologu, essayist, literary critic, and diplomat;
- Theodor Paleologu, historian and diplomat;
- Neagu Djuvara, historian and diplomat;
- Petre Țuțea, philosopher;
- Nicolae Manolescu, literary critic;
- Călin Popescu-Tăriceanu, former prime minister and former president of the Senate;
- Bogdan Olteanu, former president of the Chamber of Deputies of Romania;
- Teodor Meleșcanu, former director of the Foreign Intelligence Service, Foreign Minister and Minister of National Defence;
- Mircea Diaconu, former Minister of Culture and member of the European Parliament, actor;
- Mihai Stănișoară, former Minister of National Defence;
- Norica Nicolai, former MEP;
- Renate Weber, former MEP, former ombudsman between 2019 and 2021, jurist;
- Victor Ciorbea, former prime minister between 1996 and 1998 and former ombudsman between 2014 and 2019;
- Ramona Mănescu, former MEP and former Minister of Transport;
- Ovidiu Silaghi, former Minister for Small and Medium Enterprises and former Minister of Transport;
- Radu Stroe, former Minister of Interior;
- Viorel Cataramă, businessman and former senator;
- Dinu Patriciu - businessman and architect;
- George Becali - businessman and former deputy;
- Sorin Paliga, former mayor of Sector 3 in Bucharest.

== Electoral history ==
=== Parliamentary elections ===
Election	Chamber			Senate			Position	Aftermath
Election	Votes	%	Seats	Votes	%	Seats	Position	Aftermath
1990	879,290	6.41	29 / 395	985,094	7.06	10 / 119	3rd	Opposition to FSN government (1990–1991)
1990	879,290	6.41	29 / 395	985,094	7.06	10 / 119	3rd	FSN-PNL-MER-PDAR government (1991–1992)
1992	284,678	2.62	0 / 341	290,866	2.66	0 / 143	9th	Extra-parliamentary opposition to PDSR-PUNR-PRM-PSM government (1992–1996)
1996	3,692,321	30.17	28 / 343	3,772,084	30.70	22 / 143	1st (within CDR)^{1}	CDR-USD-UDMR government (1996–2000)
2000	747,263	6.89	30 / 345	814,381	7.48	13 / 140	4th	Opposition to PDSR minority government (2000–2004)
2004	3,191,546	31.33	64 / 332	3,250,663	31.77	28 / 137	2nd (within DA)^{2}	DA-PUR-UDMR government (2004–2007)
2004	3,191,546	31.33	64 / 332	3,250,663	31.77	28 / 137	2nd (within DA)^{2}	PNL-UDMR minority government (2007–2008) (Note: With Social Democratic Party (PSD) endorsement/confidence and supply)
2008	1,279,063	18.60	65 / 334	1,291,029	18.74	28 / 137	3rd	Opposition to PDL-PSD government (2008–2009)
2008	1,279,063	18.60	65 / 334	1,291,029	18.74	28 / 137	3rd	Opposition to PDL-UNPR-UDMR government (2009–2012)
2008	1,279,063	18.60	65 / 334	1,291,029	18.74	28 / 137	3rd	USL government (2012)
2012	4,344,288	58.63	100 / 412	4,457,526	60.10	50 / 176	1st (within USL)^{3}	USL government (2012–2014)
2012	4,344,288	58.63	100 / 412	4,457,526	60.10	50 / 176	1st (within USL)^{3}	Opposition to PSD-UNPR-UDMR-PC government (2014)
2012	4,344,288	58.63	100 / 412	4,457,526	60.10	50 / 176	1st (within USL)^{3}	Opposition to PSD-UNPR-ALDE government (2014–2015)
2012	4,344,288	58.63	100 / 412	4,457,526	60.10	50 / 176	1st (within USL)^{3}	Endorsing the technocratic Cioloș Cabinet (2015–2017)
2016	1,412,377	20.04	69 / 329	1,440,193	20.42	30 / 136	2nd	Opposition to PSD-ALDE government (2017–2019)
2016	1,412,377	20.04	69 / 329	1,440,193	20.42	30 / 136	2nd	Opposition to PSD minority government (2019)
2016	1,412,377	20.04	69 / 329	1,440,193	20.42	30 / 136	2nd	PNL minority government (2019–2020)
2020	1,486,401	25.19	93 / 330	1,511,225	25.58	41 / 136	2nd	PNL-USR PLUS-UDMR government (2020–2021)
2020	1,486,401	25.19	93 / 330	1,511,225	25.58	41 / 136	2nd	PNL-UDMR minority government (2021)
2020	1,486,401	25.19	93 / 330	1,511,225	25.58	41 / 136	2nd	CNR government (2021–2024)
2024	1,219,762	13.20	49 / 331	1,322,468	14.28	22 / 136	3rd	PSD-PNL-UDMR minority government (2024–2025)
2024	1,219,762	13.20	49 / 331	1,322,468	14.28	22 / 136	3rd	PNL-UDMR minority government (2025)
2024	1,219,762	13.20	49 / 331	1,322,468	14.28	22 / 136	3rd	PSD-PNL-USR-UDMR government (2025–2026)
2024	1,219,762	13.20	49 / 331	1,322,468	14.28	22 / 136	3rd	PNL-USR-UDMR minority government (2026)
2024	1,219,762	13.20	49 / 331	1,322,468	14.28	22 / 136	3rd	Endorsing PSD minority government (2026–present)

Notes:

^{1} The members of the CDR were the PNȚCD (with 25 senators and 81 deputies), the PNL, the PNL-CD (with 1 senator and 4 deputies), the PAR (with 3 senators and 3 deputies), the PER (with 1 senator and 5 deputies), and the Ecologist Federation of Romania (FER - with 1 senator and 1 deputy).
^{2} The members of the Justice and Truth Alliance (DA) alliance were the PNL and the PD (with 21 senators and 48 deputies).
^{3} The Social Liberal Union (USL) was a larger political alliance comprising two other smaller political alliances as follows: the Centre Left Alliance (ACS) and the Centre Right Alliance (ACD). The Centre Left Alliance (ACS) members were the PSD and the UNPR (with 5 senators and 10 deputies). The members of the Centre Right Alliance (ACD) were the PNL (with 51 senators and 101 deputies) and the PC (with 8 senators and 13 deputies). Furthermore, de facto, the PNL became the 2nd largest political party in the Romanian Parliament in the wake of the 2012 Romanian legislative election.

=== Local elections ===
==== National results ====
Election	County Councillors (CJ)			Mayors			Local Councillors (CL)			Popular vote	%	Position
Election	Votes	%	Seats	Votes	%	Seats	Votes	%	Seats	Popular vote	%	Position
2008	1,521,191	18.20	297 / 1,393	1,721,834	19.50	706 / 3,179	1,576,214	19.80	8,529 / 40,297	1,537,840	18.08	3rd
2012	4,203,007	49.68	723 / 1,338	2,782,792	33.99	1,292 / 3,121	2,630,123	32.74	12,668 / 39,121	—N/a	—N/a	1st (as USL)
2016	2,529,986	30.64	504 / 1,434	2,686,099	31.50	1,081 / 3,186	2,478,549	29.60	13,198 / 40,067	2,529,986	30.64	2nd
2020	2,212,904	30.76	474 / 1,340	2,578,820	34.58	1,232 / 3,176	2,420,413	32.88	14,182 / 39,900	2,334,039	29.78	1st
2024	2,178,075	27.63	436 / 1,338	2,548,478	29.07	1,144 / 3,180	2,273,927	26.16	12,767 / 39,900	2,314,354	29.15	2nd

Election	County Presidents (PCJ)			Position
Election	Votes	%	Seats	Position
2000	596,017	6.96	1 / 41	4th
2004	1,445,674	15.99	6 / 41	2nd
2008	1,537,840	18.08	5 / 41	3rd
2012	4,260,709	49.71	15 / 41	1st (as USL)
2016	2,529,986	30.64	8 / 41	2nd
2020	2,261,157	31.07	17 / 41	2nd
2024	2,314,354	29.15	12 / 41	2nd

==== Mayor of Bucharest ====
Election	Candidate	First round			Second round		
Election	Candidate	Votes	Percentage	Position	Votes	Percentage	Position
1992	Crin Halaicu	—N/a	—N/a	—N/a	—N/a	55.88%	1st
1996	Victor Ciorbea^{1}	—N/a	39.61%	1st	—N/a	56.74%	1st
2000	George Pădure	45,861	7.24%	4th	not qualified		
2004	Traian Băsescu^{2}	417,153	54.94%	1st	—		
2008	Ludovic Orban	64,636	11.85%	4th	not qualified		
2012	Sorin Oprescu^{3}	430,512	53.79%	1st			
2016	Cătălin Predoiu	64,186	11.18%	3rd			
2020	Nicușor Dan^{4}	282,631	42.81%	1st			
2024	Sebastian Burduja	53,385	7.77%	4th			
2025	Ciprian Ciucu	211,562	36.16%	1st			

Notes

^{1} PNȚCD candidate endorsed by PNL as part of Romanian Democratic Convention (CDR).

^{2} PD candidate endorsed by PNL as part of Justice and Truth Alliance (DA).

^{3} Independent candidate endorsed by the Social Liberal Union (USL).

^{4} Independent candidate endorsed by PNL and USR PLUS.

=== Presidential elections ===
Election	Candidate	First round			Second round		
Election	Candidate	Votes	Percentage	Position	Votes	Percentage	Position
1990	Radu Câmpeanu	1,529,188	10.6%	2nd	–		
1992 (Note: The PNL did not support Emil Constantinescu in the 1992 Romanian presidential election. Initially, the then party president, Radu Câmpeanu, proposed King Michael I as a candidate, but he refused. Câmpeanu also withdrew the party from the Romanian Democratic Convention (CDR) in April, 1992 which led to the formation of a splinter party called National Liberal Party-Democratic Convention (PNL-CD). Furthermore, the party did not have its own presidential candidate in the 1992 Romanian presidential election.)	—N/a	—N/a	—N/a	—N/a	—N/a	—N/a	—N/a
1996	Emil Constantinescu^{1}	3,569,941	28.2%	2nd	7,057,906	54.4%	1st
2000	Theodor Stolojan	1,321,420	11.8%	3rd	not qualified		
2004	Traian Băsescu^{2}	3,545,236	33.9%	2nd	5,126,794	51.2%	1st
2009	Crin Antonescu	1,945,831	20.0%	3rd	not qualified		
2009	Mircea Geoană^{3}	not endorsed			5,205,760	49.7%	2nd
2014	Klaus Iohannis^{4}	2,881,406	30.3%	2nd	6,288,769	54.4%	1st
2019	Klaus Iohannis	3,485,292	37.8%	1st	6,509,135	66.1%	1st
2024	Nicolae Ciucă	811,952	8.79%	5th	not qualified		
2024	Elena Lasconi^{5}	not endorsed			election annulled		
2025	Crin Antonescu^{6}	1,892,930	20.07%	3rd	not qualified		
2025	Nicușor Dan^{7}	not endorsed			6,168,642	53.6%	1st

Notes:

^{1} Emil Constantinescu was the common centre-right candidate that was endorsed by the PNL in 1996 as part of the larger Romanian Democratic Convention (CDR).

^{2} Traian Băsescu was the common centre-right candidate that was endorsed by the PNL in 2004 as part of the Justice and Truth Alliance (DA) alongside the now defunct Democratic Party (PD).

^{3} PSD candidate endorsed by PNL in the second round.

^{4} Although Klaus Iohannis was a member of the PNL, he was the common centre-right candidate that was endorsed by the party in 2014 as part of the Christian Liberal Alliance (ACL) alongside the now longtime defunct Democratic Liberal Party (PDL). He was also endorsed by the Democratic Forum of Germans in Romania (FDGR/DFDR).

^{5} USR candidate endorsed by PNL in the second round, which was ultimately not held.

^{6} Although Crin Antonescu was a member of the PNL until the 2025 presidential election, he was the common candidate of the then governing coalition (formed by PSD, PNL, and UDMR/RMDSZ), formalised in the „Romania Forward Electoral Alliance (A.RO)”.

^{7} Independent candidate endorsed by PNL in the second round.

=== European Parliament elections ===
Election	Votes	Percentage	MEPs	Position	EU Party	EP Group
Jan. 2007	—N/a	20.0%	7 / 35	2nd	ALDE	ALDE Group^{1}
Nov. 2007	688,859	13.4% ▼	6 / 35 ▼	3rd ▼	ALDE	ALDE Group
2009	702,974 ▲	14.5% ▲	5 / 33 ▼	3rd	ALDE	ALDE Group
2014	835,531 ▲	15.0% ▲	6 / 32 ▲	2nd ▲	ALDE^{2}	EPP Group
2019	2,449,068 ▲	27.0% ▲	10 / 32 ▲	1st ▲	EPP	EPP Group
2024	4,341,686 ▲	48.55% ▲	8 / 33 ▼	1st (within CNR)^{3}	EPP	EPP Group

Notes:

^{1} During the 2004–09 EU parliament session, the Parliament of Romania sent 7 delegates on behalf of the PNL to the European Parliament.
^{2} Subsequently, sought permission to adhere to the European People's Party (EPP) as well as to its affiliated EU Parliament group and had been successfully accepted within it as a full member in the meantime.
^{3} National Coalition for Romania members: PSD (11 MEPs) and PNL (8 MEPs).

== See also ==
- National Liberal Party (PNL; Republic of Moldova sister party)
- National Liberal Ecologist Alliance (ANLE)
- Liberalism and radicalism in Romania
- List of political parties in Romania
- List of liberal parties
