= National Liberal Ecologist Alliance =

The National Liberal Ecologist Alliance (Romanian: Alianța Național Liberală Ecologistă, ANLE) was a minor political and electoral alliance in Romania which was formed in 1996 by the National Liberal Party–Câmpeanu (Romanian: Partidul Național Liberal-Câmpeanu, PNL-C) and the Green Party (Romanian: Partidul Alternativa Verde-Ecologiștii as it was then known, or PV for short nowadays). PNL-C was a breakaway national liberal political party from the main National Liberal Party (PNL).

The alliance ran in the 1996 Romanian general election with Radu Câmpeanu as its presidential candidate (who previously ran for president in the 1990 Romanian general election, finish second behind Ion Iliescu of the National Salvation Front or FSN for short). The alliance obtained modest electoral results and did not run in subsequent elections in Romania after 1996. It did not obtain any mandates/seats for members of parliament (MPs) within the Parliament of Romania. For the 1996 Romanian local elections, it is known that the National Liberal Party–Câmpeanu (PNL-C) alone obtained modest electoral results (e.g. just 15 mayors nationwide).

== Electoral history ==
=== Presidential elections ===
Election	Candidate	Votes	%	Position
1996	Radu Câmpeanu	43,780	0.34%	12th

=== Legislative elections ===
Election	Chamber			Senate			Position	Aftermath
Election	Votes	%	Seats	Votes	%	Seats	Position	Aftermath
1996	96,412	0.79	0 / 345	86,359	0.70	0 / 140	14th	Extra-parliamentary

== See also ==
- Ecologist Party of Romania (PER)
- Romanian Democratic Convention (CDR)
- National Liberal Party (Republic of Moldova)
