= Stolojan cabinet =

Stolojan
- 110th Cabinet of Romania

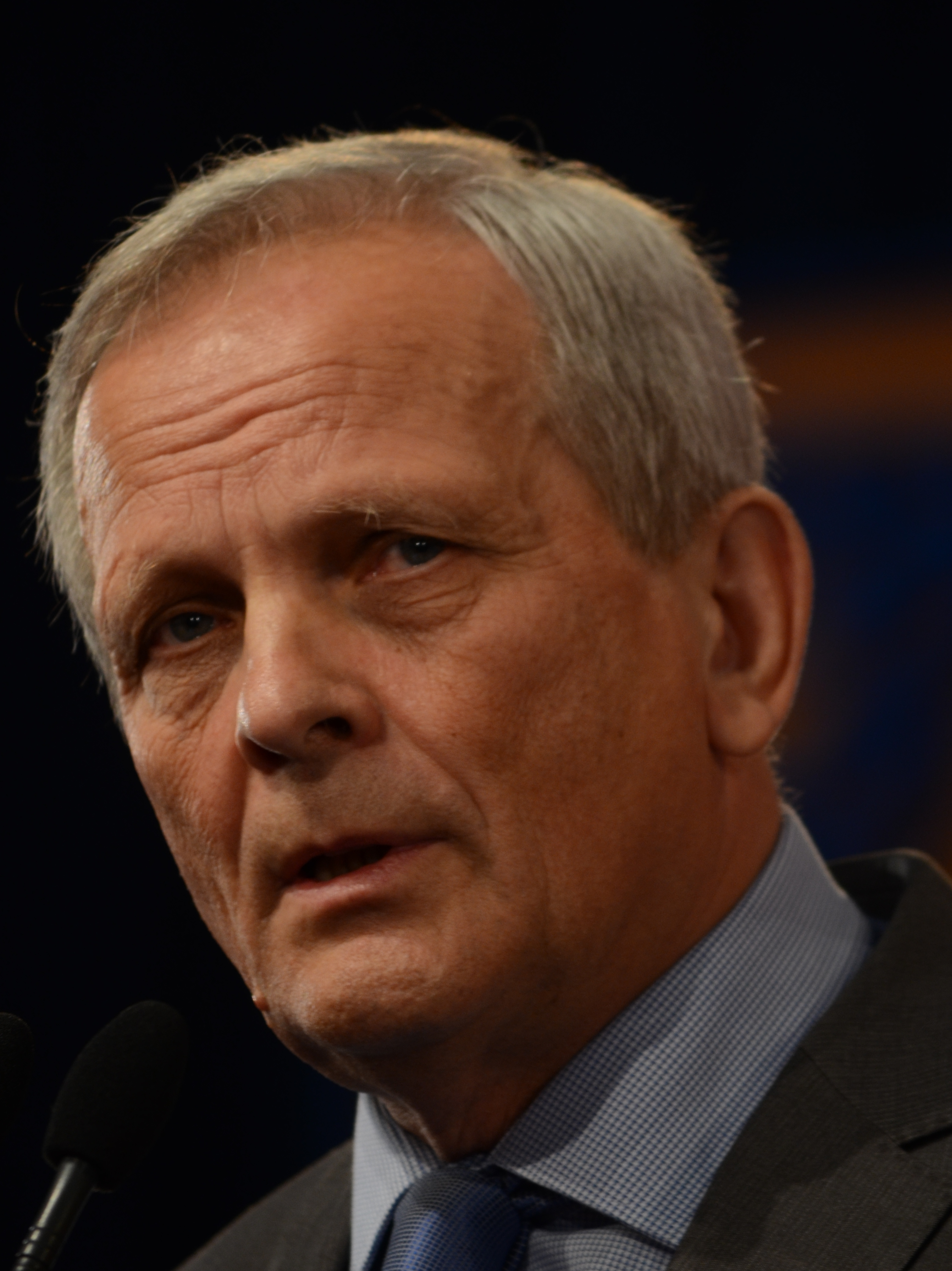
- Date formed: 16 October 1991
- Date dissolved: 19 November 1992

People and organisations
- Head of state: Ion Iliescu
- Head of government: Theodor Stolojan
- Member party: FSN, FDSN, PNL, MER, PDAR
- Status in legislature: Majority

History
- Election: -
- Outgoing election: 27 September 1992
- Predecessor: Roman III
- Successor: Văcăroiu

The Stolojan Cabinet was the Cabinet of the Government of Romania between 16 October 1991 and 19 November 1992. It was the fourth post-communist cabinet. The Prime Minister was Theodor Stolojan, a former financial bureaucrat during communism (previously responsible with the foreign currency as well as the money of the Securitate, according to former Romanian President Emil Constantinescu). Stolojan was an independent minister of finance in the Roman cabinet, dominated by the FSN. The Stolojan Cabinet was a transition cabinet, in charge with organizing the elections, and included FSN members and members from other parties national liberals, ecologists, agrarians, and independents.

== Membership ==
| Position | Minister | Party | Date sworn in | Left office |
|---|---|---|---|---|
| Prime Minister (Romanian: Prim-ministru) | Theodor Stolojan | Independent | 16 October 1991 | 19 November 1992 |
| Minister of External Affairs (Romanian: Ministrul Afacerilor Externe) | Adrian Năstase | FSN / FDSN | 16 October 1991 | 19 November 1992 |
| Minister of National Defence (Romanian: Ministrul Apărării Naționale) | Niculae Spiroiu | Independent | 16 October 1991 | 19 November 1992 |
| Minister of Justice (Romanian: Ministrul Justiției) | Mircea Ionescu-Quintus | PNL | 16 October 1991 | 19 November 1992 |
| Minister of the Interior (Romanian: Ministrul de Interne) | Victor Babiuc | FSN | 16 October 1991 | 19 November 1992 |
| Minister of Economy and Finance (Romanian: Ministrul Economiei și Finanțelor) | George Danielescu | PNL | 16 October 1991 | 19 November 1992 |
| Minister of Labor and Social Protection (Romanian: Ministrul Muncii și Protecției Sociale) | Dan Mircea Popescu | FSN / FDSN | 16 October 1991 | 19 November 1992 |
| Minister of Trade and Tourism (Romanian: Ministrul Comerțului și Turismului) | Constantin Fota | Independent | 16 October 1991 | 19 November 1992 |
| Minister of Industry (Romanian: Ministrul Industriei) | Dan Constantinescu | Independent | 16 October 1991 | 19 November 1992 |
| Minister of Agriculture and Food (Romanian: Ministrul Agriculturii și Alimentației) | Petru Mărculescu | PDAR | 16 October 1991 | 19 November 1992 |
| Minister of Transport (Romanian: Ministrul Transporturilor) | Traian Băsescu | FSN | 16 October 1991 | 19 November 1992 |
| Minister of Communications (Romanian: Ministrul Comunicațiilor) | Andrei Chirică | Independent | 16 October 1991 | 19 November 1992 |
| Minister of Public Works and Territorial Planning (Romanian: Ministrul Lucrărilor Publice și Amenajării Teritoriului) | Dan Nicolae | FSN / FDSN | 16 October 1991 | 19 November 1992 |
| Minister of Environment (Romanian: Ministrul Mediului) | Marcian Bleahu | MER | 16 October 1991 | 19 November 1992 |
| Minister of Education and Science (Romanian: Ministrul Învățământului și Științei) | Mihail Golu | FSN / FDSN | 16 October 1991 | 19 November 1992 |
| Minister of Culture (Romanian: Ministrul Culturii) | Ludovic Spiess | Independent | 16 October 1991 | 19 November 1992 |
| Minister of Health (Romanian: Ministrul Sănătății) | Mircea Maiorescu | Independent | 16 October 1991 | 19 November 1992 |
| Minister of Youth and Sport (Romanian: Ministrul Tineretului și Sportului) | Ioan Moldovan | FSN / FDSN | 16 October 1991 | 19 November 1992 |
| Minister of the Budget, State Revenue and Financial Control (Romanian: Ministrul Bugetului, Veniturilor Statului și Controlului Financiar) | Florian Bercea | FSN | 16 October 1991 | 19 November 1992 |
| Minister for Relations with Parliament (Romanian: Ministrul pentru relația cu Parlamentul) | Ion Aurel Stoica | FSN | 16 October 1991 | 19 November 1992 |
