= Mihai Montanu =

Romanian diplomat (born 1949)

Mihail Montanu (born April 21, 1949) was a leader in the 1989 Romanian Revolution and was one of 40 original members of the National Salvation Front (FSN) whom Ion Iliescu named as representative of the civil servants at the Defense Ministry of the FSN on December 22, 1989.

== Biography ==
From 1979 to 1987, Montanu served as project manager at the institute for hydropower studies and projections. Due to having relatives abroad, namely a sister in Germany, Montanu was dismissed from this position in March 1987. After a short series of projects abroad, Montanu returned to Bucharest in September 1989 as an engineering consultant.

In December 1989, during the revolution, Montanu met with Petre Roman, a fellow dissident and one of three leaders in the FSN in the TV station of the central committee. Together, the pair decided upon a message, but due to a failure in equipment, they had to find other means of broadcasting, eventually settling on a broadcasting station belonging to Televiziunea Română (TVR).

Since the revolution, Montanu has worked in the ministry of foreign affairs, with leading positions at the Romanian embassies in Namibia and Malaysia. Later he was summoned to Rio de Janeiro to serve as the General Consul from 2004 to 2010. Whilst in the position, Mihail Monceanu, said that approximately 90% of Romanians in Brazil were Jews and came during the World War II.

== Awards ==
In 1993, Montanu was awarded the title "Fighter for the victory of the Romanian Revolution in December 1989" and received a revolutionary certificate with the LRM-M-70 series.
