= Red Quadrilateral =

Red Pentagon Red Quadrilateral Pentagonala Roșie Patrulaterul Roșu
- Founded: 1992
- Dissolved: 1996
- Ideology: Post-communism; Left-wing nationalism Left-wing populism Social conservatism Economic nationalism Factions: Ultranationalism
- Political position: Centre-left to left-wing Factions: Far-right
- Colors: Red
- Senate (1992): 79 / 143
- Chamber of Deputies (1992): 176 / 341

The Red Quadrilateral (Romanian: Patrulaterul roșu) was a term used by the Romanian 1990s media to describe the political alliance that supported the Romanian government between the 1992 and 1996 legislative elections.

The 'Quadrilateral', informal at first, consisted of the Democratic Front of National Salvation (FDSN, a major party, led by Oliviu Gherman and Adrian Năstase, which had supported Ion Iliescu's bid for presidency), the nationalist Romanian National Unity Party (PUNR) of Gheorghe Funar and the Greater Romania Party (at that time national-communist) of Corneliu Vadim Tudor, and the neo-communist Socialist Party of Labour of Ceaușescu era Prime Minister Ilie Verdeț. As Parliament support for the FDSN (renamed Party of Social Democracy in Romania or PDSR in 1993) government was dwindling, the alliance was made official in January 1995.

Only the PDSR and the PUNR were awarded government portfolios, the other two only receiving lower-level positions in the government. Sometimes the Democratic Agrarian Party of Romania (PDAR), leading some journalists to label it the Red Pentagon (Romanian: Pentagonala roșie). However, the PDAR went into the opposition in 1994.

The coalition supported President Ion Iliescu and Prime Minister Nicolae Văcăroiu. (See also Văcăroiu I Cabinet.)

During the last year, Vadim's party officially left the coalition but continued to support it in the Parliament. Funar's and Verdeț' parties alongside PDAR's coalition did not pass the threshold in 1996, while the other two parties joined the opposition.

== Composition ==
Party	Abbr.	Leader	Ideology
Democratic National Salvation Front (Note: renamed as the Party of Social Democracy in Romania in 1993)	FDSN (Note: PDSR from 1993)	Oliviu Gherman; Adrian Năstase	Social democracy
Romanian National Unity Party	PUNR	Gheorghe Funar	Romanian nationalism
Greater Romania Party	PRM	Corneliu Vadim Tudor	National communism
Socialist Party of Labour	PSM	Ilie Verdeț	Neo-communism
Democratic Agrarian Party of Romania	PDAR	Victor Surdu	Agrarianism
