= Ionel Săndulescu =

Romanian politician

Ionel I.V. Săndulescu is a Romanian politician who stems from the National Liberal Party (PNL) and was previously elected senator in the Romanian Senate in the 1990–1992 legislature. He was one of the 12 re-founding members of the National Liberal Party (PNL) back in early 1990, alongside other former historical PNL members such as Radu Câmpeanu, Sorin Bottez, or Nicolae Enescu.
