= Liberal Party '93 =

Romanian political party (1993–1997)

The Liberal Party '93 (Romanian: Partidul Liberal '93, or PL '93 for short) was a liberal political party in Romania which was active between 1993 and 1997, formed in 1993 after the merger of PNL-AT with a faction of the PNL-CD (which was led by Niculae Cerveni).

It subsequently fully merged with the PNL-CD on 14 June 1997. Throughout its existence, the party had sided itself with the Romanian Democratic Convention (CDR), exactly as PNL-AT and PNL-CD led by Niculae Cerveni, and as opposed to the PNL-C led by Radu Câmpeanu. On 7 September 1998, PL '93 had officially re-integrated itself in the main National Liberal Party (PNL).

== Notable members ==
One of PL '93 most notable members was future PNL president and Prime Minister of Romania Ludovic Orban, who had initially worked as a political advisor for the party between 1993 and 1997.
