= National Democratic Party (Romania) =

National Democratic Party Partidului Naţional Democrat
- Chairman: Daniel Fenechiu
- Founded: 26 February 2015
- Dissolved: 2019
- Split from: People's Party – Dan Diaconescu (PP-DD)
- Merged into: National Liberal Party (PNL)
- Headquarters: Bucharest
- Ideology: Economic liberalism Social conservatism
- Political position: Centre-right
- Colours: Blue

Website
- pndnational.ro

The National Democratic Party (Romanian: Partidului Naţional Democrat) is a political party in Romania formed on 26 February 2015 by parliamentarians of the now defunct People's Party – Dan Diaconescu (PP-DD). The PP-DD later officially merged with the National Union for the Progress of Romania (UNPR) after its leader Diaconescu was arrested and sentenced for extortion.

The leader of the party's group in the Chamber of Deputies was lawyer Daniel Fenechiu. It previously had a cooperation agreement with the Romanian Social Party (PSRO) which was led by Mircea Geoană, ex-president of the Social Democratic Party. It subsequently merged with the National Liberal Party (PNL).
