= Liberal Women Organisation (Romania) =

Wing of the National Liberal Party

Organizaţia Naţională a Femeilor Liberale (National Organisation of Liberal Women in Romanian) is the women's wing of the National Liberal Party of Romania (PNL). It represents the women of the PNL in local, county and national organisations.
