= Dinu Zamfirescu =

Romanian politician

Gabriel Toma Nicolae Constantin "Dinu" Zamfirescu (born 26 June 1929 in Bucharest, Kingdom of Romania) is a Romanian politician, former political prisoner during Communism, BBC reporter, human rights activist, researcher of Communist archives, founder of the National Institute for the Memory of Romanian Exile, and one of the 12 founding members of the Romanian National Liberal Party (PNL) after the 1989 Revolution.

Since 2012, he has been a member of the College of the Romanian National Council for the Study of Communist Archives (Romanian: Colegiul Consiliului Național pentru Studierea Arhivelor Comunismului - CNSAS), elected on behalf of the National Liberal Party (PNL). Since 2012, he is President of the Scientific Council of the Romanian Institute for the Investigation of Communist Crimes and the Memory of the Romanian Exile (Romanian: Institutul de Investigare a Crimelor Comunismului și Memoria Exilului Românescu - IICCMER).
