= Socialist Party of Labour =

Socialist Party of Labour Partidul Socialist al Muncii
- Abbreviation: PSM
- Chairperson: Ilie Verdeț
- Honorary president: Constantin Pârvulescu
- Founded: 16 November 1990
- Dissolved: July 2003
- Preceded by: Romanian Communist Party
- Merged into: PSD (faction)
- Succeeded by: PSR (faction)
- Ideology: Neo-communism; Left-wing nationalism Democratic socialism
- Political position: Left-wing to far-left
- National affiliation: National Bloc (senate); Red Pentagon (1992–96)

The Socialist Party of Labour (Romanian: Partidul Socialist al Muncii, PSM) was a left wing-nationalist political party in Romania. The party was labelled as neo-communist. It was founded on 16 November 1990. The chairman of the party was Ilie Verdeţ, former Communist Prime Minister between 1979 and 1982, under General Secretary Nicolae Ceaușescu. The PSM was a self-proclaimed successor of the Romanian Communist Party.

After brief success in the mid-1990s, the party lost its representation in parliament, and in 2003, merged into the Social Democratic Party (PSD); members who objected to the fusion formed a splinter group, called the Socialist Alliance Party (PSR).

== History ==
The party was established by Ilie Verdeț, who served as Prime Minister of Romania under Nicolae Ceaușescu from 1979 to 1982, to serve as an alternative to the National Salvation Front that led Romania out of socialist rule. Initially, the party called itself the Romanian Socialist Party, but it was approached for a merger by a large faction of the Democratic Party of Labour, and the name "Socialist Party of Labour" was settled upon. The party defended the legacy of the Romanian Communist Party, and in its own words it aimed to "continue the glorious traditions of the labor and socialist movement in our country".

At the 1992 general election, the party obtained roughly 3% of votes and thus entered the parliament. Together with the Greater Romania Party (PRM), the PSM formed the "National Bloc" faction in the Romanian Senate. The PSM participated in the so-called Red Quadrilateral coalition that included Iliescu's Democratic National Salvation Front (FDSN), the Greater Romania Party (PRM; at that time national communist), the Agrarian Democracy Party (PDAR), and the nationalist Romanian National Unity Party (PUNR).

However, in March 1995, a breakway faction led by Tudor Mohora quit to form the Socialist Party (PS; not to be confused with the Romanian Socialist Party that also existed at the time). Nevertheless, at the 1996 Romanian local elections, the PSM won 4.06% of the total votes, placing 8th among Romania's political parties. The PSM won 120 mayorships in total, including 10 cities and towns, one of which was Brăila.

For the 1996 presidential election, the party stood the writer Adrian Păunescu as their candidate. The party stood again for the parliamentary election, but the outcome was disastrous. While PSM and PS together increased the vote share that PSM alone won in 1992 (in 1996 the two parties got 4.4% for elections to both houses), separately, they both fell below the threshold, and PSM lost its representation in both houses of parliament. Another party, PSMR (Romanian Socialist Party of Workers) also split the vote, winning 1.7% for the Chamber and 1.3% for the Senate. Păunescu himself only won 0.69% of votes for the presidential election, behind Mohora's 1.27%.

In 2000, PSM fell even further, losing its local representation.

In July 2003, the party fused with the Social Democratic Party (PSD), while members who objected to the fusion formed a splinter group, called the Socialist Alliance Party (PSR).

== Electoral history ==
=== Legislative elections ===
Election	Chamber			Senate			Position	Aftermath
Election	Votes	%	Seats	Votes	%	Seats	Position	Aftermath
1992	328,283	3.03	13 / 341	347,658	3.18	5 / 143	8th	PDSR-PUNR-PRM-PSM government (1992–1996); Mihail Viziru, a PSM deputy, resigned on 4 September 1995 to serve out his mandate as Prefect of Mehedinți County, which began on 9 August 1995 and ended on 13 May 1996.
1996	262,563	2.15	0 / 343	265,659	2.16	0 / 143	8th	Extra-parliamentary opposition to CDR-USD-UDMR government (1996–2000)
2000	91,027	0.71	0 / 345	96,636	0.89	0 / 140	11th	Extra-parliamentary support for PDSR minority government (2000–2003)

=== Presidential elections ===
Election	Candidate	First round			Second round		
Election	Candidate	Votes	Percentage	Position	Votes	Percentage	Position
1992	Did not compete						
1996	Adrian Păunescu	87,163	0.7%	9th			
2000	Ion Sasu	38,375	0.3%	11th			

=== Local elections ===
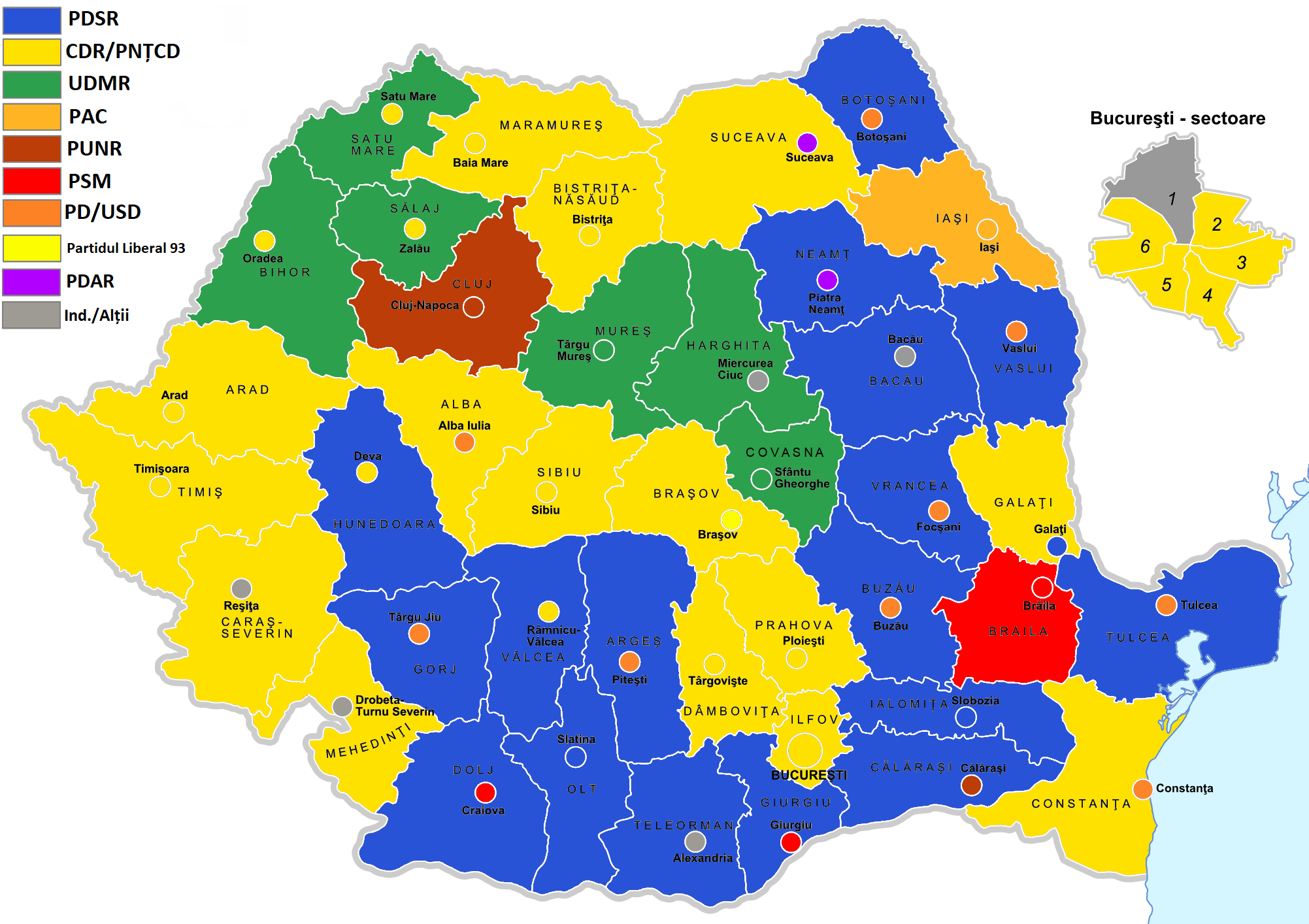
In 1996, the PSM won the presidency of Brăila County, the mayorship of its eponymous seat, plus the mayorship of two other county seats (Craiova and Giurgiu).

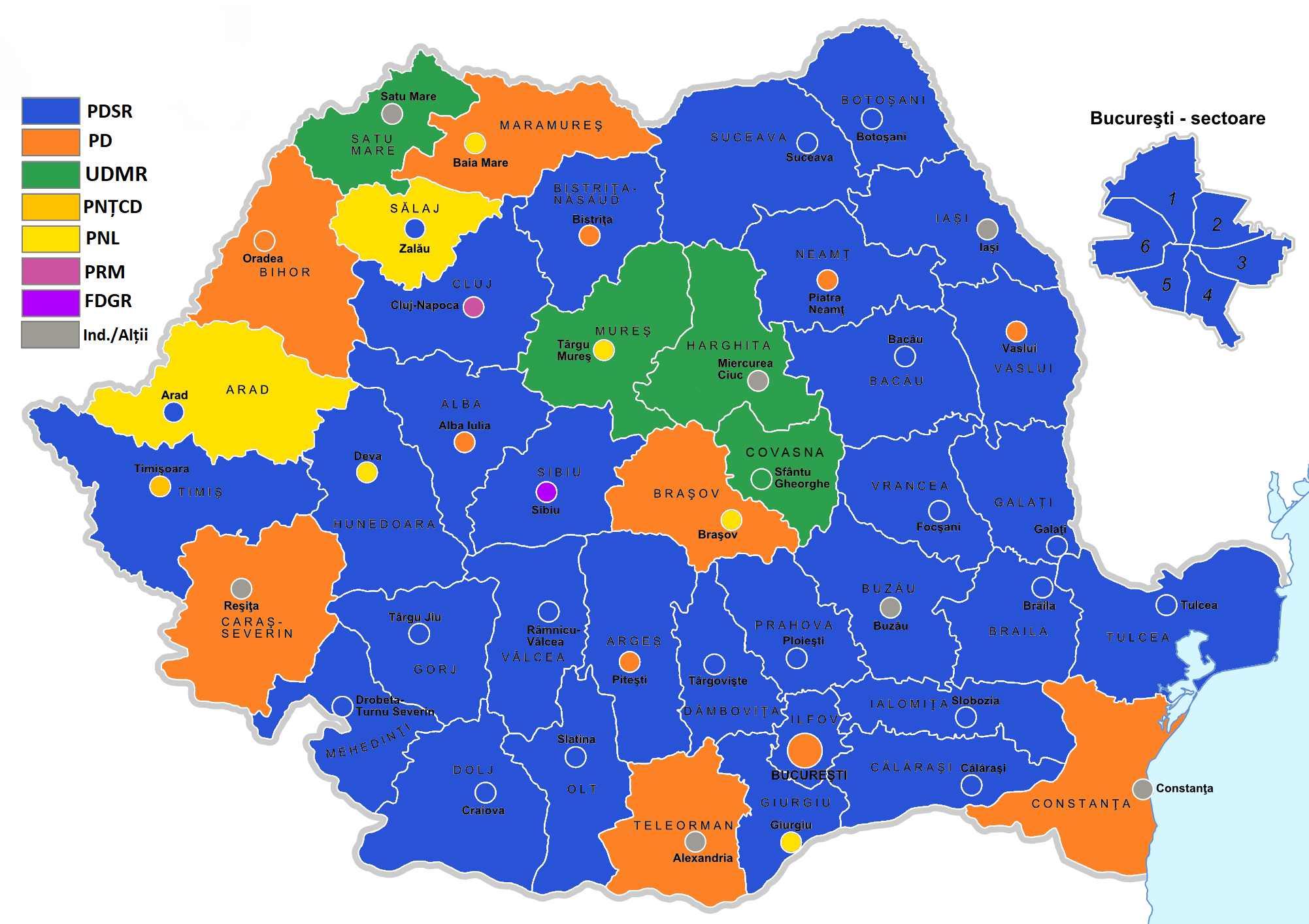
At the 2000 Romanian local elections, the PSM failed to win the presidency of any county or the mayorship of any county seat.

At the 1996 Romanian local elections, the PSM won 4.06% of the total votes, placing 8th among Romania's political parties. The PSM won 120 mayorships in total, including 10 cities and towns, the latter being listed below:

- Brăila County
  - Brăila city (Mayor: Lungu Anton)
  - Făurei town (Mayor: Cosoreanu Virgil)
- Dâmbovița County
  - Găești town (Mayor: Albu Marin)
- Dolj County
  - Craiova city (Mayor: Bulucea Vasile)
- Giurgiu County
  - Giurgiu city (Mayor: Iliescu Lucian)
  - Bolintin-Vale town (Mayor: Pislaru Alexandru)
  - Mihăilești town (Mayor: Vasile I. Corneliu)
- Gorj County
  - Rovinari town (Mayor: Lungu Ilie)
- Mehedinți County
  - Strehaia town (Mayor: Toma Viorel)
- Tulcea County
  - Măcin town (Mayor: Simion Ion)

=
