= Provisional Council of National Unity =

Provisional government body in Romania of the early 1990s

Provisional Council of National Unity Consiliul Provizoriu de Uniune Națională
- Flag
- Abbreviation: CPUN
- Predecessor: National Salvation Front
- Successor: Parliament of Romania/Government of Romania
- Founded: 6 February 1990
- Dissolved: 1991
- Type: Provisional Governing Body
- Purpose: Deliberative democracy
- Headquarters: Bucharest
- Location: Romania
- Official language: Romanian
- President: Ion Iliescu
- Prime Minister: Petre Roman
- Vice-president: Radu Câmpeanu

The Provisional Council of National Unity (PCNU; Romanian: Consiliul Provizoriu de Uniune Națională, CPUN) was a provisional governmental body during the early 1990s in Romania. At that time, it was headed by Ion Iliescu of the National Salvation Front (FSN) along with a wide range of vice-presidents which also stemmed from various other political parties which acceded to the Romanian Parliament at that time, most notably Radu Câmpeanu, the first post-1989 president of the National Liberal Party (PNL).

The PCNU was founded shortly after the National Salvation Front (FSN) became a political party and it was dissolved in 1991, one year prior to then forthcoming 1992 general election.
