= Mircea Ionescu-Quintus =

Romanian politician (1917–2017)

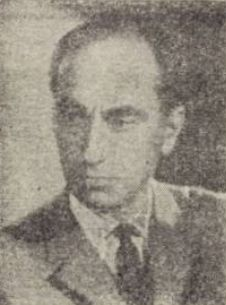
- Ionescu-Quintus in 1972

President of the Senate of Romania
- In office 4 February 2000 – 30 November 2000
- Preceded by: Petre Roman
- Succeeded by: Nicolae Văcăroiu

Minister of Justice
- In office 16 October 1991 – 18 November 1992
- Prime Minister: Theodor Stolojan
- Preceded by: Victor Babiuc
- Succeeded by: Petre Ninosu

Member of the Senate of Romania
- In office 22 November 1996 – 12 December 2004

Member of the Chamber of Deputies
- In office 9 June 1990 – 15 October 1992

Leader of the National Liberal Party
- In office 28 February 1993 – 18 February 2001
- Preceded by: Radu Câmpeanu
- Succeeded by: Valeriu Stoica

Personal details
- Born: 18 March 1917 Kherson, Russian Republic
- Died: 15 September 2017 (aged 100) Ploiești, Romania
- Party: National Liberal Party (PNL)
- Spouse: Viorica Ionescu-Quintus
- Children: 1

Mircea Ionescu-Quintus (Romanian pronunciation: [ˈmirtʃe̯a joˈnesku ˈkvintus]; 18 March 1917 – 15 September 2017) was a Romanian politician who served as a senator and Minister of Justice in the Stolojan Cabinet (1991–1992). He was also the second post-1989 president of the National Liberal Party (PNL) from 1993 to 2001. He also briefly served as Senate President in 2000, during the late part of the Romanian Democratic Convention (CDR) governance. Ionescu-Quintus turned 100 in March 2017, and died six months later.

Currently, he is the longest serving post-1989 president of the National Liberal Party (PNL), having led the party for 7 years and 11 months between 1993 and 2001.

Party political offices
Preceded by Radu Câmpeanu	President of the National Liberal Party; 1993–2000	Succeeded by Valeriu Stoica
