= Oliviu Gherman =

Romanian physicist, politician, and diplomat (1930–2020)

Member of the National Salvation Front Council
- In office 22 December 1989 – 26 December 1989

President of the Senate of Romania
- In office 22 October 1992 – 22 November 1996
- Preceded by: Alexandru Bârlădeanu
- Succeeded by: Petre Roman

Member of the Senate of Romania
- In office 9 June 1990 – 27 August 2001

Ambassador of Romania to France
- In office 4 September 2001 – 4 June 2004

President of the Party of Social Democracy in Romania
- In office 10 July 1993 – January 1997
- Preceded by: Himself (as president of the Democratic National Salvation Front); Marius Cîrciumaru (as president of the Romanian Socialist Democratic Party)
- Succeeded by: Ion Iliescu

President of the Democratic National Salvation Front
- In office 11 October 1992 – 10 July 1993
- Preceded by: Ion Iliescu
- Succeeded by: Himself (party merged with the Romanian Socialist Democratic Party into the Party of Social Democracy in Romania)

Personal details
- Born: 26 April 1930 Sânmihaiu de Sus, Turda County, Kingdom of Romania
- Died: 11 August 2020 (aged 90) Bucharest, Romania
- Resting place: Govora Monastery
- Party: Romanian Communist Party (1963–1989); National Salvation Front (1989–1992); Democratic Front of National Salvation (1992–1993); Party of Social Democracy in Romania (1993–2001); Social Democratic Party (2001–2020)
- Occupation: Professor, politician
- Profession: Physicist

Academic background
- Education: University of Cluj; University of Bucharest
- Thesis: (1957)
- Doctoral advisor: Șerban Țițeica

Academic work
- Institutions: University of Cluj; University of Craiova

Oliviu Gherman (26 April 1930 – 11 August 2020) was a Romanian physicist, politician, university professor, and diplomat.

Born in 1930 in Sânmihaiu de Sus village, Turda County (now part of Mihai Viteazu commune, Cluj County), he completed his undergraduate studies at the University of Cluj in 1952. For his graduate studies, he went to the University of Bucharest, where he obtained his PhD in 1957, with thesis written under the direction of Șerban Țițeica. Gherman then started his academic career at the University of Cluj, becoming dean of the Faculty of Mathematics and Physics in 1965. From 1958 to 1960 he worked at the International Atomic Energy Agency (IAEA) in Vienna. In 1966 he moved to the University of Craiova, where he served as department chair, dean, and prorector. In the 1970s he was a researcher, and from 1973 a senior researcher at the International Centre for Theoretical Physics in Trieste. He kept his faculty position in Craiova until 1998.

After the Romanian Revolution of 1989, Gherman started on a political career. He served as a senator in the 1990–1992, 1992–1996, 1996–2000, and 2000–2004 legislatures. He was first elected in Dolj County on the lists of the FSN party, then elected senator in the electoral constituency No. 41 of Bucharest. During his parliamentary activity, Oliviu Gherman was member of the following parliamentary friendship groups:

- in the 1990–1992 legislature: the State of Israel and the United Kingdom of Great Britain and Northern Ireland;
- in the 1996–2000 legislature: Republic of Ivory Coast and Republic of South Africa;
- in the 2000–2004 legislature: India and Republic of South Africa.

In the legislature 1996–2000, Gherman was a member of the commission for privatization and administration of state assets (since September 1999), the commission for culture, art and mass media (since December 1996) and the Committee on Labor, Family and Social Protection (until September 1999). Gherman was the president of the FDSN party (later PDSR), during 1992–1996.

In 1995, Gherman was conferred a Doctor honoris causa degree by the Moldova State University.

Gherman resigned from the Senate on 27 August 2001 and was replaced by Constantin Alexa. Gherman was a F.S.N. senator. (1990–1992), F.D.S.N. (1992–1996), P.D.S.R. (1996–2000, 2000–2004), president of the F.D.S.N. (1992–1996), and President of the Senate (1992–1996). From 2001 to 2004, Gherman was ambassador of Romania to France.

He died on 11 August 2020 at the age of 90.
