= Niculae Cerveni =

Romanian lawyer (1926–2004)

Niculae Cerveni (born 19 March 1926 in Cervenia, Teleorman, Kingdom of Romania–deceased 16 January 2004 in Bucharest, Romania) was a Romanian lawyer and politician who served both as deputy and senator during the 1990s.

== Political activity ==
He was a political prisoner after he opposed the communist dictatorship which was enforced in the Kingdom of Romania by the Soviets. After the Romanian Revolution of 1989, he founded the Socialist Liberal Party (PSL; Romanian: Partidul Socialist Liberal) in 1990 which shortly afterwards merged within the National Liberal Party (PNL) then led by its first post-1989 president Radu Câmpeanu. Subsequently, Cerveni became vice-president of the National Liberal Party (PNL) under the presidency term of Radu Câmpeanu during the early 1990s. Furthermore, during the early 1990s, before the 1990 Romanian general election, he was a fierce contender of former President Ion Iliescu within the former Provisional Council of National Unity (Romanian: Consiliul Provizoriu de Uniune Națională; CPUN).

In 1992, Cerveni founded the breakway PNL-CD (Romanian: Partidul Național Liberal-Convenția Democrată) for the national liberal members who were dissatisfied with Câmpeanu's decision to withdraw the PNL from the Romanian Democratic Convention (CDR) before the 1992 Romanian general election. The PNL-CD subsequently became an integral part of the CDR for the remainder of the 1990s. In 2000, Niculae Cerveni ran for president in that year's Romanian presidential election on behalf of his newly founded political party, the Romanian Liberal Democratic Party (Romanian: Partidul Liberal Democrat Român; PLDR), but with no major electoral result in the first round.

== Electoral history ==
=== Presidential elections ===
Election	Affiliation	First round			Second round		
Election	Affiliation	Votes	Percentage	Position	Votes	Percentage	Position
2000	Romanian Liberal Democratic Party (PLDR)	31,983	0.29%	12th			
