= Nicolae Enescu =

Romanian politician

Nicolae Enescu (26 November 1911 – 1993) was a Romanian politician who stemmed from the National Liberal Party (PNL) and was one of its re-founding members in early 1990, in the wake of the 1989 Romanian Revolution. He was subsequently elected deputy for Argeș County in the Romanian Chamber of Deputies on behalf of the PNL in the 1990–1992 legislature, following the 1990 general election.

== Political career during the interwar period ==
During the interwar period, Nicolae Enescu was elected deputy on behalf of PNL-Gheorghe Tătărescu.
