= 1996 Romanian local elections =

Local elections were held in Romania on 2 June 1996 and a runoff for mayors on 16 June 1996. Bucharest's mayor became Victor Ciorbea (future Prime Minister of Romania during the late 1990s as well) from the Christian Democratic National Peasants' Party (PNȚCD).

== Results ==
=== Mayors ===
With respect to the results for the mayoral seats, those were as follows:

| Party | Mayors |
|---|---|
| Party of Social Democracy in Romania (PDSR) | 928 |
| Social Democratic Union (USD) | 475 |
| Romanian Democratic Convention (CDR) | 355 |
| Independents (IND) | 273 |
| Democratic Agrarian Party of Romania (PDAR) | 199 |
| Romanian National Unity Party (PUNR) | 147 |
| Democratic Alliance of Hungarians in Romania (UDMR/RMDSZ) | 139 |
| Socialist Party of Labour (PSM) | 120 |
| Liberal Party '93 (PL '93) | 61 |
| Greater Romania Party (PRM) | 57 |
| Civic Alliance Party (PAC) | 44 |
| Romanian Socialist Party (PSR) | 43 |
| Ecological Movement of Romania (MER) | 37 |
| National Liberal Party–Câmpeanu (PNL-C) | 15 |
| Humanist Party (PUR) | 7 |
| Total | 2,900 |

== Electoral map ==
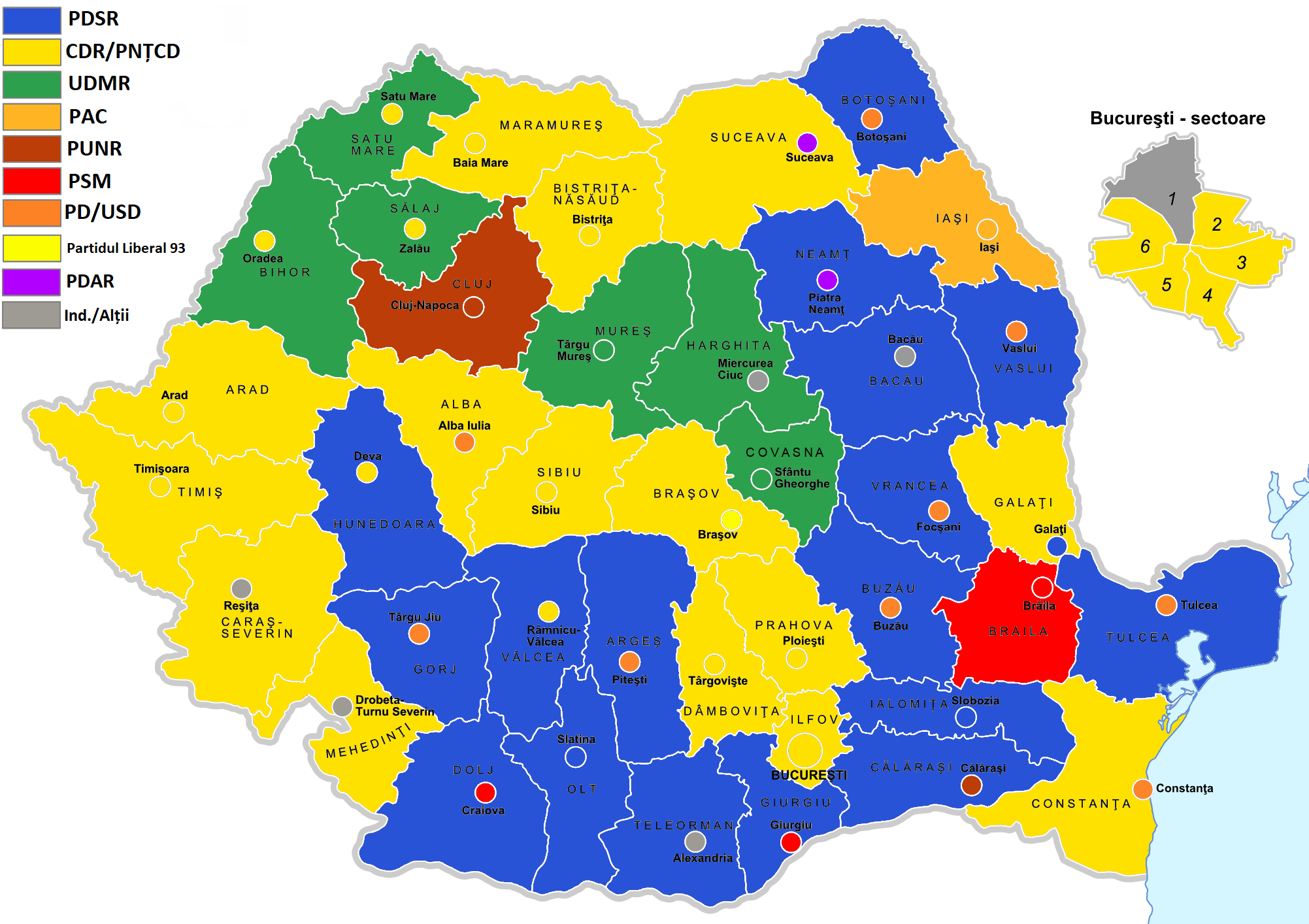
Political map depicting the county president and county seat mayor by winning party
