= 2000 Romanian local elections =

Local elections were held in Romania in 2000 with a runoff for mayors, in which the Party of Social Democracy (PDSR; now PSD) won a majority. Bucharest's mayor became Traian Băsescu from the Democratic Party (PD). Traian Băsescu succeeded previous mayor Viorel Lis of the Christian Democratic National Peasants' Party (PNȚCD).

== Electoral map ==
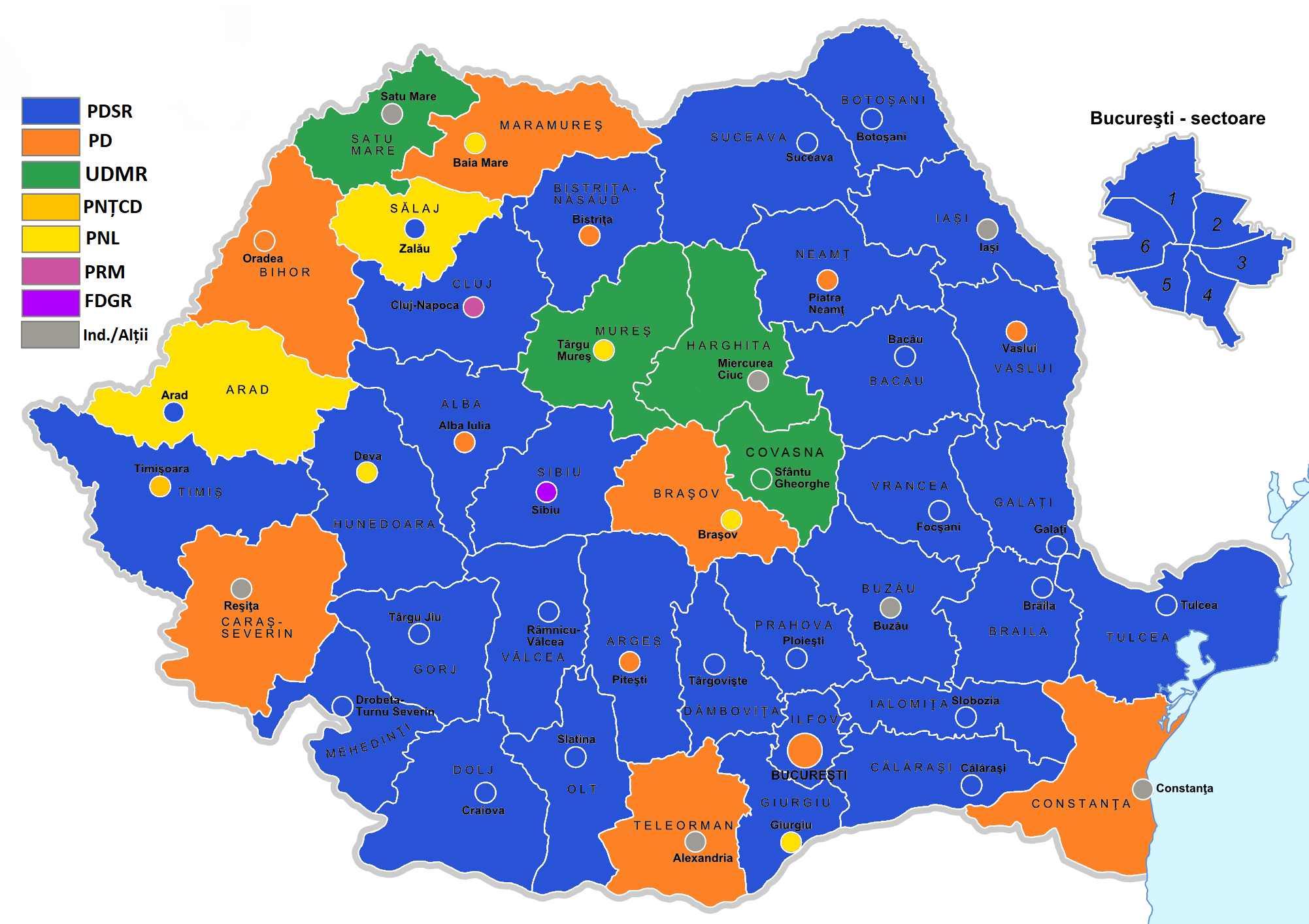
Political map depicting the county president and county seat mayor by winning party. With the PDSR winning a majority in most counties.
