= Democratic Front of National Salvation =

Defunct political party in Romania

Democratic Front of National Salvation Frontul Democrat al Salvării Naționale
- Leader: Ion Iliescu
- President: Ion Iliescu (1992); Oliviu Gherman (1992-1993)
- Executive president: Adrian Năstase
- Founders: List: Ion Iliescu; Vasile Văcaru; Ion Solcanu Oliviu Gherman Diodor Nicoară Gheorghe Dumitrașcu Ion Tătar Emanuil Cernescu Ion Neagu Gheorghe Damian Vasile Secăreș Vladimir Pasti Petre Ninosu Alexandru Albu Petre Ţurlea Adrian Năstase Șerban Nicolae; (Note: The people who registered the party)
- Founded: 7 April 1992
- Dissolved: 10 July 1993
- Split from: National Salvation Front (FSN)
- Merged into: Party of Social Democracy in Romania (PDSR)
- Ideology: Social democracy Democratic socialism Left-wing populism Left-wing nationalism
- Political position: Centre-left to left-wing

The Democratic Front of National Salvation (Romanian: Frontul Democrat al Salvării Naționale, FDSN) was a Romanian political party formed by former President Ion Iliescu and his supporters stemming from the National Salvation Front (FSN) on 7 April 1992. It was the result of the breakup of the previously ruling FSN during the early 1990s.

The smaller wing led by Petre Roman continued using the brand FSN. Unlike the Petre Roman wing of the FSN, which wanted faster economic reforms, the FDSN advocated for a socialist democracy and a slower pace of transition from the communist command economy to a social market economy. On 10 July 1993, the FDSN merged with the Romanian Socialist Democratic Party (PSDR), the Republican Party, and the Cooperative Party, creating the Party of Social Democracy in Romania (PDSR). In 2001, PDSR merged with PSDR to create the present-day Social Democratic Party (PSD).

The first logo of the FDSN. The 3 roses will remain in the Romanian collective mind as a symbol of the FDSN and its successor parties.

== Election history ==
=== Legislative elections ===
Election	Chamber			Senate			Position	Aftermath
Election	Votes	%	Seats	Votes	%	Seats	Position	Aftermath
1992	3,015,708	27.72	117 / 341	3,102,201	28.29	49 / 143	1st	FDSN/PDSR minority government (1992–1995); PDSR-PUNR-PRM-PSM coalition (1995-1996)

=== Presidential elections ===
Election	Candidate	First round			Second round		
Election	Candidate	Votes	Percentage	Position	Votes	Percentage	Position
1992	Ion Iliescu	5,633,465	47.5	1st	7,393,429	61.4	1st

== See also ==
- 1992 Romanian general election
