= National Salvation Front (Romania) =

National Salvation Front Frontul Salvării Naționale
- Abbreviation: FSN
- Co-leaders: Ion Iliescu, Petre Roman, Dumitru Mazilu
- Founded: 22 December 1989 (as governing body); 6 February 1990 (as political party)
- Dissolved: 28 May 1993
- Split from: Romanian Communist Party
- Succeeded by: Democratic Party (legally); Democratic Front of National Salvation (Iliescu faction)
- Headquarters: Bucharest
- Ideology: Big tent Eurocommunism (briefly); Post-communism; Anti-communism; Social democracy Democratic socialism Left-wing populism Economic nationalism
- Political position: Centre-left to left-wing
- Colours: Blue, yellow, red (Romanian Tricolour)

Party flag
- The flag of the Revolution (1989), without the coat of arms.

National Salvation Front Council Consiliul Frontul Salvării Naționale
- Flag
- Abbreviation: CFSN
- Predecessor: Great National Assembly of the Socialist Republic of Romania
- Successor: Provisional Council of National Unity
- Founded: 22 December 1989
- Dissolved: 6 February 1990
- Type: Provisional Governing Body
- Purpose: Deliberative democracy
- Headquarters: Bucharest
- Location: Romania
- Members: List
- Official language: Romanian
- President: Ion Iliescu (from 26 December 1989)
- Prime Minister: Petre Roman (from 26 December 1989)

The National Salvation Front (Romanian: Frontul Salvării Naționale, FSN) was the most important political organization formed during the Romanian Revolution in December 1989; it set up the interim governing body, the National Salvation Front Council of Romania, in the first weeks after the collapse of the communist regime. The FSN subsequently became a political party, the largest party in post-communist Romania, and won the 1990 election with 66% of the national vote. Ion Iliescu, co-leader of the FSN, won election as President of Romania with 85% of the vote.

Iliescu nominated the co-leader of the FSN, Petre Roman, who was serving as interim prime minister, as the prime minister of the first cabinet formed after Romania's first post-Ceaușescu free and fair elections. After the fourth mineriadă (September 1991), Roman was forced to resign on 1 October 1991. Tensions between Iliescu and Roman came to a head in April 1992, at the national congress of FSN, when the party split in two, forming the Democratic Front of National Salvation (FDSN), led by President Iliescu; and FSN, led by Petre Roman (in 1993, the FSN was the renamed as the Democratic Party (PD).

The National Salvation Front (FSN) founded by Iliescu and Roman was the common root of two of the largest active political parties in post-communist Romania: the Social Democratic Party (PSD) and the Democratic Party (PD, later the Democratic Liberal Party, PDL, after the merger with a splinter group from PNL, the Liberal Democratic Party, PLD). In 2014, the second party (the former PD; then PDL) merged into the National Liberal Party (PNL).

== History ==
=== Formation and rise to power ===
In March 1989 six prominent members of the Romanian Communist Party (PCR) wrote an open letter to President Nicolae Ceaușescu that criticised his abuses of power and his economic policies. The so-called "Letter of the Six" was circulated in the Western media and read on Radio Free Europe.

In 1989, before the 14th Congress of the Romanian Communist Party, two letters signed "National Salvation Front" began circulating. They were read on Radio Free Europe on 27 August and 8 November. The first letter had a number of questions about Ceaușescu's mismanagement of the economy and human rights violations, while the second letter appealed to the Congress not to re-elect Ceaușescu.

The creation of the FSN was officially announced to the public by Ion Iliescu in radio and TV addresses on 22 December 1989, after the overthrow of Ceaușescu in the Romanian Revolution. The FSN proclaimed itself the supreme power within Romania. Within four days, the FSN formed an interim government with Ion Iliescu being the president and Petre Roman as the interim prime minister. The initial membership of FSN came from diverse backgrounds: intellectuals, students, army officers, but the leaders were mostly former Communist officials (see List of members of the National Salvation Front Council). People flocked to the National Salvation Front (FSN) for a multitude of reasons ranging from religious oppression in members such as László Tőkés and alleged mismanagement and marginalization of undesirables within the Communist party in members such as Ion Iliescu.

In the following years, the naming identity between the power body created in December 1989 and the group signing the November 1989 leaflets led some to question whether the National Salvation Front (FSN) existed as an underground organization. According to Silviu Brucan, this was not the case, as the letters were written by Alexandru Melian, a professor at the University of Bucharest, who had no connection to the leaders of the NSF. This was contradicted by Nicolae Militaru, who claimed that he, together with Ion Iliescu, led a clandestine National Salvation Front which asked Melian to write this appeal.

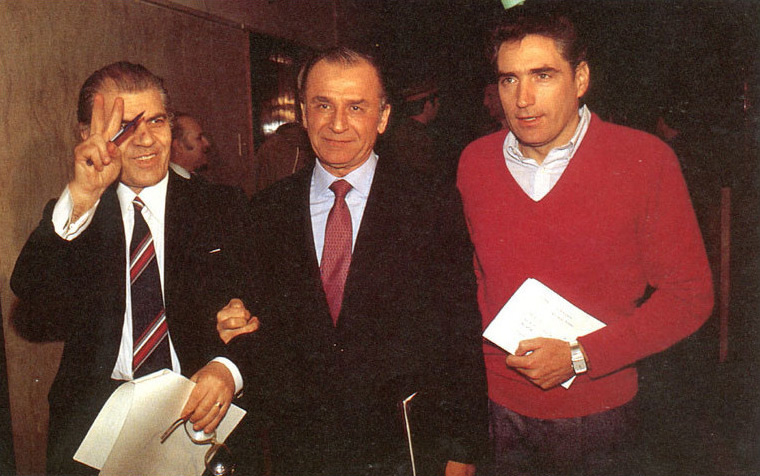
Ion Iliescu (center) with FSN members Dumitru Mazilu (left) and Petre Roman (right) on 23 December 1989, one day after the formation of the FSN.

=== Interim government ===
On 27 December, the FSN decreed the abolition of the one-party system and called for free elections. Shortly afterwards, two major political parties claiming to be the successors of the two most important pre-Communist Romanian parties, more specifically the National Peasants' Party (PNŢ) and the National Liberal Party (PNL), were founded and registered.

At first, the FSN announced that it would not be nominating candidates in the forthcoming elections. However, Silviu Brucan then launched the concept of the big party and supported the transformation of the FSN into a political party. Some members of FSN, like Dumitru Mazilu, Mircea Dinescu, Ion Caramitru, Andrei Pleșu, Dan Hăulică, Gabriel Liiceanu, or Doina Cornea resigned before FSN became a political party.

On 6 February 1990, the FSN, transformed itself into a political party, in order to be able to run in the upcoming elections. Except for a few newspapers, FSN had extensive control over the Romanian mass-media, particularly the state owned television company and the newly founded Adevărul newspaper.

Anti-FSN demonstrations were mounted by the Christian Democratic National Peasants' Party (PNȚ-CD) and the National Liberal Party (PNL) in late January and late February 1990, that degenerated into violence against state authorities. In turn, Iliescu called on the working class to support the FSN against what he noted as "fascist forces, trying to destabilise the country". This has resulted in what were named the first and second Mineriads.

FSN agreed to allow other parties to participate in the provisional government. The new governing body, the Provisional Council of National Unity (Romanian: Consiliul Provizoriu de Uniune Națională, CPUN), still dominated by FSN, would run the country from early February 1990 until the elections.

Another, much larger, demonstration (the Golaniad) against FSN's participation in the elections was organised in April 1990 and lasted 52 days, until 13–15 June, when it was violently dispersed by the third Mineriad.

=== First elected government ===
The FSN had strong support among the peasants and the urban industrial workers, while the PNL and PNŢCD had strong support among the intellectuals in urban areas.

As popular anger was directly primarily at the Ceaușescu family, the FSN benefited from the institutional links of the disbanded Communist Party and needed no specific program in order to win the elections, being a catch-all party.

FSN and its candidate Ion Iliescu comfortably won the legislative and presidential elections on 20 May 1990, obtaining a majority in both the Assembly of Deputies and the Senate. Petre Roman remained Prime Minister, and its government started cautious economic reforms.

=== Breakup ===
The logo of the FSN between 1992 and 1993, used during the presidency of Petre Roman

After growing tensions between Iliescu and Roman, on 7 April 1992, Iliescu and many other members left the FSN and created the Democratic National Salvation Front (Romanian: Frontul Democrat al Salvării Naționale, FDSN), which eventually developed to be the current Social Democratic Party (Romanian: Partidul Social Democrat, PSD).

Petre Roman remained leader of the FSN. On 28 May 1993, the party was renamed Democratic Party – National Salvation Front (Romanian: Partidul Democrat – Frontul Salvării Naționale, PD-FSN), before shortening its name to Democratic Party (PD) in 1998.

== Legacy ==
The National Salvation Front (FSN) has had a major impact on post-1989 Romanian politics. The two parties that emerged from the National Salvation Front (FSN), more specifically the Social Democratic Party (PSD) and the Democratic Liberal Party (PDL), the latter which ultimately merged into the National Liberal Party (PNL) in 2014, governed or participated in government coalitions from 1990 until today.

The former President Traian Băsescu entered politics as an FSN member and served as Minister of Transportation in several FSN governments. Băsescu, stemming as a presidential candidate from the Democratic Party (PD), as part of the Justice and Truth Alliance (DA), remarked rhetorically in a live TV debate with Adrian Năstase, stemming from the Social Democratic Party (PSD), before the 2004 run-off presidential election: "You know what Romania's greatest curse is right now? It's that Romanians have to choose between two former Communist Party (PCR) members."

== Election results ==
=== Legislative elections ===
Election	Chamber			Senate			Position	Aftermath
Election	Votes	%	Seats	Votes	%	Seats	Position	Aftermath
1990	9,089,659	66.31	263 / 395	9,353,006	67.02	91 / 119	1st	FSN government (1990–1991)
1990	9,089,659	66.31	263 / 395	9,353,006	67.02	91 / 119	1st	FSN-PNL-MER-PDAR government (1991–1992)
1992	1,101,425	10.17	43 / 341	1,133,355	10.38	18 / 143	3rd	Opposition to PDSR minority government (1992–1995); Opposition to PDSR-PUNR-PRM-PSM government (1995–1996)

=== Presidential elections ===
Election	Candidate	Votes	%	Position
1990	Ion Iliescu	12,232,498	85.07	1st
1992	Caius Traian Dragomir	564,655	4.7	4th

== Bibliography ==
- Dan Pavel, Iulia Huia, <<Nu putem reuşi decît împreună.>> O istorie analitică a Convenţiei Democratice, 1989-2000, Editura Polirom, Iaşi, 2003.
- Steven D. Roper, Romania: The Unfinished Revolution, Routledge, 2000, ISBN 90-5823-027-9
- Dennis Deletant, Ceaușescu and the Securitate: Coercion and Dissent in Romania, 1965–1989, M.E. Sharpe, London, 1995, ISBN 1-56324-633-3.
