= Mineriad =

1990 Violent protests in Romania

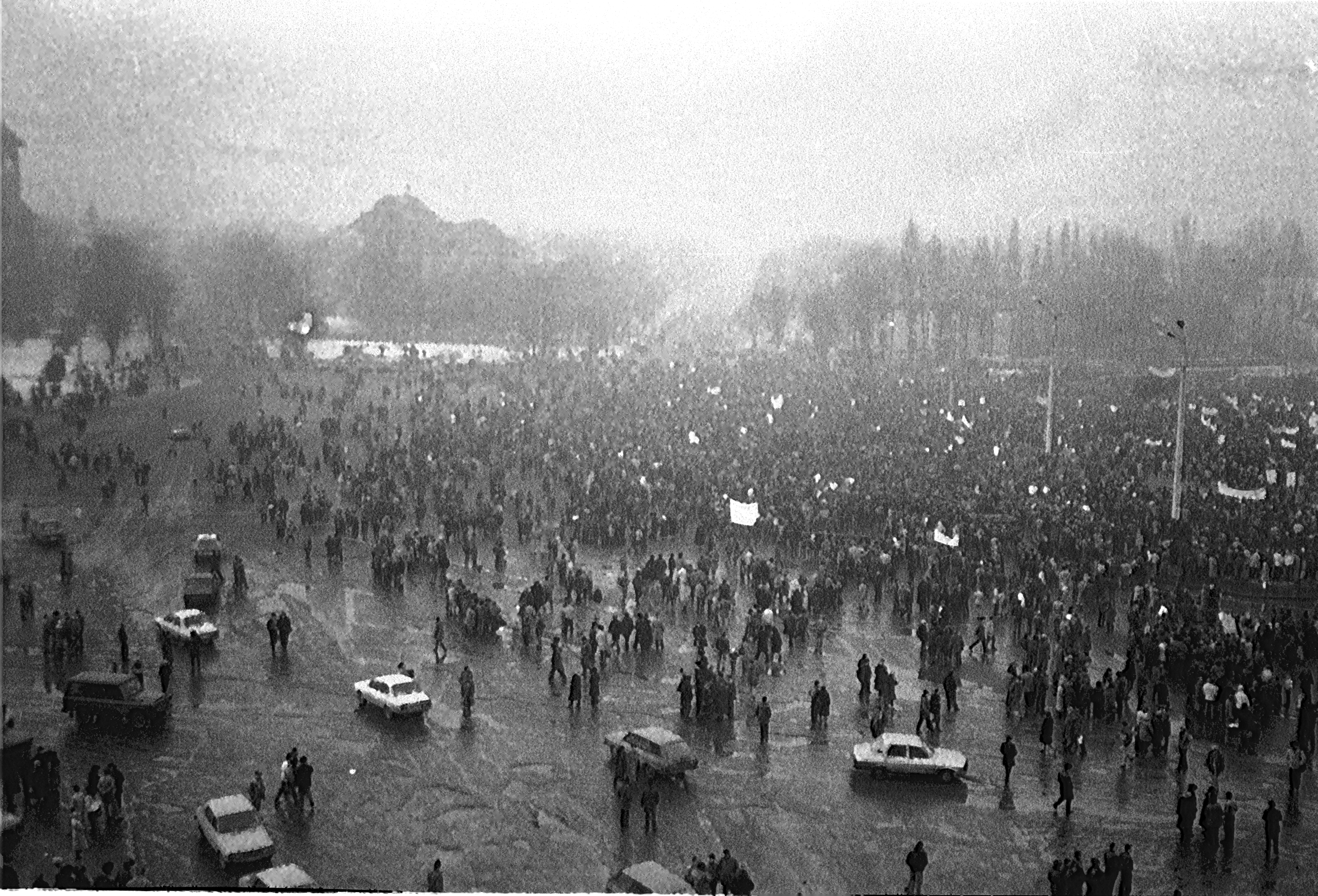
Protests during the February 1990 Mineriad at the Victoria Palace, Bucharest

The mineriads (Romanian: mineriade) were a series of protests and often violent altercations by Jiu Valley miners in Bucharest during the 1990s, particularly 1990–91. The term "mineriad" is also used to refer to the most significant and violent of these encounters, which occurred 13–15 June, 1990. During the 1990s, the Jiu Valley miners played a visible role in Romanian politics, and their protests reflected inter-political and societal struggles after the Romanian Revolution.

== January 1990 mineriad ==
=== 28 January ===
After the National Salvation Front's (FSN) decision to transform itself into a political party, an anti-Communist demonstration took place in Bucharest's Victory Square (Piața Victoriei), organised by the Christian Democratic National Peasants' Party (PNȚ-CD), National Liberal Party (PNL), and other historical and newly founded oppositional smaller parties.

Even though the anti-communist demonstration started out (and was intended to be) non-violent, the protesters charged the Parliament building and demanded the resignation of the FSN party. After that, the FSN started talks with the parliamentary opposition parties.

=== 29 January ===
The miners boarded the trains at Gara de Nord and departed to their homes, but not before President Ion Iliescu thanked them for their services.

== February 1990 mineriad ==
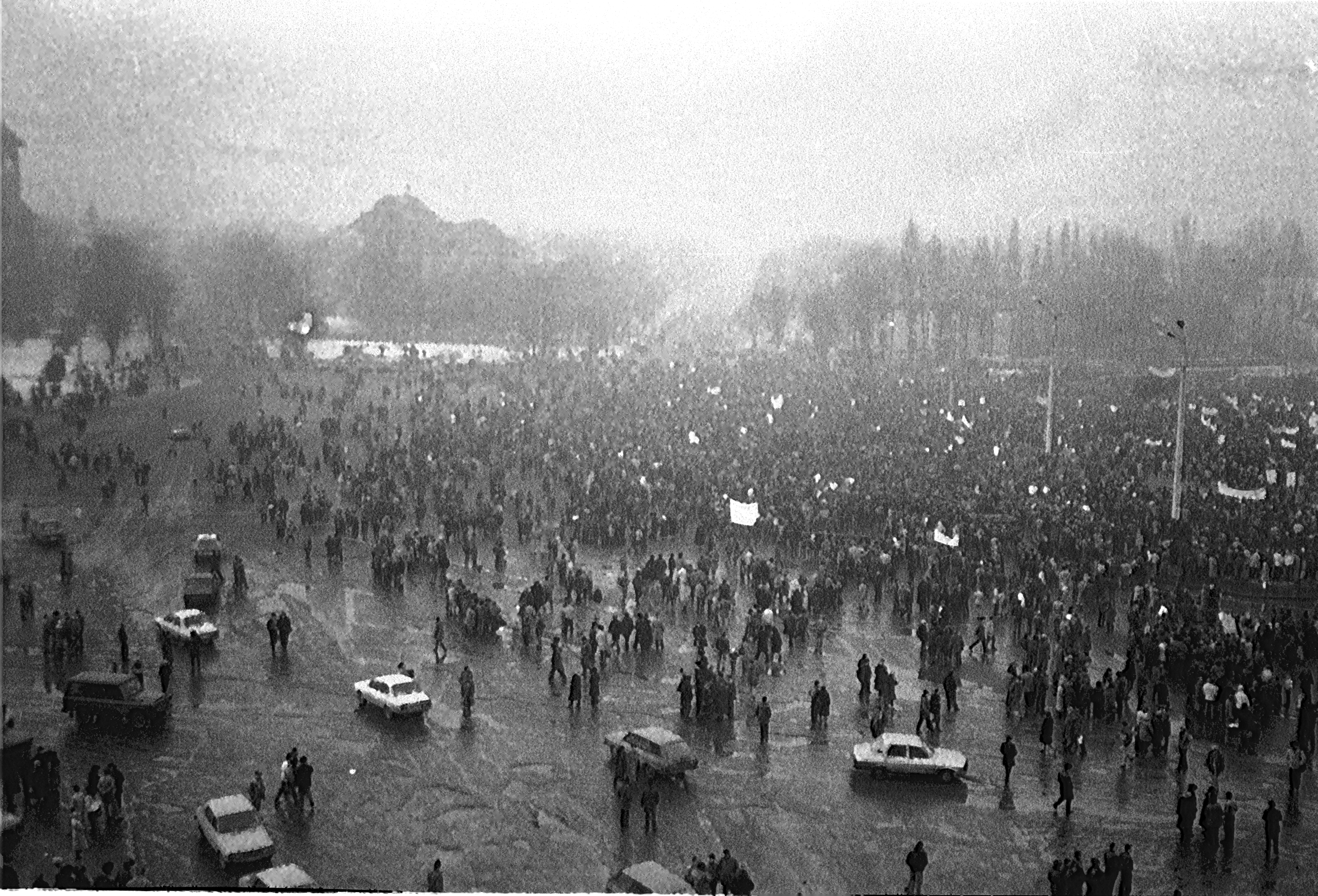
Bucharest meeting, February 1990

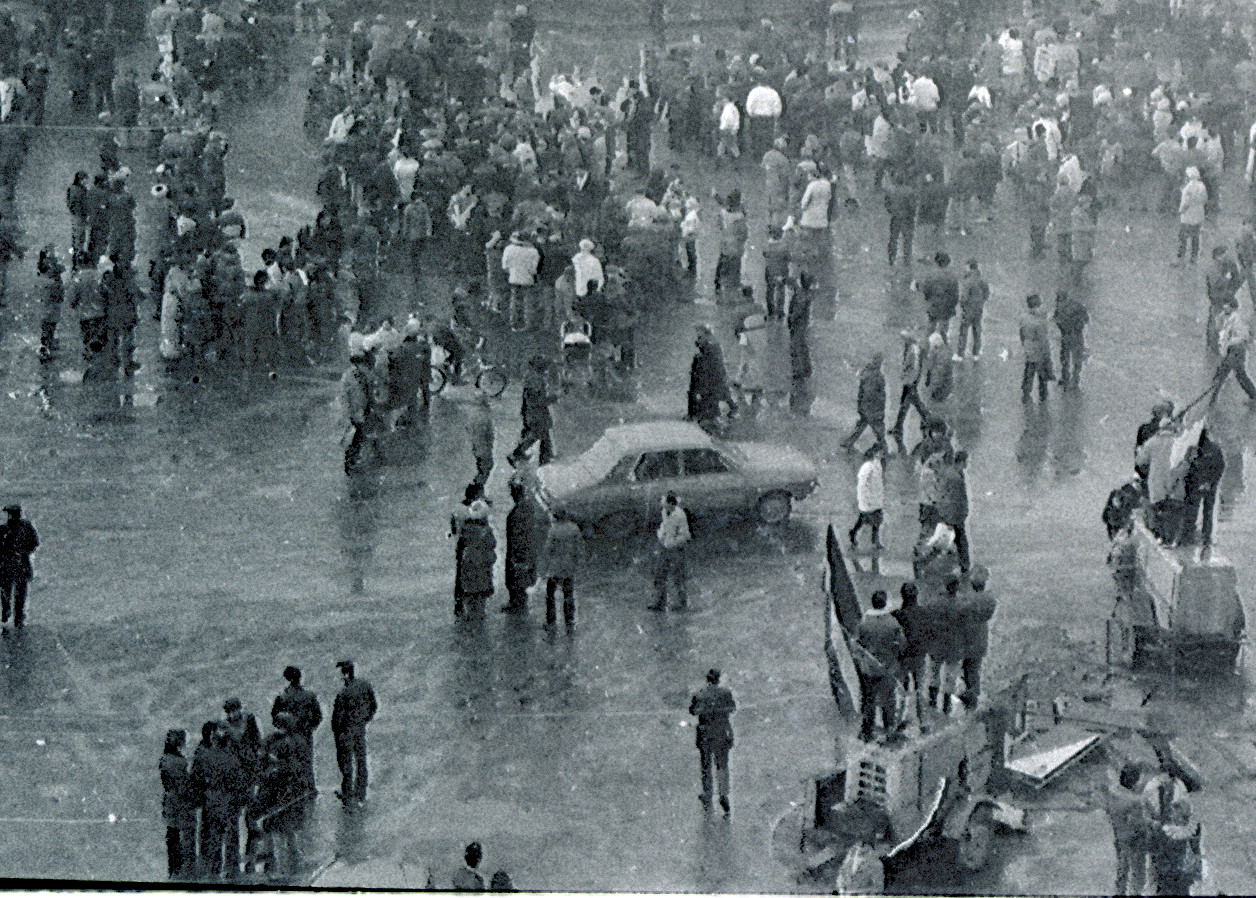
Bucharest meeting, February 1990

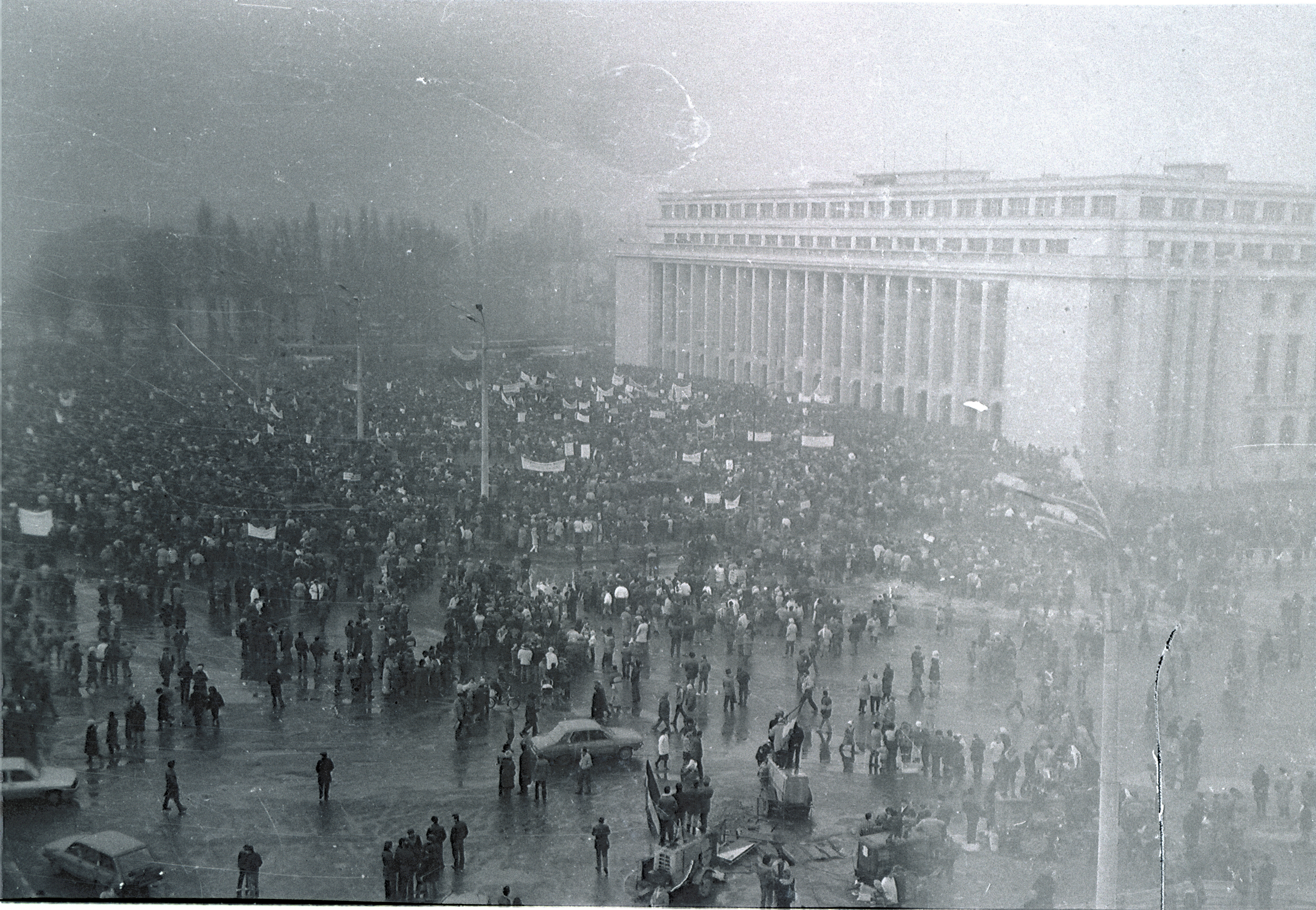
Bucharest government building, February 1990

Less than a month after the January mineriad, another anti-communist manifestation took place in Bucharest on 18 February. Despite the demonstrators' pleas to non-violence, several persons started throwing stones into the Government building. Riot police and army forces intervened to restore order, and on the same night, 4,000 miners headed to Bucharest.

Opposition leaders and independent media speculated that the demonstration was manipulated by the Securitate and the FSN. Miners maintained their relative innocence of the violence, claiming that the agitation and most of the brutality was the work of Iliescu's government agents who had infiltrated and disguised themselves as miners.

== June 1990 mineriad ==
The Romanian miners of the Jiu Valley were called by the newly elected power to Bucharest to end the riots that broke up on 13 June 1990. As President Ion Iliescu put it, the miners were called to save the "besieged democratic regime" and restore order and democracy in Bucharest. The government trucked in thousands of miners from the Jiu Valley to Bucharest to confront the demonstrators. The rest of Romania and the world watched the government television broadcasts of miners and other unionized workers brutally grappling with students and other protesters.

Over the course of a month-long demonstration in University Square, many protesters had gathered with the goal of attaining official recognition for the 8th demand of the popular Proclamation of Timișoara, which stated that communists and former communists (including President Iliescu himself) should be prevented from holding official functions. Supporters of the opposition were dissatisfied with Iliescu's first government, which was made up mostly of former communists, claiming that it implemented reforms very slowly or not at all. The protests mostly ended after Iliescu’s FSN obtained a decisive victory (over two thirds of the votes) in the 20 May elections. However, a small group decided to continue protests and staged a hunger strike. Following attempts of the authorities to clear up the University Square, where the protesters had been squatting during the previous months, some among the protesters grew violent and attacked the police headquarters and the national television station. When the police were unable to contain the violence, Iliescu appealed to the miners to "defend the country". Special trains transported some 10,000 miners to the capital, where the miners violently confronted anyone they saw as opposing the government.

The official figures state that during the third mineriad, seven people were killed and more than a thousand were wounded. In contrast to state statistics, the opposition newspaper România Liberă claimed that on 29 June 1990 over 40 bodies were buried in a common grave in Străulești, near Bucharest. Conspiracy theories and rumors circulated as to the origins and development of the mineriad, with some believing that both the Romanian Presidency and Secret Service had a hand in it. Later parliamentary inquiries into the potential role of the Secret Service contributed to the widespread public mistrust of the post-Ceaușescu intelligence service.

Government inquiries would show that the miners had indeed been "joined by vigilantes who were later credibly identified as former officers of the Securitate", and that for two days, the miners had been aided and abetted by the former Securitate members in their violent confrontation with the protesters and other targets.

== September 1991 mineriad ==
=== 24 September ===
On 24 September, 1991, the miners from the Jiu Valley began a general strike and requested that Prime Minister Petre Roman visit Petroșani to listen to their grievances. The trade union leader Miron Cozma warned representatives of the Government that if the miners' dissatisfactions were not resolved as demanded, the miners will come in large numbers to Bucharest. During this time the sub-prefect, Ionel Botoroagă, and the director of the Autonomous Directorate of Oil, Benone Costinaș, were assaulted in the Petroșani town hall. A group of miners then went to the Petroșani train station, where they demanded and were refused the use of trains for the miners to travel to Bucharest.

=== 25 September ===
On the morning of 25 September, around 10.00 am, the miners from the Jiu Valley arrived at Băneasa railway station on several trains. Upon hearing the news that the miners were heading to the capital, the Prime Minister and President Ion Iliescu unsuccessfully tried several maneuvers to prevent them from reaching their destination. Led by the miners' union leader, Miron Cozma, the first stop was made in Victory Square, where the miners asked for a meeting with Prime Minister Petre Roman. When he did not appear, they asked for his resignation. Roman then agreed and met with a delegation of miners. Cornel Tomescu, head of the sector within the General Secretariat of the Government, said that upon arrival in Victory Square, the miners were not violent. "The miners were calm, they did not shout slogans to the Government or the president and they were sitting on the sidewalk." During this period, altercations with counter-protesters and security forces broke out. A Government building was attacked by some groups, leading to the evacuation of the building. In the evening, the miners, led by Cozma, headed towards the Romanian Television and University Square. They then went to the Cotroceni Palace to discuss with President Ion Iliescu the conditions under which they were willing to withdraw. Cozma demanded the dismissal of Prime Minister Roman in exchange for a cessation of the miners' protest.

=== 26 September ===
On 26 September, the miners attacked the Government building with new forces and called for the Government to be dismissed. Representatives of the miners met for private talks with government officials. Miron Cozma threatened that if by 12:00 PM the resignation of the prime minister was not announced, he would call 40,000 trade unionists from Pipera, adding that probably no one wants a civil war. At 12:00, Alexandru Bârlădeanu, the president of the Senate, announced on the public television the dismissal of the Romanian government. The mining union leader asked the miners to go home because their claims had been resolved. In the afternoon of that day, the miners entered the Assembly Hall of the Chamber of Deputies and requested the resignation of President Ion Iliescu and the resolution of all the claims for which they came to Bucharest. Following discussion, the miners returned to the Jiu Valley with the promise that their demands would be addressed. Two days later Miron Cozma and the president of the country Ion Iliescu signed a statement that formally ended the mineriad.

== January and February 1999 mineriads ==
The Jiu Valley miners left again for Bucharest, unhappy with the governmental reduction of the subsidies, which would result in the closing of the mines. The barricade installed by the gendarmes at Costești was crossed by the miners and near Râmnicu Vâlcea a Gendarmerie unit was ambushed by the miners. Reaching Râmnicu Vâlcea, they sequestered the prefect of Vâlcea County. Radu Vasile, Prime Minister at the time, negotiated an agreement with Miron Cozma, the miners' leader, at the Cozia Monastery, nearby.

On 14 February 1999, Cozma was found guilty for the 1991 mineriad and sentenced for 18 years in prison. The miners led by Cozma left for Bucharest attempting a new mineriad, only this time they were stopped by the police at Stoenești, Olt County. In the clash that followed, 100 policemen and 70 miners were wounded and at least one miner died. Cozma was arrested and sent to a prison in Rahova.

== Legal issues ==
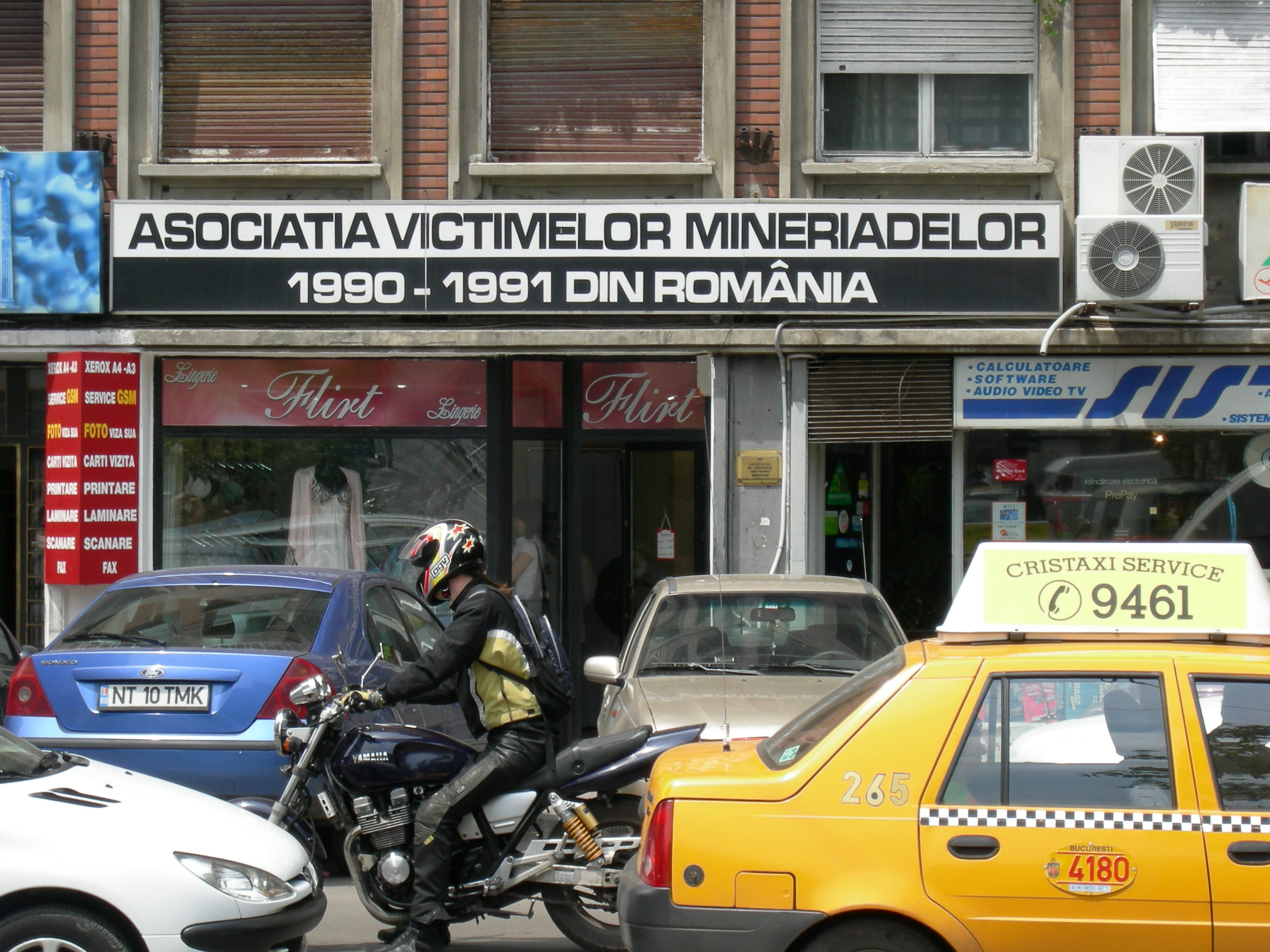
Association of Victims of the Mineriads

Ion Iliescu pardoned Cozma's sentence on 15 December 2004, a few days before his term ended, but revoked the decision two days later, having faced the outrage of Romanian and international media and politicians.

Cozma successfully challenged the legality of the withdrawal of the pardoning, and on 14 June 2005 he was freed by the Judge Court of Dolj County. However, on 28 September 2005, Cozma was sentenced by the Romanian High Court of Cassation and Justice to serve 10 years in prison for the January 1999 Mineriad, which included time already served. His request to be released on parole was denied on 2 June 2006. After serving the full term, Cozma was finally released on 2 December 2007, but was restricted from returning to either Petroșani or Bucharest.

== See also ==
- League of Miners Unions of the Jiu Valley
- Hard Hat Riot
