= January 1999 Mineriad =

Protest in Romania in January 1999

1999 Romanian Coup d'état attempt
- Part of the mineriads
- Date: 4–23 January 1999

Parties
Government of Romania	Jiu Valley miners Greater Romania Party; Political support: PDSR, PUNR, PS

Lead figures
Emil Constantinescu; Radu Vasile; Constantin Degeratu	Miron Cozma; Corneliu Vadim Tudor

The 1999 Romanian Coup d'état attempt also called the January 1999 Mineriad was led by miners in Romania against low wages under the leadership of Miron Cozma in January 1999. Protesters marched onto Bucharest and other cities, demonstrating the government's wage policies and low wages, demanding an increase of the wages and better working conditions in the country.
Emil Constantinescu declared that historians are stubborn and use the word mineriad instead of Coup d'état attempt. He also emphasises the context of the Serbia-Kosovo conflict, where later the USA intervened and attacked Serbia by air from Romanian airports.

== History ==
The Jiu Valley miners left again for Bucharest, unhappy with the government's reduction of subsidies, which would result in the closing of the mines.Together with the miners who left for Bucharest, there were also members of PUNR, PRM, PDSR and PS. The mineriad was openly supported by the Greater Romania Party (PRM) and by the president of this party, Corneliu Vadim Tudor, who invited the miners to occupy the Romanian Parliament and to dismiss the government. Miron Cozma, the leader of the miners, was also vice-president of the PRM, being in constant contact with the PRM leadership in Bucharest, which was preparing the arrival of miners in the Romanian capital. According to the Romanian Intelligence Service, PRM contacted the Chinese Communist Party before the strike and the Chinese communists promised financial help to Corneliu Vadim Tudor if he takes over the government of Romania. Ion Iliescu and the Social Democracy Party of Romania (PDSR) endorsed the mineriad (PDSR first-vicepresident Adrian Năstase compared Miron Cozma with a hajduk during a speech), but they were not directly involved in it, unlike the PRM.

The miners crossed the barricade installed by the gendarmes at Costești. Near Râmnicu Vâlcea, a Gendarmerie unit was ambushed by the miners. After reaching Râmnicu Vâlcea, they sequestered the prefect of Vâlcea County.

Emil Constantinescu declared that one of the objectives was his assassination.

Emil Constantinescu declared that a recorded tape was presented to him by the SRI, where Dan Iosif was recorded making a phone call to Ion Iliescu and saying "our snipers are ready, and when Emil Constantinescu arrives at University Square we will eliminate him". Iliescu answered "Dan be nice, something like this can't be done, please be nice...", to which Dan Iosif responds back "ok daddy, we will cancel the order". Emil Constantinescu summoned Iliescu to his office where they discussed the tape, but took no action against him.

Emil Constantinescu called the heads of all political parties (except Corneliu Vadim Tudor) and held a meeting where they agreed to declare a "State of Emergency" within Romania. After that, Emil Constantinescu called General Constantin Degeratu and ordered him to deploy tanks and other means necessary to block the mob. Then he ordered Radu Vasile to go to Cozia to negotiate a peace, having a mandate to approve any union demands, but not allowed to promise legal immunity.
Emil Constantinescu declared he did not pursue any action against Dan Iosif because of respect for other positive actions he had done.

Radu Vasile, prime minister at the time, negotiated an agreement with Miron Cozma, the miners' leader, at the nearby Cozia Monastery.

On 14 February 1999, Cozma was found guilty of organizing the mineriad, and he was sentenced to 18 years in prison. According to the indictment, the mineriad also received support from Russia. The miners led by Cozma left for Bucharest to attempt another mineriad, but this time, they were stopped by the police at Stoenești, Olt County. In the clash that followed, 100 policemen and 70 miners were wounded, and one miner died. Cozma was arrested and sent to a prison in Rahova.

The January 1999 Mineriad was described in the Romanian press as a coup d'etat attempt.

Emil Constantinescu declared that historians are stubborn and often use the word mineriad instead of Coup d'état attempt.
