= History of Romania (1989–present) =

Period of time after the execution of Nicolae Ceaușescu

Following the Romanian Revolution which toppled Romania's hardline Communist government and the execution of dictator Nicolae Ceaușescu in December 1989, the National Salvation Front seized power, led by Ion Iliescu. The Front transformed itself into a political party in short time and overwhelmingly won the general election of May 1990, with Iliescu as president. The first half of 1990 was marked protests, some of them violent. Most notable was the brutal intervention of coal miners of the Jiu Valley, called in to suppress rioting in central Bucharest.

Subsequently, the Romanian government undertook a programme of free market economic reforms and privatization, following a gradualist line rather than shock therapy throughout the early and mid 1990s. Economic reforms have continued, although there was little economic growth until the 2000s. Social reforms soon after the revolution included easing of the former restrictions on contraception and abortion. Later governments implemented further social policy changes.

Political reforms have been based on a new democratic constitution adopted in 1991. The FSN split that year, beginning a period of coalition governments that lasted until 2000, when Iliescu's Social Democratic Party (then the Party of Social Democracy in Romania, PDSR, now PSD), returned to power and Iliescu again became President, with Adrian Năstase as Prime Minister. This government fell in the 2004 elections amid allegations of corruption, and was succeeded by further unstable coalitions which have been subject to similar allegations.

In recent years, Romania has become more closely integrated with Western institutions, becoming a member of the North Atlantic Treaty Organization (NATO) in 2004 and of the European Union (EU) in 2007.

Following political instability in the wake of the cancellation of the 2024 presidential election due to alleged Russian interference favouring first round winner Călin Georgescu, a new election has held in May 2025 with Nicușor Dan assuming the presidency.

== Revolution ==
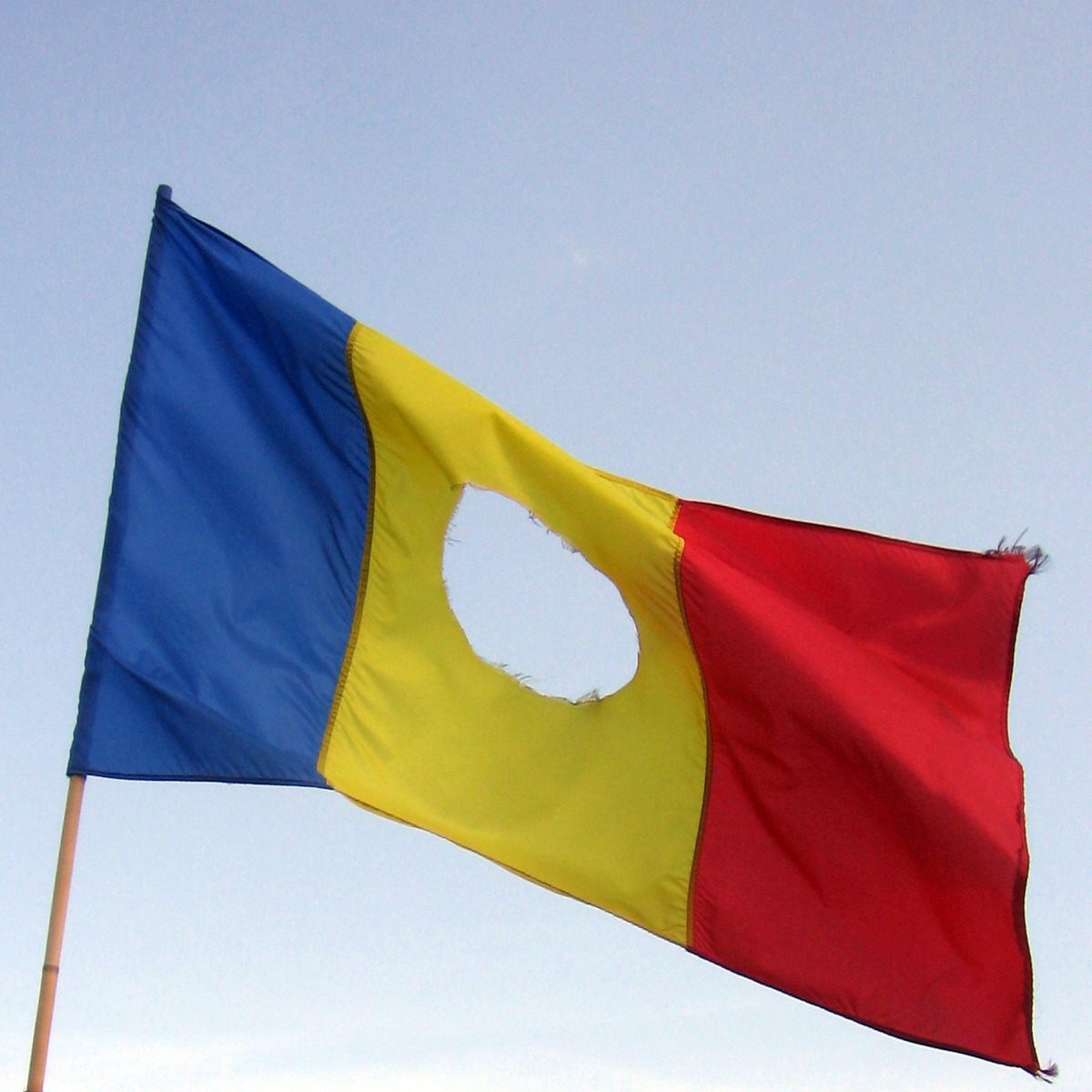
Romanian flag with a hole in the center, as used in 1989; photo made during an anti-government demonstration in Bucharest in September 2006

1989 marked the fall of Communism in Eastern Europe. A mid-December protest in Timișoara against the eviction of a Hungarian minister (László Tőkés) grew into a country-wide protest against the Ceaușescu régime, sweeping the dictator from power.

On 21 December, President Nicolae Ceaușescu had his apparatus gather a mass-meeting in Bucharest downtown in an attempt to rally popular support for his regime and publicly condemn the mass protests of Timișoara. This meeting mirrored the mass-meeting gathered in 1968 when Ceaușescu had spoken out against the invasion of Czechoslovakia by the Warsaw Pact countries. This time, however, the people turned angry and riot broke out. During the events of the following week, marked by confusion and street fighting, it is estimated that 1,051 people lost their lives. Ceaușescu was arrested in Târgoviște. After a summary trial by a kangaroo court, he and his wife were executed on 25 December. Most members of the government, as well as a limited number of lower level officials were convicted for perpetrating or enabling the violence in trials that lasted several years.

During the Romanian Revolution, power was taken by a group called the National Salvation Front (FSN), which gathered dissidents, both from within the Communist Party and non-affiliated. The FSN quickly assumed the mission of restoring civil order and immediately took democratic measures. The Communist Party was de facto banned, and Ceaușescu's most unpopular measures, such as bans on abortion and contraception, were rolled back.

== 1990–1996 ==
In the aftermath of the revolution, several parties which claimed to be successors of pre-World War II parties were formed. The most successful were the Christian Democratic National Peasants' Party (PNȚ-CD), the National Liberal Party (PNL), and the Romanian Social Democrat Party (PSDR). Their leadership was made of former political prisoners of the 1950s, repatriated émigrés, and people which had had no held top positions in the Romanian Communist Party (PCR). As a reaction, the FSN declared it would participate in the elections as a political party. The announcement triggered a series of anti-government demonstrations in Bucharest. The already tense situation was aggravated by press campaigns. The newspapers, assuming either a strong pro-government or strong pro-opposition stance, issued attacks and tried to discredit the opposing side. The FSN, having a better organisational structure, and controlling the state administration, used the press still controlled by the state in its own advantage. FSN also organised counter-manifestations, gathering the support of the blue-collar workers in the numerous factories of Bucharest. As the anti-government protesters started to charge the Palace of the Parliament, more groups of workers from around the country poured into Bucharest to protect the fragile government. The most notable among these groups where the coal miners of the Jiu Valley, known in Romania for their 1977 strike against the Ceaușescu regime. The workers attacked the offices of opposition parties, however the government intervened and succeeded in re-establishing the order. These events were to be known as the January 1990 Mineriad, the first of the Mineriads.

On 28 February, less than a month later, another anti-government demonstration in Bucharest ended again with a confrontation between demonstrators and coal miners. This time, despite the demonstrators' pleas for non-violence, several people started throwing stones at the Government building. Riot police and army forces intervened to restore order, and on the same night, 4,000 miners rushed into Bucharest. This incident is known as the Mineriad of February 1990.

Presidential and parliamentary elections were held on 20 May 1990. Iliescu won with almost 90% of the popular vote and thus became the first elected President of Romania. The FSN also secured more than two-thirds of the seats in Parliament. Petre Roman, a professor at the Polytechnic University of Bucharest, son of Valter Roman, a Communist official and veteran of the Spanish Civil War, remained Prime-Minister (position he held immediately after the Revolution). The new government, which included some former low-key members of the Communist party, promised the implementation of some free market reforms.

During the spring 1990 electoral campaign, the opposition parties organised a massive sit-in protest in down-town Bucharest, later known as the Golaniad. After the FSN won an overwhelming majority, most of the Bucharest protesters dispersed, however less than a hundred chose to remain in the square. The police efforts to evict them and re-establish traffic in central Bucharest two weeks after the elections was met with violence, and several state institutions were attacked (among them the Bucharest Police and the Interior Ministry). The freshly elected president, Ion Iliescu, issued a call to Romania's population to come and defend the government from further attacks. The main group to answer the call were the coal miners of Jiu Valley, leading to the June 1990 Mineriad. The miners and other groups physically confronted the demonstrators and forcibly cleared University Square. After the situation calmed down, president Iliescu publicly thanked the miners for their help in restoring order in Bucharest, and requested their return to the Jiu Valley. The general national and international media portrayal of the miners involvement in these events have been disputed by the miners, who claimed that most of the violence was perpetrated by government agents that were agitating the crowds; these claims, and a growing public suspicion of the sequence and orchestration of events, led to Parliamentary and other inquiries. Parliamentary inquiries showed that members of the government intelligence services were involved in the instigation and manipulation of both the protesters and the miners, and later, in June 1994, a Bucharest court found two former Securitate officers guilty of ransacking and stealing $100,000 from the house of a leading opposition politician.

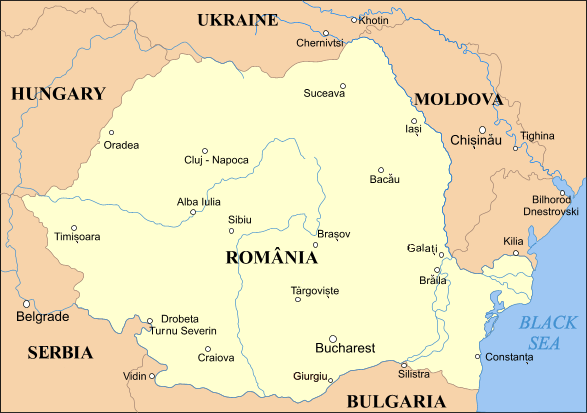
Romania in 2008

In December 1991, a new constitution was drafted and subsequently adopted, after a popular referendum. March 1992 marked the split of the FSN into two groups: the Democratic National Salvation Front (FDSN), led by Ion Iliescu and the Democratic Party (PD), led by Petre Roman. Iliescu won the presidential elections in September 1992 by a clear margin, and his FDSN won the general elections held at the same time. With parliamentary support from the nationalist Romanian National Unity Party (PUNR), Greater Romania Party (PRM), and the ex-communist Socialist Party of Labour (PSM), a new government was formed in November 1992 under Prime Minister Nicolae Văcăroiu, an economist and former bureaucrat during the Ceaușescu administration. The government took some limited steps towards the liberalisation of the market, started a privatisation program through management employee buyouts and sought to further relations with the Euro-Atlantic structures (the EEC/EU and NATO; the Snagov Declaration of 21 June 1995 committed the Romanian parliamentary political parties to Romania's accession to the EU). The FDSN changed its name to Party of Social Democracy in Romania (PDSR) in July 1993 after the merger with several smaller left-wing parties. This coalition dissolved before the November 1996 elections. This coincided with the bankruptcy of the Caritas pyramid scheme, a major scandal at the time in Romania.

=== Economy ===
Data from unless otherwise specified.

	1989	1990	1991	1992	1993	1994	1995	1996
GDP in billions of US$	53.7	38.3	28.9	19.6	26.4	30.1	35.5	35.3
Real change in GDP	-5.8%	-5.6%	-12.9%	-8.8%	1.5%	3.9%	7.1%	4.1%
Budget deficit (% of GDP)	7.5%	0.3%	-1.9%	-4.4%	-2.6%	-4.2%	-4.1%	-4.9%
Current account (% of GDP) and exports / imports (in billions of US$)	5.6% 10.5 / 8.4	-8.7% 5.8 / 9.2	-3.5% 4.3 / 5.7	-8.0% 4.3 / 6.2	-4.5% 4.9 / 6.5	-1.4% 6.2 / 7.1	-5.0% 7.9 / 10.3	-7.3% 8.1 / 11.4
Largest economic sector (% of GDP)	Industry (46.2%)	Industry (40.5%)	Industry (37.9%)	Services (40.6%)	Services (37.0%)	Industry (36.2%)	Services (36.1%)	Services (36.7%)
Share of the private sector (% of GDP)	?	16.4%	23.6%	26.4%	34.8%	38.9%	45.3%	54.9%
Unemployment rate	—N/a	—N/a	3.0%	8.2%	10.4%	10.9%	9.5%	6.6%
Total external debt (in billions of US$)	0.0	0.2	2.2	3.5	4.5	5.5	6.7	9.2
Public debt (% of GDP)	?	1.0% (lowest in the world)	2.7% (lowest in the world)	11.1% (6th lowest in the world)	11.7% (6th lowest in the world)	14.4% (9th lowest in the world)	?	?
External public debt (% of GDP)	?	?	?	?	?	13.95%	13.80%	?
Average gross monthly wage (US$)	?	?	?	$83 (nominal)	?	$86 (nominal) $255 (PPP)	$104 (nominal) $285 (PPP)	$104 (nominal) $305 (PPP)

== 1996–2000 ==
Emil Constantinescu of the Romanian Democratic Convention (CDR) won the second round of the 1996 Romanian presidential elections by a comfortable margin of 9% and thus replaced Iliescu as chief of state.

PDSR won the largest number of seats in Parliament, but was unable to form a viable coalition. Constituent parties of the CDR joined the Democratic Party (PD) and the Democratic Alliance of Hungarians in Romania (UDMR) to form a centrist coalition government, holding 60% of the seats in Parliament. This coalition of sorts frequently struggled for survival, as decisions were often delayed by long periods of negotiations among the involved parties. Nevertheless, this coalition was able to implement some reforms. The new coalition government, under prime minister Victor Ciorbea remained in office until March 1998, when Radu Vasile (PNȚ-CD) took over as prime minister. The period was marked by frequent quarrels inside the coalition, dubious bankruptcy of several major banks, and a general economic downturn. Deteriorating living conditions provoked a new mineriad in 1999. After several battles with the police on the road towards Bucharest, Radu Vasile succeeded in convincing miners' leader Miron Cozma to back down, and send the miners home. A political independent, Mugur Isărescu, the governor of the National Bank, eventually replaced Radu Vasile as head of the government, helping stabilise the Romanian economy significantly affected by the previous governments.

== 2000–2004 ==
Iliescu's Social Democratic Party, now renamed the Party of Social Democracy in Romania (PDSR), returned to power in the 2000 elections, and Iliescu won a second constitutional term as the country's president. Adrian Năstase became the Prime Minister of the newly formed government. The opposition frequently accused the government of corruption and attempts to control the press. The government was also accused of allowing local elected leaders of the PSD to gain significant influence over the administration of their region, which allegedly used the newly found power for personal interests. Nevertheless, the Romanian economy witnessed the first years of growth after the 1989 revolution. The government also started several projects for social housing, restarted the construction of the motorway connecting Bucharest to Romania's main port, Constanţa, and began the construction of a motorway across the western region of Transylvania. These projects however only had limited success due to generalized corruption under the already well placed 2nd and 3rd rank ex-members of the former Communist Party.

In the aftermath of the attacks against the US on 11 September 2001, Romania backed the US on its "war on terrorism", giving overflight rights to the USAF during the US invasion of Afghanistan. The country's military also actively participated both in the NATO-led International Security Assistance Force and the US-led Operation Enduring Freedom. In 2004, Romania was finally accepted as a full member of NATO. The Năstase government also took steps towards European integration, although the path was set by the ex-president, Constantinescu. The government successfully finalised negotiations with the European Union on most subjects, and 2007 was set as a tentative date for admission into the Union.

== Băsescu presidency (2004–2014) ==
Presidential and parliamentary elections took place again on 28 November 2004. No political party was able to secure a viable parliamentary majority. There was no winner in the first round of the presidential elections. Finally, the joint PNL-PD candidate, Traian Băsescu, won the second round on 12 December 2004 with 51% of the vote and thus became the third post-revolutionary president of Romania.

The PNL leader, Călin Popescu-Tăriceanu, was assigned the difficult task of building a coalition government excluding the PSD. In December 2004, the new coalition government (PD, PNL, PUR and UDMR) under prime minister Tăriceanu was sworn in. Soon disputes appeared between the parties of the coalition. Prime minister Tăriceanu, leader of the PNL, and president Băsescu, constitutionally independent but generally regarded as de facto leader of the PD, accused each other of supporting illegitimate business interests. The PUR left the coalition after Băsescu declared that the party's participation in the coalition was an "immoral solution", leaving the government with limited support in the Parliament. The frequent disputes between the prime-minister and the president also caused a faction of the PNL supportive of Băsescu to split and form the Liberal Democratic Party (Romania).

Romania joined the European Union, alongside Bulgaria, on 1 January 2007.

The disputes between the PNL prime minister and the president ultimately led to the expulsion of the PD ministers from the government. The PNL and UDMR formed a minority government, with intermittent support in Parliament on behalf of the PSD. As the conflict between the president and parliamentary parties continued, in May 2007, the PNL, PSD, PC (former PUR), and UDMR voted to impeach Băsescu for alleged violations of the constitutions. Nicolae Văcăroiu, the president of the Senate became ad interim president, however Băsescu was reinstated as a national referendum turned down the proposal to depose him. The relations between the president and the parliamentary parties other than PDL (formed after PD and PLD merged) remained tense for the following two years. EU membership and the reduced government powers favoured foreign investment and the Romanian economy.

In late 2008, the government lost the legislative elections, while PSD and PDL won roughly the same number of seats. An uneasy coalition was set up between the two parties, with the PDL president, Emil Boc, as prime-minister. Scandals soon erupted, with the PSD Interior minister changing several times amid allegations of corruption. The PDL youth minister was forced to resign after a Parliamentary commission accused her of siphoning government money towards the European Parliament campaign of Elena Băsescu, the president's daughter. Accusation of funds mismanagement were also made against the PDL minister of tourism, Elena Udrea, a close ally of the president. In autumn 2008, during the electoral campaign for the November Presidential elections, the PSD accused coalition party PDL of planning to rig the elections in favour of Traian Băsescu. As a result, Emil Boc expelled the PSD minister of interior from the government, and PSD left the coalition in protest. Soon after, the Parliament approved a motion of no confidence, dismissing the PDL government. The Parliament also voted down two PDL government proposed by Traian Băsescu, and insisted on the creation of a PSD-PNL-UDMR government headed by FDGR/DFDR-member Klaus Iohannis, a proposition turned down by Băsescu. Traian Băsescu succeeded to narrowly win the second round of the presidential election, against PSD candidate Mircea Geoană. Emil Boc was reinstated as prime-minister in a PDL-UDMR government, with the help of splinter groups of PSD and PNL. In late 2009 and 2010 Romania was heavily hit by the worldwide economic crisis, causing several massive protests organised by trade unions. The opposition and the press frequently accused the government of preferential allocation of funds to its members, as well as generalised corruption.

In 2009, President Traian Basescu was re-elected for a second five-year term as the President of Romania.

In January 2014, Romania's supreme court sentenced former prime minister Adrian Năstase, who held office between 2000 and 2004, to four years in prison for taking bribe.

== Iohannis presidency (2014–2025) ==
In 2014, Klaus Iohannis was elected as the President of Romania, and he was re-elected by a landslide victory in 2019.

In December 2020, that month's parliamentary election was won by the then oppositional Social Democrats (PSD). Former prime minister Ludovic Orban resigned because of the defeat of his National Liberal Party (PNL). However, Florin Cîțu, a member of the National Liberal Party (PNL) who became its president following the September 2021 congress, became the new prime minister, forming a three party, center-right coalition consisting of the PNL, the USR PLUS (now simply legally known as USR), and the Democratic Alliance of Hungarians in Romania (UDMR). In early October 2021, the Cîțu Cabinet was ousted on many grounds by the Parliament in the process of the 2021 Romanian political crisis. USR PLUS (now USR) decided to leave the cabinet in early September due to the national liberals' tremendous corruption. In late November, a grand coalition consisting of the PSD, PNL, and UDMR was instated under former army general Nicolae Ciucă, the incumbent Prime Minister of his namesake cabinet. Romania’s new prime minister Nicolae Ciucă formed a coalition government between former arch rivals, his own center-right National Liberal Party (PNL) and center-left Social Democratic Party (PSD). PNL has eight ministers, PSD nine and three from the ethnic Hungarian UDMR group. Since the cabinet's investment, Romania experienced a shift towards authoritarianism and illiberalism, as well as an increased corruption. On 15 June 2023, Marcel Ciolacu (PSD) was sworn in as the new Romanian Prime Minister. Rotating premiership had been long agreed as part of a deal by the ruling coalition.

== Dan presidency (2025–present) ==
On 18 May 2025, independent candidate Nicușor Dan won the second round of the 2025 presidential election against George Simion from the Alliance for the Union of Romanians, being inaugurated president on 26 May of that year.

== See also ==
- Romanian property bubble
