= Caracal (river) =

Caracal Mărioara
- Location within Romania

Location
- Country: Romania
- Counties: Dolj County, Olt County
- Cities and villages: Zănoaga, Drăghiceni, Caracal, Stoenești

Physical characteristics
- Mouth: Olt
  - location: Stoenești
  - coordinates: 44.0982°N 24.5208°E
- Length: 31 km (19 mi)
- Basin size: 121 km^{2} (47 sq mi)

Basin features
- Progression: Olt→ Danube→ Black Sea
- Tributaries
  - right: Gologan
- River code: VIII.1.176

The Caracal is a right tributary of the river Olt in Romania. It flows into the Olt in Stoenești. Its length is 31 km (19 mi) and its basin size is 121 km^{2} (47 sq mi).
