= Miron Cozma =

Criminal

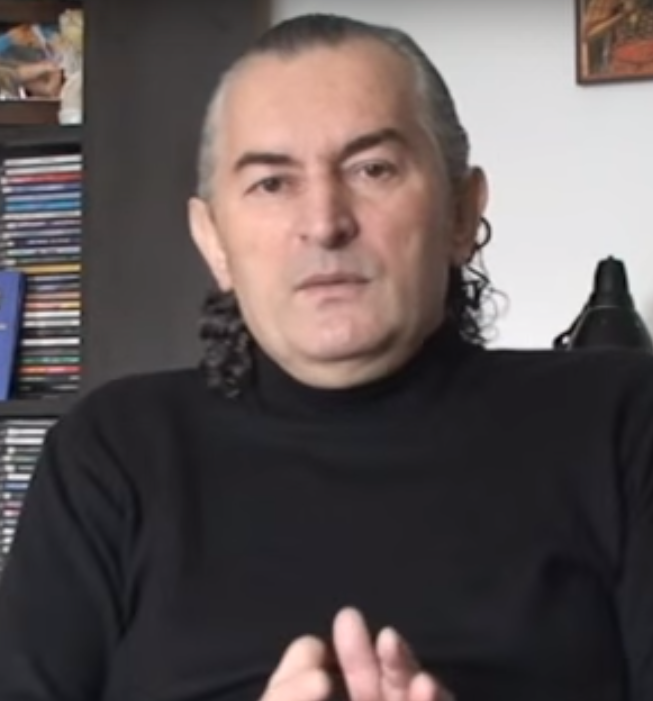
Miron Cozma

Miron Cozma (born August 25, 1954) is a former Romanian labor-union organizer and politician, and leader of Romania's Jiu Valley coal miners' union. He is best known for his leading the miners of the Jiu Valley during the September 1991 Mineriad which overthrew the reformist Petre Roman government. Cozma was a controversial character in the 1990s, both within and outside of Jiu Valley.

In 2011, he re-entered in politics and founded Worker's Social Democratic Party, after he was vicepresident of the Greater Romania Party during the 1990s.

== Early life ==
Born in Derna, Bihor, Miron Cozma studied to become an electromechanical assistant engineer. After graduation, he began working as a trainee at the Bărbăteni Mine, while living in Lupeni. He was also the DJ of the town's disco. In 1977, he became an informant for the Securitate, using the code name "Paul", sending memos about co-workers until 1983.

== Trade union leadership ==
In 1990, Cozma was working at the Lonea Coal Mine, being involved in the January 1990 Mineriad, when he was one of the 16 miners who were involved in talks with President Iliescu and the prime minister. On 21–24 March 1990, the League of Miners Unions of the Jiu Valley elected Cozma as its leader.

In 1991, Cozma's companies gained a monopoly in food retail in the mines of the Jiu Valley, which gave him substantial profits and influence.

On 19 June 1991, Cozma ran over and killed a 31-year-old woman, Roza Violeta Drăghici, in the village of Paroșeni, Vulcan, Hunedoara, doing an irregular overtaking. He was convicted of manslaughter and given a 2-years suspended sentence; the lenient sentence may have been caused by the close relationship of Cozma with the ruling National Salvation Front.

== 1999 Mineriads and imprisonment ==
In January 1999, Cozma led another series of miner protests, sparked by the Radu Vasile government's intention to close down several money-losing mines in the Jiu Valley region. Intending to put pressure on the government, Cozma and his miners started marching towards Bucharest. The mineriad was openly supported by the Greater Romania Party (PRM) and by the president of this party, Corneliu Vadim Tudor, who invited the miners to occupy the Romanian Parliament and to topple the government. Miron Cozma, the leader of the miners, was also vice-president of the PRM, being in constant contact with the PRM leadership in Bucharest, which was preparing the arrival of miners in the Romanian capital. The miners clashed with the Gendarmerie at Costeşti, Vâlcea County; about 70 miners and 100 gendarmes were wounded and one miner died. Soon after, Prime Minister Radu Vasile held talks with Cozma at the Cozia Monastery, and Cozma agreed to end the protest and disband the miner units.

At the beginning of February of the same year, however, Cozma was sentenced by the Supreme Court of Justice to 18 years in prison for his involvement in the 1991 mineriad. This quickly prompted a new march of the miners towards Bucharest. This time, special forces intervened and dispersed the miners at Stoeneşti, Olt County. Cozma and his lieutenants were captured by the police; Cozma himself was taken to the Rahova prison to serve his term.

He was pardoned by Romanian President Ion Iliescu on December 15, 2004, only a few days before the end of the latter's final term in office. However, Iliescu revoked the pardon on December 16, stating that "it was a mistake". Yet Cozma was released in June 2005, when the cancellation of his pardon was ruled illegal by the Bucharest Court of Appeal. In September 2005, he was sentenced by the Romanian Supreme Court to a 10-year term for the January 1999 Mineriad. His sentences overlapped, so as of June 2006 he still had to serve a 13-month concurrent sentence in prison.

On June 2, 2006, Miron Cozma's request to be released on parole was denied by the Parole Commission of the Rahova Penitentiary. A Bucharest court dismissed his appeal against the decision 2 weeks later.

Cozma could have left the prison 6 months before time as recommended by the Parole Commission on January 3, 2007. Although the decision was upheld by a Bucharest court on January 9, it was overturned on appeal on February 20, 2007.

Miron Cozma was finally released on 2 December 2007, with a restriction on entering Petroşani or Bucharest. Upon leaving Rahova, he flew to Timişoara to meet with his family and friends. He stated in his interviews that certain politicians should have been incarcerated as well, adding "Spiritul lui Miron Cozma nu moare!" ("The soul of Miron Cozma will never die!").

In June 2013, Miron Cozma claimed during an interview that the Army had used live rounds against miners.
