= 2025 Rahova gas explosion =

Explosion caused by the accumulation of methane gas in an apartment

- Date: 17 October 2025
- Time: 9:07 a.m. (EEST)
- Venue: Block 32, staircase 2
- Location: 1 Vicina Street, Rahova (5th Sector), Bucharest, Romania; 44°24′31″N 26°4′8″E
- Type: Gas explosion
- Deaths: 3
- Injuries: 20 (15 hospitalized)

On 17 October 2025, a gas explosion occurred at the 5th or 6th floor of an apartment building in the housing estate of Rahova in Bucharest, Romania. The explosion killed 3 people and injured 20 people, 15 of whom required hospitalization.

== Background ==
The explosion occurred at 9:07 am local time in an eight-story apartment building, specifically in Block 32's second staircase (Strada Vicina 1), which was completed in 1981 as part of a systematization program developed in the late 1970s meant to replace old housing stock with new housing stock in Rahova. The block has a total of 108 apartment units (54 per each staircase), in which roughly 400 people resided at the time of the blast.

According to residents of the affected building the first sign of a gas leak occurred as early as 6 October 2025, leading to the residents of the affected building calling the emergency services due to a "strong scent of gas". The previous morning, 24 hours prior to the blast, a gas leak was reported to the emergency services, who proceeded to remotely shut off the gas supply and demanded the intervention of employees of Distrigaz Sud Rețele, who then placed a valve seal. However, by the next day, the scent of gas was still in the building, leading to a complaint from one of the residents at 8:44 am local time on the emergency hotline, around 23 minutes before the explosion occurred. Once a repair crew dispatched by Distrigaz Sud Rețele had arrived, they noticed that the seal that they had placed the day prior on the main solenoid valve had been tampered with.

There is a dispute between Raed Arafat, head of the Department of Emergency Situations (DSU) within the Ministry of Internal Affairs and the National Authority for Energy Regulation (ANRE) regarding the arrival of the repair crew in regards to the timeline of events: Raed Arafat claimed in a press conference that the seal had been broken by the explosion and that the repair crew had arrived either right when, or after the explosion took place, while the ANRE said that the repair crew had arrived just before the explosion happened, although they gave their arrival time at 9:30 am, which was after the explosion.

== Explosion ==
The explosion was strong enough to be recorded on the seismographs of the National Research and Development Institute for the Earth's Physics, reading at 1.2 M_{L}, blowing out both the side walls and the internal walls of a part of the building, with debris damaging the nearby Dimitrie Bolintineanu High School, leading to the evacuation of its students and staff and the cancellation of classes for the rest of the day. The school building was closed afterwards and will remain so until it will be structurally assessed, as one of the load-bearing columns was damaged after the blast.

Prime-minister Ilie Bolojan said that the building will most likely be condemned for demolition, as initial assessments from the State Inspectorate of Constructions and other civil engineers said that the building should be demolished and rebuilt. However the decision is pending a full structural assessment and if possible, the building will be rebuilt using funds from the Ministry of Development. Initial damage assessments rise up to at least 9 million euros, excluding the building's elevators, basement and other utility equipment.

== Victims ==
The explosion killed three people and injured 20 people, of whom 15 needed hospitalization. The three people who died were three women who lived in the apartment building, one of whom was pregnant.

Twenty people were injured, including several teenagers, some of whom were injured by debris and glass shards while attending classes at the nearby Dimitrie Bolintineanu High School. The victims included a 17-year- old girl who fell from the 7th floor to the 5th floor of the apartment building during the explosion, and a 17-year-old boy who was hit in the head by debris falling from the building during the explosion, and who is the brother of the deceased pregnant woman.

== Aftermath ==
Following the explosion, the building was evacuated in its entirety and the surrounding area was sealed off by the emergency services while search and rescue efforts take place. A help center was opened within the site of the Dimitrie Bolintineanu High School.

A criminal case was opened following the disaster by the 5th District Prosecutor's Office, alleging negligent destruction. Immediately after, the police began to conduct hearings, with the first persons brought in for questioning being the building's administrator and the president of the home owners association. The National Authority for Energy Regulation also launched an inquiry into Distrigaz Sud Rețele's actions regarding their handling of the gas leak, as well as the actions of the companies responsible with inspecting and maintaining the gas network.

On 31 October 2025, three people were arrested in relation to the explosion, one belonging to Distrigaz Sud Rețele, the other two belonging to Amproperty Construct SRL, which was the company subcontracted to repair the defects in the gas network. Additionally, the two companies themselves were accused of causing destruction through negligence and failing to properly conduct their legal obligations.

=== Reactions ===
- In an interview at the blast site, Bucharest interim mayor Stelian Bujduveanu stated that "The people responsible for this will be held accountable. It is inadmissible for someone to destroy a safety seal in 2025. This has given us a lot to think about." Additionally he sent out condolences to those affected by the disaster and said that the residents of the affected building will be accommodated in several hotels and relocated to other apartment units, all at the City of Bucharest's expense.
- President Nicușor Dan posted on Facebook his thoughts and prayers to the injured and bereaved and stated that this accident could have been prevented, further stating that anyone involved in this should be held accountable.
