= Radu Vasile =

Prime Minister of Romania (1942–2013)

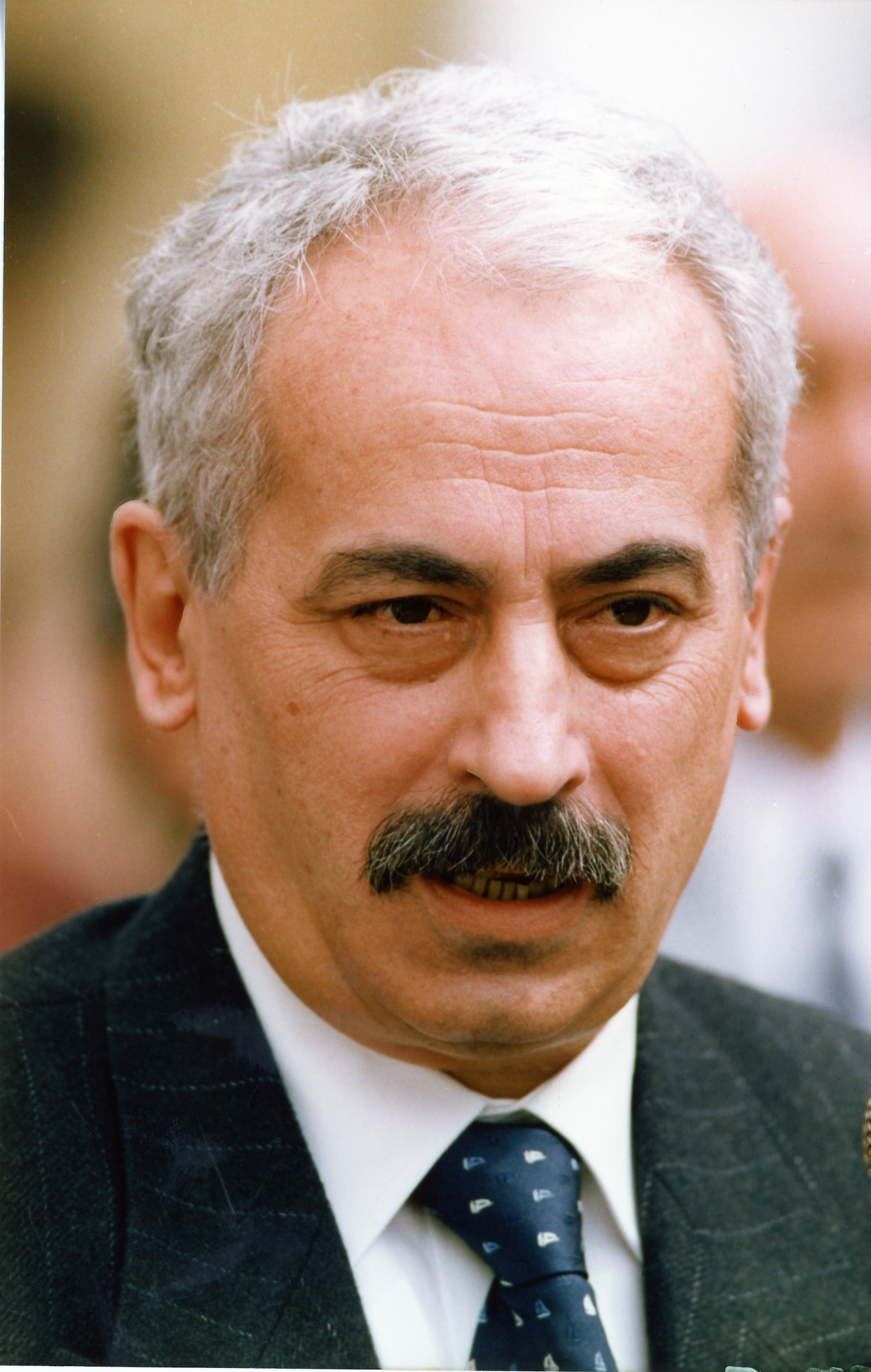

Prime Minister of Romania
- In office 17 April 1998 – 13 December 1999
- President: Emil Constantinescu
- Preceded by: Gavril Dejeu (Acting); Victor Ciorbea
- Succeeded by: Alexandru Athanasiu (Acting); Mugur Isărescu

Secretary-General of the Christian Democratic National Peasants' Party
- In office January 1996 – April 1998

Member of the Senate of Romania
- In office 16 October 1992 – 21 November 1996
- Constituency: Bacău
- In office 22 November 1996 – 10 December 2000
- Constituency: Bucharest
- In office 11 December 2000 – 12 December 2004
- Constituency: Argeș

Personal details
- Born: 10 October 1942 Sibiu, Kingdom of Romania
- Died: 3 July 2013 (aged 70) Bucharest, Romania
- Party: Christian Democratic National Peasants' Party (1989–1999); Independent (1999-2000); People's Party of Romania (2000); Democratic Party (2000–2007); Democratic Liberal Party (2007–2013)
- Spouse: Măriuca Vasile
- Children: 3
- Education: University of Bucharest; Bucharest Academy of Economic Studies
- Profession: Economist, historian, academic, poet

Radu Vasile (Note: Romanian pronunciation: [ˈradu vaˈsile]) (10 October 1942 – 3 July 2013) was a Romanian politician, historian, academic, writer and poet who served as Prime Minister of Romania from 17 April 1998 to 13 December 1999. A leading member of the Christian Democratic National Peasants' Party (PNȚ-CD), he played a prominent role within the Romanian Democratic Convention (CDR). Before becoming active in national politics, Vasile pursued an academic career at the Bucharest Academy of Economic Studies (ASE), where he specialized in economic history and the history of economic thought. He served in the Senate of Romania, from 1992 to 2004, originally as a PNȚ-CD member, and then, from 2000 to 2004, on behalf of the Democratic Party (PD). His premiership was mainly marked by his handling of the January 1999 Mineriad, during which miners marched toward Bucharest in protest against planned mine closures and government restructuring measures, an event that some commentators and media outlets described as an attempted coup d'état. In addition to his political career, Vasile published poetry under the pen name Radu Mischiu.

== Early life and education ==
Radu Vasile was born on 10 October 1942, in Sibiu, and was raised in the Roman Catholic faith, growing up in Drăgășani. His father was a lawyer and a political prisoner, who died in 1986. Vasile studied history at the University of Bucharest, graduating from the Faculty of History in 1967.

== Academic career ==
After studying history, he shifted his academic focus toward economics and economic history. From 1967 to 1969, he was a historian at the National Village Museum in Bucharest, and then, from 1969 to 1972, a researcher at the Nicolae Iorga Institute of History. In 1972, he joined the Bucharest Academy of Economic Studies as a teaching assistant. He earned a doctorate in economics in 1977 and subsequently became a lecturer at the Academy of Economic Studies (ASE). After participating in the Romanian Revolution of 1989, he served as Vice-Dean of the Faculty of Commerce at the Academy of Economic Studies, a position he held from 1990, until 1992. In 1993, he was appointed professor at the institution. Radu Vasile presented over 25 academic papers at scholarly conferences and other academic events in Romania and internationally. He also gave lectures on historical subjects at the École doctorale of Sorbonne University.

== Early political career (1990-1998) ==
Vasile joined the Christian Democratic National Peasants' Party (PNȚ-CD) in January 1990, soon becoming head of Economics Department and spokesman (appointed directly by Corneliu Coposu), positions which he held until he was elected senator for Bacău County in 1992. Vasile served as vice-president of the Parliamentary Inquiry Committee on Investigating the Financial Blockage in Agriculture and vice-president of the Senate from 1 September 1994 to 1998. He was secretary-general of the PNȚ-CD from 1996 to 1998.

In 1994, Vasile was a founding member of the Central European Forum, alongside Bronisław Geremek, Raymond Barre and Helmut Schmidt. He was also the director of Dreptatea, the PNȚ-CD affiliated newspaper.

In January 1996, Vasile was elected secretary-general of the Christian Democratic National Peasants' Party, winning against Gavril Dejeu 210 to 80; 4 ballots were annulled. Vasile held the position until he became prime-minister, in April 1998. In June 1996, Vasile stated that he would be willing to become Prime Minister of Romania if he were supported by a majority of the parties forming the Romanian Democratic Convention (CDR). Vasile declared that, should he become prime minister, his first three measures would be the publication of a "white book" on the Văcăroiu government's record, a reduction in taxes, particularly payroll taxes, and the appointment of CDR experts to lead the Ministries of Interior and Finance, as well as the National Bank of Romania.

Vasile was reelected as a senator for Bucharest in 1996, being reelected vice-president of the Senate on 28 November. He also became head of the Delegation of Romania to the Parliamentary Assembly of the Council of Europe and, in 1997, vice-president of the Parliamentary Assembly of the Council of Europe.

== Prime Minister of Romania (1998-1999) ==
Following the victory of Emil Constantinescu and the Romanian Democratic Convention (CDR) in the 1996 election, most of the PNȚ-CD (the biggest party within CDR) favored Vasile for the position of prime minister, while the president favored Bucharest Mayor Victor Ciorbea, who was then designated to lead the government. Vasile refused Ciorbea's offer to become a minister. Due to pressure and conflicts with the ministers from the Democratic Party (PD), Victor Ciorbea resigned on 30 March 1998.

Following the resignation of Victor Ciorbea, Vasile was appointed Prime Minister of Romania by President Emil Constantinescu on 17 April 1998, even though Vasile was not the president's preferred choice. As prime minister, Vasile led a coalition government in which ministerial portfolios were controlled by the constituent parties. According to councilor George Scarlat, there were tensions between Vasile and some coalition partners, as well as within PNȚ-CD itself, limiting his ability to directly influence cabinet appointments and dismissals.

=== Domestic policy ===
==== Economy ====
During Vasile's tenure as prime minister, the government focused on avoiding a sovereign default amid significant external debt obligations inherited from previous governments. To secure budgetary resources and meet debt repayments, the government accelerated the privatization process and continued structural adjustment programs agreed with international financial institutions.

Major privatizations completed during this period included the sale of a 35% stake in Romtelecom to the Greek telecommunications company OTE, the privatization of Banca Română de Dezvoltare (BRD) through its acquisition by Société Générale, and the privatization of Automobile Dacia, which was acquired by Renault in 1999. The government also pursued privatization and restructuring measures in industry and agriculture under the Private Sector Adjustment Loan (PSAL) and Agricultural Sector Adjustment Loan (ASAL) programs supported by the World Bank. The reforms were praised by supporters as necessary for macroeconomic stabilization, while critics argued they imposed significant social costs.

The Vasile government introduced several fiscal measures intended to stimulate economic activity and exports. These included the elimination of profit tax on export revenues, a reduction in the value-added tax (VAT) rate from 22% to 19%, and a reduction in the corporate profit tax rate from 38% to 25%.

According to supporters of the government's policies, these measures contributed to macroeconomic stabilization and helped lay the foundations for the economic recovery that began in 2000, after several years of economic contraction. Critics, however, have debated the extent to which the subsequent economic growth can be attributed to reforms implemented during Vasile's premiership.

==== Administrative Reforms ====
The Vasile government implemented a series of administrative reforms and decentralization measures. Among the most significant were the adoption of the Local Public Finance Law and the Local Public Administration Law, which expanded the powers of local authorities and strengthened their financial autonomy. These reforms enabled local administrations to manage greater financial resources and exercise broader responsibilities in areas such as urban development, public investment, and community services.

During the same period, legislation on the civil service was adopted, establishing the legal framework for Romania's professional civil service and contributing to the modernization and professionalization of public administration.

The Vasile government also undertook a reorganization of the central government. In 1999, the number of cabinet members was reduced to 17, including the prime minister. The number of state secretaries and other senior positions within the central administration was also reduced as part of an effort to streamline government structures and improve administrative efficiency.

=== Foreign policy ===
==== Israel ====
At Vasile's request, Israel became the destination of his first official foreign visit. There, he met Prime Minister Benjamin Netanyahu and discussed a strategic partnership focused particularly on agriculture, health and education, with the possibility of a "Israel-Turkey-Romania triangle" in the strategic field. Later, Vasile expressed regret over the plan never materializing, considering that a Romania-Israel partnership on agriculture would have been notably beneficial.

==== Pope John Paul II's visit ====
In 1997, Pope John Paul II wanted to strengthen ties with Romania and expressed his desire to visit the country. The disagreements between the Romanian Orthodox Church and the Romanian Greek Catholic Church determined Patriarch Teoctist of Romania to delay the pope's invitation, while the pope refused to visit without permission from the Romanian Orthodox Church. In 1998, Radu Vasile, a Roman Catholic, visited Rome and met with Pope John Paul II, whom he invited to visit Romania, on behalf of President Emil Constantinescu. Patriarch Teoctist soon invited the pope too. Pope John Paul II then visited the country in May 1999, the first visit of the pope to a majority Orthodox country since the Great Schism in 1054.

==== Russia ====
In November 1999, Vasile made an official visit to Moscow, where he met Russian prime minister Vladimir Putin. The discussions focused on bilateral relations and economic cooperation between Romania and the Russian Federation. The visit took place in the context of Romania's efforts to balance relations with Russia while pursuing integration into Euro-Atlantic institutions.

=== January and February 1999 Mineriads ===
Radu Vasile's term as Prime Minister was marked by the January and February 1999 Mineriads. The previous governments, concerned about social unrest, never restructured the Jiu Valley mining sector, which operated at a significant financial loss and depended heavily on government support. On 16 December 1998, the government announced the closing of the mines at Dâlja and Bărbăteni, as part of the new restructuring program. On 18 December, Miron Cozma, the leader of the League of Miners Unions of the Jiu Valley took the decision to launch a general strike, demanding that the closures be cancelled, as well as raising wages. The miners asked for the negotiations to take place in the Jiu Valley.

Radu Vasile and Minister of Industries Radu Berceanu refused to come to Petroșani, so the miners threatened to come to Bucharest, as they had previously done in 1990 and 1991. Minister of Transport Traian Băsescu also refused to provide transport by train for the miners. After failed negotiations between the miners and the Committee for Budget-Finance of the Senate, led by Viorel Cataramă, the Gendarmerie blocked Jiului Defile to prevent the miners from reaching Bucharest. On 14 January, the miners asked for different terms, accepting the restructuring, but asking for 10,000 dollars or 500 dollars pension for each fired miner.

On 18 January, under the leadership of Miron Cozma and Romeo Beja, the miners began marching toward Bucharest. The Gendarmerie kept retreating, aiming to avoid a violent clash. On 20 January, the miners reached Horezu. The government decided to close all railways on Oltului Valley and more Gendarmerie were deployed on the Bucharest-Pitești Motorway. The miners sent scouts ahead, who informed them of the large Gendarmerie presence at Costești. The over 15,000 miners overwhelmed the Gendarmerie, even capturing a few hundred of them, in addition to Nicolae Curcăneanu, the Prefect of Vâlcea County. In the night of 21 to 22 January, a state of emergency was declared in the entire country.

To stop the conflict, Radu Vasile met with Miron Cozma at the nearby Cozia Monastery on 22 and 23 January. The meeting was arranged by the bishop of Covasna and Harghita, Ioan Selejan, whom both men personally knew. According to accounts published by individuals close to the events, Vasile became concerned by what he perceived as the reluctance of security and law-enforcement institutions to confront the miners. These accounts state that he travelled to the Cozia area accompanied only by a small group of aides and associates and, despite being advised of the risks, decided to meet Miron Cozma personally. After the negotiations, an agreement was signed, now known as the Peace of Cozia. The government agreed not to close the mines at Dâlja and Bărbăteni, and the miners' leaders would not face legal action.

On 16 February, 2,000 miners left again for Bucharest, after the Supreme Court of Romania ruled that miners' leader Miron Cozma would serve an 18-year prison sentence for the September 1991 Mineriad, which led to the fall of the Roman Government. The miners were stopped in a violent clash with the Gendarmerie at Stoenești, Olt.

=== Dismissal ===
On 13 December 1999, two days after the European Union invited Romania to start accession negotiations, the Christian Democratic National Peasants' Party, then led by Ion Diaconescu announced that they would withdraw political support for Vasile, amid tensions between the prime minister and President Emil Constantinescu. As Vasile refused to leave, 12 of 17 total ministers resigned. The prime minister still refused to resign, citing "moral reasons". President Emil Constantinescu took advantage of several articles from the constitution, that allowed him to dismiss the head of government if he proves to be incapable of doing his job. Constantinescu argued that Vasile became incapable executing his duties when the coalition's parties withdrew support from him, so Vasile was dismissed by the president. Alexandru Athanasiu became acting prime minister until Mugur Isărescu took the position. On 27 December, Vasile was removed from the PNȚ-CD.

In a later retrospective assessment, Vasile attributed the circumstances surrounding his departure from office to a combination of factors. He argued that tensions between Romania's president and prime minister had been a recurring feature of post-1989 Romanian politics (such as with Ion Iliescu and Petre Roman, Ion Iliescu and Adrian Năstase or Traian Băsescu and Călin Popescu-Tăriceanu) and stated that his relationship with President Emil Constantinescu had been marked by personal differences in views and style, though not by fundamental disagreements over principles or the political system. He also pointed to internal divisions within the Christian Democratic National Peasants' Party, which had supported his premiership, and suggested that some party members were concerned about the approaching 2000 elections. Vasile denied speculation that he intended to take control of the party or run for the presidency.

== Later life ==
Two months after his expulsion from the Christian Democratic National Peasants' Party, he joined and led the minor People's Party of Romania, before joining the Democratic Party (PD) in October 2000, at the invitation of PD President Traian Băsescu. Vasile later became a member of the party's National Permanent Bureau. He was elected Senator for Argeș during the 2000 elections. On 2 February 2004, he was elected vice-president of the Senate, replacing Ion Vela.

Vasile stated that he travelled to Israel approximately 13 or 14 times for treatment of his colon cancer. In 2010, he suffered a surgical procedure.

== Personal life ==
Vasile was married and had three children.

Vasile wrote two novels: Fabricius and Buricul președintelui, as well as a memoir called Cursă pe contrasens. He also published a poetry collection called Echilibru în toate, published under the pseudonym Radu Mischiu. Vasile cited Virgil Mazilescu, Mircea Dinescu and Nichita Stănescu as inspirations.

Radu Vasile was a monarchist.

In 2013, Radu Vasile considered Pope John Paul II's visit and the Peace of Cozia to be his two biggest achievements as prime minister.

== Death ==
Radu Vasile died of colon cancer on 3 July 2013, at around 4:00 AM, being 70 years old. The announcement was made by Vasile's former political opponent and neighbor, Corneliu Vadim Tudor. The funeral took place two days later, in the Catholic section of Bellu Cemetery, next to Corneliu Coposu. President Traian Băsescu decorated Radu Vasile post-mortem with the Order of the Star of Romania.

== Published works ==
- Fabricius [Fabricius] (in Romanian). Polirom. 1999. ISBN 973-683-265-1.
- Cursă pe contrasens [Race in the Wrong Lane] (in Romanian). Humanitas. 2002. ISBN 973-50-0291-4.
- Buricul președintelui [The Navel of the President] (in Romanian). Galaxia Gutenberg. 2009. ISBN 978-973-141-154-5.
- Echilibru în toate [Balance in Everything] (in Romanian). Cartea Românească. 1999. ISBN 973-23-0734-X.

== Notes ==
Political offices
Preceded by Gavril Dejeu; Acting	Prime Minister of Romania; 1998–1999	Succeeded by Alexandru Athanasiu; Acting
