= Cozia Monastery =

Romanian medieval monastic complex

- Mănăstirea Cozia
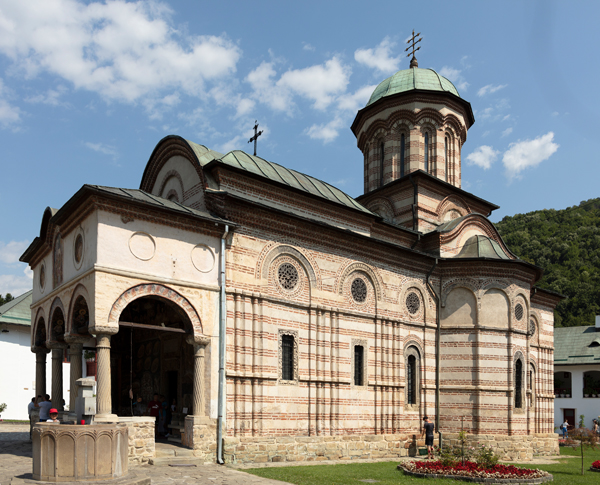
- Holy Trinity Church of the Cozia Monastery

Religion
- Affiliation: Eastern Orthodox
- Ecclesiastical or organisational status: Monastery
- Leadership: Archbishop Varsanufie of Râmnic and Argeș
- Patron: Holy Trinity
- Year consecrated: 1388
- Status: Active

Location
- Location: Călimănești, Vâlcea County, Romania
- Interactive map of Cozia Monastery
- Coordinates: 45.27159°N 24.31549°E

Architecture
- Founder: Mircea the Elder
- Groundbreaking: 1387
- Completed: 1391

Cozia Monastery (Romanian: Mănăstirea Cozia) is one of the most important medieval monastic complexes in Romania, located on the right bank of the Olt River near the town of Călimănești in Vâlcea County. Founded in the late 14th century by voivode Mircea the Elder, the monastery has played a pivotal role in the spiritual, cultural, and political history of the region for over six centuries. Its construction between 1387 and 1391 marked a defining moment in the development of Wallachian religious architecture and established Cozia as a prominent Orthodox monastic center.

Dedicated to the Holy Trinity, Cozia Monastery is notable not only as a religious institution but also as a royal necropolis, housing the tomb of its founder, Mircea the Elder, who is remembered for his military resistance against the Ottoman Empire and his contributions to the consolidation of Wallachia. The monastery’s architecture is a blend of Byzantine, Serbian Morava, and local Romanian influences, and it served as a model for subsequent ecclesiastical constructions in the region.

The monastery remains an active monastic community and a key pilgrimage site. Its frescoes, icons, and inscriptions constitute an invaluable part of Romania’s artistic and religious heritage. Cozia has also held a symbolic place in Romanian national identity, appearing in poetry, philately, and historiography, and continues to attract scholars and visitors alike.

== History ==
=== Founding and early years ===
Cozia Monastery, located on the right bank of the Olt River near Călimănești in Vâlcea County, Romania, was founded by voivode Mircea the Elder, who ruled Wallachia from 1386 to 1418. Construction of the monastery began in 1387 and was completed in 1391, with its consecration taking place in 1388. The monastery was initially known as "Nucetul," meaning "walnut grove" in Romanian, a name reflecting the area's abundance of walnut trees. The current name, "Cozia," is derived from the nearby Cozia Mountain and has Cuman origins, with "koz" meaning "walnut" in Turkic languages.

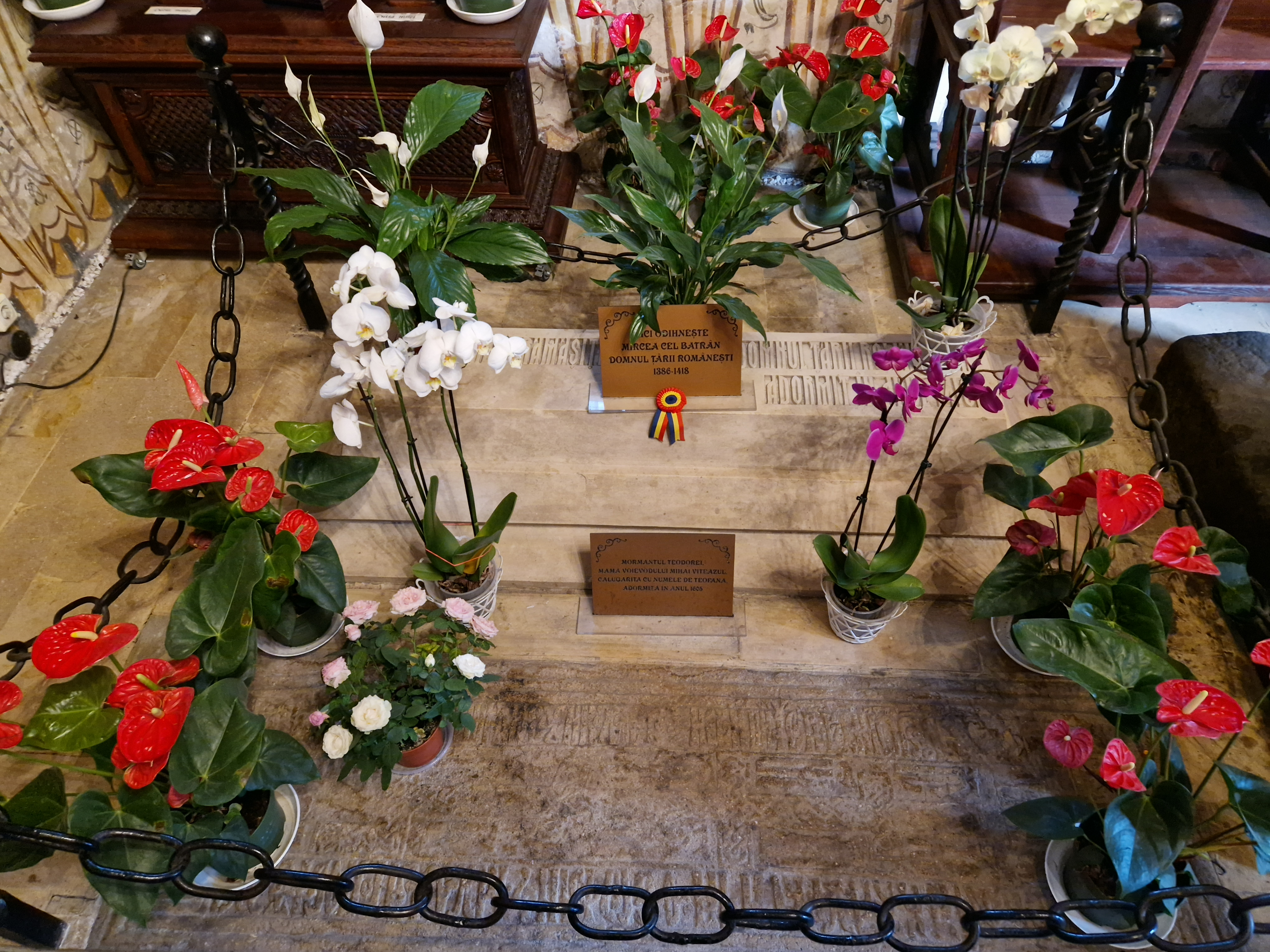
Tombstone of Mircea the Elder

Mircea the Elder established Cozia Monastery as a significant religious and cultural center, as well as a strategic fortification. During his reign, Wallachia reached its greatest territorial extent, and the monastery's location along the Olt River served both spiritual and defensive purposes. Beyond its religious function, Cozia Monastery played a pivotal role in Wallachian society. It served as a royal necropolis, with Mircea the Elder's tomb located within the main church. The monastery also functioned as a center for manuscript production and preservation, contributing to the dissemination of religious and cultural texts. Historical records indicate that the monastery owned a significant number of Gypsy slaves, including many identified as Rudari, a relationship that began in the 14th century and continued as long as slavery was legal in Wallachia.

=== Subsequent modifications ===
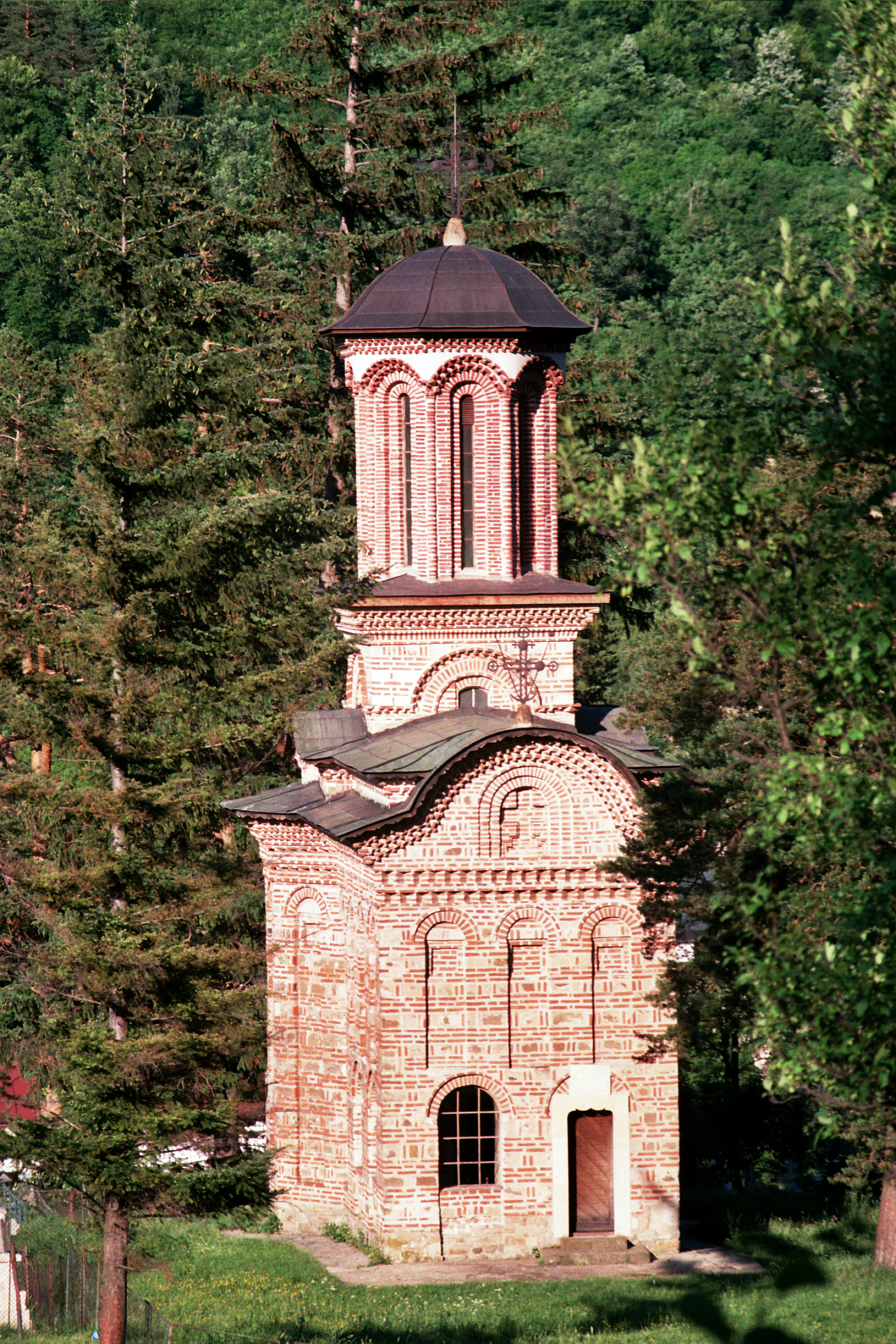
"Bolnița" of Cozia Monastery

In 1543, during the reign of voivode Radu Paisie, the "bolnița" or infirmary church was constructed within the monastery complex. This smaller church is notable for its well-preserved interior frescoes, including a votive portrait of Mircea the Elder and his sons. The frescoes, attributed to masters David and Radoslav, are considered among the last Wallachian monuments attributable to high Byzantine art, featuring highlights of great preciousness. The stonemasonry, credited to a master named Maxim, likely has origins in Serbian art, reflecting Radu Paisie's family connections with the Branković dynasty. The murals also depict the voivode and his son Marcu, alongside Cozia's administrator, Stroe, whose portrait is regarded as one of the first realistic works in Romanian art.

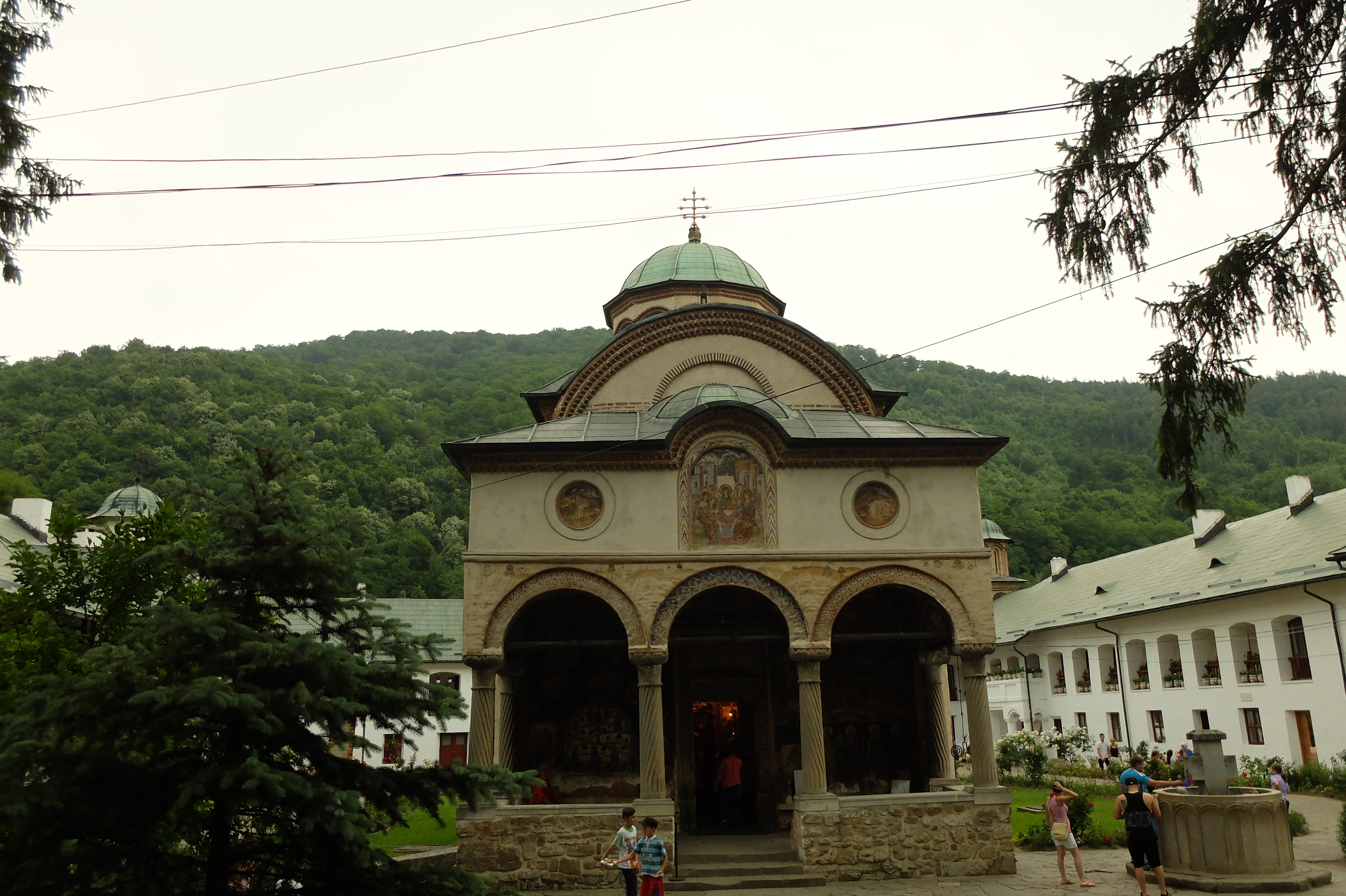
Veranda added by Constantin Brâncoveanu in 1707

In 1707, prince Constantin Brâncoveanu, undertook an extensive renovation of the Cozia complex. Brâncoveanu, known for promoting the distinctive Brâncovenesc style, added a large open veranda to the main church, an elegant stone fountain in the courtyard, a small chapel, and a guard tower.

Between 1850 and 1856, extensive repairs and restorations were carried out under princes Gheorghe Bibescu and Barbu Știrbei, princes who sought to preserve and modernize the country's historic religious sites.

Beginning in 1958, a multi-decade government restoration program was launched, lasting until 1980. This work involved consolidating the monastic cells, reinforcing the towers, and replacing the aging roof with a copper covering. In 1966, Nicolae Ceaușescu, then General Secretary of the Romanian Communist Party, visited Cozia Monastery. He documented his impressions in the monastery's Golden Book, emphasizing its importance as a symbol of national heritage and the resting place of Mircea the Elder.

During the January 1999 Mineriad, Prime Minister Radu Vasile negotiated an agreement with Miron Cozma at Cozia Monastery, resulting in the "Peace of Cozia".

== Architecture ==
The central structure of Cozia Monastery is the Church of the Holy Trinity, consecrated in 1388. This triconch (three-lobed) church is a prime example of medieval Wallachian architecture, exhibiting a synthesis of Byzantine and local styles. Constructed using alternating layers of stone and brick, the church features attenuated vertical proportions and is adorned with stone rosettes and decorative frames. The façade's design reflects influences from the Morava school of Serbian architecture, suggesting the involvement of Serbian artisans in its construction.

Located within the monastery complex is the Bolnița Church, built in 1543. Originally serving as a hospital chapel, this smaller triconch church houses well-preserved interior frescoes, including a votive portrait of Mircea the Elder and his sons. The Bolnița Church exemplifies the continuation of Byzantine artistic traditions in Wallachia during the 16th century.

The monastery was rebuilt and enlarged multiple times. Notable features include two domed chapels at the corners of the eastern fortification walls overlooking the Olt River. These chapels, along with the Bolnița Church, showcase neo-Byzantine and Brâncovenesc styles—a blend of local, Byzantine, Renaissance, and Baroque elements. Under the patronage of Constantin Brâncoveanu, a veranda, a new fountain, a chapel, and a watchtower were added, incorporating elements of the Brâncovenesc style into the monastery's architecture.

== Artwork and iconography ==
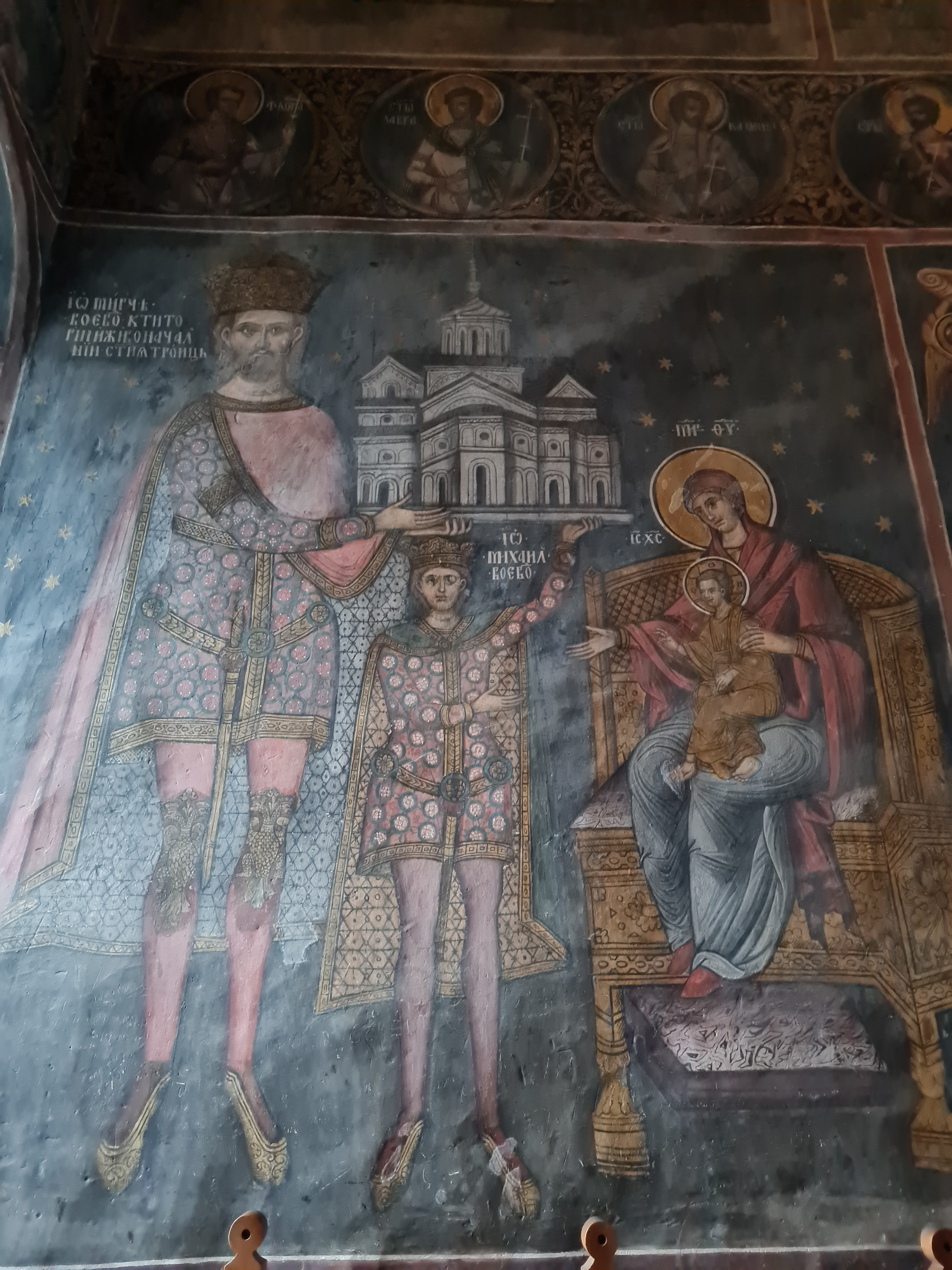
Fresco of Mircea the Elder and his son, Mihail, holding a model of the church

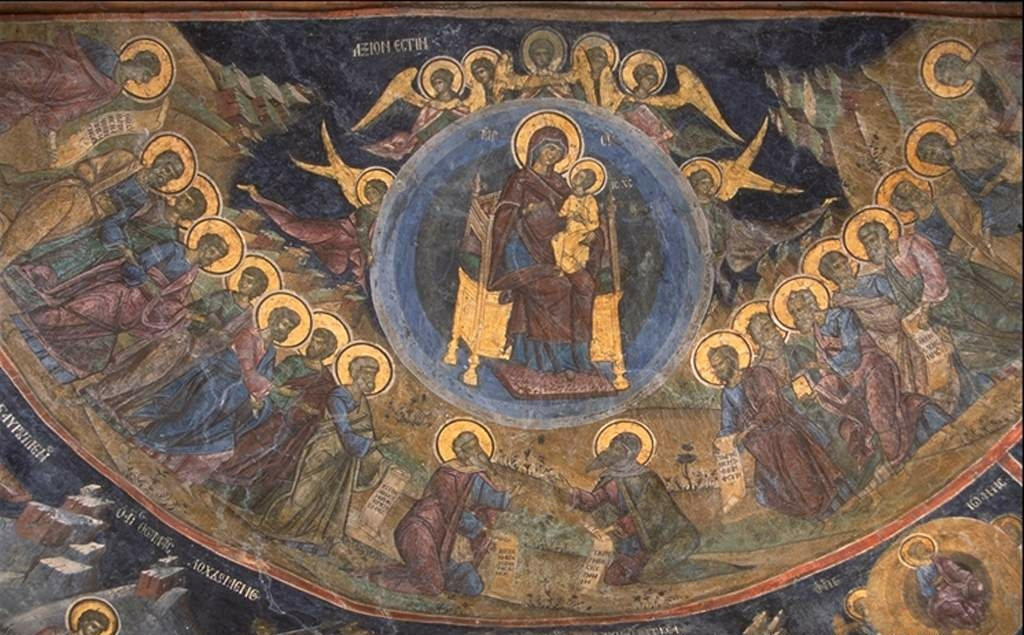
Mural painting from the Cozia Monastery

Cozia Monastery is renowned for its exceptional collection of medieval frescoes and icons, which are integral to Romania's national cultural heritage. The monastery's main church, the Church of the Holy Trinity, features original frescoes dating back to 1390–1391. These frescoes exemplify the Byzantine artistic tradition, characterized by vivid colors and intricate theological symbolism. Notably, the church includes a votive portrait of Mircea the Elder, the monastery's founder, depicted holding a model of the church alongside his son, Mihail. This portrait is situated on the wall to the right of the narthex and is also present in the northern chapel and the monastery's hospice.

Cozia's iconographic program includes depictions of Ecumenical Councils and scenes emphasizing Orthodox doctrine, serving both religious and political purposes. These artworks underscore the monastery's role in promoting the legitimacy of Mircea the Elder's reign and the defense of Orthodox Christianity in a turbulent historical context.

== In popular culture ==
Several poems have been written about Cozia Monastery, such as Cozia (by Dimitrie Bolintineanu), Cozia (by Ion Pillat) and Umbra lui Mircea - La Cozia (Shadow of Mircea - At Cozia, by Grigore Alexandrescu).

In 1968, the monastery was depicted on a Romanian postage stamp.

== Burials ==
- Mircea I of Wallachia
- Carol Hohenzollern
- Teodora Cantacuzino
