= February 1999 Mineriad =

Protests in Romania

- Part of the Mineriads
- Date: 16–17 February 1999

Casualties
- Death: 1 death (confirmed); 15 deaths (unofficial figure)
- Arrested: Over 500

The February 1999 Mineriad was the last of the six mineriads that occurred in Romania. It began on 16 February 1999, when 2,000–2,500 miners from the Jiu Valley left for Bucharest in around 50 buses as a protest against the 18-year long jail sentence given in absentia to Miron Cozma, the "leader" of the miners, for his actions in the September 1991 Mineriad against the Romanian Government.

On the morning of the next day, the miners were stopped in Stoenești, Olt County, by Romanian Gendarmerie units, who began to beat the miners "until the paving stones were reddened with their blood", according to witnesses. Reportedly, some natives from the village were misidentified as miners and beaten as well and some other natives assisted the miners in the fight against the Gendarmerie. Cozma tried to escape on a bus, but he was surrounded and arrested on 17 February at around 9:00 EET along with over 500 miners. After this, he was taken to a prison in Rahova, Bucharest.

Some 15 miners reportedly lost their lives due to the mineriad, but this has not been confirmed by official sources. The case of Constantin Harag is well known; he was a miner who died at the age of 49 during the event and who was buried in the village. After the mineriad, Cozma was sentenced to another 7 additional years in prison.

Some time later, on 20 February 2011, Cozma (who was liberated from prison on 2 December 2007) returned to Stoenești to commemorate those who died during the mineriad and asked the Romanian authorities to investigate the culprits of the deaths, who were still unknown.
