= Rahova =

Neighborhood in Bucharest, Romania

Coordinates: 44°23′55″N 26°03′18″E

Rahova on the map of Bucharest

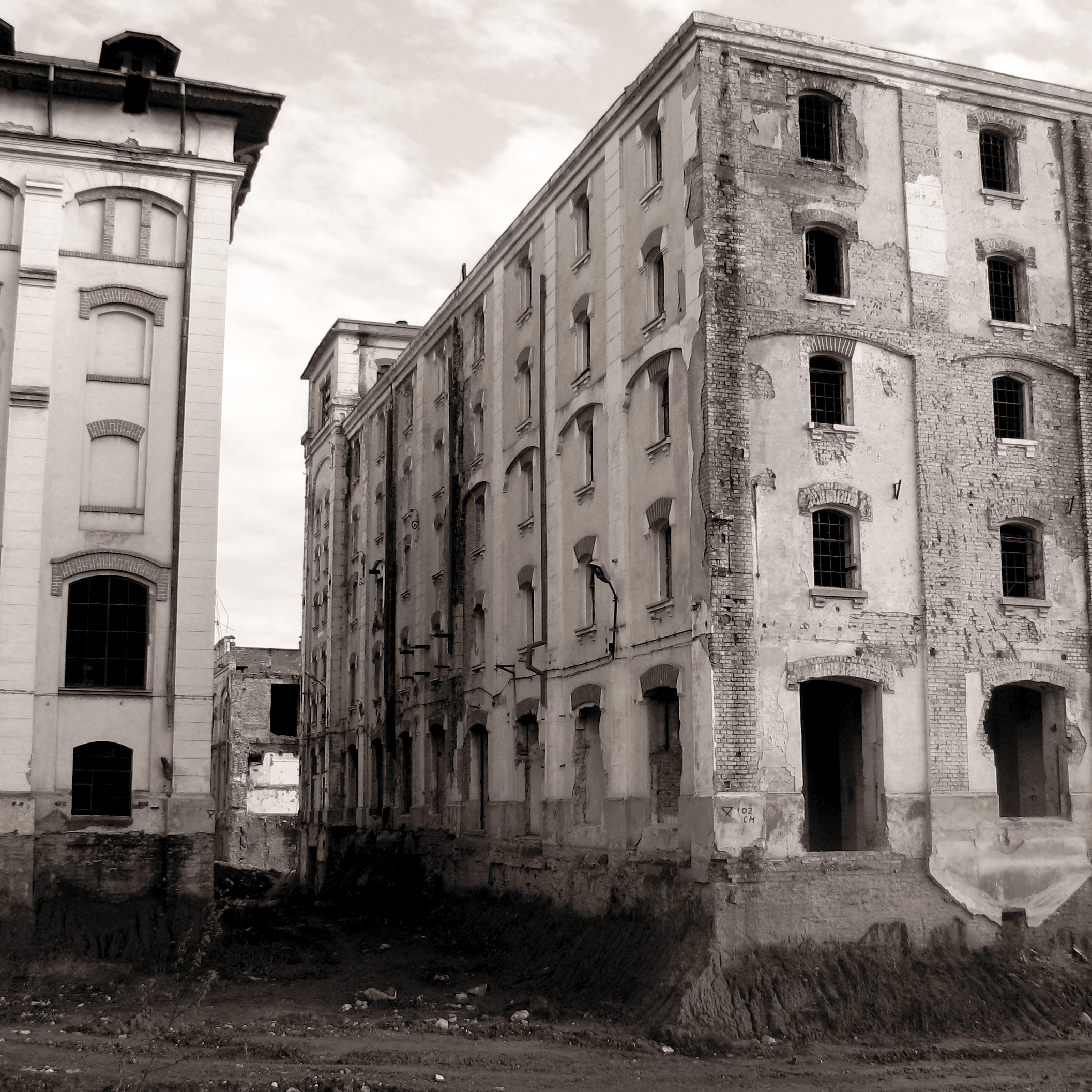
Rahova Beer Factory

Rahova is a neighbourhood of southwest Bucharest, Romania, situated in Sector 5, west of Dâmbovița River. It is named after the Bulgarian town Rahovo (today Oryahovo), site of a battle in the Romanian War of Independence.

The neighborhood stretches from between Antiaeriană and Drumul Sării Avenues to Panduri Square (in the west), Panduri and 13 Septembrie Streets in the north, George Cosbuc Avenue, Viilor and Sălaj Streets in the east and Bucharest City Limits in the South. Roughly, the neighbourhood is organized alongside two important arterial streets (13 Septembrie and Rahovei Streets, and the streets linking them). It neighbors Drumul Taberei, Centrul Civic (at Izvor), and Ferentari. Roughly, Rahova is situated on the Uranus and Viilor hills.

The inhabitants of the neighbourhood split it further in "zones", partially based on the naming and numbering of the block of flats (a specificity of Rahova is that house numbering and postal addressing is not done based on actual street numbers but rather on block numbers - a letter of the zone and an index number). As such, there are seven zones (east to west and north to south): Drumul Sării (DS), Petre Ispirescu (P), Mārgeanului (M), Panduri, 13 Septembrie/Sebastian (S), Rahova (R) and Alexandriei (A).

According to the Local Tax Direction of The 5th District, the population of this area is around 180,000.

== History ==
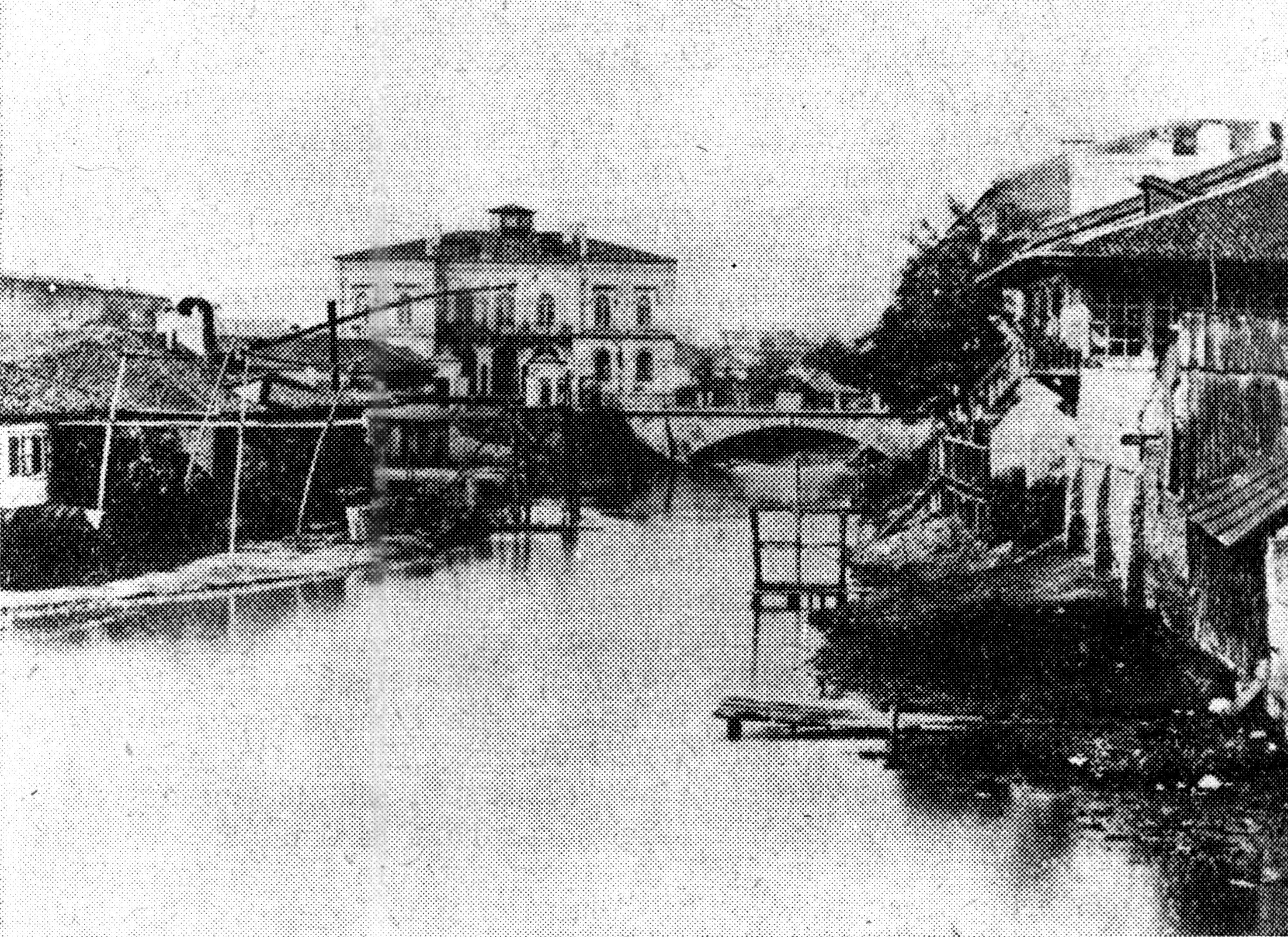
Calicilor Bridge in 1856

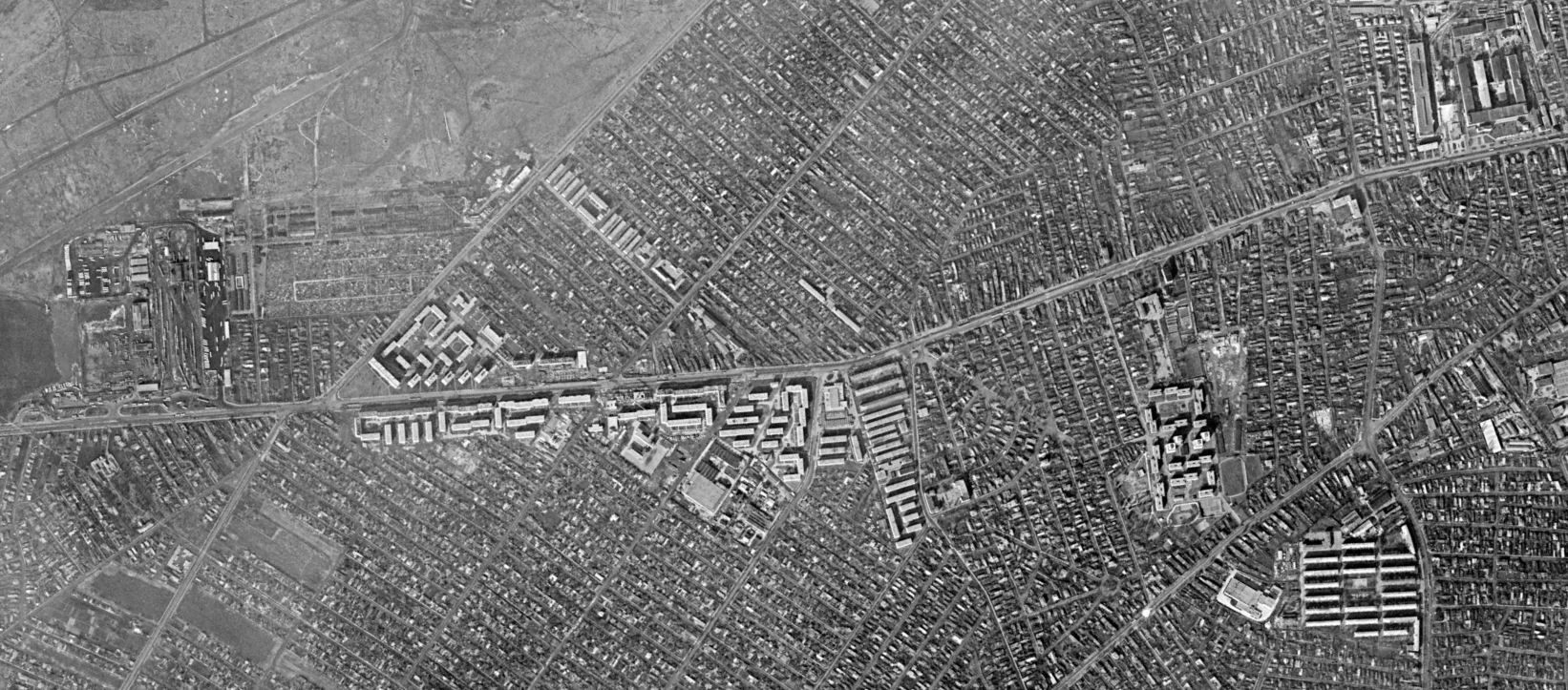
The Rahova neighborhood in 1976, prior to most of it being demolished. The white buildings are the early apartment blocks

One of the main roads crossing the neighborhood, and bearing today its name (Calea Rahovei, Rahova Road) was previously known as Podul Calicilor (Bridge of the Poor), with the first document mentioning it dating from 1639. The term "bridge" came from the material used to pave it: long wooden bridge beams, which were cheaper than stone pavement. Living near this road were beggars and poor people, gathered together like those from La Cour des Miracles in Paris. Later, the authorities scattered them away, and the road was renamed Calea Craiovei to remove the association with poverty. The modern name dates from the end of the Independence War.

Since the 1950s, Rahova entered a period of long urban decay, because it was, until the 1960s, the furthest district from the city centre, had a lack of infrastructure and contained the Rahova Penitentiary, the largest jail in Bucharest. In the early 1970s the area was also the headquarters of the infamous Barbugiu clan, the first organized crime gang to be recognized by the authorities. Calea Rahovei was also known as The Florists' Way (Drumul Florăreselor), because it was (and to some extent still is) the location of Bucharest's flower markets and flower gardens. Beginning with 1979, much of the old neighborhood was demolished to allow for construction of apartment blocks (the oldest in the area are 3-4 storey apartment buildings, from the early 1960s, and more recent ones from the mid 1970s).

Starting in 1997, various efforts were made to renew the area. Rahova is currently undergoing modernization. Rahova is now linked to city center by a light metro line, upgraded from the existing tram line, with trains running as frequently as every minute. New façades have been built for the apartment buildings along Calea Rahovei (renovation using thermical insulation techniques), as well as significant improvements in the neighborhood high school (including a new swimming pool) and a complete overhaul of the parks, the Flower Market (Piața de Flori) and Rahova Market. This was done with the support of both the Bucharest City Hall and Sector 5 Mayor (where Rahova is located) and has resulted in the gentrification of the district.

In the morning hours of 17 October 2025, a gas explosion from a faulty heater occurred in Block 32 next to the Dimitrie Bolintineanu Highschool, leading to the deaths of 3 people and injuries to another 14 people.

== Transportation ==
Rahova is serviced by a number of public transport (STB) lines, especially tramways (or light rail) and to a lesser extent buses. Line 32 is the main line, with tramways running every minute from Rahovei Market to Unirii Square. Currently a number of tramway lines are upgraded and/or converted to Light Rail. There are no plans to build or extend the network to the area. Because of a chaotic layout of roads and streets, and the presence of a belt of factories to the north of the neighbourhood (The Old Industrial Area of Trafic Greu, officially Progresului Road), there are basically only three roads heading downtown (Calea Rahovei, 13 Septembrie and Drumul Sării - with no secondary streets whatsoever), all with only two lanes per way of traffic and heavy public transport. This causes severe traffic jams that can last for up to five hours daily. The only solution found was to demolish two factories and make way for a new road, but the proposal was deemed too expensive and scrapped.

== Administration ==
As part of the 5th Sector, it is directly administered by the Mayor and Council of the Sector, which has responsibility over local affairs such as schools and cleaning services, and by the General Mayor and General Council of Bucharest, which is responsible for main roads and other citywide affairs. Offices of the Sector 5 mayoralty exist in The Flower Market and in Rahova Market. The area is taxed at all taxation levels - A level (the highest) for the 13 Septembrie Avenue and Drumul Sării, B level for the Rahova Avenue, Mărgeanului and Alexandriei Road, C level for the low density residential district and D level for a small, completely undeveloped area belonging to the Rahova Penitentiary, at the outskirts of the city.
