= Stoenești, Olt =

Stoenești
- Commune
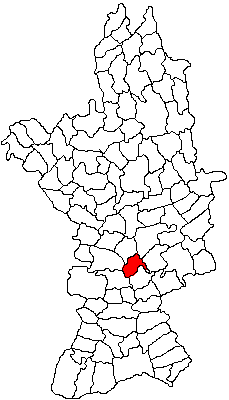
- Location in Olt County

- Location in Romania
- Coordinates: 44°07′N 24°30′E
- Country: Romania
- County: Olt
- Area: 35.31 km^{2} (13.63 sq mi)
- Population (2021-12-01): 2,172
  - Density: 61.51/km^{2} (159.3/sq mi)
- Time zone: UTC+02:00 (EET)
  - Summer (DST): UTC+03:00 (EEST)
- Vehicle reg.: OT

Stoenești is a commune in Olt County, Oltenia, Romania. It is composed of a single village, Stoenești.

The February 1999 Mineriad ended in this village. Unofficial figures indicated that 15 miners died during clashes with law enforcement.
