= Third Roman cabinet =

Roman III
- 109th Cabinet of Romania

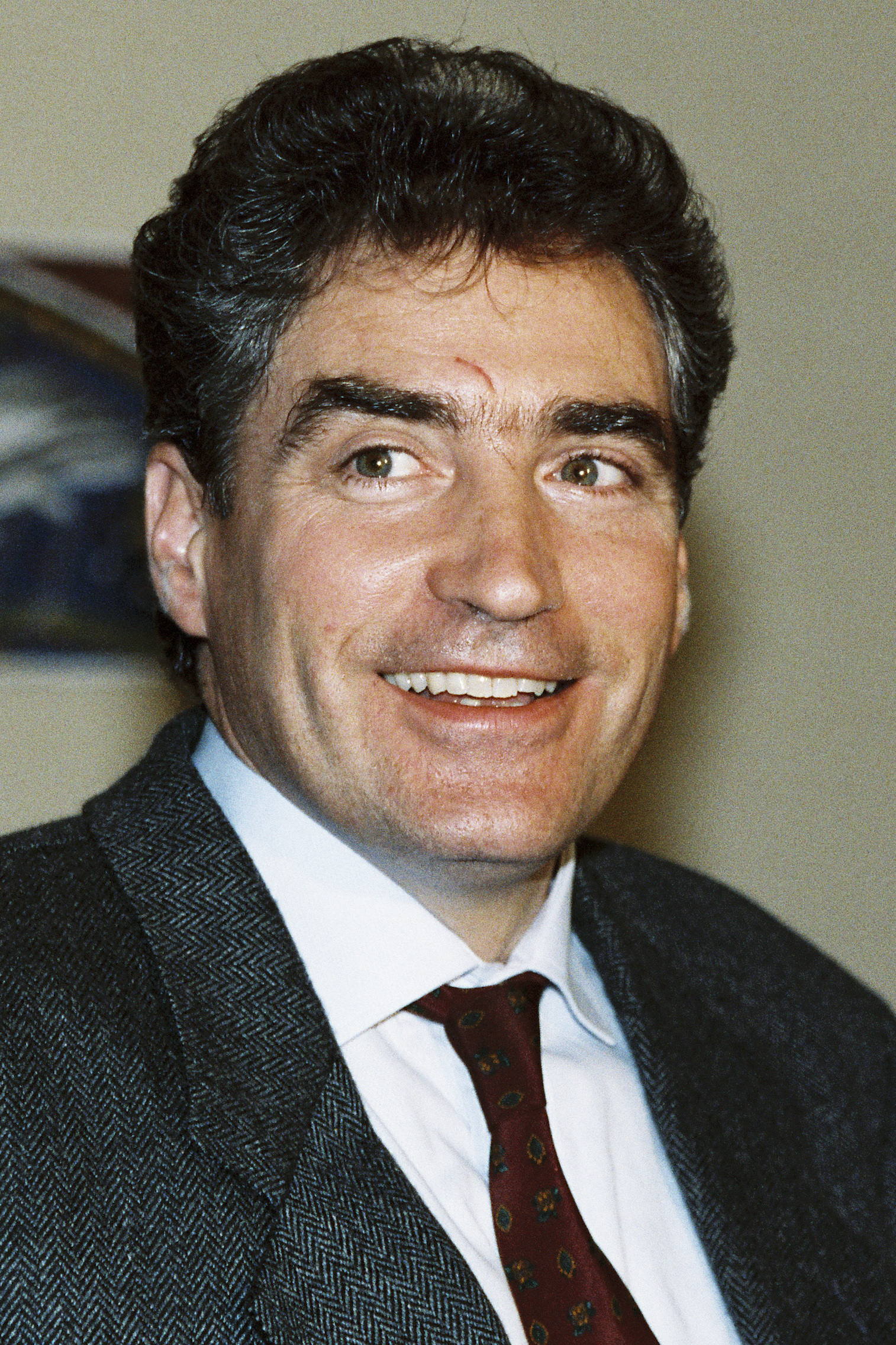
- Date formed: 30 April 1991
- Date dissolved: 16 October 1991

People and organisations
- Head of state: Ion Iliescu
- Head of government: Petre Roman
- Member party: FSN
- Status in legislature: Majority

History
- Election: -
- Outgoing election: -
- Legislature term: 1990–1992
- Predecessor: Roman II
- Successor: Stolojan

The third cabinet of prime minister of Romania Petre Roman took office from 30 April 1991 up until 16 October 1991. It was the 109th overall cabinet of Romania and ended three weeks after the September 1991 Mineriad which occurred in Bucharest. It was a single-party majority cabinet, plus independents.

== Members ==
Single-party majority cabinet: FSN and Independent ministers

Prime Minister:

- Petre Roman/Theodor Stolojan(ad interim)

Minister of State:

- Dan Mircea Popescu (Co-ordinating Quality of Life)

Ministers:

- Victor Babiuc (Justice)
- Niculae Spiroiu (Defense)
- Andrei Pleșu (Culture and Arts)
- Ioan Țipu (Agriculture)
- Adrian Năstase (Foreign Affairs)
- Eugen Dijmărescu (Economy)
- Doru-Viorel Ursu (Interior)
- Gheorghe Ștefan (Education)
- Valeriu Eugen Pop (Environment)
- Mihnea Marmeliuc (Labor)
- Traian Băsescu (Transport)
- Bogdan Marinescu (Health)
- Andrei Chirică (Communication)
- Victor Athanasie Stănculescu (Industry)
- Constantin Fota (Commerce and Tourism)
- Bogdan Niculescu-Duvăz (Youth and Sport)
