= Second Roman cabinet =

Roman II
- 108th Cabinet of Romania

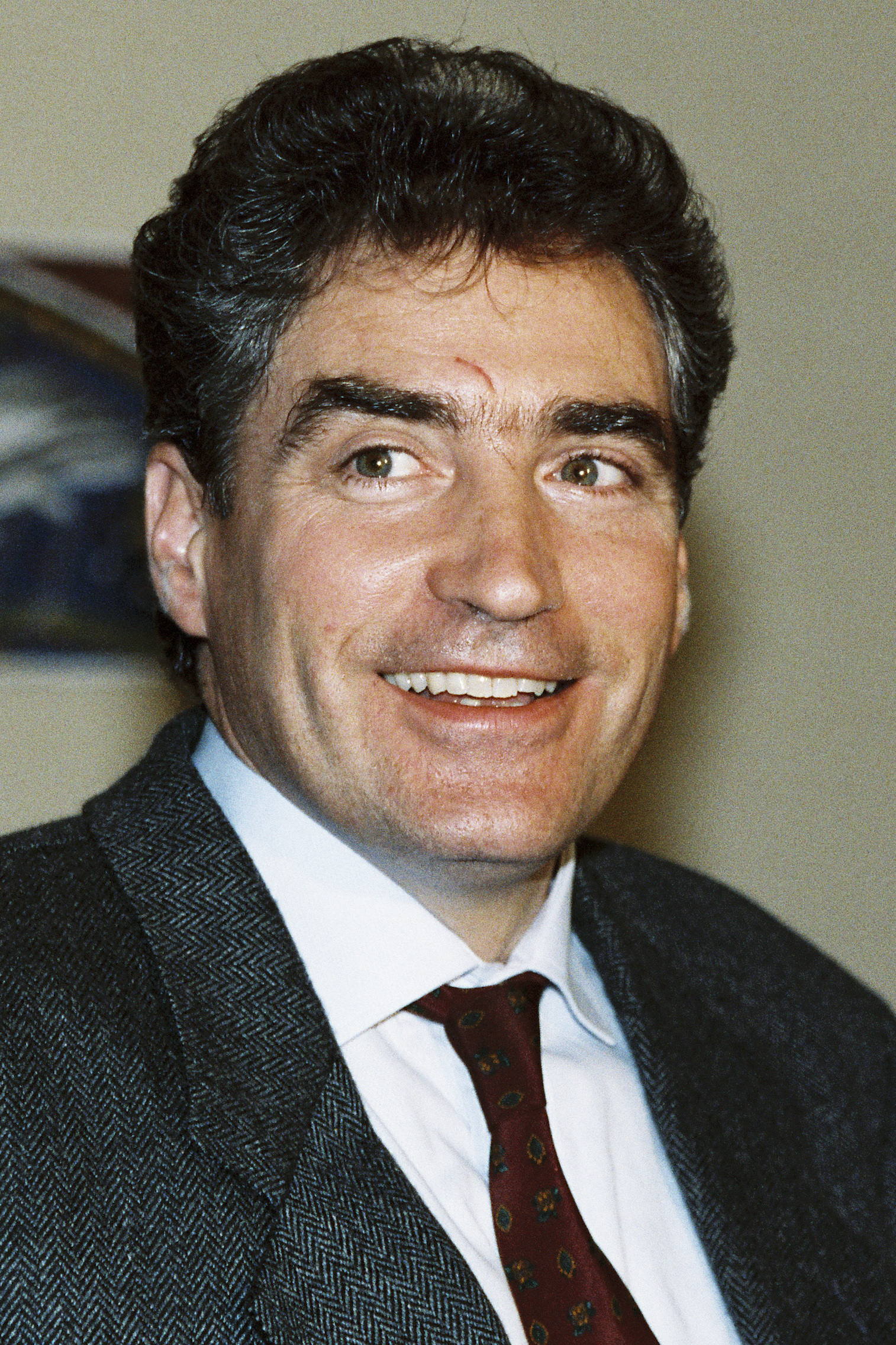
- Date formed: 28 June 1990
- Date dissolved: 30 April 1991

People and organisations
- Head of state: Ion Iliescu
- Head of government: Petre Roman
- Member party: FSN
- Status in legislature: Majority

History
- Election: 20 May 1990
- Legislature term: 1990–1992
- Predecessor: Roman I
- Successor: Roman III

The Second Roman cabinet was the government of Romania from 28 June 1990 through 30 April 1991, led by Prime Minister Petre Roman. It was a single-party majority cabinet; it was formed only by the party that won the elections with 66% of the vote, the National Salvation Front (Frontul Salvării Naționale, FSN). The cabinet included a few independents.

== Members ==
Position	Minister	Party	Date sworn in	Left office
Prime Minister (Romanian: Prim-ministru)	Petre Roman	FSN	28 June 1990	16 October 1991
Minister without portofolio (Romanian: Ministru fără portofoliu)	Ioan Aurel Stoica	FSN	30 april 1991	16 October 1991
Minister of Finance / Economy and Finance (Romanian: Ministrul Finanțelor / Economiei și Finanțelor)	Theodor Stolojan	Independent	28 June 1990	30 April 1991
Minister of Finance / Economy and Finance (Romanian: Ministrul Finanțelor / Economiei și Finanțelor)	Eugen Dijmărescu	FSN	30 april 1991	16 October 1991
Minister of National Defence (Romanian: Ministrul Apărării Naționale)	Victor Stănculescu	FSN	28 June 1990	30 April 1991
Minister of National Defence (Romanian: Ministrul Apărării Naționale)	Niculae Spiroiu	Independent	30 april 1991	16 October 1991
Minister of External Affairs (Romanian: Ministrul Afacerilor Externe)	Adrian Năstase	FSN	28 June 1990	16 October 1991
Minister of the Interior (Romanian: Ministrul de Interne)	Doru Viorel Ursu	Independent	28 June 1990	16 October 1991
Minister of Agriculture and Food (Romanian: Ministrul Agriculturii și Alimentației)	Ioan Țipu	FSN	28 June 1990	16 October 1991
Minister of Environment (Romanian: Ministrul Mediului)	Valeriu Eugen Pop	Independent	28 June 1990	16 October 1991
Minister of Culture (Romanian: Ministrul Culturii)	Andrei Pleșu	Independent	28 June 1990	16 October 1991
Minister of Education and Science (Romanian: Ministrul Învățământului și Științei)	Gheorghe Ștefan	Independent		16 October 1991
Minister of Youth and Sport (Romanian: Ministrul Tineretului și Sportului)	Bogdan Niculescu-Duvăz	FSN	28 June 1990 30 April 1990	16 October 1991
Minister of Trade and Tourism (Romanian: Ministrul Comerțului și Turismului)	Constantin Fota	Independent	28 June 1990	16 October 1991
Minister of Public Works, Transport and Territorial Planning (Romanian: Ministrul Lucrărilor Publice, Transporturilor și Amenajării Teritoriului)	Doru Pană	FSN	28 June 1990	30 April 1991
Minister of Public Works and Territorial Planning (Romanian: Ministrul Lucrărilor Publice și Amenajării Teritoriului)	Doru Pană	FSN	30 April 1991	16 October 1991
Minister of Transport (Romanian: Ministrul Transporturilor)	Traian Băsescu	FSN	30 April 1991	16 October 1991
Minister of Communications (Romanian: Ministrul Comunicațiilor)	Andrei Chirică	FSN	28 June 1990	16 October 1991
Minister of Justice (Romanian: Ministrul Justiției)	Victor Babiuc	FSN	28 June 1990	16 October 1991
Minister of Labor and Social Protection / Labor and Social Security (Romanian: Ministrul Muncii și Protecției Sociale / Muncii și Asigurărilor Sociale)	Cătălin Zamfir	FSN	28 June 1990	30 April 1991
Minister of Labor and Social Protection / Labor and Social Security (Romanian: Ministrul Muncii și Protecției Sociale / Muncii și Asigurărilor Sociale)	Mihnea Marmeliuc	FSN	30 April 1991	16 October 1991
Minister of Health (Romanian: Ministrul Sănătății)	Bogdan Marinescu	Independent	28 June 1990	16 October 1991
Minister of Resources and Industry / Industry (Romanian: Ministrul Resurselor și Industriei / Industriei)	Mihai Zisu	Independent	28 June 1990	30 April 1991
Minister of Resources and Industry / Industry (Romanian: Ministrul Resurselor și Industriei / Industriei)	Victor Stănculescu	FSN	30 April 1991	16 October 1991
