= First Roman cabinet =

Romanian government cabinet

Roman I
- 107th Cabinet of Romania

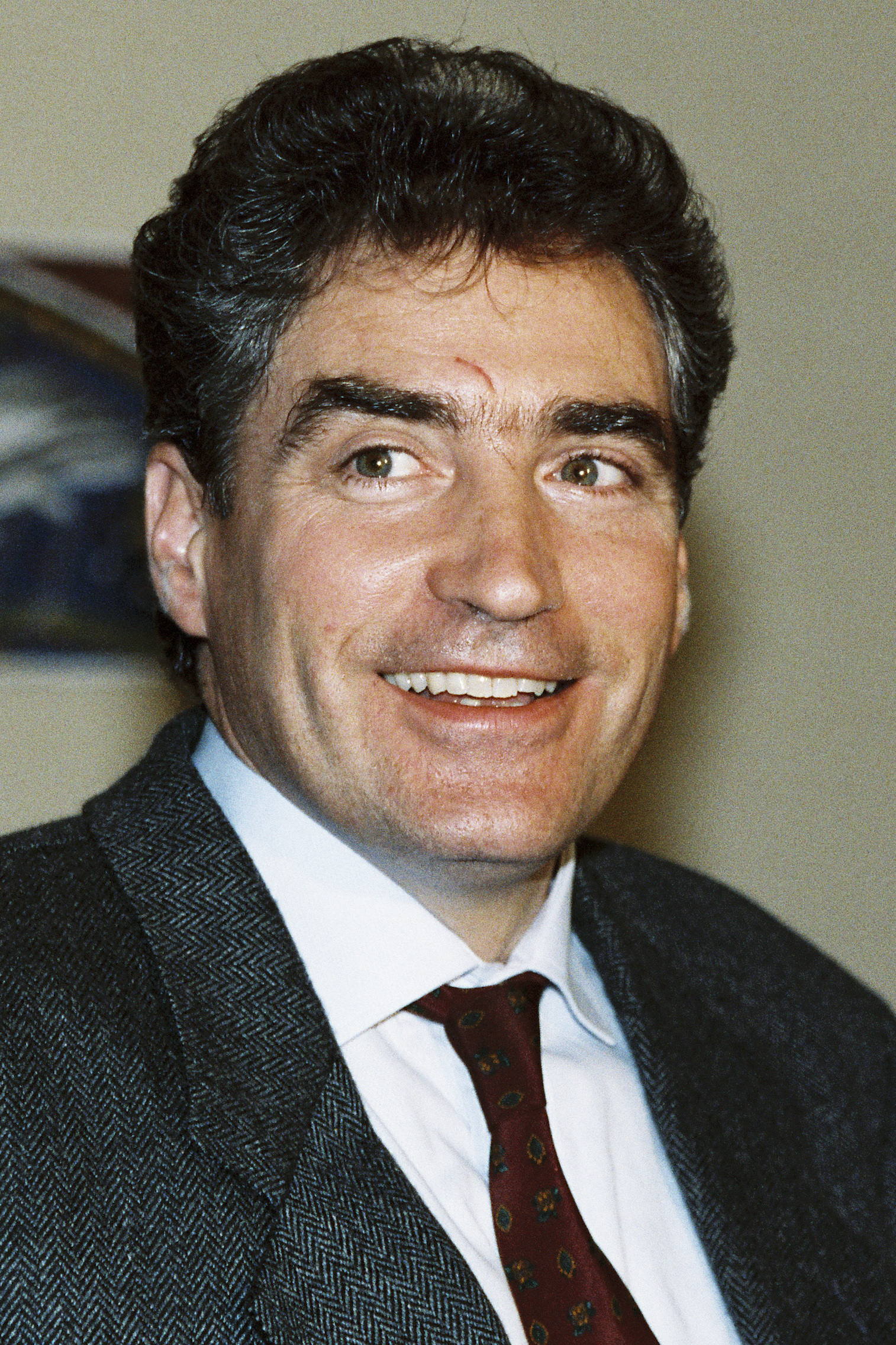
- Date formed: 26 December 1989
- Date dissolved: 28 June 1990

People and organisations
- Head of state: Ion Iliescu
- Head of government: Petre Roman
- Total no. of members: 43
- Member party: FSN (Note: FSN only became a political party on 6 February 1990)
- Status in legislature: Majority (Provisional)
- Opposition party: UDMR; PNL; PNȚCD
- Opposition leader: Géza Domokos Radu Câmpeanu Corneliu Coposu

History
- Incoming formation: Romanian Revolution
- Election: -
- Outgoing election: 20 May 1990
- Legislature term: CFSN (Dec 1989–Feb 1990) CPUN (Feb–Jun 1990)
- Predecessor: Dăscălescu II
- Successor: Roman II

The First Roman cabinet was the government of Romania between 26 December 1989 and 28 June 1990, led by Prime Minister Petre Roman. It was formed in the wake of the Romanian Revolution by the National Salvation Front, a provisional governing body that seized power during the Revolution and later reconstituted itself as a political party on 6 February 1990. It was the first post-Communist Romanian government, though most of its ministers were former members of the Romanian Communist Party. The cabinet was established to govern on a provisional basis until the country's first free elections in 1990, after which it was replaced by the Second Roman cabinet.

== Members ==
Position	Minister	Party (Note: The National Salvation Front (FSN) was initially established as a political organization following the Romanian Revolution of December 1989. It formally became a political party in February 1990.)	Date sworn in	Left office
Prime Minister (Romanian: Prim-ministru)	Petre Roman	FSN	26 December 1989	28 June 1990
Deputy Prime Minister (Romanian: Viceprim-ministru)	Mihai Drăgănescu	FSN	28 December 1989	31 May 1990
Deputy Prime Minister (Romanian: Viceprim-ministru)	Gelu Voican Voiculescu	FSN	28 December 1989	28 June 1990
Deputy Prime Minister (Romanian: Viceprim-ministru)	Ioan Aurel Stoica	FSN	28 March 1990	28 June 1990
Deputy Prime Minister (Romanian: Viceprim-ministru)	Anton Vătășescu	FSN	28 March 1990	28 June 1990
Minister of Finance (Romanian: Ministrul Finanțelor)	Ion Pățan	FSN	26 December 1989	28 June 1990
Minister of National Defence (Romanian: Ministrul Apărării Naționale)	Nicolae Militaru	FSN	26 December 1989	16 February 1990
Minister of National Defence (Romanian: Ministrul Apărării Naționale)	Victor Stănculescu	FSN	16 February 1990	28 June 1990
Minister of External Affairs (Romanian: Ministrul Afacerilor Externe)	Sergiu Celac	FSN	28 December 1989	28 June 1990
Minister of the Interior (Romanian: Ministrul de Interne)	Mihai Chițac	FSN	28 December 1989	14 June 1990
Minister of the Interior (Romanian: Ministrul de Interne)	Doru Viorel Ursu	FSN	14 June 1990	28 June 1990
Minister of National Economy (Romanian: Ministrul Economiei Naționale)	Victor Stănculescu	FSN	28 December 1989	16 February 1990
Minister of National Economy (Romanian: Ministrul Economiei Naționale)	vacant		16 February 1990	28 June 1990
Minister of Agriculture and Food Industry (Romanian: Ministrul Agriculturii și Industriei Alimentare)	Ștefan Nicolae	FSN	28 December 1989	28 June 1990
Minister of Water, Forests and Surrounding Environment (Romanian: Ministrul Apelor, Pădurilor și Mediului Înconjurător)	Simion Hâncu	FSN	28 December 1989	28 June 1990
Minister of Culture (Romanian: Ministrul Culturii)	Andrei Pleșu	Independent	28 December 1989	28 June 1990
Minister of the Chemical and Petrochemical Industry (Romanian: Ministrul Industriei Chimice și Petrochimice)	Gheorghe Caranfil	FSN	28 December 1989	28 June 1990
Minister of Electric Energy (Romanian: Ministrul Energiei Electrice)	Adrian Georgescu	FSN	28 December 1989	28 June 1990
Minister of the Electrotechnical, Electronics, and Informatics Industry (Romanian: Ministrul Industriei Electrotehnicii, Electronicii și Informaticii)	Anton Vătășescu	FSN	29 December 1989	28 March 1990
Minister of the Electrotechnical, Electronics, and Informatics Industry (Romanian: Ministrul Industriei Electrotehnicii, Electronicii și Informaticii)	vacant		28 March 1990	28 June 1990
Minister of the Metallurgical Industry (Romanian: Ministrul Industriei Metalurgice)	Ioan Cheșa	FSN	29 December 1989	28 June 1990
Minister of Petroleum (Romanian: Ministrul Petrolului)	Victor Murea	FSN	29 December 1989	28 June 1990
Minister of Light Industry (Romanian: Ministrul Industriei Ușoare)	Constantin Popescu	FSN	29 December 1989	28 June 1990
Minister of Education (Romanian: Ministrul Învățământului)	Mihai Șora	Independent	30 December 1989	28 June 1990
Minister of Sport (Romanian: Ministrul Sportului)	Mircea Angelescu	FSN	30 December 1989	28 June 1990
Minister of the Machine Building Industry (Romanian: Ministrul Industriei Construcțiilor de Mașini)	Ioan Aurel Stoica	FSN	30 December 1989	28 March 1990
Minister of the Machine Building Industry (Romanian: Ministrul Industriei Construcțiilor de Mașini)	vacant		28 March 1990	28 June 1990
Minister of Foreign Trade (Romanian: Ministrul Comerțului Exterior)	Nicolae M. Nicolae	FSN	2 January 1990	28 June 1990
Minister of Transport (Romanian: Ministrul Transporturilor)	Corneliu Burada	FSN	2 January 1990	28 June 1990
Minister of Posts and Telecommunications (Romanian: Ministrul Poștelor și Telecomunicațiilor)	Stelian Pintelie	FSN	2 January 1990	28 June 1990
Minister of Geology (Romanian: Ministrul Geologiei)	Ioan Folea	FSN	2 January 1990	28 June 1990
Minister of Mines (Romanian: Ministrul Minelor)	Nicolae Dicu	FSN	2 January 1990	28 June 1990
Minister of Tourism (Romanian: Ministrul Turismului)	Mihai Lupoi	FSN	2 January 1990 14 January 1990	7 february 1990
Minister of Tourism (Romanian: Ministrul Turismului)	vacant		7 february 1990	28 June 1990
Minister of Justice (Romanian: Ministrul Justiției)	Teofil Pop	FSN	3 January 1990	28 June 1990
Minister of Labor and Social Welfare (Romanian: Ministrul Muncii și Ocrotirilor Sociale)	Mihnea Marmeliuc	FSN	5 January 1990	28 June 1990
Minister of Health (Romanian: Ministrul Sănătății)	Dan Enăchescu	FSN	8 January 1990	28 June 1990
Minister of the Wood Industry (Romanian: Ministrul Industriei Lemnului)	Ion Râmbu	FSN	14 January 1990	28 June 1990
Minister of Religious Affairs (Romanian: Ministrul Cultelor)	Nicolae Stoicescu	Independent	18 January 1990	28 June 1990
Minister of Constructions (Romanian: Ministrul Construcțiilor)	Alexandru Dimitriu	FSN	18 January 1990	28 June 1990

=== Ministers of State ===
- Petru Pepelea
- Mihail Victor Buracu
- Costică Bădescu
- Ovidiu Adrian Moțiu

Preceded by Second Dăscălescu cabinet	Cabinet of Romania; 26 December 1989 - 28 June 1990	Succeeded by Second Roman cabinet
