= Marțian Dan =

Romanian politician (1935–2002)

Member of the National Salvation Front Council
- In office 22 December 1989 – 26 December 1989

President of the Chamber of Deputies
- In office 19 June 1990 – 16 October 1992
- President: Ion Iliescu
- Preceded by: Nicolae Giosan (as President of the Great National Assembly)
- Succeeded by: Adrian Năstase

Member of the Chamber of Deputies
- In office 18 June 1990 – 10 December 2000
- Constituency: Vaslui County

Minister of Youth and First Secretary of the Union of Communist Youth
- In office 17 March 1971 – 23 October 1972
- Prime Minister: Ion Gheorghe Maurer
- Preceded by: Ion Iliescu
- Succeeded by: Ion Traian Ștefănescu

Personal details
- Born: 23 November 1935 Remetea, Bihor, Kingdom of Romania
- Died: 8 March 2002 (aged 66) Lisbon, Portugal
- Party: Romanian Communist Party (before 1989); National Salvation Front (1989-1992); Democratic National Salvation Front (1992-1993); Party of Social Democracy in Romania (1993-2001)
- Children: 2
- Occupation: Politician
- Known for: Romanian Revolution

Marțian Dan (23 November 1935 – 8 March 2002) was a Romanian politician and university professor.

Dan was a member of the Romanian Communist Party during the period of the Socialist Republic of Romania. In 1971, he became a leader in the Union of Communist Youth, a position that allowed him to serve as Minister in the union from 1971 to 1972. In 1974, he briefly distanced himself from the world of politics due to grievances with the Ceaușescu regime.

Dan was a leader in the Romanian Revolution, and was a member of the Council of the National Salvation Front, in which he served as secretary of the executive office. He joined the National Salvation Front as a political party in 1990 under the leadership of Ion Iliescu.

== Early political career ==
Marțian Dan was Jewish. In the 1950s, as Dan attended high school in Oradea, he joined the Union of Communist Youth, a youth organization of the Romanian Communist Party (PCR), which had held power in the country since the fall of fascist dictator, Ion Antonescu. From 1954 to 1955 he was a student of the Faculty of General Economics of the Academy of Economic Studies in Bucharest, and from 1955 to 1960 he relocated to the Soviet Union, to take courses at the Faculty of History of the Lomonosov State University of Moscow. In this phase, he succeeded in getting himself elected as a member of the Union of Communist Youth committee of the faculty and secretary of the organization's Romanian students in Moscow.

After graduating in 1960, Dan began a teaching career at the University of Bucharest in the Department of History and Philosophy, where he taught until 1989.

In the 1960s he continued political militancy within Bucharest, climbing the leadership of the youth organization of the party, which allowed him, in March 1971, to succeed Ion Iliescu as first secretary of the Central Committee of the Union of Communist Youth and, for that reason, as Minister for Youth Affairs in the Government of Ion Gheorghe Maurer. He left the position in October 1972.

In addition to activism in the Union of Communist Youth, Dan also had connections within the Communist Party of Romania itself. In 1968, under the regime of Nicolae Ceaușescu, he was appointed as secretary and was responsible for propaganda within the City Committee of Bucharest, while on 12 August 1969 he succeeded in being appointed as an alternate member of the Central Committee of the Communist Party of Romania. In November 1974 he withdrew from political life, apparently because of a difference of views with the then-president of the socialist republic, Nicolae Ceaușescu, concerning management of the country. He concentrated, therefore, almost exclusively on his teaching career.

== During the Romanian Revolution ==
With outbreak of the Romanian Revolution, during the power vacuum and the subsequent violence, Marțian Dan, alongside other communist dissidents such as Ion Iliescu, Petre Roman, Dumitru Mazilu, Silviu Brucan, Corneliu Mănescu, Victor Stănculescu and Alexandru Bârlădeanu, promoted the creation of a provisional legislative body, and formed the Council of the National Salvation Front (CFSN) which took power in late December 1989 and oversaw the execution of Nicolae Ceaușescu and his wife. After the execution, on 27 December Dan was designated by the group led by Iliescu as Secretary of the CFSN Executive Office. The executive group of the council was composed of former major PCR members, that had never denied their adherence to communist ideals, but that had lost faith in Ceaușescu as a leader.

In February 1990 Iliescu founded the party of National Salvation Front (FSN), which was formed by an overwhelming majority of CFSN members. At the same time, this was renamed the Interim Council of the National Union (CPUN) and it also allowed the participation of other party representatives that had been created after the Revolution's conclusion. The platform, however, followed the organisation of the CFSN, the majority were members of the FSN and its management was confirmed with very few variations. Marțian was secretary of the executive office also in the new entity, which was in charge of holding free elections and enacting the first laws in any democratic sense.

Infighting, especially between Mazilu and Iliescu, plagued the Nation Salvation Front, and made many of its members wary of the new provisional government's ability to arrive at decisions. Mazilu wanted capitalism, Roman wanted socialism, and Iliescu wanted to keep communism in place, but merely remove Ceaușescu. As a member of the Communist Party, who greatly revered figures such as Ștefan Foriș, whose death had been ordered by Ceaușescu's predecessor, Gheorghe Gheorghiu-Dej, Dan tended toward sympathy for Iliescu, making his loyalties known for when Mazilu was pushed out of the party by Iliescu and other senior party members.

== Member of Parliament ==
In the first democratic elections in May 1990, the FSN held a plebiscite that allowed it to control 2/3 of the parliament. Marțian Dan observed the election as deputy in the Vaslui district and, in June 1990, was appointed president of the Chamber of Deputies, holding office for the entire constituent legislature until October 1992. He was also a member of the committee drafting the draft Rules of the Chamber and co-chairman of the Constituent Assembly (July 1990-November 1991).

By this time, the FSN had left behind any notion that Communism should be kept in place. Instead, Dan and Iliescu tended toward social democracy, whereas Petre Roman remained loyal to socialism as an ideology.

In the spring of 1992 the FSN experienced a split as a result of the clash between the two conflicting tendencies within the party. The FSN itself, led by the president of the republic Ion Iliescu, was a promoter of a line of slow transition to the market economy through social democracy, and former Prime Minister Petre Roman desired to keep the democratic socialism that had remained a strong ideological attraction throughout the revolution. In response to this conflict, Iliescu founded the Democratic National Salvation Front (FDSN), while the counterpart party led by Roman maintained the original initials. Iliescu, with Dan in his cabinet, attended the parliamentary and presidential elections of 1992 under the new party name.

Dan remained loyal to Iliescu's new party, which successfully established itself as the largest political party in the national elections of 1992. The following year, the party changed its name to the Social Democratic Party of Romania (PDSR). Dan, considered one of the leaders of the revolution by much of the Romanian population, became party leader in the House, as well as national vice president of the PDSR serving under Adrian Năstase, a colleague from Dan's party.

Following a 1996 defeat to the centre-right Romanian Democratic Convention (CDR), the PDSR moved to the opposition. Dan was reelected for another 4-year term in office, holding varying positions during this time.

== Final years ==
At the end of his parliamentary term in June 2001, Dan became the Romanian ambassador to Portugal, a position he retained until his death on 8 March 2002.

On 12 March 2002, Dan was adorned with the Order of the Star of Romania by President Ion Iliescu due to his status as one of the leaders who brought democracy to Romania.

== Personal life ==
Dan was married and he had two children.

== Awards and honours ==
Romania : Order of the Star of Romania (Romania)
