= Democratic Force =

Democratic Force can refer to:

- Democratic Force (Costa Rica)
- Democratic Force (France)
- Democratic Force (Peru)
- Democratic Force (Romania)
