= Ilie Verdeț =

Romanian communist politician (1925–2001)

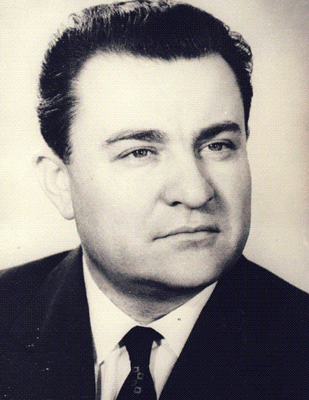

51st Prime Minister of Romania
- In office 29 March 1979 – 21 May 1982
- President: Nicolae Ceaușescu
- Preceded by: Manea Mănescu
- Succeeded by: Constantin Dăscălescu
- Claimed; 22 December 1989 – 22 December 1989 (about 20 minutes)
- Preceded by: Constantin Dăscălescu
- Succeeded by: Petre Roman

Vice President of the State Council
- In office 1982–1982
- President: Nicolae Ceaușescu
- Succeeded by: Manea Manescu

First Vice President of the Council of Ministers
- In office 3 January 1967 – 30 March 1979
- Prime Minister: Ion Gheorghe Maurer; Manea Manescu
- Preceded by: Emil Bodnăraș
- Succeeded by: Gheorghe Oprea

Chairman of the State Planning Committee
- In office 7 March 1978 – 29 March 1979
- Prime Minister: Manea Manescu
- Preceded by: Mihai Marinescu
- Succeeded by: Nicolae Constantin

Minister of Mines
- In office 18 October 1985 – 20 June 1986
- Prime Minister: Constantin Dăscălescu
- Preceded by: Marin Ștefanache
- Succeeded by: Ministry dissolved

Chairman of the Socialist Party of Labour
- In office 16 November 1990 – 20 March 2001
- Succeeded by: Ion Sasu

Personal details
- Born: 10 May 1925 Comănești, Kingdom of Romania
- Died: 20 March 2001 (aged 75) Bucharest, Romania
- Party: Romanian Communist Party (1945–1989); Socialist Party of Labour (1990–2001)
- Spouse: Reghina Graumann (1947–2001)
- Education: Bucharest Academy of Economic Studies

Ilie Verdeț (Note: Romanian pronunciation: [iˈli.e verˈdet͡s]) (10 May 1925 – 20 March 2001) was a Romanian communist politician who served as Romania's Prime Minister from 1979 to 1982.

== Biography ==
Born in Comănești, Bacău County, and a miner from age 12, he joined the Romanian Communist Party (PCR) in 1945. After graduating from the Bucharest Academy of Economic Studies, he climbed through the party apparatus. By the early 1960s, he was working in the central office of the PCR in Bucharest, as deputy of Nicolae Ceauşescu, who was in charge of party organization and appointments. After the death of Gheorghe Gheorghiu-Dej in March 1965, Verdeț helped Ceaușescu gain the position of Secretary General of the PCR.

Soon afterwards, Verdeț was promoted to the Permanent Bureau of the Political Executive Committee of the PCR. He held many political positions, including those of Deputy Prime Minister (1966–1974) and Prime Minister of Romania (1979–1982). He was sent by Ceaușescu to solve the Jiu Valley miners' strike of 1977, but was unable to negotiate and was held hostage for two days (which he had later denied).

After the fall of Ceaușescu in December 1989, Verdeț declared himself the head of a provisional government, but it only lasted for about 20 minutes, after which he was pushed aside by Ion Iliescu, who emerged as the leader of the National Salvation Front (FSN).

Subsequently, in 1990, Verdeț founded a political party called Socialist Party of Labour (Romanian: Partidul Socialist al Muncii, PSM), which narrowly entered Parliament in the 1992 elections, but in the next elections failed to win any seats. He remained the leader of PSM until the 2000 elections, after which he was removed from this position.

He died of a heart attack in 2001 in Bucharest at the age of 75.

== Private life ==
Verdeț and his wife Reghina married in 1947. They had two daughters: Doina (b. 1948) and Cezarina (b. 1953).

Political offices
| Preceded by Manea Mănescu | Prime Minister of Romania; 1979–1982 | Succeeded by Constantin Dăscălescu |
