= Doru-Viorel Ursu =

Romanian politician and lawyer (1953–2024)

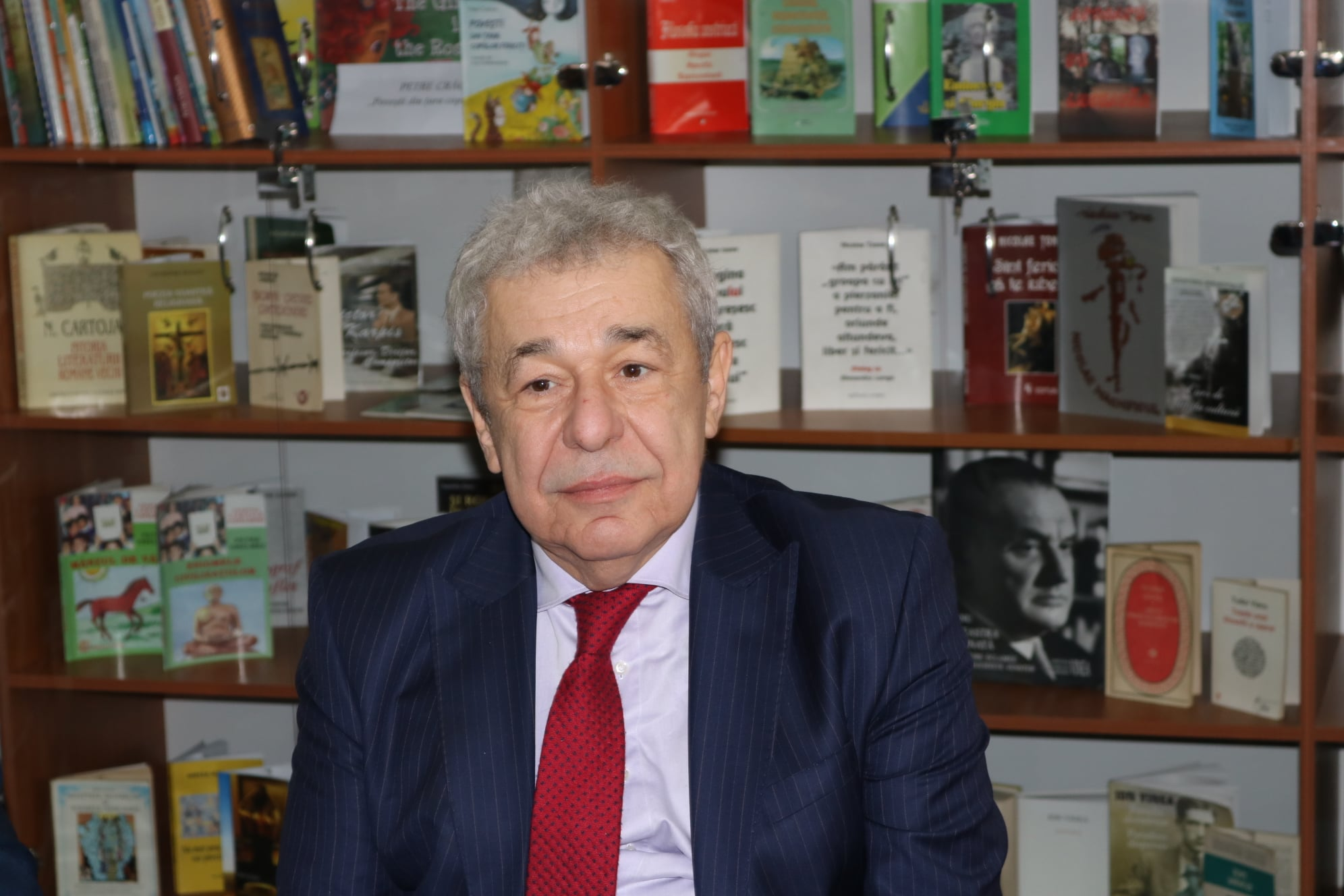

Doru-Viorel Ursu (1 March 1953 – 14 April 2024) was a Romanian politician and lawyer. A member of the National Salvation Front (FSN), he was minister of the interior in the Petre Roman cabinets, carrying his mandate between the Mineriads of 1990 and 1991.

== Biography ==
Born in Turnu Severin, Ursu graduated from the University of Bucharest's Faculty of Law, and later received his PhD from the same institution. He worked for the Bucharest Military Tribunal, serving as its vice president and, later, its president.

Following the 1989 Revolution, he became minister of the interior on 16 June 1990, when his predecessor, General Mihai Chițac, was relieved from office. This came in the wake of the June 1990 Mineriad, when miners from the Jiu Valley repressed the civic protest in Bucharest's University Square (known as the Golaniad). Ursu's alleged involvement in the events remains the topic of controversy, and his name repeatedly surfaced among those accused of covering up the actual death-toll and overall scale of violence. In 2003, Ziua newspaper reported that Ursu had authored an official account of the events in which he acknowledged that the miners had been transported to Bucharest with assistance from the authorities, that Chițac had ordered troops to offer the miners their full support and to open fire on demonstrators, and that as many as 1,200 protesters had been arrested. Official data authored by Ursu and Prosecutor-General Gheorghe Robu, released soon after the events, accounted for 185 people arrested.

Ursu lost his position after the Roman government was deposed by the new September 1991 Mineriad, but was appointed undersecretary of state at the Ministry of Foreign Affairs in the Theodor Stolojan cabinet, and later secretary of state, head of the Department for Local Public Administration.

In 1992, Ursu rallied with the opposition party formed around the pro-Roman faction of the FSN — known after 1993 under as the Democratic Party (PD) —, and won a seat in the Chamber of Deputies for Argeș County during the election of that year. Subsequently, he served on the Committee for Public Administration, Territorial Improvement and Environmental Balance, and on the Permanent Committee of the Chamber and Senate for Exercising Parliamentary Control over the Activity of the Romanian Intelligence Service (SRI). He left the PD in March 1995, and carried out his mandate as an independent.

In April 2005, the Association of Mineriad Victims argued that it had gathered enough evidence to incriminate Ursu, together with former president Ion Iliescu and former premier Petre Roman, for having organized and profited from the June 1990 events (replying on this issue, Roman argued that his cabinet had itself been targeted by the miners). The association's president, Viorel Ene, specifically accused Ursu and, among others, the SRI's Virgil Măgureanu, General Pavel Abraham, and Counter Admiral Cico Dumitrescu, of having overseen the transport of protesters arrested in downtown Bucharest to military facilities around the capital, an illegal measure which, reportedly, also resulted in a widespread incidence of beatings and the murder of several prisoners.

During the 2004–05 season, Doru-Viorel Ursu served as president of the Romanian Football Federation's Disciplinary Commission; he resigned in May 2005, citing irregularities in procedures (according to Ursu, sanctions for misconduct prescribed for local soccer clubs were regularly below standards imposed by FIFA).

Ursu died on 14 April 2024, at the age of 71, and was buried in Bucharest's Ghencea Military Cemetery.
