= Constantin Dăscălescu =

Romanian communist politician (1923–2003)

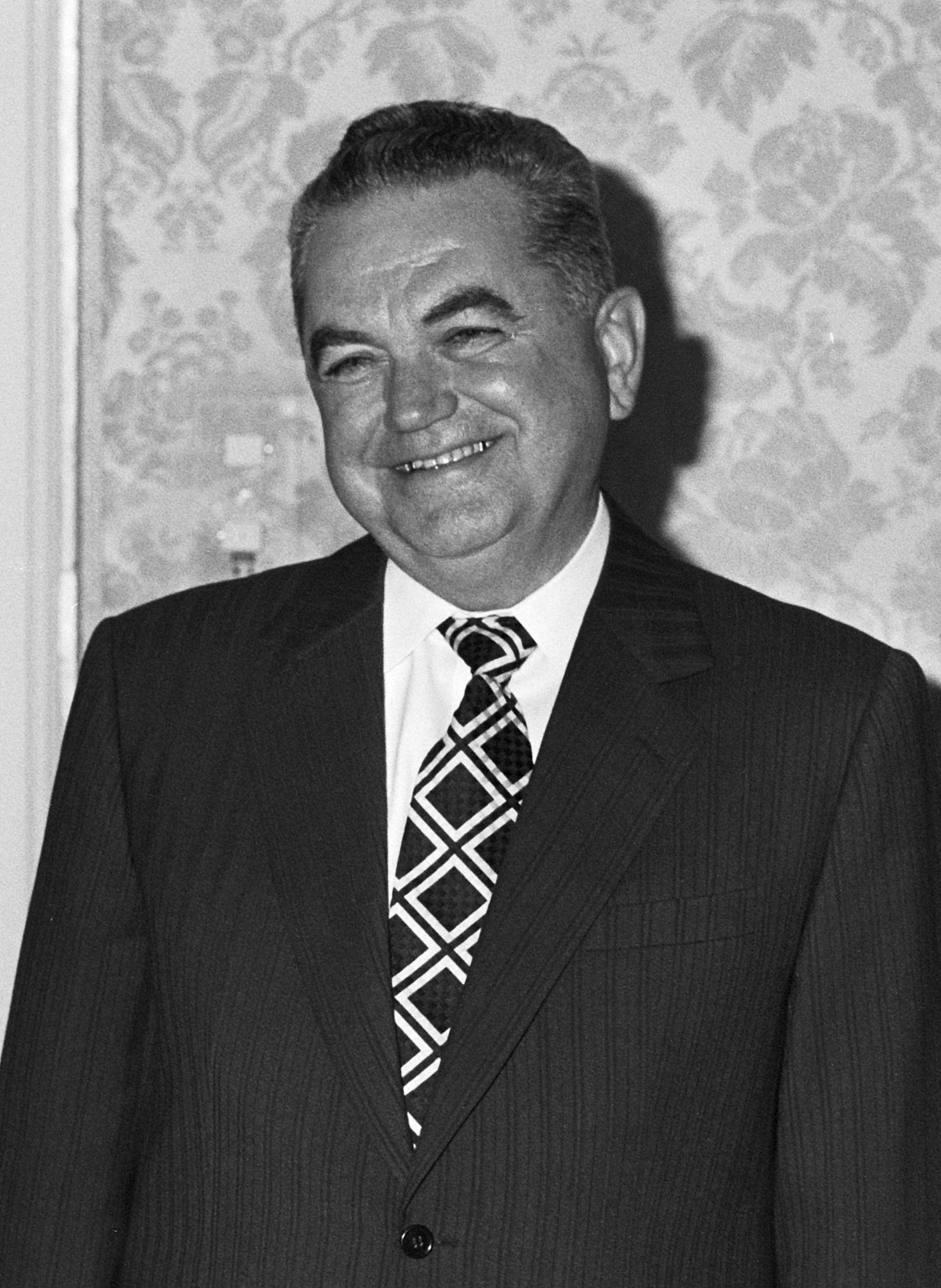
- Dăscălescu in 1983

52nd Prime Minister of Romania
- In office 21 May 1982 – 22 December 1989
- President: Nicolae Ceaușescu
- Preceded by: Ilie Verdeț
- Succeeded by: Petre Roman

Personal details
- Born: 2 July 1923 Breaza de Sus, Kingdom of Romania
- Died: 15 May 2003 (aged 79) Bucharest, Romania
- Party: Communist Party
- Education: Ștefan Gheorghiu Academy; International Lenin School
- Profession: Lathe operator

Constantin Dăscălescu (Note: /ˌdæskəˈlɛskuː/ DASK-ə-LESK-oo, Romanian: [konstanˈtin dəskəˈlesku]) (2 July 1923 – 15 May 2003) was a Romanian communist politician who served as Prime Minister of Romania during the communist rule of Nicolae Ceaușescu, from 21 May 1982 until the Romanian Revolution in 22 December 1989.

He was born in Breaza de Sus, Prahova County, to Nicolae and Stanca Dăscălescu. From 1937 to 1941 he trained as a metal lathe operator at a vocational school in his hometown, after which he started working at the Astra Română company in Câmpina. In October 1945 he joined the Romanian Communist Party (PCR), and stayed on his job until November 1947. From 1949 to 1962 he studied at various schools for communist cadres: in Ploiești, at the Ștefan Gheorghiu Academy in Bucharest, and at the International Lenin School in Moscow. At the same time, he advanced in the PCR hierarchy, and served as First Secretary of the Communist Party in Galați from 1965 to 1974.

He resigned from his position as Prime Minister under pressure from the revolutionaries gathered at the headquarters of the Central Committee of the PCR, right after Ceaușescu escaped from the building. In 1991, after the revolution, Dăscălescu was sentenced to life in prison. After five years he was released on medical grounds.

== Notes ==
Political offices
Preceded by Ilie Verdeț	Prime Minister of Romania; 1982–1989	Succeeded by Petre Roman
