= Dumitru Mazilu =

Romanian politician

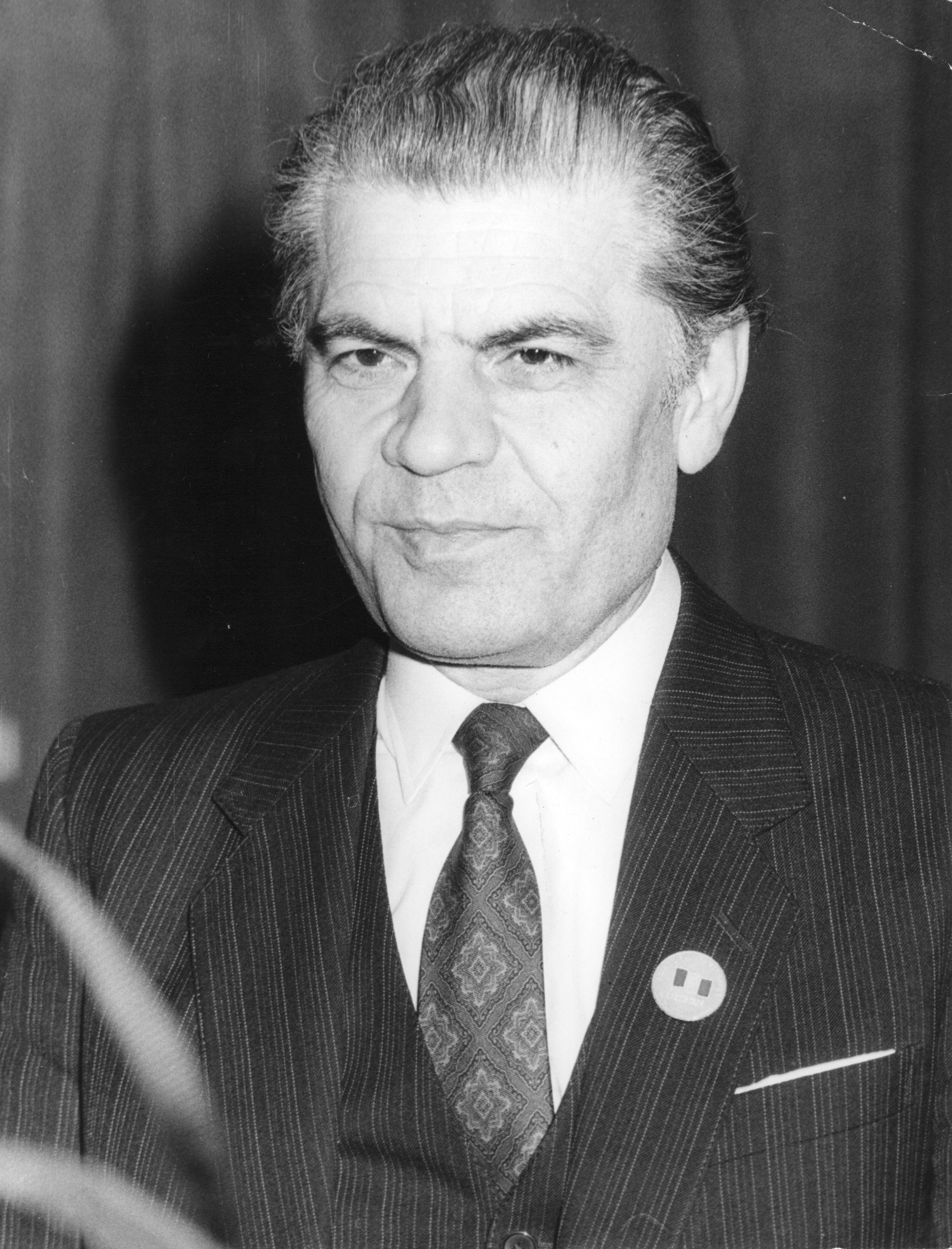
- Mazilu in 1990

Member of the National Salvation Front Council
- In office 22 December 1989 – 26 December 1989

Co-Founding Leader of the National Salvation Front
- In office 22 December 1989 – 26 January 1990 Serving with Ion Iliescu and Petre Roman
- Succeeded by: Ion Iliescu; Petre Roman

Personal details
- Born: 24 June 1934 (age 92) Bacău, Kingdom of Romania
- Party: Romanian Communist Party (before 1989); National Salvation Front (1989–1990)
- Education: University of Bucharest
- Profession: Politician, diplomat
- Known for: Romanian Revolution

Dumitru Mazilu (born 24 June 1934) is a Romanian politician. He had a key role in the events of the Romanian Revolution of December 1989 and in exposing the human rights abuses of the Ceaușescu regime.

== Professional career ==
Mazilu was born in Bacău. In 1952, he graduated from the Technical School of Engineers in Bacău. The same year, he became a Securitate officer and was promoted to the rank of lieutenant. In 1959, he graduated from the University of Bucharest with a law degree, obtaining a Ph.D. in the same field in 1964. As Mazilu studied for his Ph.D., he worked as a professor of law at Ștefan Gheorghiu Academy in Bucharest.

From 1965 to 1966, Mazilu served as director of Securitate school in Băneasa. According to the Report Armageddon VII of 2004, it is claimed that Mazilu had been dismissed from the management of the Securitate as a result of an attempt to falsify documents relating to a car accident. From 1965 to 1968, Mazilu he was reportedly responsible for investigating abuses and irregularities committed during the regime of Gheorghe Gheorghiu-Dej.

In the 1970s, Mazilu's academic career further expanded. In 1970, he was established as a university professor by the Ministry of Education. In the years 1970–1974, he was the scientific director of the Institute of Political Sciences in Bucharest. In 1974, he gained attention from American universities such as Harvard, Columbia, and UC Berkeley. This attention from foreign institutes solidified Mazilu's position in Romanian diplomacy. This led to Mazilu's appointment as a legal adviser at the Ministry of Foreign Affairs.

== Political dissidence in Ceaușescu's Romania ==
In 1985, Mazilu became involved in discussions of human rights and of the youth of the world. Around this time he drafted a report critical of the situation of human rights in Romania. Nicolae Ceaușescu was informed by the secret services that Mazilu intended to publish the report and forbade him to leave the country and therefore prevented him from presenting the report to the United Nations Organization. The report detailed Ceaușescu's policy of exporting the majority of Romania's food, and lowering living standards to quickly pay off foreign debts. Mazilu furthered criticized Ceaușescu's agricultural policy of destroying traditional farming centers in an effort to modernize Romania's farming industry with the introduction of more modern agricultural centers, claiming that this compromised peasant farmers as their farms were seen by Ceaușescu's administration as "breeding (grounds) of bourgeois liberalism that still (perpetuate) forms of private property".

From 1986 to 1989, Mazilu was placed under house arrest as a result of his criticisms of Ceaușescu's handling of human rights. As a result of Mazilu's critical report of Human Rights in Romania, he was formally fired from the Ministry of Foreign Affairs in 1987 and his diplomatic passport was withdrawn, preventing him from attending UN meetings. In May of the same year, Ceaușescu had a letter written to the UN which claimed that Mazilu had suffered a heart attack and was seriously ill.

Mazilu wrote a letter to the Secretary-General of the United Nations stating that he had been hospitalized twice, being forced to withdraw from a summit on 1 December 1987, stating that he would not withdraw his report. The next year, the UN Subcommission to request Mazilu's release. In response, Ceaușescu stated that Mazilu's detention was in accordance with Romanian law and that placing Mazilu on the diplomat list was redundant due to his illness, thus denying the requests of the UN.

However, despite being under house arrest, Mazilu was able to publish a clandestine report in Geneva in April 1989. The report was published by the United Nations in July of the same year. This report was similarly critical, stressing conditions of extreme hunger, cold, and fear in Romania .

Despite repeated attempts by the UN to free Mazilu, he remained under house arrest. In September 1989, four diplomats from the embassy of the United Kingdom, the Netherlands, the United States of America and Canada were prevented by the Securitate to visit Mazilu. Several radio stations including the BBC, Deutsche Welle and Radio France Internationale brought attention to the situation .

The United Nations eventually decided to take the situation to the International Court of Justice in the Hague. The subsequent hearing was held in October 1989 and in December 1989, Decision No 81/15 demanded that the Romanian authorities release Mazilu immediately and was voted upon unanimously, underling that Mazilu was to enjoy the diplomatic immunity of the United Nations as provided by Article 22 of the UN Convention on the privileges and immunities .

== During the Romanian Revolution ==
On the night of 21 December, in the midst of the Romanian Revolution, Mazilu was moved to prison along with his wife and son by the Securitate. The following day, after the Ceaușescu regime was overthrown, Mazilu and his family were released. The same day, Mazilu gave a speech at the government building now occupied by the National Salvation Front led by Ion Iliescu detailing his opposition to Communism .

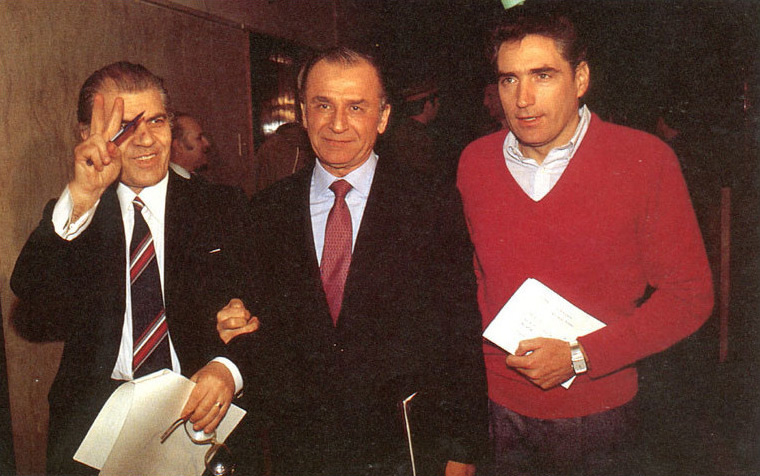
Mazilu (left) with Petre Roman (right) and Ion Iliescu (Centre).

Deeply moved, with the face swelled by the blows received, I told the people from where I came and underlined the anti-communist character of the Romanian Revolution. I reminded them that we were under the most oppressive totalitarian boot 45 years and that the country was never communist and would never be. We have proposed that our homeland be simply called ROMANIA, without any socialist or communist adjectives, and that the flag of the country be freed from the communist insignia. Encouraged by the approval of more than 200,000 people (the realistic estimation of the crowd in The Palace Market is up to 50,000 people – a.) present in the huge market, we read the Revolution's program platforms, structured in the 10 points analyzed above and proposed that the new power body be THE CIVIC FORUM, set up as a democratic power of Romanian citizens... And in closing we begged the Lord's help, saying the words "So to help us God!", 45 years forbidden not only in The Palace Square, but in all the markets and other public places in Romania...

— Dumitru Mazilu

Mazilu proposed the following points of civic reform:

- The abandonment of a single party state and the bringing about a democratic system with various present systems of government.
- The organization of free elections in the shortest possible time.
- Separation of legislative, executive and judicial powers in the state and the choice of all political leaders for one or not more than two mandates, respectively for five or ten years. Unlimited power dressed pathological forms. Nobody can claim the power for life.
- The restructuring of the entire national economy on the basis of the criteria of profitability and efficiency. The elimination of bureaucratic administrative methods of centralised economy driving and promoting entrepreneurship and competence in all sectors of the economy.
- Restructuring of agriculture by passing the land in the hands of those who work, which are its real masters.
- The reorganization of the Romanian education system according to the modern requirements.
- The positioning of structures of Romanian culture on a democratic and humanistic basis. The elimination of ideological dogma which has caused so many damages to the Romanian people and the promotion of real values of humanity. The elimination of lies and of imposture and the bringing about some criteria of competence and justice in all fields of activity. The passage of the press, radio and television in the hands of a despotic family in the hands of the people.
- Compliance with national minorities' rights and freedoms and ensure full their contracts enjoy equality of rights.
- Re-orienting the entire external trade of the country, on the basis of the requirements of the satisfaction with first of all the needs of the population. Prohibition on transfer of resources to the national economy with a view to obtaining hard currency at any price. The adoption of the measures necessary for the carrying out of external trade with full compliance with the requirements of economic efficiency.
- Changing the entire foreign policy of the country to serve the promotion of good-neighbourliness, friendship and peace in the world.

After his speech was broadcast on television, Dumitru Mazilu was appointed Vice President of the National Salvation Front, which took power after Ceaușescu's removal. The FSN proclamation read by Ion Iliescu on 22 December 1989 was written by Dumitru Mazilu with some editing by Silviu Brucan. Despite this brief cooperation, tensions between Mazilu and Iliescu began as a result of the big tent ideology adopted by the FSN to present a united front against Nicolae Ceaușescu. Brucan and Iliescu believed that Communism should be kept in place, but Ceaușescu should be removed, whereas Mazilu believed that Communism was inherently flawed and was in need of replacement by Capitalism and Petre Roman believed that Socialism was Communism's natural replacement. These tensions culminated when during a march of remembrance for the fallen of the revolution on 12 January 1990, Mazilu attempted to use the dissatisfaction of the crowd to seize leadership of the FSN from Iliescu. His attempt, which included him jumping on top of a tank and shouting, "death to the former Securitate officers!" was largely unsuccessful apart from the removal of a few former Communist activists from the leadership of the FSN.

After Dumitru Mazilu's failure to gain prominence as a leader in the National Salvation Front, the newspaper, Free Romania published a piece made up of information from Mazilu's political biography. The information in the piece was largely about his past under the regime of Gheorghe Gheorghiu-Dej. After being discredited from public opinion, Mazilu resigned from the leadership of the FSN on 26 January 1990, accusing the Communist practices within the political framework of the new political power of Stalinism.

In March 1991, Dumitru Mazilu was reportedly attacked in Geneva as he was preparing another report critical of the government. There was speculation that former Securitate officers were behind the incident; furthermore, it was alleged that this was part of larger campaign of assaults on other journalists and opposition leaders, including the murder of Ioan Petru Culianu.

== Post-Revolution activity ==
After the revolution, Mazilu left for a time to Switzerland. In 1990, he was chosen as the chairman of the Romanian Institute for Human Rights and youth. In the years 1991–1993, Mazilu won a lawsuit filed by the Romanian authorities regarding his improper firing from the Ministry of Foreign Affairs during the Ceaușescu regime. He obtained his previously held role which he had lost in 1986 at the Ministry of Foreign Affairs.

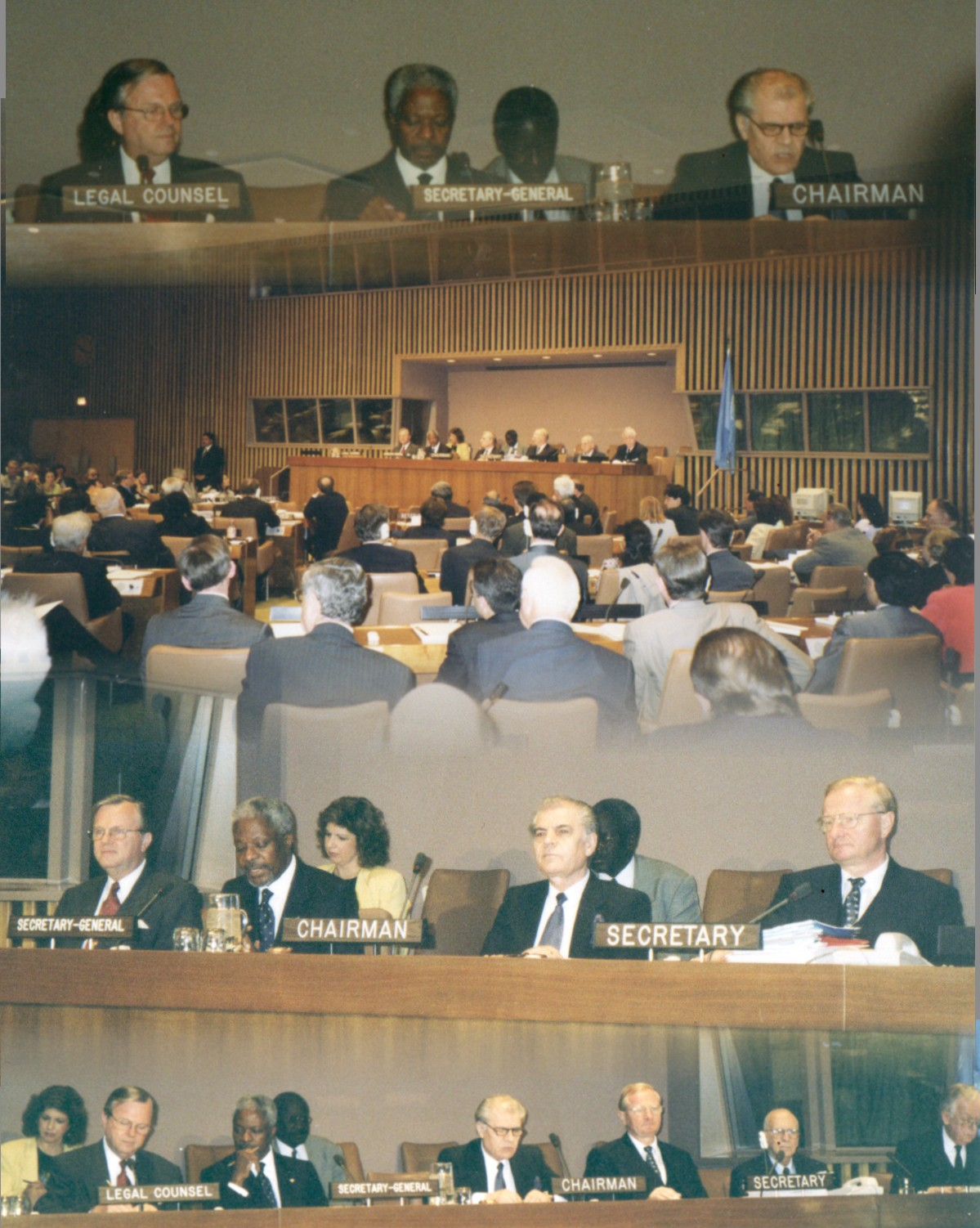
Dumitru Mazilu at the United Nations Assembly, Vienna, 1997

Mazilu returned to diplomacy, becoming the head of Romania's diplomatic mission in the Philippines (1993 and 1994). Dumitru Mazilu was appointed as ambassador to the international organizations in Vienna, and later, Romania's representative to OSCE from 1994 to 1997. This saw another surge in Mazilu's diplomatic career. He held various positions of power including vice president of the United Nations Organization for the Development of Industry in 1995, vice president of the United Nations Commission for the peaceful uses of the cosmic space from 1995 to 1997, the chairman of the Working Group of the General Conference of the International Atomic Energy Agency from 1996 to 1997, vice president and president of the United Nations Commission on International Trade Law from 1998 to 2000, member of the International Diplomatic Academy in 2002.

Presently, Mazilu holds a position as a Professor consultant at the University of Bucharest and is the author of several books. In 2003, he was nominated for a Nobel Peace Prize by the International Diplomatic Academy. The same year, he became a member of the Scientific Council of the United Nations for distance learning.

In December 2004 – the 15th anniversary of the revolution – there was a symbolic reconciliation between Mazilu and Iliescu, who with his cabinet had since adopted social democracy, thus quelling earlier ideological tensions between the two. Mazilu was appointed to the leadership of the Institute of the Romanian Revolution of December 1989. This institution is engaged in the study and study of the Romanian revolutionary process.

In November 2013, Mazilu was interviewed in the General Prosecutor's Office as a further investigation of the events of 1989 in light of accusations surrounding Iliescu. "We hope to find the truth," he commented. The following year, Mazilu testified against Iliescu, stating "I am certain now that revolutions are conceived by idealists, enacted by fighters and taken advantage of by opportunists". Due to his role in the revolution, Mazilu's comments have raised him criticism with some Iliescu supporters branding him a traitor in light of the recent charges against Iliescu and the revolution of 1989.

Mazilu is fluent in English, French, Russian and Italian.

== Awards and recognition ==
Mazilu has been awarded the titles of Doctor Honoris Causa of both Romanian and foreign educational institutions, namely: American College of Switzerland (1991); Alexandru Ioan Cuza Police Academy of Bucharest (September 2002); Albert Schweitzer International University of Geneva (November 2002); Honorary Member of the academic community of the George Bacovia University (September 2003) of Bacău; Doctor of Ovidius University of Constanța (April 2006). He is also a member of the Central European Science and Art Academy (since 2000); member of the Balkan Academy of Sciences (since May 2002); member of the International Diplomatic Academy (since June 2002); associate member of the European Academy of Sciences, Arts and Letters (since July 2002).

Mazilu has received numerous awards for his scientific and legal activity: "Simion Bărnuțiu" award of the Romanian Academy (1973); "Media Peace Prize" (Geneva, 1980); "Hugo Grotius" Award (New York, 1984); "Andrei Rădulescu" Award (1999) and "Vespasian Pella" (2002), awarded by The Jurists of Romania's Union of Excellence, awarded by Radio in Bucharest, January 2004. Also, in December 2004, his work "Diplomacy. Diplomatic and consular law" was recognized with the Jurists' Union's "Vespasian Pella" award in Romania.

In 1999 he was awarded the "Medaglia Pontificia" by the Vatican State, and in 2003 – at the "new Architecture of Peace" Congress – he was awarded the title "Architecture of Peace". In 2002, he received the International order "Science – Education – Culture", Commander rank, awarded by the European information Academy. In 2004 he received the Order of the Star of Romania, Knight rank.

In recognition of his contribution to the defense of human rights during the years of the communist dictatorship in Romania, Mazilu was nominated for the Nobel Peace Prize by the International Diplomatic Academy in 2003.

== Published works ==
Mazilu has published 43 books and over 500 specialized studies and articles. These include the following.

- Treaty on the Law of the sea (1980, as revised in 2002);
- The Stolen Revolution (1991);
- Peace Treaty on the right (1998);
- General Theory of entitlement (1999);
- Rights of Man – Concept, demanding and contemporary realities (2000);
- Right of International Trade – the general part (2000);
- Right of International Trade – Special Part (1999);
- European integration. Community law and European Institutions (2000);
- Public International Law (2 vol. 2001–2002);
- Treaty on the theory and practice of the negotiations (2002);
- Diplomacy. As the diplomatic and consular (2003);
- The Law of Peace (2003);
- Path to Truth (2003);
- Prohibition of War as a Means of Solving International Conflicts (2003);
- Peace – a dialectic Process (2004);
- Right of International Trade. The current trends and developments (2004);
- Fundamental principles and norms of the Law of Peace (2005);
- Norms on organization and conducting war (2005);
- European Diplomacy (2008).
