= Bogdan Niculescu-Duvăz =

Romanian politician and architect (1949–2019)

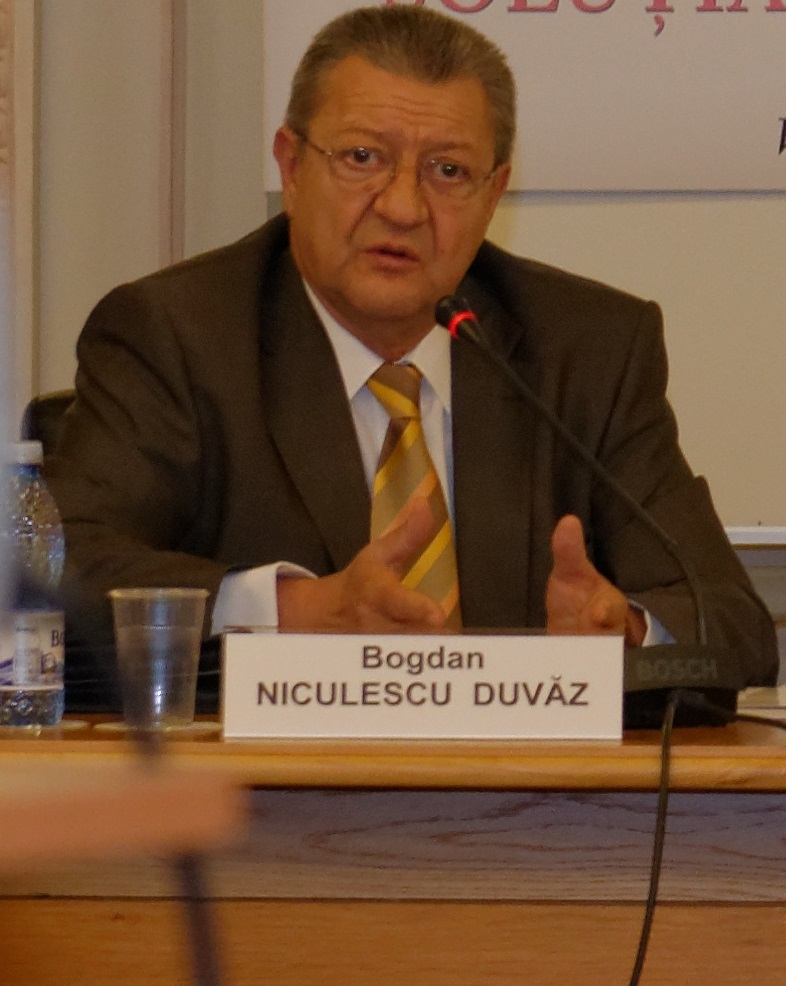
Bogdan Niculescu-Duvaz at Atelierele Viitorului - 3rd Edition, Parliament Palace

Bogdan Niculescu-Duvăz (Romanian pronunciation: [boɡˈdan nikuˈlesku duˈvəz]; December 14, 1949 – November 16, 2019) was a Romanian politician and architect. A member and twice minister of the Democratic Party (PD), he joined the Social Democratic Party in 2003, and was again a minister in 2004. Niculescu-Duvăz was a member of the Chamber of Deputies between 1990 and 2016.

== Biography ==
=== Early life ===
Born in Bucharest, he graduated from the Ion Mincu Institute in 1977, and subsequently worked as architect for the Urban Planning Institute in Tulcea, then as a designer for the Bucharest Home Appliances Research Institute, and ultimately as a designer of lighting appliances for the Carpaţi Institute. He entered politics in early 1990, in the wake of the Romanian Revolution, joining the National Salvation Front (FSN), becoming its Secretary and, in 1991, Vice President. In January 1990, Niculescu-Duvăz also joined the provisional governing body (the Provisional National Unity Council, CPUN), as a simple member.

=== Career ===
In the 1990 elections, he won a seat in the Chamber, representing Bucharest. He became a Minister of Youth and Sport in the second Petre Roman cabinet (June 1990), resigning his position in the Chamber in late July. In early 1992, following the September 1991 Mineriad and Roman's resignation from office, Niculescu-Duvăz joined the latter in creating the opposition wing of the FSN, which was to become the PD in 1993. After briefly serving on the Bucharest City Council in early 1992, Niculescu-Duvăz was reelected to the Chamber in the 1992 and 1996 suffrages, representing Constanța County, and served on the Chamber Committee for Public Administration and Territorial Improvement. He joined Victor Ciorbea's coalition government, created around the Romanian Democratic Convention, holding the office of Minister for Relations with Parliament (1996-1998).

He was the PD's Vice President, and, during the elections of 2000, its campaign coordinator. Also in 2000, Niculescu-Duvăz was again elected a deputy for Constanţa County, and was delegated to the Parliamentary Assembly of the Council of Europe, briefly serving on several of its Commissions. From February to November of the same year, he was Vice President of the Chamber.

He resigned from the PD in 2003, and soon after joined the PSD, becoming the Executive Secretary of its National Bureau. A Quaestor of the Chamber in September 2002 and a member of several Committees (Foreign Policy, European Integration, and the Common Committee of the Chamber and Senate for Drafting Legislative Proposals in Respect to Electoral Laws), Niculescu-Duvăz was again assigned to a ministerial position in Adrian Năstase's executive, serving as Minister-Delegate for Relations with the Social Partners (July–December 2004).

Former President Emil Constantinescu alleged, in 2005 and 2006, that his successor and former PD president Traian Băsescu had been a member of Communist Romania's secret police, the Securitate, and contended that, together with Petre Roman and Victor Babiuc, Niculescu-Duvăz had witnessed Băsescu's acknowledgment that this was the case. Constantinescu repeatedly asked for the three alleged witnesses to be summoned for a hearing with the CNSAS (the Council charged with investigating Securitate affiliations).

In early 2007, Bogdan Niculescu-Duvăz voiced the PSD's calls for the first Călin Popescu-Tăriceanu Justice and Truth government to undergo restructuring, while contending that the latter's realignment along with the National Liberal Party was not a solution to crisis.

=== Personal ===
Niculescu-Duvăz was married and the father of two. He was a trophy hunter, a member of the General Association of Sport Hunters and Fishermen (since 1990), and founder of the Romanian yacht club.
