= List of members of the National Salvation Front Council =

Council of the National Salvation Front
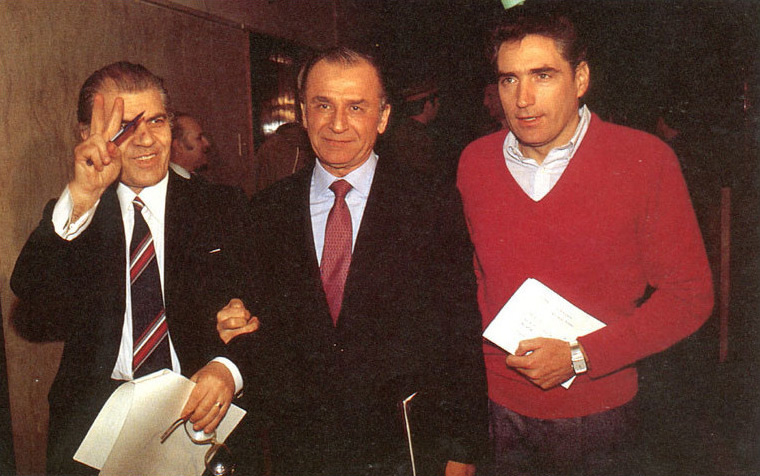
- L-R: Dumitru Mazilu, Ion Iliescu, and Petre Roman, the FSN Council's three dominant members on 23 December 1989.

Presidency of Romania
- Acting; 22 December 1989 – 26 December 1989
- Preceded by: Nicolae Ceaușescu
- Succeeded by: Ion Iliescu

This is a list of members of the National Salvation Front Council (CFSN), the provisional governing organization in Romania after the National Salvation Front (FSN) seized power during the Romanian Revolution, on 22 December 1989.

== Members ==
The list was broadcast on the national television and first published in Monitorul Oficial, no. 1 on the same day, 22 December 1989.

- Marian Baciu
- Alexandru Bârlădeanu
- Ana Blandiana
- Silviu Brucan
- Valeriu Bucurescu
- Ion Caramitru
- Constantin Cârjan
- Cristina Ciontu
- Doina Cornea
- Marțian Dan
- Dan Deșliu
- Mircea Dinescu
- Géza Domokos
- Captain Emil Dumitrescu
- Manole Gheorghe
- General Ștefan Gușă
- Ion Iliescu (identified as the "spokesman")
- Cazimir Ionescu
- Magdalena Ionescu
- Eugenia Iorga
- Mihai Ispas
- Constantin Ivanovici
- Captain Mihail Lupoi
- Corneliu Mănescu
- Dumitru Mazilu
- Marian Mierla
- Mihai Montanu
- Aurel Dragoș Munteanu
- Vasile Neacșa
- Paul Negrițiu
- Sergiu Nicolaescu
- Petre Roman
- Adrian Sârbu
- General Victor Stănculescu
- Bogdan Teodoriu
- László Tőkés
- Ovidiu Vlad
- Gelu Voican Voiculescu
- General Gheorghe Voinea

=== Executive Bureau ===
In the evening of 27 December 1989, the Executive Bureau of the CFSN was established. The Bureau consisted of 11 members:

- President: Ion Iliescu
- First vice-president: Dumitru Mazilu
- Vice-presidents: Cazimir Ionescu and Károly Király
- Secretary: Marțian Dan
- Members: Bogdan Teodoriu, Vasile Neacșa, Silviu Brucan, Gheorghe Manole, Ion Caramitru, and Neculae Radu

=== Quitting the CFSN ===
- 23 January 1990: Doina Cornea
- 26 January 1990: Dumitru Mazilu
- 29 January 1990: Ana Blandiana
- 4 February 1990: Silviu Brucan
