= Democratic Force (Romania) =

Political party in Romania

Democratic Force Forța Democrată
- Abbreviation: FD
- President: Petre Roman
- Founder: Petre Roman
- Founded: 2004
- Dissolved: 2013
- Split from: Democratic Party
- Merged into: National Liberal Party
- Ideology: Social democracy Democratic socialism Left-wing populism Left-wing nationalism Social conservatism
- Political position: center-left to left-wing

Website
- http://www.fortademocrata.ro/

The Democratic Force (Romanian: Forţa Democrată, FD) was a social-democratic political party in Romania without parliamentary representation. It was led by the Senator and former Prime Minister Petre Roman. In 2012, the party merged with the National Liberal Party (PNL), but was dissolved by the Romanian authorities only in 2013.

== Election results ==
=== Legislative elections ===
Election	Chamber			Senate			Position	Status
Election	Votes	%	Seats	Votes	%	Seats	Position	Status
2004	79,376	0.78	0 / 332	95,953	0.93	0 / 137	7th	
2008	Did not compete							
2012	Did not compete							

=== Presidential elections ===
Election	Candidate	Votes	%	Position
2004	Petre Roman	140,702	1.4	7th
2009	Did not compete			
