= Constantin Popescu =

Constantin Popescu may refer to:

- Constantin Popescu (politician)
- Constantin Popescu (director)
- Constantin Popescu (handball coach)
