= Ștefan Gheorghiu Academy =

Coordinates: 44.434037°N 26.057285°E

The Ștefan Gheorghiu Academy (Romanian: Academia Ștefan Gheorghiu, in full: Academia de învățămînt social-politic Ștefan Gheorghiu de pe lîngă CC al PCR — roughly, Ștefan Gheorghiu Academy for Socio-Political Education in Relation to the Central Committee of the Romanian Communist Party) was a university created and used by the Romanian Communist Party (PCR) for training its cadres for executive and agitprop-related functions.

== History ==
The institution was established as Universitatea Muncitorească a PCR (PCR Workers' University) and began functioning on March 21, 1945, in Bucharest, apparently on Ana Pauker's initiative. Its first leaders were rector Barbu Lăzăreanu, a literature professor, and secretary Constantin Ionescu Gulian, a Stalinist philosopher. The name Ștefan Gheorghiu was added on February 10, 1946, in memory of an early 20th-century Romanian social-democrat.

Another school with much the same purpose, Școala Superioară de Științe Sociale A. A. Jdanov (A. A. Jdanov Upper School of Social Sciences), was created separately; the two eventually merged.

The Ștefan Gheorghiu Academy was dissolved after the Romanian Revolution of 1989.
