= Ion Iliescu =

President of Romania (1990–1996; 2000–2004)

Ion Iliescu IO, OCTM, GOKT, OWE, OMRI
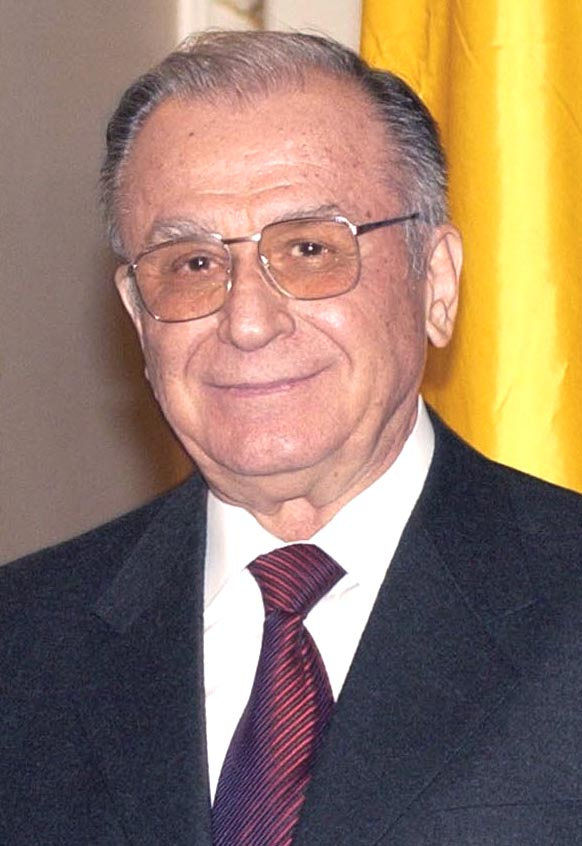
- Iliescu in 2004

President of Romania
- In office 20 December 2000 – 20 December 2004
- Prime Minister: Mugur Isărescu; Adrian Năstase
- Preceded by: Emil Constantinescu
- Succeeded by: Traian Băsescu
- In office 26 December 1989 – 29 November 1996 (Note: Acting: 26 December 1989 – 20 June 1990) (Note: As chairman of the Council of the National Salvation Front to 13 February 1990, chairman of the Provisional Council of National Unity to 20 June 1990.)
- Prime Minister: Petre Roman; Theodor Stolojan; Nicolae Văcăroiu
- Preceded by: Nicolae Ceaușescu; National Salvation Front Council (interim government)
- Succeeded by: Emil Constantinescu

Member of the National Salvation Front Council
- In office 22 December 1989 – 13 February 1990

Member of the Senate of Romania
- In office 22 November 1996 – 14 December 2008 (Note: No Senate membership during his second presidential term (2000-2004))

Member of the Chamber of Deputies
- In office 9 June 1990 – 27 September 1990

Co-Founding Leader of the National Salvation Front
- In office 22 December 1989 – 7 April 1992 Serving with Petre Roman and Dumitru Mazilu (Note: Dumitru Mazilu resigned from the leadership of the FSN on 26 January 1990)
- Succeeded by: Petre Roman

Founding Leader of the Democratic Front of National Salvation
- In office 7 April 1992 – 11 October 1992 (Note: FDSN/PDSR/PSD membership suspended while President of Romania)
- Succeeded by: Oliviu Gherman

President of the Party of Social Democracy in Romania (Note: Not to be confused with Romanian Social Democratic Party)
- In office January 1997 – 20 December 2000
- Preceded by: Oliviu Gherman
- Succeeded by: Adrian Năstase
Positions held during the Communist era
Member of the State Council
In office 1979–1980
Member of the Great National Assembly
In office 1957–1961
In office 1965–1973
In office 1975–1985
Member of the Central Committee of the Communist Party
In office 1965–1984
Minister of Youth and First Secretary of the Union of Communist Youth
In office 11 December 1967 – 17 March 1971
Prime Minister	Ion Gheorghe Maurer
Preceded by	Petru Enache (as First Secretary of the Union of Communist Youth)
Succeeded by	Dan Marțian
President of the National Water Council
In office 28 August 1979 – 16 March 1984
Prime Minister	Ilie Verdeț; Constantin Dăscălescu
Preceded by	Florin Ioan Iorgulescu
Succeeded by	Ion Badea
President of Iași County Council
In office 1974–1979
Vice-President of Timiș County Council
In office 1971–1974

Personal details
- Born: 3 March 1930 Oltenița, Romania
- Died: 5 August 2025 (aged 95) Bucharest, Romania
- Party: Social Democratic Party (2004–2025)
- Other political affiliations: Romanian Communist Party (1953–1989); National Salvation Front (1989–1992); Democratic National Salvation Front (1992); Independent politician (1992–1996; 2000–2004); Party of Social Democracy in Romania (1996–2000)
- Spouse: Nina Șerbănescu (m. 1951)
- Parents: Alexandru Iliescu (father); Maria Dumitru Toma (mother)
- Education: Bucharest Polytechnic Institute; Moscow State University
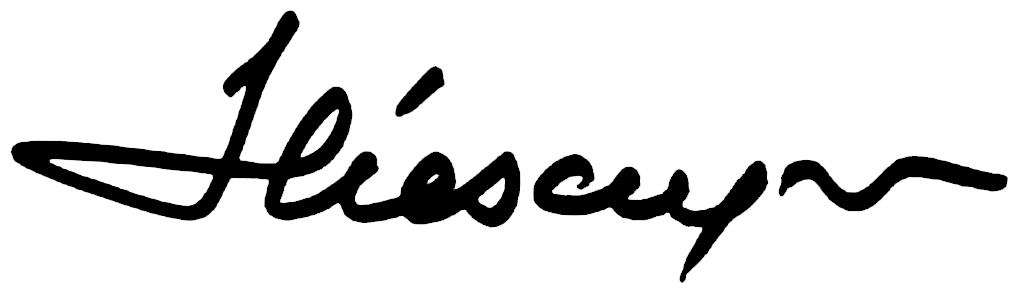
- Signature
- De facto leader of the RSR: ← Ceaușescu; (Last in role) →

Ion Iliescu (Note: Romanian pronunciation: [iˈon iliˈesku]) (3 March 1930 – 5 August 2025) was a Romanian politician and engineer who served as the first and third President of Romania since the country's transition to democracy, from 1990 to 1996 and 2000 to 2004. Iliescu was also a senator for the Social Democratic Party (PSD), which he founded and where he became the honorary president for the rest of his life.

Iliescu joined the Romanian Communist Party (PCR) in 1953 and became a member of its Central Committee in 1965. Beginning with 1971, he was gradually marginalised by Nicolae Ceaușescu. He had a leading role in the Romanian Revolution, becoming the country's president in December 1989. In May 1990, he became Romania's first freely elected head of state. After a new constitution was approved by popular referendum, he served a further two terms, firstly from 1992 to 1996 and then secondly from 2000 to 2004, separated by the presidency of Emil Constantinescu, who defeated him in 1996.

In 2004, during his presidency, Romania joined NATO and negotiations to join the EU intensified. In April 2018, Iliescu was charged in Romania with committing crimes against humanity by "approving military measures, some of which had an evidently diversionary character" during the deadly aftermath of the country's 1989 revolution. In 2020, a judge rejected the case due to irregularities in the indictment. The indictment was remade; in 2023, the Court of Appeals approved a trial for it. At the time of his death, he was the oldest living president of Romania.

== Early life ==
=== Family and childhood ===
Ion Iliescu was born on 3 March 1930 in Oltenița, a city in the Muntenia region of the Kingdom of Romania. He was the son of Alexandru Iliescu (1901–1945) and Maria Dumitru Toma. His mother, of Roma origin, abandoned him when he was one year old and married another man.

His father was a railroad worker, trade unionist and member of the Romanian Communist Party (PCR), which was illegal at the time. In 1931, he represented the party at the 5th PCR Congress held in Gorikovo, near Moscow, but did not return to Romania until 1935. In 1937, he was arrested for his political activism, which was considered subversive. He served his sentence in Jilava prison (in 1939) and in the labour camps of Caracal and Târgu Jiu (from June 1940 to August 1944), where he came into conflict with Gheorghe Gheorghiu-Dej, who expelled him from the party. In 1940, he married Maria P. Iliescu, with whom he had two children, Crișan and Mihai Alexandru Iliescu died in 1945, when Ion was fifteen years old.

His paternal grandfather, Vasili Ivanovici, was a Bolshevik Jew who fled the Russian Empire because he was persecuted by the Tsarist authorities. Around 1895, he settled in Oltenița and changed his name to Iliescu. He had four children (Alexandru, Eftimie, Aristița and Verginia).

Ion Iliescu was raised by his paternal grandparents and stepmother, and in 1939 he was adopted by his aunt Aristița, a cook at the residence of communist activist Ana Pauker, who helped him study in the Soviet Union. During the years of the regime, he was often accompanied to official events by his stepmother, while details about his natural mother were only revealed in the 1990s.

=== Studies ===
Ion Iliescu studied fluid mechanics at the Bucharest Polytechnic Institute and then as a foreign student at Moscow Power Engineering Institute. During his stay in Moscow, he was the secretary of the "Association of Romanian Students"; it is alleged that he met Mikhail Gorbachev, although Iliescu always denied this. However, years later, president Nicolae Ceaușescu probably believed that there was a connection between the two, since during Gorbachev's visit to Romania in July 1989, Iliescu was sent outside of Bucharest to prevent any contact.

Iliescu learned to speak English after the 1989 Revolution; he also spoke French, Russian and some Spanish.

== Early political career (1944–1989) ==
=== Entry into politics ===
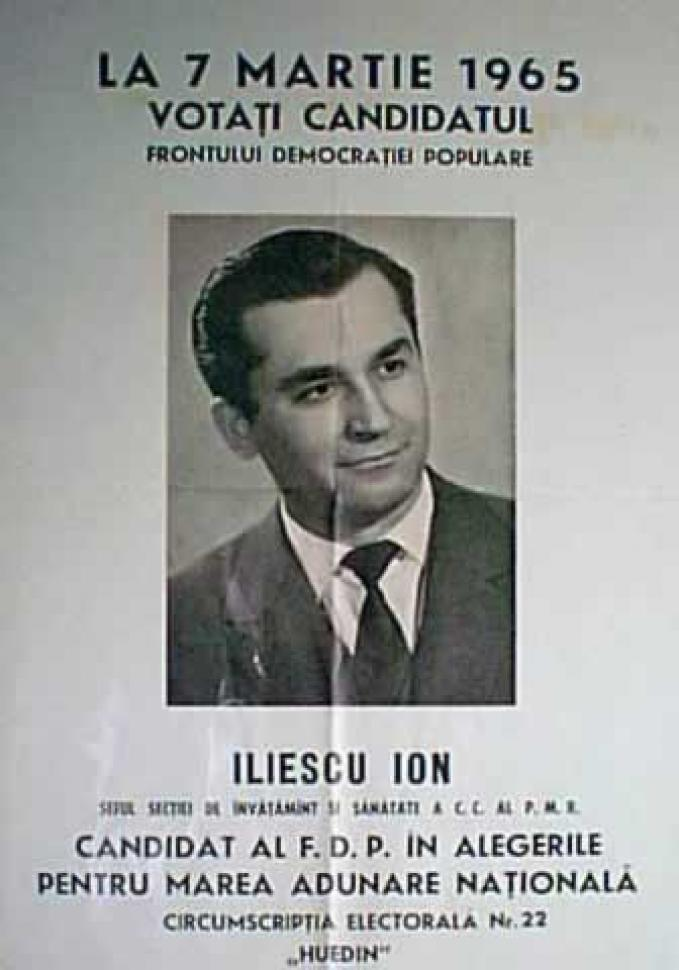
Campaign poster, 1965

He joined the Union of Communist Youth in 1944 and the Communist Party in 1953, becoming a career politician from that point forward. He was nominated and elected to be the secretary of the Central Committee of the Union of Communist Youth in 1956, and later elected to the Central Committee of the Romanian Communist Party in 1965. He also briefly served as the head of the Department of Propaganda, before taking the job of Minister for Youth-related Issues in 1967. In 1972, he was pressured to resign from this job, since Ceaușescu did not fully trust him and believed that Iliescu would be his successor.

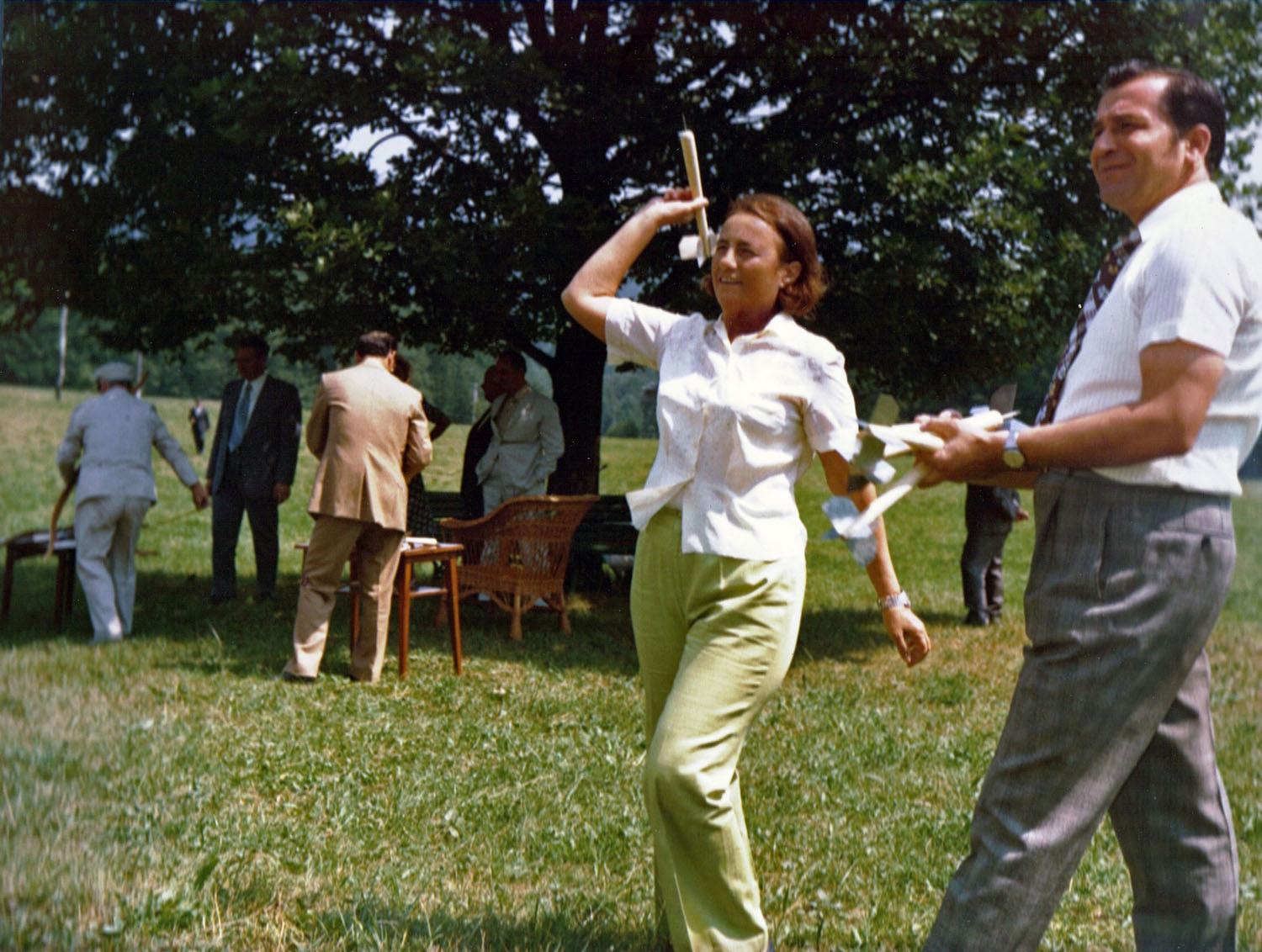
Iliescu in 1976 with Elena Ceaușescu

After this point, he was effectively sidelined from the national political scene yet retained his seat on the Central Committee of the Party; however Ceaușescu could not have him ousted from it until 1985 since he required a majority within the Committee to approve such a measure. Iliescu was demoted to vice-president of the Timiș County Council (1972–1974), and later president of the Iași Council (1974–1979). Until 1989, he was in charge of the Editura Tehnică publishing house. After his removal from the Central Committee in 1985, the Securitate (secret police) kept a closer watch on him, as he was openly in opposition to Ceaușescu's rule while serving on the Committee.

=== 1989 Romanian Revolution ===
On 22 December 1989, following Ceaușescu's escape from Bucharest, revolutionaries occupied several institutions in the Romanian capital, such as the PCR Central Committee building, the Ministry of Defence and the headquarters of the national television station. At the same time, several groups spontaneously organised themselves to take over the management of state bodies. One of these was led by former prime ministers Ilie Verdeț and Constantin Dăscălescu, but it did not receive the support of the population or the army. Ion Iliescu, on the other hand, was the leader of another group that included communist dissidents who had opposed Ceaușescu, whose authority was recognised by the Minister of Defence Victor Atanasie Stănculescu on the afternoon of 22 December 1989. He first learned of the revolution when he noticed the Securitate was no longer tailing him.

The Ceaușescus were captured, hauled before a drumhead court-martial, and executed on Christmas Day. Years later, Iliescu conceded that the trial and execution were "quite shameful, but necessary" to end the chaos that had riven the country since Ceaușescu's overthrow.

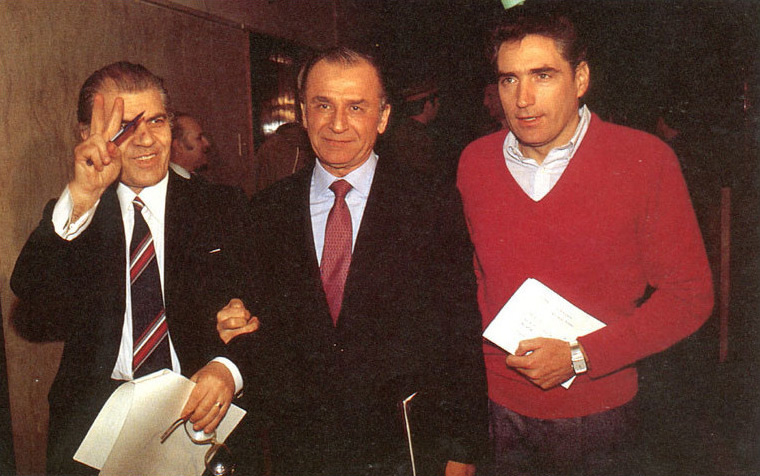
Iliescu (centre) with FSN members Dumitru Mazilu (left) and Petre Roman (right) on 23 December 1989, one day after the formation of the FSN

Iliescu proposed multi-party elections and an "original democracy". This is widely held to have meant the adoption of Perestroika-style reforms rather than the complete removal of existing institutions; it can be linked to the warm reception the new regime was given by Mikhail Gorbachev and the rest of the Soviet leadership, and the fact that the first post-revolutionary international agreement signed by Romania was with that country.

Iliescu later evoked the possibility of trying a "Swedish model" of social democracy and democratic socialism.

Rumours abounded for years that Iliescu and other high-ranking Party officials had been planning to overthrow Ceaușescu, but the events of December 1989 overtook them. For instance, Nicolae Militaru, the new regime's first national defence minister, said that Iliescu and others had planned to take Ceaușescu prisoner in February 1990 while he was out of the capital. However, Iliescu denied this, saying that the nature of the Ceaușescu regime—particularly the Securitate's ubiquity—made advance planning for a coup all but impossible.

== Presidency (1990–2004) ==
=== First term (1990–1996) ===
The National Salvation Front (FSN) subsequently decided to organise itself as a party and participate in the 1990 general election—the first free election held in the country in 53 years–with Iliescu as its presidential candidate. The FSN won a sweeping victory, taking strong majorities in both chambers. In the separate presidential election, Iliescu won handily, taking 85 per cent of the vote, still the largest vote share for a free presidential election. He became Romania's first democratically elected head of state. To date, it is the only time since the Fall of Communism that a president has been elected in a single round.

Iliescu and his supporters split from the Front and created the Democratic National Salvation Front (FDSN), which later evolved into the Party of Social Democracy in Romania (PDSR), then the Social Democratic Party (PSD) (see Social Democratic Party of Romania). Progressively, the Front lost its character as a national government or generic coalition, and became vulnerable to criticism for using its appeal as the first institution involved in power sharing, while engaging itself in political battles with forces that could not enjoy this status, nor the credibility.

Under the pressure of the events that led to the Mineriads, his political stance has veered with time: from a proponent of Perestroika, Iliescu recast himself as a Western European social democrat. The main debate around the subject of his commitment to such ideals is linked to the special conditions in Romania, and especially to the strong nationalist and autarkic attitude visible within the Ceaușescu regime. Critics have pointed out that, unlike most Communist-to-social democrat changes in the Eastern Bloc, Romania's tended to retain various cornerstones.

Romania adopted its first post-Communist Constitution in 1991. In 1992, Iliescu won a second term when he received 61% of the vote in the second round. He immediately suspended his NSDF membership; the Constitution does not allow the president to be a formal member of a political party during his term.

He ran for a third time in 1996 but, stripped of media monopoly, he lost in the second round to Emil Constantinescu, his second-round opponent in 1992. Over 1,000,000 votes were cancelled, leading to accusations of widespread fraud. Nevertheless, Iliescu conceded defeat within hours of polls closing, making him the only incumbent president to lose a bid for re-election since the end of Communism.

=== Second term (2000–2004) ===
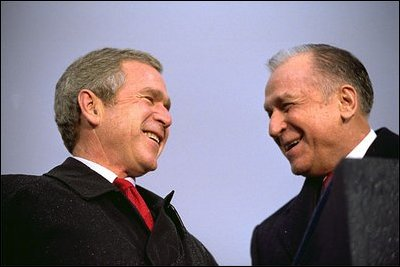
Iliescu and U.S. President George W. Bush in 2002

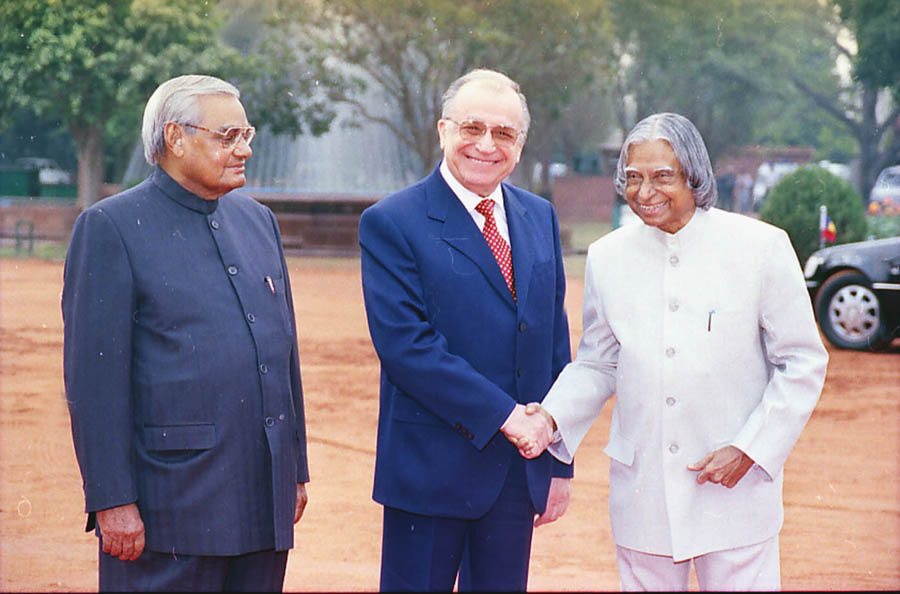
Iliescu with Indian President A.P.J. Abdul Kalam and Indian Prime Minister Shri Atal Bihari Vajpayee in 2004

In the 2000 presidential election, Iliescu won the first round with 36.4%, while Greater Romania party candidate Corneliu Vadim Tudor secured second place with 28.3%. In the runoff on 10 December, Iliescu defeated Tudor with 66.8% of the vote.

He began his third term on 20 December of that year, ending on 20 December 2004. The centre-right was severely defeated during the 2000 elections due largely to public dissatisfaction with the harsh economic reforms of the previous four years as well as the political instability and infighting of the multiparty coalition. Tudor's extreme views also ensured that most urban voters either abstained or chose Iliescu. The Năstase government, which came to power in this term of Iliescu, continued part of the series of reforms started by the previous governments between 1996 and 2000. During Iliescu's second term, Romania joined NATO and completed the negotiations for the accession to the European Union. One of the actions of the presidential institution during Iliescu's second term was the establishment of the "International Commission for the Study of the Holocaust in Romania", following diplomatic incidents caused by the Holocaust denial practiced by important figures in the country's leadership. The commission, led by Nobel Peace Prize laureate Elie Wiesel, drew up a report on the Holocaust in Romania, report assumed and declared "state document" by Iliescu.

== Post-presidency (2004–2025) ==
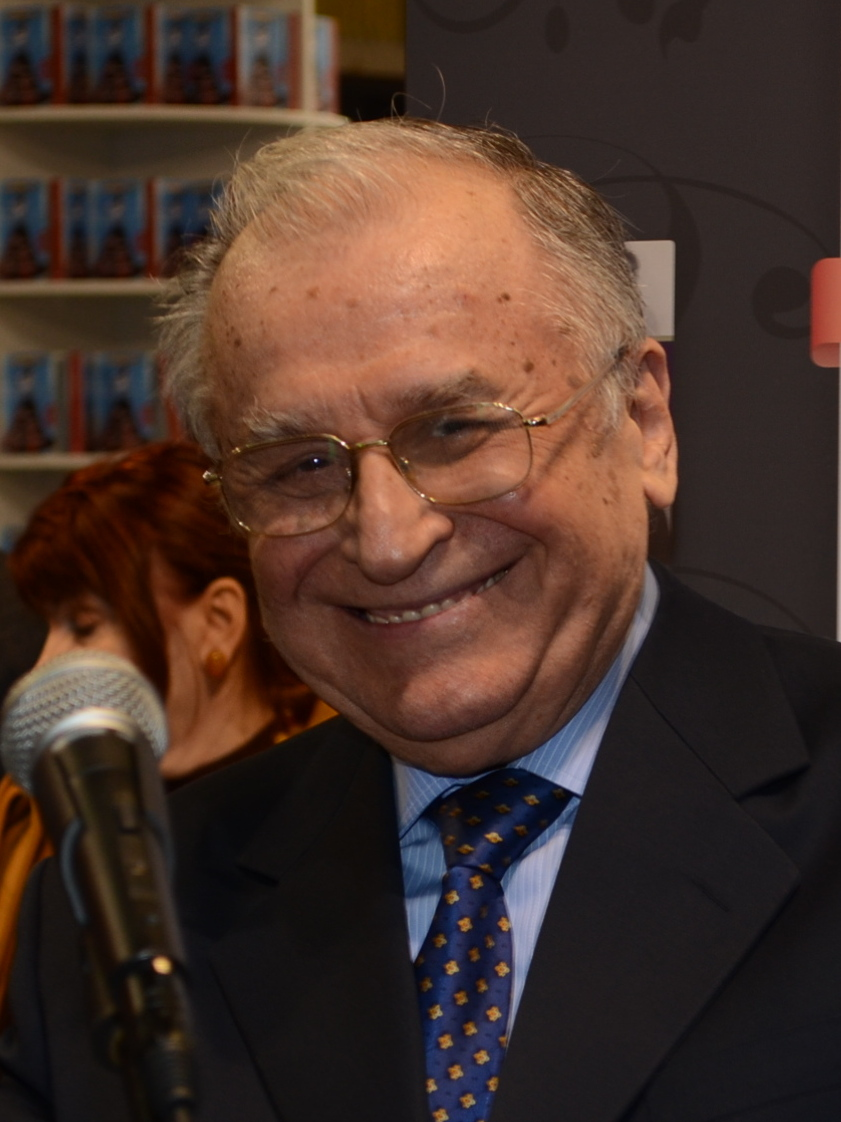
Iliescu in 2013

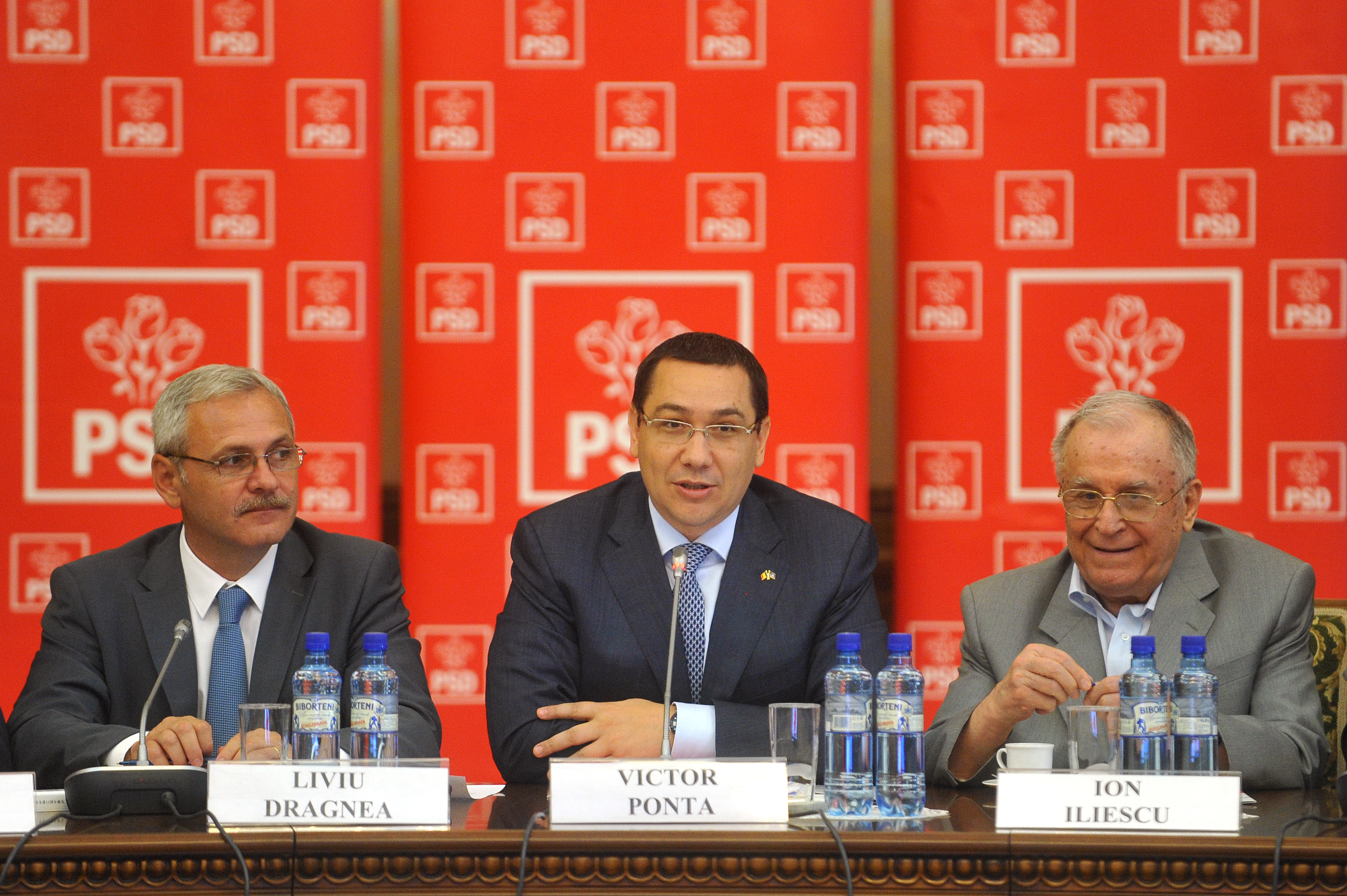
Iliescu with Victor Ponta and Liviu Dragnea, 29 May 2014

Due to the constitutional limit, Iliescu was ineligible for a third term in 2004, but won a four-year Senate mandate in the general election, as so in 1996, when he failed to be re-elected.

In the PSD leadership election of 21 April 2005, Iliescu lost the vote to Mircea Geoană, but was elected as honorary president in 2006, a position without official executive authority in the party.

In 2009, he appeared in a scene in the film Medalia de onoare ("Medal of Honour").

On 19 May 2025, Iliescu congratulated Nicușor Dan following his victory over George Simion in the second round of the 2025 presidential election on the previous day.

=== Avangarda interviews ===
On 19 June 2025, during his hospitalisation, a series of podcast interviews titled Avangarda with Ionuț Vulpescu, his former advisor and culture minister, was released, having been recorded between a few years to a few weeks prior to that point. Iliescu had on 6 December 2024 planned to publish a statement regarding the 2024 Romanian presidential election, but did not due to its annulement following Călin Georgescu's first round victory due to accusations of Russian interference. The statement was published on 19 June along with the podcast.

=== Accusations of crimes against humanity ===
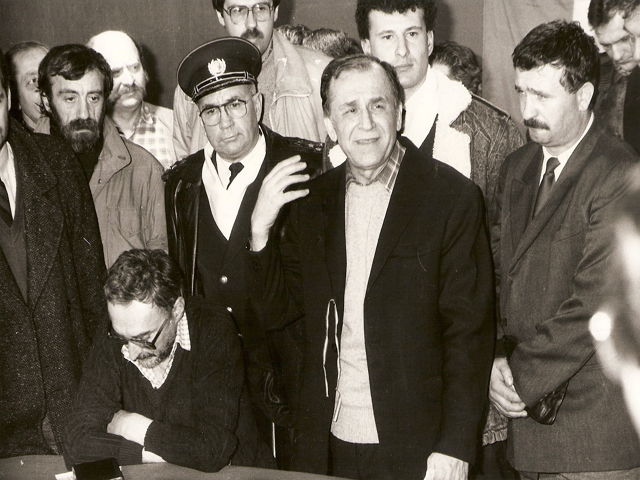
Iliescu at the TVR during the Romanian Revolution of 1989. The broadcast was one of the key points of accusation against Iliescu.

In 2016, a previously closed legal case regarding crimes against humanity committed by the interim government headed by Iliescu during the Romanian Revolution was reopened. In 2015, after 26 years of prolonged investigation, the authorities concluded that there was no evidence with which they could prosecute. In 2016, the case was ordered to be re-examined by the interim General Prosecutor. By 2017, military prosecutors had alleged that the events of 1989 were orchestrated by a misinformation campaign on the part of Iliescu's government, which were disseminated through broadcasting media. Reportedly, this investigation lead to speculation of whether the conflict of 1989 could be classified as a revolution, or else as a coup d'état.

In April 2018, the General Prosecutor asked that Iliescu be put on trial. President Klaus Iohannis approved this request, as well as the proceeding of the prosecution of Petre Roman. Iliescu was charged for his alleged role in the killing of 862 people during the revolution, at which time he headed the National Salvation Front (FSN) interim government, as well as the spreading of misinformation. Allegations included Iliescu's apparent involvement in the Mineriad case, in which miners quashed protests against the government. The initial charges, brought forward in 2005, were shortly dropped, until 2014 when the European Court of Human Rights found Iliescu's lack of investigation into the events of Mineriad to be in violation of human rights to life, freedom from inhumane, and degrading treatment and demonstration, and again in 2015, when the Military Prosecutor's Section within the Prosecutor's Office and the Justice Office reopened investigations into the Mineriad protests, accusing Iliescu, along with other accused perpetrators, of coordinating a general and systematic attack against the civilian population during the events from 13 until 15 June 1990 in Bucharest. On 13 June 2017, the Prosecutor's Office indicted Iliescu for crimes against humanity for actions taken by Iliescu during the Mineriad protests. The statement released by the office claimed that the attack illegally involved forces of the Interior Ministry, Defence Ministry, Romanian Intelligence service, as well as the miners and other workers from various areas of the country. The office further alleged that attacks were also carried out against peaceful residents. The case was ultimately rejected in December 2020, as the judges found that the indictment was void and thus could not be used in a trial.

On 8 April 2019, Iliescu was officially charged with crimes against humanity. Iliescu's lawyer Adrian Georgescu complained that the file was illegitimate due to its lack of a prosecutor. In December 2019, Iliescu's trial began to focus on allegations that he had intentionally spread disinformation through the use of broadcast media with the aid of Aurel Dragoș Munteanu, a member of the FSN and the director of TVR during the revolution of 1989, meaning that he was greatly influential in the FSN's ability to foster support in the Romanian public. Among the claims investigated were Iliescu's broadcast claim that "unknown terrorists" were responsible for the deaths of Elena and Nicolae Ceaușescu.

Amid candlelight vigils and other memorial services during the 30th anniversary of the Romanian Revolution, several survivors of the conflict spoke out against Iliescu's trial, with many claiming it was a publicity stunt on the part of Iohannis to gain popularity from the Romanian population that still seek the truth about the revolution. Iliescu's trial was not expected to reach a definitive conclusion. The trial was first postponed to February 2020 due to Iliescu's declining health and the slow pace of legal proceedings. This case was also rejected in June 2020, as a judge decided the indictment was not valid. However, the Bucharest Court of Appeal decided in October 2023 that the trial could begin.

== Personal life ==
=== Marriage ===
Iliescu met Elena "Nina" Șerbănescu in 1948 when they were both 18-year old students, he at the Saint Sava High School and she at the Iulia Hasdeu High School, in Bucharest. With Nina only being one day younger than Iliescu, they were married on 21 July 1951. The couple had no children as Nina Iliescu suffered three miscarriages.

=== Illness, death and state funeral ===
Iliescu previously underwent surgery in 2019 for pericardial effusion. In September 2023, he was hospitalised in Bucharest. On 11 June 2025, Iliescu entered the intensive care unit of the Prof. Dr. Agrippa Ionescu Emergency Clinical Hospital in Bucharest due to respiratory difficulty. On 15 June, his condition was reported to be stable, being diagnosed with lung cancer and undergoing an endobronchial intervention under general anaesthesia on the following day. By 18 June, Iliescu's condition had worsened, on that day undergoing another endobronchial intervention to maintain the permeability of the upper airways. On 19 June, his condition was reported to be slightly improving.

Iliescu died after almost two months hospitalisation, on 5 August 2025, at the age of 95. His death was mocked by several officials of the ruling Save Romania Union (USR), which opposed the declaration of a day of national mourning in honour of Iliescu. Similar positions were also taken by representatives of the Alliance for the Union of Romanians.

Iliescu's state funeral was held on 6 and 7 August, beginning with him lying in state at the Cotroceni Palace in Bucharest, where numerous incumbent and former leading politicians were attended, such as Emil Constantinescu, Traian Băsescu, Theodor Stolojan, Nicolae Văcăroiu, Adrian Năstase, Sorin Grindeanu, Viorica Dăncilă, Marcel Ciolacu and Prime Minister Ilie Bolojan. His burial date on 7 August was designated as a day of national mourning by the government. USR ministers boycotted Iliescu's funeral, just like President Nicușor Dan, despite Iliescu expressing positive views after he won the 2025 elections. Iliescu was buried in Ghencea 3 cemetery in Bucharest, following a Romanian Orthodox ceremony led by the vicar bishop of Bucharest.

== Controversies ==
Though enjoying a certain popularity due to his opposition to Ceaușescu and image as a revolutionary, his political career after 1989 was marked by multiple controversies and scandals. Public opinion regarding his tenure as president is still divided.

=== Alleged KGB connections ===
Some alleged Iliescu had connections to the KGB; the allegations continued during 2003–2008, when Russian dissident Vladimir Bukovsky, who had been granted access to Soviet archives, declared that Iliescu and some of the NSF members were KGB agents, that Iliescu had been in close connection with Mikhail Gorbachev ever since they had allegedly met during Iliescu's stay in Moscow, and that the Romanian Revolution of 1989 was a plot orchestrated by the KGB to regain control of the country's policies (gradually lost under Ceaușescu's rule). The only hard evidence published was a discussion between Gorbachev and Bulgaria's Aleksandar Lilov from 23 May 1990 (after Iliescu's victory in the 20 May elections) in which Gorbachev said that Iliescu held a "calculated position", and that despite sharing common views with Iliescu, Gorbachev wanted to avoid sharing this impression with the public.

=== Mineriads ===
Iliescu, along with other figures in the leading FSN, was allegedly responsible for calling the Jiu Valley miners to Bucharest on January (January 1990 Mineriad) and June (June 1990 Mineriad) 1990 to end the protests of the citizens gathered in University Square, Bucharest, protests aimed against the ex-Communist leaders of Romania (like himself). The pejorative term for this demonstration was the Golaniad (from the Romanian golan, rascal). On 13 June, an attempt of the authorities to remove from the square around 100 protesters, which had remained in the street even after the May elections had confirmed Iliescu and the FSN, resulted in attacks against several state institutions, such as the Ministry of Interior, the Bucharest Police Headquarters and the National Television. Iliescu issued a call to the Romanian people to come and defend the government, prompting several groups of miners to descend on the capital, armed with wooden clubs and bats. They trashed the University of Bucharest, some newspaper offices and the headquarters of opposition parties, claiming that they were havens of decadence and immorality – drugs, firearms and munitions, "an automatic typewriter", and fake currency. The June 1990 Mineriad in particular was subject to wide criticism, both domestically and internationally, with the historian Andrei Pippidi comparing the events to Nazi Germany's Kristallnacht. Government inquiries later established that the miners were infiltrated and instigated by former Securitate operatives. In February 1994 a Bucharest court "found two security officers, Colonel Ion Nicolae and warrant officer Corneliu Dumitrescu, guilty of ransacking the house of Ion Rațiu, a leading figure in the Christian Democratic National Peasants' Party, during the miners' incursion and stealing $100,000".

=== King Michael ===
In 1992, three years after the revolution which overthrew the Communist dictatorship, the Romanian government allowed King Michael I to return to his country for Easter celebrations, where he drew large crowds. In Bucharest, over a million people turned out to see him. Michael's popularity alarmed the government of President Iliescu, so Michael was forbidden to visit Romania again for five years. In 1997, after Iliescu's defeat by Emil Constantinescu, the Romanian Government restored Michael's citizenship and again allowed him to visit the country.

=== Pardons ===
In December 2001, Iliescu pardoned three inmates convicted for bribery, including George Tănase, former Financial Guard head commissioner for Ialomița County. Iliescu had to revoke Tănase's pardon a few days later due to the media outcry, claiming that "a legal adviser was superficial in analysing the case". Later, the humanitarian reasons invoked in the pardon were contradicted by another medical expert opinion. Another controversial pardon was that of Dan Tartagă, a businessman from Brașov who, while drunk, had run over and killed two people on a pedestrian crossing. He was sentenced to three years and a half but was pardoned after only a couple of months. Tartagă was later sentenced to a two-year sentence for fraud.

Most controversial of all, on 15 December 2004, a few days before the end of his last term, Iliescu pardoned 47 convicts, including Miron Cozma, the leader of the miners during the early 1990s, who had been sentenced in 1999 to 18 years in prison in conjunction with the September 1991 Mineriad. This has attracted harsh criticism from all Romanian media. Many of the pardoned had been convicted for corruption or other economic crimes, while one had been imprisoned for his involvement in the attempts at suppressing the 1989 Revolution.

=== Decorating Corneliu Vadim Tudor ===
In the last days of his president mandate, he awarded the Order of the Star of Romania (rank of ceremonial knighthood) to the controversial, nationalist politician Corneliu Vadim Tudor, a gesture which drew criticism in the press and prompted Nobel Peace Prize winner Elie Wiesel, fifteen Radio Free Europe journalists, Timișoara mayor Gheorghe Ciuhandu, songwriter Alexandru Andrieș, and historian Randolph Braham to return their Romanian honours in protest. The leader of the Democratic Alliance of Hungarians in Romania, Béla Markó, did not show up to claim the award he received on the same occasion. President Traian Băsescu revoked the award granted to Tudor on 24 May 2007, but a lawsuit is ongoing even after Băsescu's decree was declared constitutional.

=== Black sites ===
Iliescu was mentioned in the report of the Council of Europe investigator into illegal activities of the CIA in Europe, Dick Marty. He was identified as one of the people who authorised or at least knew about and should have stood accountable for the operation of a CIA black site at Mihail Kogălniceanu airbase from 2003 to 2005, in the context of the war on terror. In April 2015, Iliescu confirmed that he had granted a CIA request for a site in Romania, but was not aware of the nature of the site, describing it as a small gesture of goodwill to an ally in advance of Romania's eventual accession to NATO. Iliescu further stated that had he known of the intended use of the site, he would certainly not have approved the request.

== Public opinion and legacy ==
According to the TVR show "100 Greatest Romanians" from 2006, launched as a campaign to identify the greatest Romanians of all time, out of 100 "Great Romanians" chosen by the participants, Iliescu came in 71st place. He was ranked below his predecessor Nicolae Ceaușescu and the incumbent president Traian Băsescu, but above Emil Constantinescu, who did not appear on the list.

== Awards ==
=== Domestic ===
- Order of the Star of the Romanian Socialist Republic, First Class (1971)
- Emblema de Onoare al Armatei României ("The Romanian Army's Badge of Honour") – 24 October 2012

=== Foreign ===
- Azerbaijan: Istiglal Order (2004)
- Croatia: Grand Cross of the Grand Order of King Tomislav (2003)
- Denmark: Knight of the Order of the Elephant (2004)
- Estonia: Collar of the Order of the Cross of Terra Mariana (2003)
- Italy: Knight Grand Cross with Grand Cordon of the Order of Merit of the Italian Republic – 15 October 2003
- Kazakhstan: Order of Friendship (2003)
- Lithuania: Grand Cross of the Order of Vytautas the Great (2001)
- Philippines: Grand Collar of the Order of Sikatuna (2002)
- Poland: Order of the White Eagle (2003)
- Poland: Grand Cross of the Order of Merit of the Republic of Poland (2004)
- Serbia and Montenegro: Order of the Yugoslav Great Star (2004)
- Slovakia: Grand Cross (or 1st Class) of the Order of the White Double Cross (2002)
- Spain: Knight Grand Cross with Collar of the Order of Civil Merit – 10 June 2003
- Uruguay: Medal of the Oriental Republic of Uruguay (1996)
