= Victor Stănculescu =

Romanian general and politician (1928–2016)

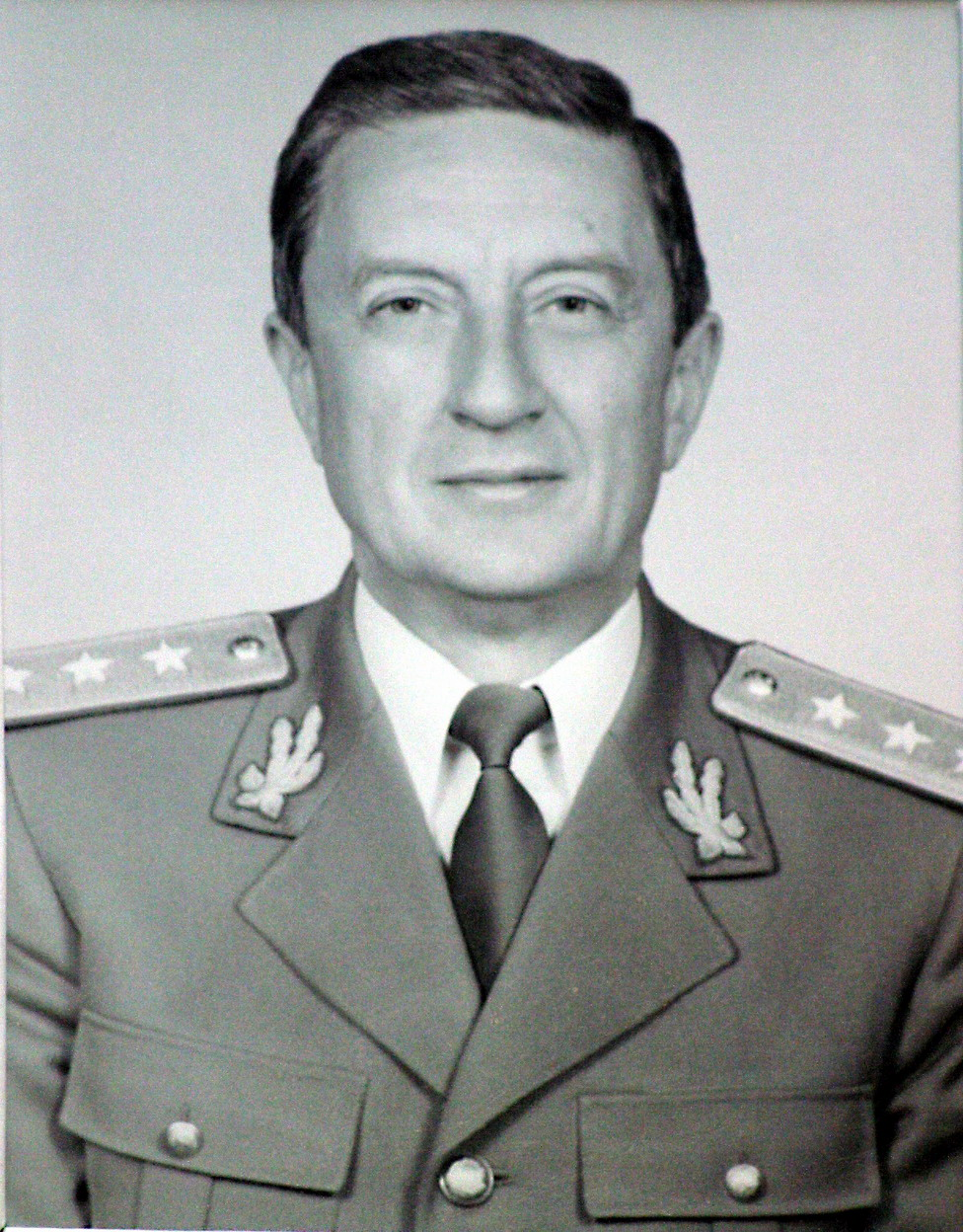

Minister of National Defence of Romania
- Acting; 22 December 1989 – 26 December 1989
- President: Nicolae Ceaușescu FSN Council
- Preceded by: Vasile Milea
- Succeeded by: Nicolae Militaru
- In office 16 February 1990 – 29 April 1991
- President: Ion Iliescu
- Prime Minister: Petre Roman
- Preceded by: Nicolae Militaru
- Succeeded by: Niculae Spiroiu

Personal details
- Born: Victor Atanasie Stănculescu; 10 May 1928 Tecuci, Kingdom of Romania
- Died: 19 June 2016 (aged 88) Ghermănești, Ilfov County, Romania
- Education: Carol I National Defence University

Victor Atanasie Stănculescu (10 May 1928 – 19 June 2016) was a general of Romania during the Communist era. He played a central role in the overthrow of the dictatorship by refusing to carry out the orders of Romanian dictator Nicolae Ceaușescu during the Romanian revolution of December 1989. His inaction allowed the citizens demonstrating in Bucharest against the government to seize control. In addition, as the defense minister on 25 December 1989, Stănculescu organized the trial and execution of Ceaușescu and his wife, Elena Ceaușescu.

Following the revolution, Stănculescu served terms as Minister of National Economy and Minister of Defense until 1991.

In 2008, Stănculescu and another general, former Interior Minister Mihai Chițac, were convicted of aggravated manslaughter by the Supreme Court for the shooting deaths of pro-democracy protesters in Timișoara, during the Romanian Revolution of 1989. Sentenced to fifteen years' imprisonment, he was freed in 2014.

He died in 2016 at age 88. His remains were cremated at the Vitan-Bârzești Crematorium.
