= September 1991 Mineriad =

- Part of the mineriads
- Date: September 25–28, 1991
- Location: (Romania) Bucharest
- Caused by: low wages, high prices, job insecurity
- Goals: Higher wages; Resignation of Prime Minister Petre Roman and President Ion Iliescu
- Methods: Demonstrations; Occupations; Rioting; Revolt; Vandalism; Picketing
- Concessions: resignation of Prime Minister Petre Roman and his cabinet.; wage increases

Number
10,000 miners from Jiu Valley	

Casualties
- Deaths: 4
- Injuries: 455

September 1991 Mineriad was a political action and physical confrontation between the miners of the Jiu Valley and the Romanian authorities, that led to the resignation of Prime Minister Petre Roman's government. Led by Miron Cozma, president of the Jiu Valley Coal Miners Union, the miners engaged in a series of actions beginning in the 1990s referred to as "mineriads" whereby large numbers of miners traveled to the Romanian capital of Bucharest and engaged in demonstrations and sometimes violent confrontations against counter-demonstrators and government authorities.

== Causes ==
During the June 1990 Mineriad, the miners were called in by the Ion Iliescu government to "protect the Revolution" by opposing the crowds who were protesting the government (the Golaniad). As a reward, the miners were promised better wages and living conditions, promises that were not kept.

Starting in September 1990, the Petre Roman government had begun shock therapy: fast-paced economic and political reforms with the goal of transforming Romania's economy into a market economy, and away from the Communist planned economy. Prices were to be liberalized in three stages and the subsidies for food, which compensated workers' relatively low wages, were cut, while the privatization laws brought the specter of unemployment. The workers most affected by these reforms felt that the people who gained most from this Romanian Revolution were not the workers (who came to see themselves as the underdogs of society), but a new class of businessmen and entrepreneurs.

The reforms led to severe inflation (prices grew by over 200%), a large increase in unemployment (from virtually zero in December 1989 to over one million—11% of the urban workers—in 1991) and food shortages, leading to a growing popular discontent.

The workers most threatened by the market were the miners, as was the case of the Donbas miners in the Soviet Union, or the Sheffield miners during Margaret Thatcher premiership in the United Kingdom.

== Demands ==
The miners demanded higher wages, lower prices and the resignation of Petre Roman's government, as well as the resignation of president Ion Iliescu.

== Riots ==
On September 25, 1991, the miners, mostly from Petroșani and Târgu Jiu, hijacked two trains bound for Bucharest and marched toward the government's capitol building, asking to meet with officials, a demand ignored by the government.

In Bucharest's Victory Square, in front of the capitol building, the crowd, estimated at 10,000 people (mostly miners, but also some Bucharesters), began throwing stones and petrol bombs at the government buildings, setting a corner of the building in fire. The miners were armed with sticks, metal pipes, chains, rubber hoses and axes, and were equipped with helmets and rubber boots.

The police began fighting the miners and used tear gas to disperse the crowds, an action which was successful toward the evening. However, the miners later reassembled in front of the Television building.

President Iliescu responded with an address on public radio, in which he made an appeal for law and order and for "rational behavior and patriotic feeling". Prime Minister Roman condemned the violence and asked them not to let passions dominate.

The following day, on September 26, Prime Minister Roman was forced to resign. Nevertheless, the riots continued as the miners continued to arrive in Bucharest and demand President Ion Iliescu's resignation as well. Clashes between the protesters, the Police and Army continued throughout the city, as the miners attempted to break into the Parliament building. The government building was surrounded by tanks and defended with tear gas.

Ion Iliescu eventually met with a representative group of miners and told them that all their demands would be met, but riots continued for the rest of the day.

Protests continued for a third day around the Cotroceni Palace, as the miners, continuing to demand Iliescu's resignation, stormed the palace's gates and threw rocks at the security forces, which responded again with birdshots and tear gas. At the end of the day, miners began returning to Jiu Valley.

On September 28, the remaining miners was dispersed from the University Square by the gendarmes, failing in their threat of remaining on the streets of Bucharest until President Iliescu resigned.

== Aftermath ==
During the riots, three people were killed and hundreds of other wounded. Two bystanders, Andrei Frumușanu and Aurica Crăiniceanu, were shot and killed by a Major of the Protection and Guard Service, Vasile Gabor. The Romanian authorities refused to cooperate with the courts afterwards, in a case in which evidence had been destroyed by the Romanian institutions. The families of the two victims sued the Romanian state at the European Court of Human Rights, which found the Romanian state guilty of breaking the Article 2 of the European Convention on Human Rights.

Adrian Severin, deputy Prime Minister, argued that it was a "crypto-Communist coup d'état" and that these people belonged to the class which had privileges during the previous communist regime.

Mugur Isărescu, governor of Romania's Central Bank noted that while the miners and other workers were shouting "Down with Communism!", their demands were "communist-style demands", such as job security and higher wages, and that they attacked privately owned shops—the few private enterprises that existed in Romania.

In 1999, the High Court of Cassation and Justice of Romania found Miron Cozma, the leader of the miners, guilty and sentenced him to 18 years in prison. In response to this sentence, he attempted to once again march with the miners toward Bucharest, but they were stopped by the security forces and Cozma was arrested.
