= Petre Roman =

Prime Minister of Romania between 1989 and 1991

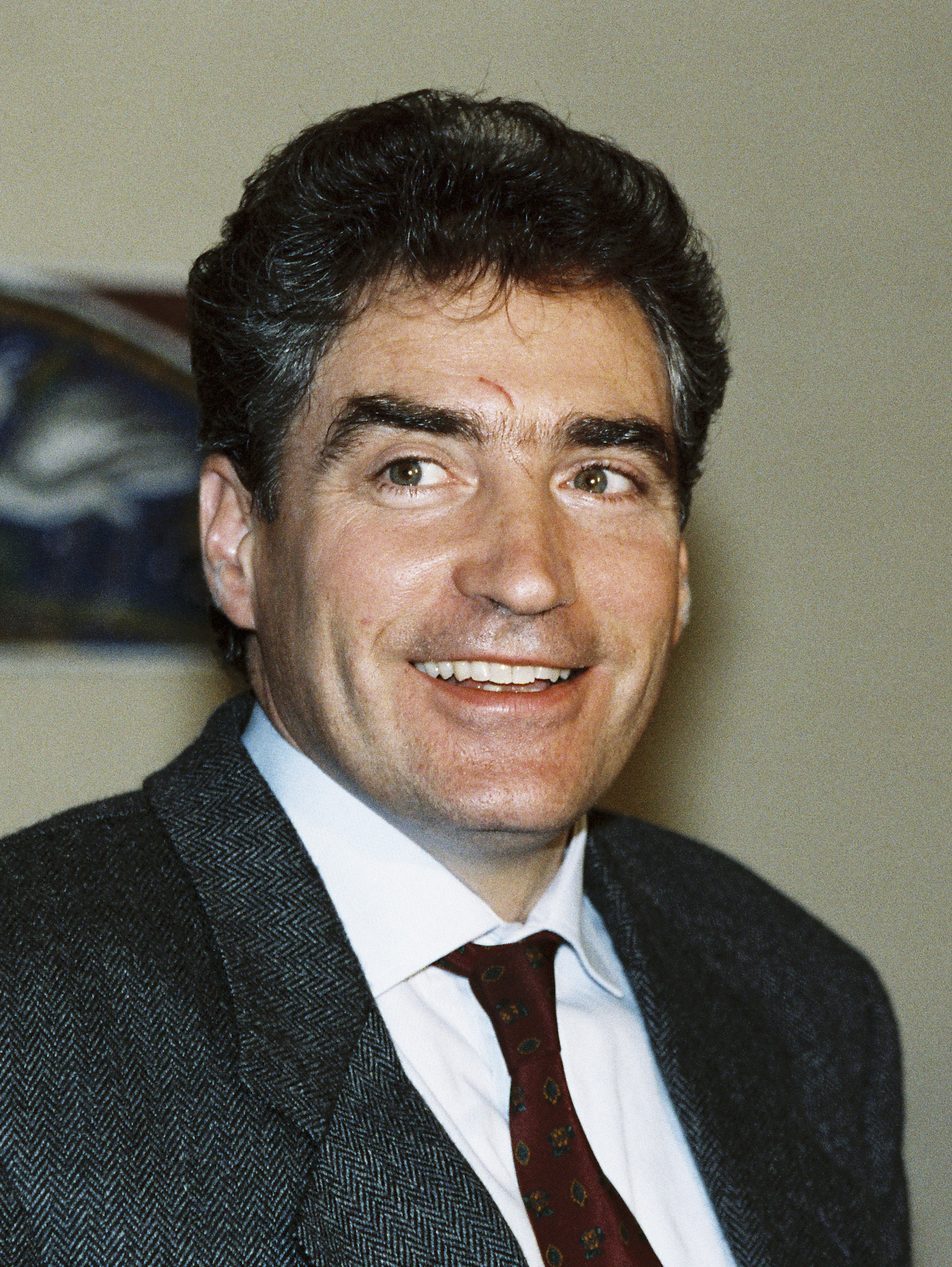
- Roman in the early 1990s

Prime Minister of Romania
- In office 26 December 1989 – 1 October 1991; Acting until 20 June 1990
- President: Ion Iliescu
- Preceded by: Constantin Dăscălescu
- Succeeded by: Theodor Stolojan

Member of the National Salvation Front Council
- In office 22 December 1989 – 26 December 1989

President of the Senate of Romania
- In office 27 November 1996 – 22 December 1999
- Preceded by: Oliviu Gherman
- Succeeded by: Mircea Ionescu Quintus

Minister of Foreign Affairs
- In office 22 December 1999 – 28 December 2000
- Prime Minister: Mugur Isărescu
- Preceded by: Andrei Pleșu
- Succeeded by: Mircea Geoană

Member of the Senate of Romania
- In office 22 November 1996 – 12 December 2004

Member of the Chamber of Deputies
- In office 9 June 1990 – 31 July 1990
- In office 6 October 1992 – 21 November 1996
- In office 19 December 2012 – 9 February 2015

Co-Founding Leader of the National Salvation Front
- In office 22 December 1989 – 28 May 1993 Serving with Ion Iliescu^{[a]} & Dumitru Mazilu^{[b]}
- Succeeded by: Himself (party renamed into the Democratic Party)

President of the Democratic Party
- In office 28 May 1993 – 19 May 2001
- Succeeded by: Traian Băsescu

President of the Democratic Force
- In office 2003–2008

Personal details
- Born: 22 July 1946 (age 80) Bucharest, Kingdom of Romania
- Party: Social Democratic Party (2020–present)
- Other political affiliations: Romanian Communist Party (before 1989); National Salvation Front (1989–1993); Democratic Party (1993–2003); Democratic Force (2003–2008); National Liberal Party (2008–2017?); Social Liberal Platform (2020)
- Spouses: Mioara Georgescu (m. 1974–2007) Silvia Chifiriuc (m. 2009)
- Education: Politehnica University of Bucharest; Paul Sabatier University
- Profession: Engineer
- Known for: Romanian Revolution
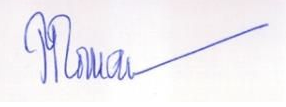
- Signature
- a. the party split on 7 April 1992: Ion Iliescu and his supporters formed the FDSN b. Mazilu resigned from the leadership of FSN on 26 January 1990

Petre Roman (Romanian pronunciation: [ˈpetre ˈroman]; born 22 July 1946) is a Romanian engineer and politician who was Prime Minister of Romania from 1989 to 1991, when his government was overthrown by the intervention of the miners led by Miron Cozma in the September 1991 Mineriad. Although regarded as the first Romanian prime minister since 1945 who was not a communist or communist sympathiser, he was a socialist. He later self-identified as a liberal. He was also the president of the Senate from 1996 to 1999 and Minister of Foreign Affairs from 1999 to 2000.

He was the leader of the Democratic Force (FD) party, which he founded after leaving the Democratic Party (PD) in 2003. He had previously served as an MP in the Lower Chamber, elected in 2012, elected as a member of the National Liberal Party. He had been removed from his seat in 2015 after being charged by the National Integrity Agency with incompatibility, but restored to office in 2016 after the Court of Appeals overturned the ruling. He is also a member of the Club of Madrid, a group of more than 80 democratic former statesmen, which works to strengthen democratic governance and leadership. In the early 2020 he joined Ilan Laufer's Social Liberal Platform, but he left it shortly afterwards. He joined the Social Democratic Party and was elected in the General Council of Bucharest in 2020, but he resigned shortly afterwards.

In 2022, Petre Roman emigrated to Switzerland, in order to become the president of the Swiss UMEF (university of applied sciences institute).

== Background ==
Petre Roman was born in Bucharest. His father, Valter Roman, born Ernst or Ernő Neuländer of Transylvanian Hungarian-Jewish descent, was a veteran of the Spanish Civil War, a Comintern activist, and a prominent member of the Romanian Communist Party (PCR). His mother, Hortensia Vallejo, was a Spaniard in exile who would become director of the Spanish section of Radio Romania International. The couple married in Moscow, and he has several siblings.

Roman attended the Petru Groza High School in his native city. He first rose to prominence during the Romanian Revolution of 1989, when he was among the crowd occupying the National Television building, and broadcasting messages expressing revolutionary triumph. He became provisional prime minister after the overthrow of the Communist regime, and was confirmed in office in June 1990, three months after the country's first free election in 53 years.

In 1974, Roman married Mioara Georgescu, with whom he has a daughter, Oana. In February 2007, husband and wife confirmed that they were divorcing; the divorce was made final on Good Friday, 6 April 2007. In June 2009, he married a pregnant Silvia Chifiriuc (who is 26 years his junior) in a Romanian Orthodox wedding.

== During the Romanian Revolution ==
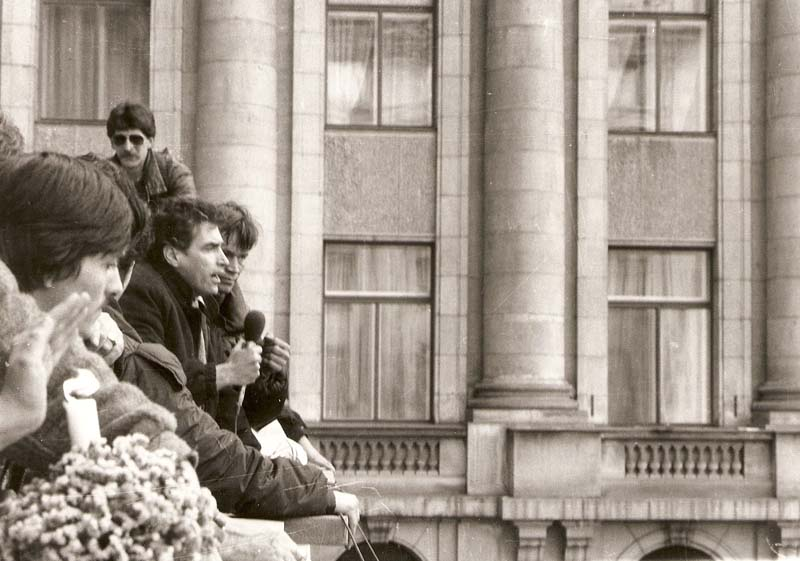
Petre Roman speaking to the crowd in Bucharest in late December 1989, during the Romanian Revolution

Petre Roman was heavily involved in the Romanian Revolution of December 1989 as a member of the National Salvation Front (FSN), both as a revolutionary and as a leading political figure. Given that the revolution was led by politicians united not by a cohesive ideology, but by resentment towards the Ceaușescu regime, infighting soon began, especially between its leaders, namely, centre-left liberal Dumitru Mazilu, who wished to instil capitalism, and neo-communist Ion Iliescu, who wanted to keep communism/hard line socialism, but remove Ceaușescu.

As a left-wing socialist, Petre Roman was largely the middle ground between the worldviews of his colleagues, as he wanted to replace the Marxist view of socialism as a transitory stage with a more democratic understanding of socialism.

=== Revolutionary activity ===
Petre Roman participated directly in the Romanian Revolution, forming a barricade in the centre of Bucharest from the days of 21 and 22 December. On 22 December 1989, Petre Roman spoke from the balcony of the headquarters of the Central Committee against the Ceaușescu regime, the first public demonstration of its kind.

On 22 December, he became a member of the Provisional Council of the National Salvation Front (CPFSN) established for the coordination of the revolutionary process and the establishment of democracy once the revolution had concluded.

=== Prime minister ===
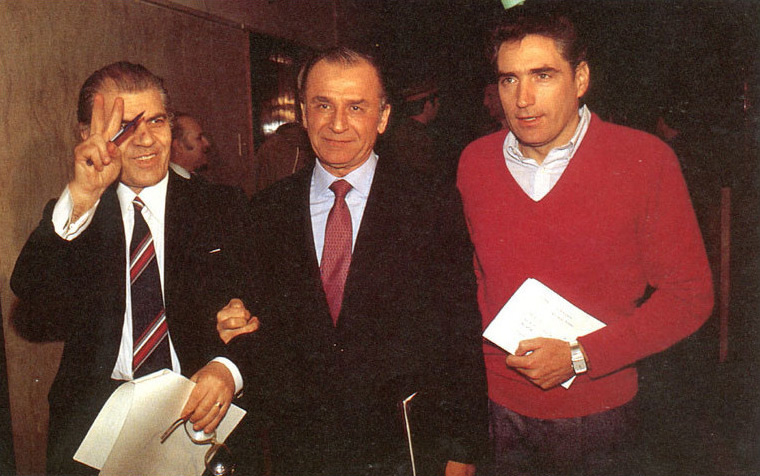
Roman (right) with FSN members Ion Iliescu (centre) and Dumitru Mazilu (left) on 23 December 1989, one day after the formation of the FSN

On 26 December 1989, Roman was appointed as the acting/ad interim Prime Minister of the provisional FSN government. At the 20 May 1990 elections–the first free elections held in the country in 53 years and colloquially known as the "Blindman's Sunday" (Romanian: Duminica orbului)–he was elected as a deputy from Bucharest on the FSN list.

Shortly afterwards, then president Iliescu designated him once more as prime minister on 20 June 1990. He was formally confirmed in office by the newly elected legislature of the parliament on 28 June 1990, and his governing program was subsequently approved unanimously. He was the head of government of three cabinets between 1989 and 1991, as follows: Roman I cabinet, Roman II cabinet, and Roman III cabinet. He was succeeded by Theodor Stolojan in October 1991, after the September 1991 Mineriad.

== Electoral history ==
=== Presidential elections ===
Election	Affiliation	First round			Second round		
Election	Affiliation	Votes	Percentage	Position	Votes	Percentage	Position
1996	USD	2,598,545	20.53%	3rd	not qualified		
2000	PD	334,852	2.98%	6th	not qualified		
2004	FD	140,702	1.34%	7th	not qualified		

== See also ==
- Péter Magyar, Hungarian prime minister whose family name also represents the country he served in

Political offices
Preceded by Constantin Dăscălescu	Prime Minister of Romania; Acting: 1989–1990; 1989–1991	Succeeded by Theodor Stolojan
