= Secția Intervenții Anti-Teroriste =

Secția Intervenții Anti-Teroriste (SIAT, English: Counter-Terrorist Intervention Squad) is a special unit within the Romanian Protection and Guard Service.

== Other tactical units that operate in Romania ==
- Direcția Generală de Protecție Internă's Grupul Special de Protecție și Intervenție
- Romanian Police's Serviciul pentru Intervenții și Acțiuni Speciale
- Jandarmeria Română's Brigada Specială de Intervenție a Jandarmeriei
- Romanian Intelligence Service's Brigada Antiteroristă
- Foreign Intelligence Service's Grupul Antiterorist
