= Gelu Voican Voiculescu =

Deputy prime minister of Romania (born 1941)

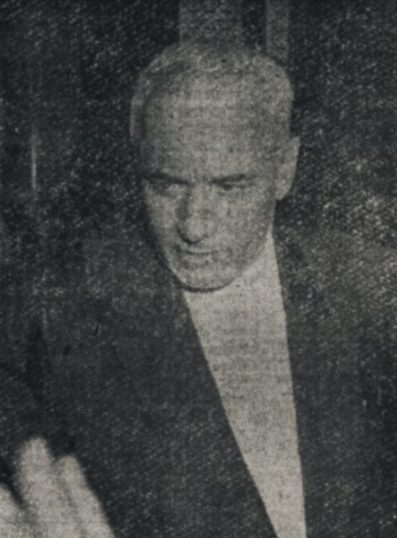
- Voican Voiculescu upon being sworn in as Senator, 20 June 1990

Deputy Prime Minister of Romania
- In office 28 December 1989 – June 1990

Romanian Head of National Security
- In office 31 December 1989 – 26 March 1990
- Preceded by: Iulian Vlad (as head of the Securitate)
- Succeeded by: Virgil Măgureanu (as head of the SRI)

Senator of Romania
- In office 18 June 1990 – 19 March 1992
- Constituency: Buzău County

Ambassador of Romania in Tunisia
- In office March 1992 – 19 November 1996

Ambassador of Romania in Morocco
- In office 1 March 2001 – January 2005

Personal details
- Born: Grigore Voiculescu; 8 February 1941 (age 85) Bucharest, Kingdom of Romania
- Party: Independent (1989–1997; FSN-aligned 1989–1991); PDSR/PSD (since 1997)
- Spouse(s): Sanda Voicu (m. 1979; div. 1989) Ana Carmen Pahomi (died 2018) Georgiana Arsene (m. 2019)
- Children: 4
- Relatives: Octavian Codru Tăslăuanu (grandfather); Michel Sturdza (uncle); Ștefan Fay (uncle)
- Education: University of Bucharest
- Profession: Geologist, engineer, visual artist, writer, editor, activist

Gelu Voican Grigoriță Voiculescu (Romanian pronunciation: [ˈdʒelu vo.iˈkan vo.ikuˈlesku]; born Grigore Voiculescu on 8 February 1941) is a Romanian politician, diplomat, visual artist and esotericist, who achieved national recognition during the anti-communist revolution of 1989. A scion of the boyar aristocracy, he was persecuted during the early stages of the communist regime, which objected to his "reactionary" views, his modernist paintings, and his likely participation in the 1956 students' movement. He was made to interrupt his studies and sent to work as a welder, but finally accepted at the University of Bucharest, where he obtained certification as a geological engineer. In the late 1960s, upon the start of Nicolae Ceaușescu's communist rule, he was also allowed to exhibit his drawings. However, the regime came to suspect or (according to Voiculescu) frame him as a spy; in these circumstances, Voiculescu crossed into the Hungarian People's Republic, attempting to defect into Austria. Captured and handed to the Romanian Securitate, he was unusually released from custody—prompting enduring speculation that the Securitate recruited him as its informant or agent. This reading was partly confirmed by Securitate personnel and post-revolutionary authorities, but consistently denied by Voiculescu himself.

During the 1970s, Voiculescu associated himself with the Onirist circle of writers and frequented known dissidents such as Paul Goma, but was generally regarded with suspicion due to his perceived Securitate associations. His interest in esoterica, from astrology to perennialism, came to be widely seen as odd (and was resented by the Securitate), though his biography of René Guénon earned respect among scholars. He was employed at a mining institute, which put him in contact with the workers of various basins, including the Jiu Valley; he was forced out of such areas by the communist authorities, who saw him as involved in the 1977 miners' strike. In 1985, he was rearrested and then sentenced as a common criminal, on charges that were likely invented by the Securitate. Ultimately amnestied and allowed to resume his work, he entered the fray during the revolutionary events.

Voiculescu claimed to have been engaged in these as an ordinary protester, then propelled into the public eye when he survived murderous repression by the Miliția and the socialist army; however, his account was brought into question by those who noted his close associations with Securitate officers throughout the events he described, and his defense of the Securitate as a patriotic institution, to which he clung throughout his subsequent political career. He appeared at Ceaușescu's trial and masterminded his quick execution, for which he always took remorseless pride. The National Salvation Front, presided upon by Ion Iliescu, made him Deputy Prime Minister in the first post-communist cabinet. Iliescu also assigned him to lead its provisional intelligence-gathering structures, including the UM 0215; he was criticized for using this position to assume non-transparent control over the Securitate's assets. During his tenure, he began a lasting feud with the opposition Christian Democratic National Peasants' Party and the Greek Catholic Church, while also handling pacification during the ethnic clashes of Târgu Mureș—emerging from these as a noted critic of Romanian nationalism.

Voiculescu stepped down from national security in March 1990, upon the creation of a centralized Romanian Intelligence Service—which he later came to view as an incompetent institution. Taking a seat in the Senate following the elections of May, he acquired fame for his strongly worded critique of the anti-Front Golaniad protesters, and was widely identified as a responsible for the June Mineriad, which saw coal miners raiding Bucharest. For a while after, Voiculescu remained especially close to the country's Premier, Petre Roman, at a time when the latter was clashing with nationalist and far-left groups. The Mineriad of September 1991, which severely weakened Roman's cabinet, was presented by Voiculescu as a vast conspiracy involving both the moribund Soviet Union and the Iron Guard. He then reconciled with President Iliescu, who made him ambassador to Tunisia (where Voiculescu helped improve Palestine–Romania relations). He was recalled upon the change of governments in 1996, joining Iliescu's Social Democrats; his diplomatic career was resumed after elections in 2000, when he was ambassador to Morocco (recalled in 2005, after another election). Voiculescu spent the next twenty years engaged in various legal battles, including his ongoing prosecution for crimes against humanity. He is also a vocal critic of Atlanticism and globalism, having restated his own nationalism during the NATO bombing of Yugoslavia.

== Early life ==
The future politician was born in Bucharest on 8 February 1941, as the son of Dafina Tăslăuanu and geologist Ștefan "Esteban" Voiculescu-Dioști. While his father had peasant origins in rural Oltenia, Dafina's ancestors were members of the social and political elite. His maternal grandfather was Octavian Codru Tăslăuanu, a publisher, political thinker, and activist of the Romanian National Party in Austria-Hungary. Also on his mother's side, he is related by blood to the prestigious Sturdza family. His ancestors on that line include a sister of the Moldavian statesman Costache Negri; Gelu's maternal uncles were Michel Sturdza, who had recently served as Minister of Foreign Affairs, and, through marriage, the part-Hungarian writer-genealogist Ștefan Fay. Additionally, Voiculescu is recognized as a relative by the Cantacuzino family, and as such has claimed direct descent from Vlad the Impaler.

Michel and several other Sturdzas were deeply embedded with the fascist Iron Guard, which had formed the "National Legionary State" of 1940–1941. The boy was reportedly born prematurely as a result of the Guardist rebellion and downfall, which had caused Dafina great distress; during the clampdown ordered by Ion Antonescu, Michel fled to Nazi Germany, while his son Ilie-Vlad was imprisoned. Raised into Orthodoxy, Gelu was originally baptized as "Grigore". By 1942, he was recorded in Universul newspaper as "Gelu Voican Grigoriță Voiculescu". He explained the name "Voican" as originating with his father's preferred, but unofficial, surname (and ultimately as the given name of a paternal ancestor). During primary school, Gelu was registered with "Voican" as a surname, until Ștefan was informed that they needed to comply with existing name laws.

Voiculescu's childhood witnessed the anti-Nazi coup of 1944, which his uncle Michel tried to defeat with Nazi support, followed closely by the onset of a Soviet occupation, which the Voiculescus deeply resented. The leftward shift was cemented by the 1948 disestablishment of the Romanian Kingdom, with a communist regime being introduced as its replacement. During the subsequent backlash, Dafina hid her Fay relatives, and various other persecuted figures, in the Voiculescu family home. According to Voiculescu's own recollections, both his mother and grandmother were themselves pushed into hiding "at the height of Stalinist persecution". Before and after this episode, they taught him to idolize the anti-communist guerrillas (such as Gheorghe Arsenescu, Leon Șușman, and Ion Uță), and he considered joining their ranks.

Young Gelu, who was taught French as his second mother tongue, graduated from Bucharest's I. L. Caragiale High School in 1957, then began studying towards an engineering degree at the Petroleum Research Institute (ICP). During his second year there, he was purged as a "reactionary" with "unhealthy social origins" and "contacts with foreign reactionaries". At a larger level, this clampdown corresponded to fears caused by the Hungarian Revolution of 1956 and the corresponding movement in Bucharest. The authorities, who subjected him to criticism sessions that he found to be especially terrifying, also noted his "modernist" paintings and his constantly wearing a cross necklace.

== First arrest ==
Voiculescu spent another year as a welder for the Bucharest Drilling Enterprise, describing his time there as a humiliating ordeal. He was ultimately allowed to reenlist at the University of Bucharest Faculty of Geology, where he was colleagues with a future political adversary, Emil Constantinescu. Voiculescu graduated in 1963 as a geological engineer. The same year, he completed his mandatory service in the socialist army, emerging as a sub-officer and preserving a lifelong interest in military uniforms. He worked for the petrochemical industry, prospecting at Videle, and was later allowed to join the research staff at the ICP. Returning to drawing, in May 1968 he exhibited as an amateur artist at the Trade Unions' Council in Sector 2. His portraits and abstract compositions were welcomed as refreshing and cerebral by Al. Cerbu of Gazeta Literară, though he noted that some of them were too experimental to count as viable.

After Nicolae Ceaușescu had taken over as general secretary of the Romanian Communist Party (PCR), Voiculescu's politics continued to clash with the regime's agenda—as noted in 2019 by historian Marius Oprea, "he may be regarded as a dissident of sorts." He also refused PCR membership when it was offered to him, even though it would have advanced his career. In 1965, the Securitate agency, which monitored acts of disobedience, opened a permanent file on him. He was taken in for interrogation in early 1969, after a student demonstration that had taken place on the preceding Christmas Day. He was eventually arrested in 1970. During the search that followed, Voiculescu was found to be carrying the template of a drilling rig, resulting in his prosecution for the crime of treason, which was added to the charge of sedition (or "dangerous agitation"). In one other account, Voiculescu mentions that he and his father, "the representative of a foreign company", were being framed for industrial espionage, that the rig design was innocuous, and that he only decided to flee upon realizing that he was being set up.

Gheorghe Goran, who acted as the Securitate chief in Oradea and personally escorted Voiculescu back to Bucharest, reports that the latter had used his Jewish contacts for crossing into the Hungarian People's Republic. Voiculescu was apprehended by Hungarian border guards at the Austrian border, and spent three months in a Hungarian prison, where, by his own account, he received fair treatment. He was afterwards sent into Securitate custody. He was never sentenced, but allowed to walk free after another three-months detainment—as noted by Oprea, this "struck those in his proximity as rather suspicious, and perhaps rightly so." Voiculescu himself explains that Goran, who handled his interrogation, wrote off the accusations against him, finding him to be innocent of the charges. A civilian prosecutor was brought in, but dropped the remaining charges. Goran contends that, after the 1970 arrest, the geologist remained "in contact" with Securitate personnel, including Goran's own subordinate, Viorel Tache, who was later "attached" to Voiculescu.

Upon his release in late 1970, Voiculescu, assisted by some of his friends, became a proofreader at a literary review, Viața Românească. He also began frequenting writers—possibly only as a friendly reader, since he himself did not write professionally. Voiculescu nonetheless had a steady correspondence with the artist and translator Tașcu Gheorghiu, who had preceded him as proofreader. The letters they exchanged were samples of surreal humor, meant to perplex future readers—Voiculescu referred to himself as Gelu Zadarnicu ("Fruitless Gelu"), and to Gheorghiu as a "Rosicrucian". He was also passionate about the perennialist scholar René Guénon, and, as a result, contacted Guénonian disciple Vasile Lovinescu. His other focus was on the 16th-century oracle Nostradamus, whom he approached through a Romanian exegete, Vlaicu Ionescu. Inspired by Guénon, Voiculescu was then curious about Islamic philosophy, and, as Paleologu reports, became a "great admirer" of Ruhollah Khomeini. In a 2000s interview with Claudio Mutti, Voican acknowledges that he once regarded Khomeini as a "holy man", and also that he had welcomed Khomeinism within the Iranian Revolution as a traditional restoration.

== IPROMIN and rearrest ==
For a while, Voiculescu, who owned some 1,200 books in 1985, was seen at a modernist circle formed by in Bucharest by the Jewish physician Endre Herskovits. Here, he met authors Vintilă Ivănceanu and Dumitru Țepeneag, and painters such as Horia Bernea. According to diplomat and literary critic Alexandru Paleologu, Voiculescu was an actual member of Țepeneag's Onirist group of writers, though Țepeneag himself dismisses him as Ivănceanu's țuțăr ("sycophant"). Another author, Dorin Tudoran, encountered Voiculescu during vacations within a larger group of intellectuals, but could not clearly remember whether these were at 2 Mai or on Miron Radu Paraschivescu's property at Vălenii de Munte. The engineer's other new acquaintances were Paul Goma, Eugen Barbu, and Adrian Păunescu. As Voiculescu reports, the latter "believed I was a Securitate asset, since I was frequenting literary gatherings without publishing a thing". Goma also contends that Voiculescu was always a people-pleaser, and that his prison term (which he mistakenly dates to 1976) turned him into an informant.

In 1973, Voiculescu left his position at Viața Românească, which went to poet Petre Got, and was allowed to work at IPROMIN, the country's leading designer of mining equipment. Though this institution was broken up within a year, he remained attached to a surviving section, which did design work for various state companies from the provinces. As such, he did prospecting work on the Roșia Poieni copper mine, and was frequently present at coal mines along the Jiu Valley. Under contract with Editura Minerva, he curated an edition of memoirs by his Tăslăuanu grandfather, printed in 1976. His father died in October 1975. In the early 2000s, journalists speculated about a youthful amorous relationship between him and his IPROMIN colleague, Lia Sandu (Roberts), who had since emigrated to the United States and embarked on a political career of her own. Voiculescu rejected this account, insisting that he did not know her.

In 1979, Voiculescu married Sanda Voicu, whose brother was a Securitate cadre. Goma remembered that Voiculescu had been married twice by 1976, and that he and his second wife, whom he does not name, once visited him in Drumul Taberei. This was in mid-1977, at a time when Goma was going public with a letter of protest against Ceaușescu, asking people to sign it. Though Voiculescu later depicted himself as a participant in the movement, Goma denied him the merit, noting that both Voiculescus had "left without saying anything." Securitate files show that Gelu was arrested in August 1977, suspected of having assisted Goma, and also of having been involved in the coal miners' strike. Voiculescu, who admitted visiting the strikers to "see for himself", was set free for lack of evidence, but was banned from reentering the Jiu Valley.

By the early 1980s, Voiculescu was again engaging in public acts of disobedience, frequenting dissident George Gugea and talking to journalists at ANSA; following a workers' strike in Gorj County, he was barred from entering northern Oltenia. He was arrested by the Securitate's Colonel Condroiu in mid-1985, then prosecuted for his "propaganda against the social order". Though this charge was dropped, he was tried and convicted to one and a half years in jail for a common-law crime (falsifying his travel orders). Voiculescu has described his charge as a trumped-up one, invented by Securitate in an effort to discredit him; several commentators agree with him on this point. He pleaded guilty, and accepted a one-and-a-half years term in prison. He was thus spared the more serious, political charge, which carried up to 7 years in jail.

Voiculescu further argues that the original charge, of standing against the "social order", referred to his known interest in esotericism, astrology, and secret societies lore. He was ultimately held at Rahova Prison, on the outskirts of Bucharest, in a "special section" run by the Securitate, without visiting rights. This moment pointed to additional controversy: Oprea speculates that the Securitate likely recruited him at this stage, to serve as Tache's undercover agent. Voiculescu was in any case amnestied before completing his sentence. He began writing an intellectual biography of Guénon, completed by 1987. In tandem, he closely studied Guénon's Principes du calcul infinitésimal, which he credits with having given him.insight into mathematical analysis and differential calculus; he managed to have some fragments of his mentor's essays published in Viața Românească's almanac, but without Guénon being credited by name. In 1988–1989, the Securitate performed several searches at his domicile, confiscating some 160 of his books, which dealt in philosophy and Indian religions. Voiculescu divorced Sanda in February 1989, but they remained friends. He lived alone near Grădina Icoanei, until eventually remarrying Ana Carmen Pahomi, a children's writer and aspiring novelist, who was 18 years his junior. Gelu had two children from her by 1991.

== Revolutionary events ==
Just ahead of the 1989 revolutions, Voiculescu was losing hope that the Eastern bloc would ever be dismantled, and saw communism as a bad idea that would neverthless spread worldwide. He believed that the "so-called capitalistic" Western bloc would fuel communism with exports of grain. However, in December 1989 he became deeply involved in the Romanian revolution. He was informed of the initial outbreak and resulting massacre of Timișoara, but later came to regard it as either staged by forces waiting to take power or intentional overkill by the socialist army, who, in his view, was working to frame Ceaușescu. A participant in the repression later claimed that Voiculescu was also present, and armed, at Timișoara, though Voiculescu himself denied this, stating that he was on a work assignment in Baia Mare as the revolt had started. Voiculescu also cites Securitate documents purportedly showing that he was due for another arrest. By his own account, he only joined the protest movement in its Bucharest phase: he left his workplace on the evening of 21 December, intending to join the Palace-Square rally, which had turned into an anti-Ceaușescu demonstration. In doing so, he evaded a stakeout by the Miliția troops under Major Fediuc, whom he had first met at Rahova (and who allegedly rounded up and mistreated other would-be protesters). Upon arriving on the square, he faced the Miliția in its riot gear. He then joined some dozens of men and women (the "Grădiniţa Group") in refusing to leave the premises after the crowds had been dispersed. Voiculescu walked to a new rally in Piața Romană, then to his home. He then contacted Securitate colonels Harosa and Cruceru, who accompanied him to the InterContinental, where revolutionaries had engaged the Miliția and the army in a stand-off; it was here that Voiculescu met the emerging politician Petre Roman, introduced to him as "communist Valter Roman's son".

According to Oprea, Voiculescu was always vague about his exact whereabouts and the side he picked during the massacre of 21–22 December, only agreeing to clarify that he himself did not have a weapon; Oprea believes that this clarification relies on plausible deniability, since the only sources who could claim to refute it were themselves on the shooting side. On 22 December, the revolutionaries, now allied with the army, were in the process of obtaining control over government structures, and also arming themselves. Voiculescu was among those who were granted a pistol by the Ministry of National Defense, and had it on him as he moved to seize control of the TVR Tower, where the crowds had come under fire from mysterious "terrorists". Here, he and Sergiu Nicolaescu took hold of soldiers' weapons, and shot in the general direction of Pangratti Studios; Voiculescu attested that: "From Dorobanți, Sergiu had shot down one of those standing on the roof, but the dead body has vanished".

Voiculescu was directly involved in settling the apparent power vacuum created by Ceaușescu's hasty departure, once describing his role as "sublime and involuntary imposture" within a "conspiracy of fate". Goma, who watched him on national television from his exile in France, found his story "charmingly naive, like a folk tale", and more readily believed that he had been planted at the forefront as a covert "soldier". Voiculescu's continued presence in such broadcasts was one of the main reasons convincing Goma that he should not seek a return to Romania; with time, he consolidated his wholly negative perception of Voiculescu, referring to him as a "criminal" and a "dangerous scallywag" (un terchea-berchea periculos).

While doing his live broadcasts, Voiculescu was introduced to Ion Iliescu, leader of the PCR's reformist wing, whom he understood as Ceaușescu's most credible replacement. He claims that the street had advanced Nicolaescu and Ion Caramitru as its prime candidates for the President of Romania; he also recounted (without directly witnessing) an attempt by the PCR's Ilie Verdeț to organize a transition cabinet. He helped the competing sides coalesce under Iliescu, who organized the catch-all National Salvation Front (FSN)—he and Mihai Ispas reportedly helped separate Iliescu from the PCR group that had brought him over to the Central Committee Building, and had then helped boost his popularity by deferring decisions to him.

During a televised polemic in 2006, Iliescu recalled that he and other FSN leaders had come under fire from "terrorists", and that, on Voiculescu's suggestion, they "reclined on the floor". For his part, Voiculescu always took objection to claims that Iliescu was being used by the Soviet Union. Though he acknowledged Soviet influence as overwhelming, and as pushing for "a war between the army and Securitate", he associated it with Verdeț and Bujor Sion. In his view, Iliescu was never a "Russophile"; he merely placated Mikhail Gorbachev in order to gain control of the situation, before turning against him. Voiculescu, who believes that the FSN was always "incompatible with communism", also argues that claims of Soviet interference were helped along by a taped phone call, namely one between the FSN and Ferenc Kárpáti, the Hungarian Minister of Defense. Held in Russian, it was immediately misrepresented by the press as a demand for direct Soviet intervention.

== At Ceaușescu's trial ==
Voiculescu reportedly sat by Iliescu's side throughout those days, only leaving on 25 December to take part in Ceaușescu's trial and sentencing at Tîrgoviște. Officially, he had been called up by the army's judicial aide, Mugurel Florescu, to serve as one of the "assistant witnesses". The military judge was Colonel (later General) Gică Popa, who decided for the death sentence. Popa later took his own life, allegedly because he hoped that his own death would persuade Ceaușescu loyalists not to go after his family. One member of Popa's circle suggest that Voiculescu knew about this danger, but did nothing to protect the Popas. The general's sister additionally claimed that Voiculescu had been directly involved in pressuring the judge by carrying a pistol into the improvised courtroom.

At Tîrgoviște, Voiculescu was always accompanied by Cerasela Bîrjac Demetrescu—whom he presented as a fellow revolutionary, but who, Florescu reports, was also a former Miliția operative. Voiculescu has laughed off "legends" that he was ever armed while on camera, but does not fully reject other claims regarding his decisive role in the trial. As early as April 1990, in a TF1 interview, he spoke of his being the first and only person in the room to have supported execution from the start. He once declared that Ceaușescu and his wife Elena had brought it upon themselves, and that any delay to their killing would have sent Romanians into a panic. Voiculescu also believed that, as the only person in the room who did not have a clear-cut position in the legal proceedings, he unwittingly gave Ceaușescu an "absurd hope", that he was there to rescue him and his wife at the last moment. He claims to have seen undisclosed footage of the Ceaușescu couple being "beaten up and tortured" before facing their executioners, but acknowledges that this still did not make him sympathize with them. He repeatedly recounted that Nicolae's body had kept a "rosy color" and relative warmth for three days after execution. This was confirmed by Florescu. He recalls that Bîrjac was shocked by the unexplained phenomenon.

Voiculescu and Bîrjac found Elena's gold jewelry, which they kept as a trophy in his ministerial office. Voiculescu also kept footage of the execution, and later presented it to the press. His tape fuelled conspiracy theories by showing Elena as relatively intact, against statements by her execution squad, who had reported that some 30 bullets had gone into her head. It also shows him orchestrating the Ceaușescus' initial burial, held without a religious service, in lieu of which he recited the idiomatic phrase: "May the ground be light to you". The burial was done in secrecy at Ghencea Cemetery, where the two bodies were separated, with false names written on the crosses. Voiculescu explained that the new authorities wanted to prevent vigilantes from digging up the place and desecrating the bodies. During a later interview taped in his apartment, he appeared alongside braids of garlic. The images were discussed by anthropologists as possibly indicating his fear of revenants, or strigoi.

In January 1996, Voiculescu issued a statement assuring Romanians that the execution had offered Ceaușescu "a dramatic end, not without its tragic grandeur", always preferable to "an old age entrapped by some prison". He repeated such claims in a later interview with historian Florin Constantiniu, who noted his "near-complete lack of inhibitions" in revisiting the case. As part of the exchange, Voiculescu took credit for the couple's "suppression", and noted that he had had to persuade Iliescu of this being the best possible solution. However, he once admitted that he was moved by Nicolae's tenderness toward his wife, manifested "even as they were facing the firing squad." In 2010, he complained of continouous harassment from those who did not believe that the Ghencea graves housed the real Ceaușescus.

== Gaining power ==
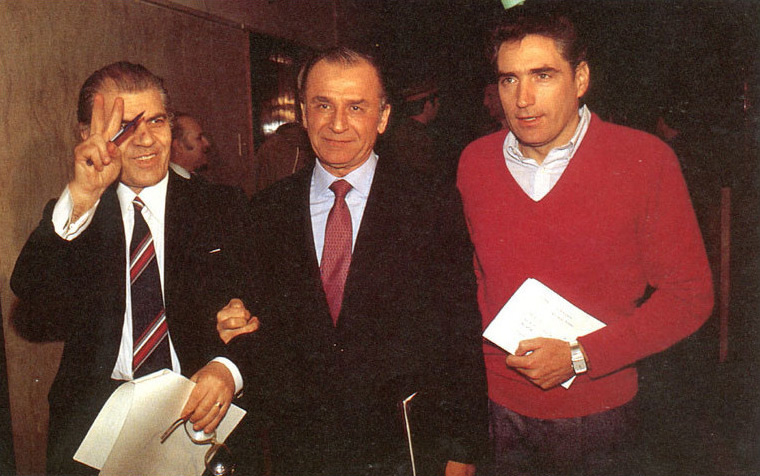
The first triumvirate of the National Salvation Front on 23 December 1989. Left to right: Dumitru Mazilu, Ion Iliescu, and Petre Roman

On the evening of 28 December 1989, Iliescu, as acting head of state (President of the FSN Council), named Voiculescu as one of two Deputy Prime Ministers, seconding Prime Minister Roman. His first appearance in that capacity was at the 29 December funeral of General Vasile Milea, where he and Dumitru Mazilu represented the FSN. His area of expertise and control included the entire mining industry. He ran this department alongside a close friend, the Hungarian Romanian István Király of Baia Mare, whom he called in as his advisor, and for whom he began learning Hungarian. Voiculescu was also officially tasked with collecting on the debt owed to Romania by the Arab world, and was thus dispatched on a visit to Egypt, being received by Hosni Mubarak on 28 January 1990. Economist Alexandru D. Albu reports that the mission, which included Roman's Arabist wife Mioara among the regular lobbyists, managed to recover some 250 million United States dollars in merchandise. While Albu praises Voiculescu for his success, he also claims that there was a suspicious "discount" from the 300 million that Egypt had originally owed. According to various other reports, Voiculescu also either crossed briefly into the Libyan Jamahiriya or met with Libyan envoys in Cairo.

At home, Voiculescu was nearly always present at sessions of the Romanian Synod; he was in communication with the Orthodox Patriarch, Teoctist Arăpașu, whose reputation had been tainted by PCR associations, and giving him assurance of Iliescu's protection. Voiculescu was then involved in the conflict opposing the Orthodox and Greek Catholic churches. As a bishop of the latter, Alexandru Todea accused Voiculescu of unfairly promoting the Orthodox agenda. In tandem, the emerging Iliescu regime proceeded to arrested the Securitate's last director, Iulian Vlad. Voiculescu, who was allegedly involved in Vlad's downfall, was consequently in charge of organizing the secret service. He was appointed as head of National Security on 31 December, one day after the Securitate had been formally outlawed, and was nominally subordinate to the Ministry of Defense. In addition to gaining custody over the Securitate archives, he devised a controversial, and ultimately defeated, plan to preserve the Securitate structures under a new name—Siguranța Poporului, "People's Safety". Oprea believed that this initiative was especially incriminating, since Voiculescu had nominated Goran as the agency's chief; he had actually been successful in making Condroiu, his supposed persecutor, a head officer at the UM 0215—a new espionage unit where Harosa also held a prominent position.

In later years, Voiculescu became noted for describing a "fruitful collaboration" that had existed between Securitate cadres and the new structures, also justifying the temporary detainment of Mazilu, the more radically anti-communist figure on the FSN's right, as a valid security measure. He defended the UM 0215 as a bulwark against Soviet infiltration, and as staffed by "the Securitate's elite officers", using their talents to compile a list of suspected KGB agents within the PCR nomenklatura. Additionally, he theorized that the Securitate had been framed by the de-communized Land Forces, with army leader Victor Stănculescu creating "terrorists" as a false-flag operation. In his reading, Stănculescu maintained control of the power structures while he purged out the Securitate, while pressuring Iliescu into compliance; he also identified Stănculescu as personally responsible for all victims, including those who had been attributed to Ceaușescu personally. However, Voiculescu also filmed himself and his troops hunting down terrorist cells. In one instance, they reportedly detained cadets of the police academy, presenting them as Ceaușescu loyalists.

In a 1990 piece, political scientist Dan Pavel referred to Voiculescu as "popular and mysterious". His eccentricities and esoteric interests were by then the subject of public scrutiny. Newspaper founder Ion Cristoiu was a noted critic, who alleged that Voiculescu, the "strangest" and "most dangerous" FSN cadre, had felt emboldened by Roman's rapid rise from an insignificant position to national leadership, deciding to use the same template for himself. A paper published in 2004, supposedly showing Roman intervening to have Voiculescu initiated by the Freemasonry, was dismissed as a forgery by Roman himself. As late as 2017, businessman Lucian Cornescu-Ring, who had since established Romania's Grand Masonic Lodge, was advertising his close relationships with Roman and Voiculescu—but without claiming them as affiliates.

Journalist Pál Bodor, who met Voiculescu for an interview in January 1990, was intrigued by the "white-bearded, forty-something giant", a "geologist who came out of nowhere" and lived at his office in Victoria Palace. Upon greeting Bodor, Voiculescu carried "the most modern machine gun around his neck, [and] a wide Maramureș peasant leather belt around his waist, with (as I later learned) a gun in it"; his staff still the included the "strikingly beautiful" Cerasela. Also then, Voiculescu was reunited with Vintilă Ivănceanu, who had returned from exile. Ivănceanu was surprised and amused by the martial attire of his "Onirist admirer". When Voiculescu offered to grant him any favor, the writer jokingly asked him for an armored vehicle.

== February riot and Târgu Mureș clashes ==
A major political battle came in late January 1990, when the FSN decided to register as a political party and run its own list of candidates in the May elections—thereby positioning itself as a favorite, against the numerically weaker Christian Democratic National Peasants' Party (PNȚCD). The decision had followed weeks of reassurances from Iliescu, Roman, and sometimes Voiculescu, that such politicization was not on the table. Voiculescu nevertheless did not join the party, defining himself as an independent supporter of its policies. In February, he was sent to deal with protesting soldiers from the Timișoara garrison, who were demanding institutional reforms and an inquiry into Nicolae Militaru's appointment as Defense Minister. According to journalist Gabriela Negreanu, his very presence there showed that Iliescu and Roman did not take the protest seriously. Voiculescu, who "has no executive powers", used convoluted phrases and a "purely stylistic logic" to placate the soldiers.

On 18 February, anti-FSN protesters stormed into Victoria Palace, entering Voiculescu's offices and allegedly injuring his guards. By his own account, he managed to talk some of them into non-violent solutions, "which practically saved my life". He spoke of the assailants as belonging to "pressure groups [that] seek to undo the social balance"; the protesters available for questioning identified as independents who resented Roman's string of economic reforms, while the guards claimed that the more violent ones were PNȚCD cadres. Nicolae Manolescu, of the anti-FSN Civic Alliance, was intrigued that Voiculescu's interview was aired on national television, within a succession of images that seemed to depict most protesters as violent. According to Manolescu, most of the 4,000 protesters had been entirely peaceful, suggesting to him that the violence was staged by the FSN. Political scientist Gabriel Andreescu, who was in the crowd, likewise credits the inside-job theory, and sees the UM 0215 as involved. He reports that the break-in was done by "a tiny, shifty character", who then appeared to exchange greetings with a Police colonel. Voiculescu rejects claims that he himself had steered the crowds, and renewed accounts that he was armed, seeing them as "absurd" and "irresponsible".

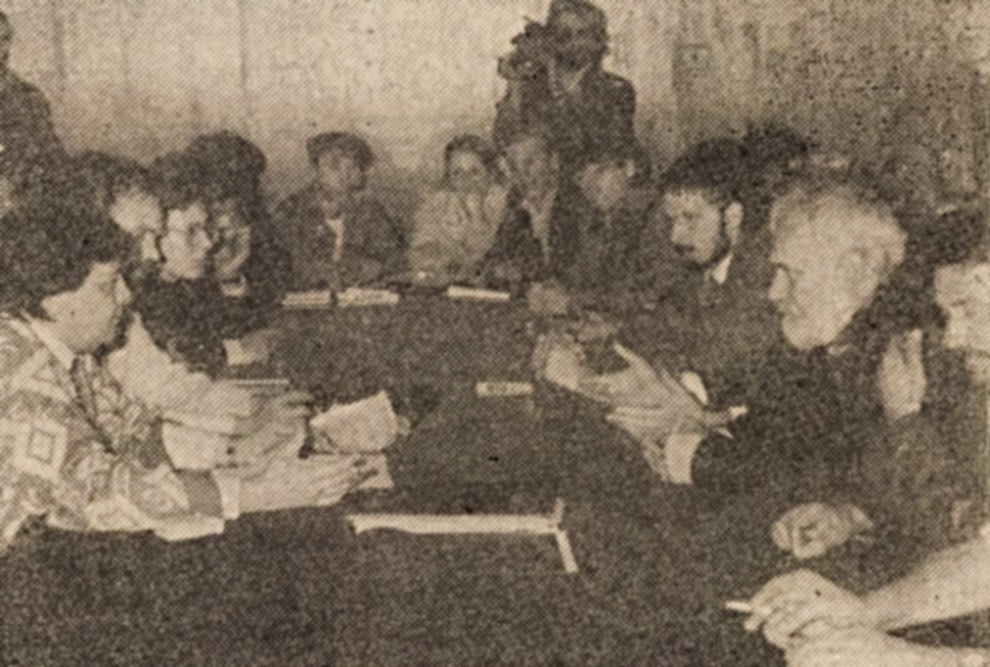
Voiculescu (second from the right) with Hungarian and Romanian students in Târgu Mureș, during the aftermath of ethnic clashes in that city

On 21 February 1990, Voiculescu helped negotiate a deal between government and the striking personnel of the Bucharest Metro. Shortly after, the social conflicts were aggravated by a series of ethnic riots in Târgu Mureș, a city of Hungarian concentration. On 20 March, the new governing body, or Provisional Council of National Unity (CPUN), appointed Voiculescu on the investigative commission, which was supposed to present a detailed report on these events. He traveled to that area on 23 March, immediately overseeing a purge of the CPUN offices in Mureș County—in his speech, he urged delegates to vote in "energetic, authoritative persons", capable of preventing more violence. His probe produced evidence that local Romanian nationalists, organized as the Romanian Hearth Union, were receiving encouragement and stipends from self-exiled members of the Iron Guard. His other focus, that of encouraging negotiations between the two sides, was met with resistance by some local Romanians, whose protest was only non-violent because of a large paratrooper presence.

On 26 March 1990, Voiculescu lost control over security forces, which Iliescu organized as the Romanian Intelligence Service (SRI), with sociologist Virgil Măgureanu as its inaugural director. At the time, he was preparing instead for the elections. According to an IRSOP poll, he entered the race as the fifth most trusted person in Romania. Historian Doina Pașca Harsanyi argues that his reputation was boosted by the state-owned television, as when the cameras were turned on while a lady from the crowd rushed in to thank him for his work, and by his biography being kept a virtual secret from the general public. On the opening day of electioneering, he and other FSN leaders appeared at a commemoration for the revolution victims, performing Christian rites. This ceremony was also transmitted live by state TV, now seen in opposition circles as a FSN propaganda tool.

== "Clitoris" quote and Golaniad clampdown ==
In tandem, the FSN had to tackle a massive sit-in protest in Bucharest, called "Golaniad". Voiculescu was among those who spoke out against this new threat, alleging that protesters were paid to engage in criminal acts. The PNȚCD man Liviu Petrina claimed that Voiculescu had threatened to expel from Romania his party's deputy leader, Ion Rațiu. In an interview with Le Figaro, the Deputy Premier declared that the Golaniad was a "paltry travesty" of the revolutionary agenda. The piece became ridiculed at home for also featuring Voiculescu's ideological commitment to perennialism and the "sacred science", as well as his cryptic admittance to "liv[ing] between metaphysics and the clitoris."

Voiculescu later explained that he had actually said "catharsis", not clitoris. As author Adrian Mihalache noted in 2002, this appeared more as an excuse, making him seem hesitant; together, the quote and its apparent backpedaling damaged Voiculescu's reputation "even more than his dressing up as Che Guevara in December 1989." Upon first hearing of the interview in 1990, Dorin Tudoran observed that Voiculescu was heading for an existential crisis, since his involvement in the Ceaușescu and in the subsequent political violence could not have brought him peace, and since the sexual aspect of his worldview was "fleeting". As he noted, Voiculescu's bodyguard and likely mistress Cerasela had since quit her job and emigrated. In early 1991, satirist Florin Constantinescu depicted his imaginary meeting with Voiculescu, whom he depicted as using his official desk to read from the Kama Sutra and compose a prose poem, Ce e clitorisul și ce vrea el! ("What the Clitoris Is and Wants!").

In June 1990, Voiculescu was confirmed as the Senator for Buzău County, elected with the most votes cast in that constituency. Shortly after the count, the authorities began cracking down on Golaniad dissenters. Painter Mircea Bozan, who was detained at this stage, claims that he was also beaten to extract information on others, and that this procedure was personally overseen by Voiculescu (who denies the accusation). Pro-government violence eventually bled into the June 1990 Mineriad—whereby the Jiu Valley miners were brought to Bucharest and proceeded to attack the protesters, using their tools or other makeshift weapons. Trade union leader Miron Cozma, who was eventually prosecuted for his leadership of such squads, named Voiculescu and "two important colonels" as his personal contacts with Iliescu. According to Cozma, Voiculescu personally traveled to Petrila to make sure that the miners were embarking on trains heading for the capital. His account was corroborated by a miner from Vulcan, who saw the Deputy Minister boarding a helicopter, flying over the trains carrying the miners to Bucharest, and flashing the V sign at them. The Deputy Premier admitted to flying into the region at the time, alongside Cazimir Ionescu, but stated that they were there to deescalate, ultimately persuading some 30,000 miners not to follow their colleagues to Bucharest.

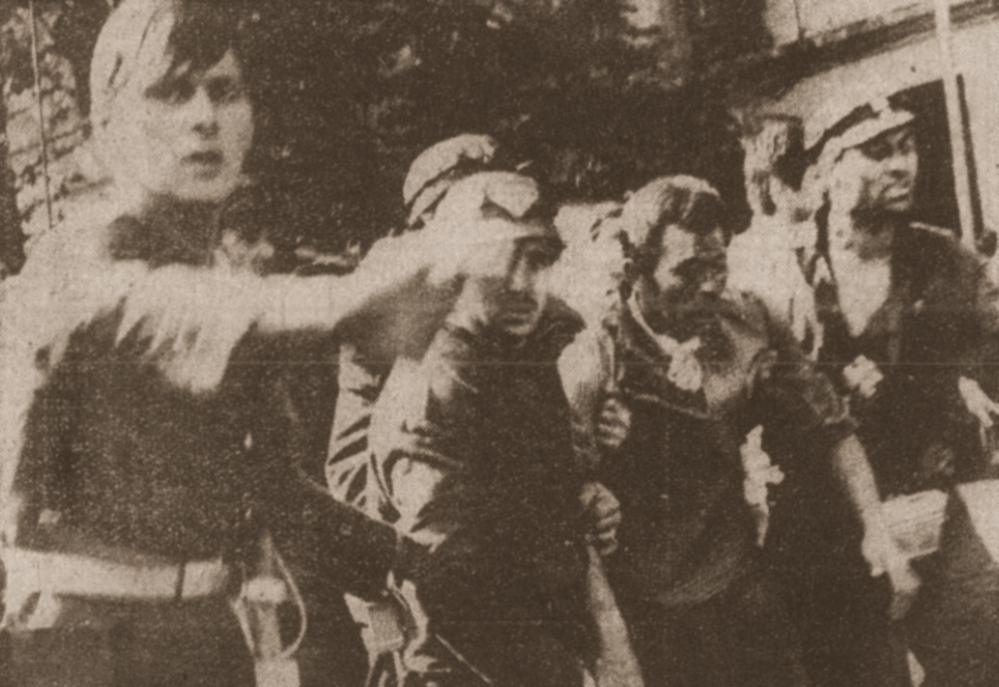
June 1990 Mineriad: miners escorting a captive whom they viewed as engaged in acts of terrorism

Several eyewitness accounts identify Voiculescu and Dan Iosif as leading a platoon of paratroopers, and indirectly the miners themselves, into storming the offices of opposition parties. His participation in such actions was reportedly backed by photographic evidence. Some witnesses specifically indicate that, on the morning of 14 June, Voiculescu was present at the main building of the PNȚCD, which was being ransacked—an alleged witness to the looting, he never intervened to stop it. For his part, Voiculescu only acknowledged (in a 1994 interview with Vartan Arachelian) that he had shaved and disguised himself, and had then "infiltrated" the Golaniad, supposedly uncovering evidence that the protest was being orchestrated by pro-Soviet forces (he thus went against Iliescu and Roman, who had depicted it as engineered by the Iron Guard).

Essayist Cătălin Ciolca notes that Voiculescu's public image as an "emperor of the miners" did not prevent him from serving on an official commission that investigated the very violence he was accused of. Voiculescu resented the coverage he received, and had a noted conflict with Cristoiu, who was serving as editor of Zig-Zag daily. He later acknowledged having used unlawful tactics to deal with the opposition: he convinced Zig-Zag's financial backer that Cristoiu was a KGB asset. This caused Cristoiu to be fired and replaced with Voiculescu's friend Adrian Păunescu. In late 1990, Voiculescu entered a public debate with Goma, after the latter had questioned his past under communism. His open letter to his critic appeared in România Literară, and marked the first time in history that a Romanian citizen published portions of their own Securitate file. In the aftermath, Voiculescu was defended by the staff writer at Contemporanul magazine, who observed that Goma was being oversuspicious.

== September Mineriad ==
During late 1990, Sanda Voicu, who had settled in Southern France, posed nude in Lui magazine, which also published her letter to her former husband, asking him to retire from politics. By 1991, Voiculescu's political controversies were also interfering with his scholarship. His Guénon biography was due to be issued at Humanitas, but then scrapped. According to Voiculescu, the publishers had come to regard him with the disdain of "false elitism". On 30 January, as the Târgu Mureș commission presented his report at the Metropolitan Palace, crowds of nationalists from all over Transylvania arrived at the location. They proceeded to boo Voiculescu as a perceived traitor, and referred to the FSN as subservient to the Democratic Union of Hungarians.

Tensions were also mounting inside the FSN's governing alliance, opposing Roman's cosmopolitan faction to the resurgent nationalists. The most outspoken of the latter were grouped into the Greater Romania Party (PRM), which, under Corneliu Vadim Tudor, was Iliescu's conditional ally. In June 1991, Voiculescu reacted against the PRM's radical stances with an article in Cotidianul, attacking Vadim personally: "[Vadim's] immorality is due to a strong psychological derangement and is currently being studied by some psychiatrists, who suppose him to be paranoid." Shortly after, Voiculescu and Păunescu assisted Győző Hajdu in establishing Együtt–Împreună, a non-governmental organization that supported good relations between Hungarians and Romanians. In late May 1991, speaking from the Senate rostrum, Voiculescu demanded that criminal proceedings be initiated against Eugen Barbu's Europa magazine, which had published content that he and others identified as violently antisemitic. That publication later put his name on a list of enemies, noting that, while not Jewish, he stood out as a "Jewified psychopath".

A new Mineriad in September 1991 was directly aimed at toppling Roman. In October, while the Roman cabinet was still holding on to power, Voiculescu's theories regarding the events were amply and repeatedly covered by TVR 1, leading writer Eugen Uricaru to argue that his narrative was being pushed as the official one. Roman and his 2002 interviewer Elena Ștefoi gave backing to Voiculescu's account, in particular when it came to its depiction of Roman as an economic liberal. They also agreed with the Deputy Premier regarding the supposed duplicity of opposition groups. The PNȚCD had fraternized with the miners over shared resentments, while the National Liberal Party had even considered joining the post-Roman governmental arc.

Voiculescu also went on public record with claims that, at its core, the Mineriad had been organized by an exiled millionaire, Iosif Constantin Drăgan, and his "left-nationalist" co-conspirators. He alleged that their original intent was to murder Roman and a handful of Hungarian Romanian community leaders. He described an underground paramilitary group, named by other witnesses as the "Legion of Justice", implying that Gheorghe Cazacov was its commander. He claimed that some of the money to be used for subversion came from the organizers of the Soviet hardliners' coup, trafficked by them through Cazacov's import–export firm and the Novosti news agency. Cazacov, who denied knowing any other of the supposed conspirators, asked for Voiculescu's parliamentary immunity be lifted, so that they could face each other in court. Drăgan issued his own immediate response, alleging that such claims could only be explained by Voiculescu's being either "demented" or "precociously senile", and initiating a lawsuit for libel. In one of his Senate speeches, Voiculescu formulated similar "serious accusations" against Ilie Verdeț, who was leading the Socialist Labor Party (PSM), and who likewise threatened to sue. As reported by Izvestia's Viktor Volodin, the SRI and other officials also had "restrained reactions", seemingly indicating that they did not believe Voiculescu; Volodin was however nominated as a potential Soviet spy in a SRI report of the same period.

On 4 October 1991, Voiculescu was barred by his nominal colleagues in the FSN from joining a senatorial investigation committee. Roman was finally deposed, with Iliescu's approval, in mid-October—the beginning of a FSN schism which eventually saw Iliescu forming his own, more dominant, Democratic Front of National Salvation (FDSN). Activist Nica Leon claims that, following their ouster, Roman and an "extremely shady" Voiculescu were for a while secretly allied with each other. Leon recounts that the two men and a government insider, Caius Traian Dragomir, were trying to establish a think tank "for intoxicating public opinion." In March 1992, Voiculescu announced that he would resign from the Senate, prompting speculation that Cazacov could now sue. Later that year, he also sparked a row with Măgureanu and the SRI as a whole: in May 1992, he published Măgureanu's unabridged Securitate dossier, showing that his rival had been a Securitate agent. Măgureanu regarded such actions as literal theft, but indicated that he would not pursue a lifting of Voiculescu's parliamentary immunity. By November 1992, Voiculescu had reconciled with Iulian Vlad, at a time when the latter was facing trial for illegally detaining people in Securitate custody. As Cristoiu noted, there was a "great campaign" to clear Vlad's name, and the former Deputy Premier agreed to participate in it, including by sending pro-Securitate opinion pieces to be published by Cristoiu's Expres Magazin.

== In Tunis ==
Upon resigning as senator in March 1992, Voiculescu became Romania's chargé d'affaires in Tunisia (full ambassador from 1994); having been personally offered that post by Iliescu. His relations with the FDSN were still tense in December 1992: the group's Radu Timofte, who presided upon the Senate Committee on National Security, described both him and Vadim Tudor as actively engaged in misinforming the public and destabilizing Romania. The Tunisian mission was interpreted by political commentators as a soft exile, its non-definitive nature indicative of the fact that Voiculescu had compromising info on the regime's inner workings. Novelist and political writer Mircea Mihăieș added his view that the Iliescu regime was entering a phase of absolute power, eliminating diversity of thought, and getting rid of "executors" such as Voiculescu and Stănculescu—after having first alienated "ideologues" such as Popescu-Dumnezeu. Doru Botoiu, columnist at Timișoara, contrarily believed that Voiculescu had been pushed out of the FSN circle of power and sent "somewhere in Africa" because of pressures from other segments of the governing alliance. These were the PRM and the PSM, who allegedly wanted to remove anyone associated with Roman.

Voiculescu's main interest was in improving Palestine–Romania relations, through near-permanent contacts with Fatah and the Palestine Liberation Organization. As such, he organized state visits to Bucharest by both Faisal Husseini and Yasser Arafat. At the time, journalist Dan Radu proposed that Iliescu was performing a "tightrope act", using Voiculescu in placating the Arab states while engaging in a détente with Israel. The ambassador formed a personal friendship with Arafat (who had been recently persuaded to endorse Iliescu, despite having been cultivated by Ceaușescu). As such, Voiculescu was allegedly a Romanian contributor to the Israeli–Palestinian peace process. His status as an indirect negotiator was partly confirmed by the Foreign Ministry's spokesman, Mircea Geoană, in October 1993.

From Tunis, the former Deputy Premier sent letters to be published in Păunescu's Totuși Iubirea, expressing his ongoing admiration for the poet. In January 1993, he explained that he and Păunescu together stood against both the "Russophiles" and the "anti-Securitate maniacs", and as such that they were being pushed to the margins. His own lawsuit with Drăgan now on an extended pause, Voiculescu tried to return into the public eye with a set of "revelations" about Romanian public figures. As Radu informs, he was largely ignored by the press. In mid-1994, he produced (likely tongue-in-cheek) allegations that Vadim Tudor's Hungarophobia was an act, meaning to conceal Vadim's being a plant of Hungary's Information Office, as well as ethnically Hungarian and racially Mongolian. Voiculescu also continued to monitor SRI activity from abroad, accusing Măgureanu of having slacked off, particularly when it came to counterespionage. By 1994, he was explicit in associating Măgureanu with a pro-Soviet faction that had supposedly obtained Iliescu's compliance. In March of that year, the press was fed old files showing contacts between Securitate men and Corneliu Coposu, who had since become chairman of the PNȚCD. The papers were ridiculed by party spokesman Radu Vasile, since they only showed that the communist agency had tried and failed to recruit Coposu. Vasile also identified Voiculescu as responsible for the leak and its tendentious presentation. Around then, the opposition Civic Alliance Party asked for a probe into the circumstances of Voiculescu's diplomatic debut, suggesting that he had never been vetted by Parliament.

Voiculescu was called up from his service during the various investigations of the 1989 events, appearing before a senatorial committee on 30 May 1994; probed by the PNȚCD's Valentin Gabrielescu, he gave an hour-by-hour account of his whereabouts on 21 December 1989, which came to be noted for both its revelations and its inconsistencies. Also in 1994, he got his Guénon study published at Editura Georgiana of Bucharest. Scholar Marcel Tolcea dismisses parts of it as superfluous or self-serving, but admires Voiculescu's genuine scholarship and "prodigious memory". Literary historian Ion Papuc praises the book as "well-written, well-researched, and not veering into any sort of fiction", while journalist Șerban Cionoff speaks of the "lively interest" it sparked, for approaching a communist-era taboo. It is described by historian Jean-Pierre Laurant as the first Guénon monograph in all of Eastern Europe. Voiculescu followed up in 1996 by curating a collection of Tăslăuanu's essays, selected for their advocacy of the Paneuropean Union. It also included Voiculescu's preface, which justified his grandfather's lifelong conflict with the Brătianu family, in terms that cultural sociologist Zigu Ornea sees as unfair.

In August 1995, again in Tunis, Voiculescu spoke to L'Espresso about his revolutionary tenure and his friendship with the convicted Italian politician, Bettino Craxi. The short interview included additional detail about the Ceaușescus' end, veering into the paranormal. In January 1996, he did another interview for the French far-right paper La Lutte du Peuple. Reviewed by L'Express as an "ultra-fascist", he restated his admiration for Khomeini and for the "traditionalist restoration", while deriding the parliamentary system. Wishing to carry on as ambassador, Voiculescu declined to run in the general elections in November 1996, in which he voted, as a protest, with the Tatars' Union. The elections witnessed a sweep by the PNȚCD-led Democratic Convention (CDR). Its candidate, Emil Constantinescu, also won the presidential race against the incumbent Iliescu. Voiculescu quit his post on 19 November, as part of a wave of diplomats who "sensed that they would no longer be spending much more time in their assignments". Voiculescu himself noted that he had wanted to "rally with the losing camp", rather than be forced to witness a mass recall of diplomats. His resignation was registered by the outgoing President Iliescu, who signed it into law on 5 December 1996.

== PDSR recruitment ==
In December 1996, Voiculescu was interviewed by Păunescu regarding the CDR's victory. He provided his views on President Constantinescu, in terms that he described as satirical, and which Păunescu himself viewed as mean. Now declaring himself a figure of the "extra-parliamentary opposition", Voiculescu joined Iliescu's newly formed Party of Social Democracy (PDSR) in early 1997, noting that he had only did so to be by Iliescu's side, while saluting his commitment to "internal stability and a balanced foreign policy". He also chided Teodor Meleșcanu for leading a PDSR schism, and centered his own discourse on republicanism—against the CDR-led push for a restoration of monarchic institutions, he created and led the "Romanian Foundation for Republic and Democracy" (FRD). He argued that the only way to bring about the monarchy was through a civil war, in which he would take up arms for the republican side; he also described the monarchists as "a foul class of losers" engaged in a political experiment, itself designed by the "dark cellars" of unnamed Western powers. He and another Iliescu associate, Răzvan Theodorescu, also set up a "Democratic Forum", which sought to replicate and defeat Atlanticist NGOs such as the Civic Alliance network.

Voican spearheaded the effort to defeat the PNȚCD legislation in agriculture, accusing that group of favoring the interests of landowners and corporate farming against smallholders, and as such of destroying its own "Peasantist" brand. Under the CDR cabinets, which he described as "anti-national" and dictatorial, his status as a revolutionary came to be questioned by parliamentary committees: in May 1997, one such panel decided that his "revolutionary certificate" be withdrawn, but he was reinstated by another committee before the end of the month. In June, he appeared at a feast honoring Tăslăuanu at Bilbor, indicating that he was there not just as a relative, but also as Iliescu's envoy. Voiculescu's feud with the CDR became more visible during the same weeks, when the PNȚCD Minister of Culture and former revolutionary leader Ion Caramitru publicly accused him of having "brought the miners to Bucharest, in June 1990." The Association of Mineriad Victims formulated a criminal complaint, targeting Voiculescu, Iliescu, Roman, Cozma and various others, together accused of incitement.

Voiculescu also censured the PNȚCD from an anti-Catholic position, seeing the party as obedient toward the Greek Catholic hierarchy. At the PDSR national conference of June 1997, he declared that Greek Catholicism only existed as a consequence of forced conversion among Transylvania's Orthodox believers, and that the state should not tolerate either the building or reclamation of any Catholic village churches. In early 1998, an FRD team comprising Voiculescu, Iliescu, Theodorescu, Antonie Iorgovan and Nicolae Cajal petitioned government not to bestow automatic citizenship on the deposed King, Michael I, suggesting that doing so would violate the 1991 constitution. Also then, Voiculescu went public with his claim that President Constantinescu's son Dragoș had been involved in illegal trafficking at Otopeni Airport. Constantinescu Jr initiated a lawsuit for libel. Voiculescu had to publicly apologize and retract his statement, upon which the lawsuit was dropped.

Voiculescu spent some of his time trying to defend the UM 0215 from being dismantled by the CDR's Interior Minister, Gavril Dejeu. During a live show on Prima TV, he presented the January 1999 Mineriad, which Dejeu had contained, as a legitimate protest movement—seemingly contradicting his own claims about the miners as KGB assets. On 28 March, at a time when Romania was taking NATO's side in its bombing of Yugoslavia, he led the Association of Christian Orthodox Students in their protest march through Bucharest. In one of his TV appearances to discuss the crisis, he argued that Russia had registered a moral victory, in that it had made America "show its true colors". With Theodorescu, Alexandru Mironov, George Pruteanu and Dan Zamfirescu, he signed a letter of support for Slobodan Milošević and his handling of the Kosovo War. Present at the Yugoslav embassy for Constitution Day (27 April 1999), he toasted to the anti-globalist resistance, now stating his belief in "the national idea".

By mid-2000, Voiculescu and Vadim Tudor were regular guests of Păunescu's nighttime program on Tele7ABC, where they usually tackled issues pertaining to the revolution and the legacy of communism. In the general elections of November 2000, Iliescu faced an unexpected challenge from Vadim Tudor, who entered the second round of the presidential race. During the debates that followed, the PRM leader emulated the CDR, exposing his rival's associations with Voiculescu and other figures whom right-wing voters saw as corrupt or shady. Once Theodorescu had entered the parliamentary race as a PDSR candidate, Voiculescu and the FRD were accused of campaigning for Iliescu, but denied that this was true. Vadim was defeated in the second round, and Iliescu returned as head of state. Voiculescu was reportedly by his side during the voting, the count, and throughout election night. For a while, he was a credible contender for director of Foreign Intelligence, but was supposedly overruled from any post of importance by Adrian Năstase, the Premier-designate.

== Moroccan mission and IRRD ==
On 1 March 2001, Iliescu made Voiculescu his ambassador in Morocco. This return to office did not completely satisfy his demands: also in 2001, Voiculescu entered a protracted conflict with the Romanian state, after arguing that he had preemption rights to a villa in Primăverii, occupied by him as a state official since 1990. Though his interpretation of the law was struck down by the High Court of Cassation and Justice in February 2012, he continued to ask for the property; in 2015, he was also sued by the autonomous directorate for the administration of state assets, which claimed from him a number of unpaid dues. Meanwhile, his revolutionary career was again being formally scrutinized, this time by the military prosecutor Dan Voinea. In February 2004, after revelations that the Ceaușescus' file was missing from the archives, Voinea decided to retry the case, asking the 1989 winesses, Voiculescu included, to show up for questioning. Voiculescu regarded this as a political decision, claiming that Voinea had broken the law in ordering the file reopened.

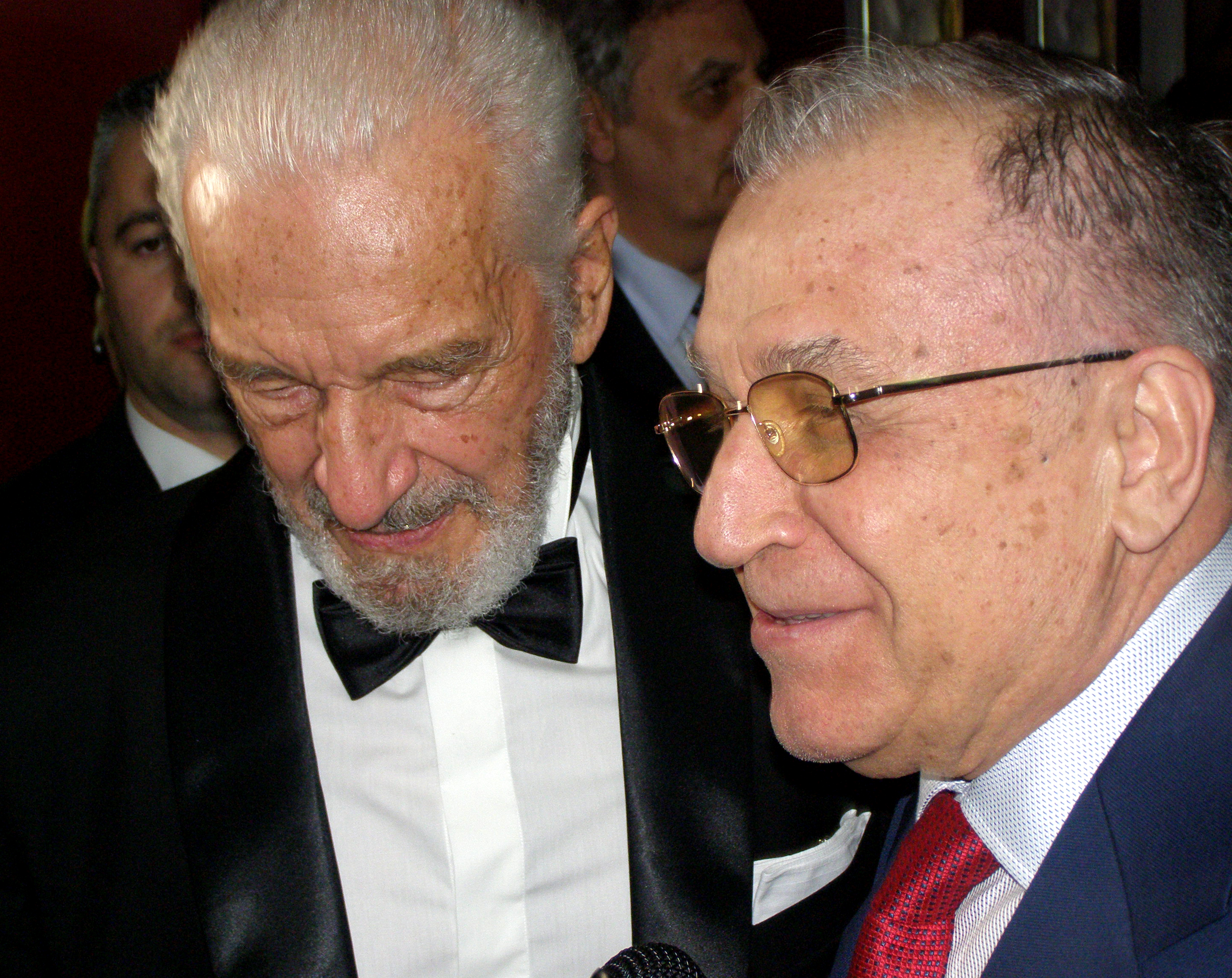
Ion Iliescu (on the right) and fellow revolutionary combatant Sergiu Nicolaescu in April 2008

The November 2004 election came as another political upheaval: the PDSR, reorganized as the "Social Democratic Party" (PSD) was overall defeated by the right-wing Justice and Truth Alliance. As one of his last acts in office, Iliescu established an "Institute of the Romanian Revolution" (IRRD), presided upon by a panel that included Voiculescu. Additionally, Iliescu secured Voiculescu and his own privileges as fighters in the revolution by having them signed into one of his final presidential decrees. Another such act inducted Voiculescu into the Order of Victory of the 1989 Revolution—one of several recipients described by investigative reporter Răzvan Savaliuc as Iliescu's cronies. In late January 2005, the new Minister of Foreign Affairs, Mihai Răzvan Ungureanu, recalled Voiculescu to Bucharest. A month later, Ungureanu also publicized a list of diplomats that he viewed as servile and incompetent, which included Voiculescu's name. In May, upon his return to Bucharest, Voiculescu with Roman appeared at a TVR 1 rountable, discussing his take on the Golaniad. The Civic Alliance's Sorin Ilieșiu criticized this editorial choice, arguing that the two alleged culprits had been allowed to monopolize the show with their own interpretation.

As part of her legal bid to revisit her parents' execution and verify their material remains, Zoia Ceaușescu asked for an exhumation, and called for several witnesses, including Voiculescu, to take the stand. A court struck down both her demands in September 2005. During March 2006, military prosecutors, who had reopened the case regarding the events of June 1990, subpoenaed him and some other 20 suspects. He stated his innocence, again pointing to the Soviets as the interested party. Voiculescu resigned from the IRRD in August 2006, when that institution's public mission was being called into question. During November 2006, he was called back for interrogation regarding the Mineriad, alongside co-defendants Iliescu and Măgureanu. At the time, he was active within Florentin Scalețchi's Organization for the Defense of Human Rights (OADO), which controversially reunited former dissidents, a convicted sex-offender, and a Securitate colonel. Upon Scalețchi's arrest on suspicion of influence peddling, Voiculescu took over as OADO's director.

Also in 2006, the former Securitate cadre Liviu Turcu published a list of his former agents, nominating those who had successfully entered the political scene after 1989; Voiculescu was one of the prominent names. He denied the charges as a smear campaign; Oprea claims that he could only do so because, during his time in government, "he had all the time in the world to destroy his own [Securitate] file", which would have been handed down to him by Goran. Turcu further alleged that, in December 1989, Voiculescu and his armed staff had kidnapped members of Securitate's directorate for foreign operations, forcing them to hand down a list of Romanian spies abroad. Voiculescu fought off the accusations, deeming them "phantasmagoric".

Voiculescu was an observer at a Primăverii precinct for the PSD-backed referendum of May 2007, aiming to impeach the right-wing President Traian Băsescu. He was also recruited by a "Think Tank of the Romanian Left", established in early 2009 by Iliescu and Năstase with other PSD figures—at a time when their old-generation faction was being marginalized by party leader Mircea Geoană. Voiculescu's comments on international politics featured renewed criticism of NATO and of its missile defense system, which he regarded as having turned Romania into a legitimate target for Russian retaliation; he also derided Mikheil Saakashvili as NATO's proxy in the Russo-Georgian War. Alongside Iliescu and others, the former Deputy Prime Minister was spared criminal prosecution in the Mineriad dossier during June 2009. This followed a legal dispute in which the Directorate for Investigating Organized Crime and Terrorism had overruled prosecutor Voinea, assessing that the case he was building relied on "whimsical" claims.

== Old age and prosecution ==
Almost exactly after the 2009 ruling, voices within the PSD suggested that Voiculescu could take over as the Secretary of State for Revolutionaries in the First Boc Cabinet. This in turn sparked a protest by the National Revolutionaries' Bloc. The issue of his pre-1989 connections was revisited by Gregorian Bivolaru, a Romanian yogi, who alleged that Voiculescu had informed on him before his confinement to a psychiatric ward in 1984. Voiculescu admitted only to being present as the Securitate was arresting Bivolaru, and to pranking its agents with purpusefully outlandish statements. The National Council for the Study of the Securitate Archives, who heard compaints from Bivolaru's disciples in July 2010, issued verdicts suggesting that Voiculescu had been both a target and informant during the Ceaușescu era.

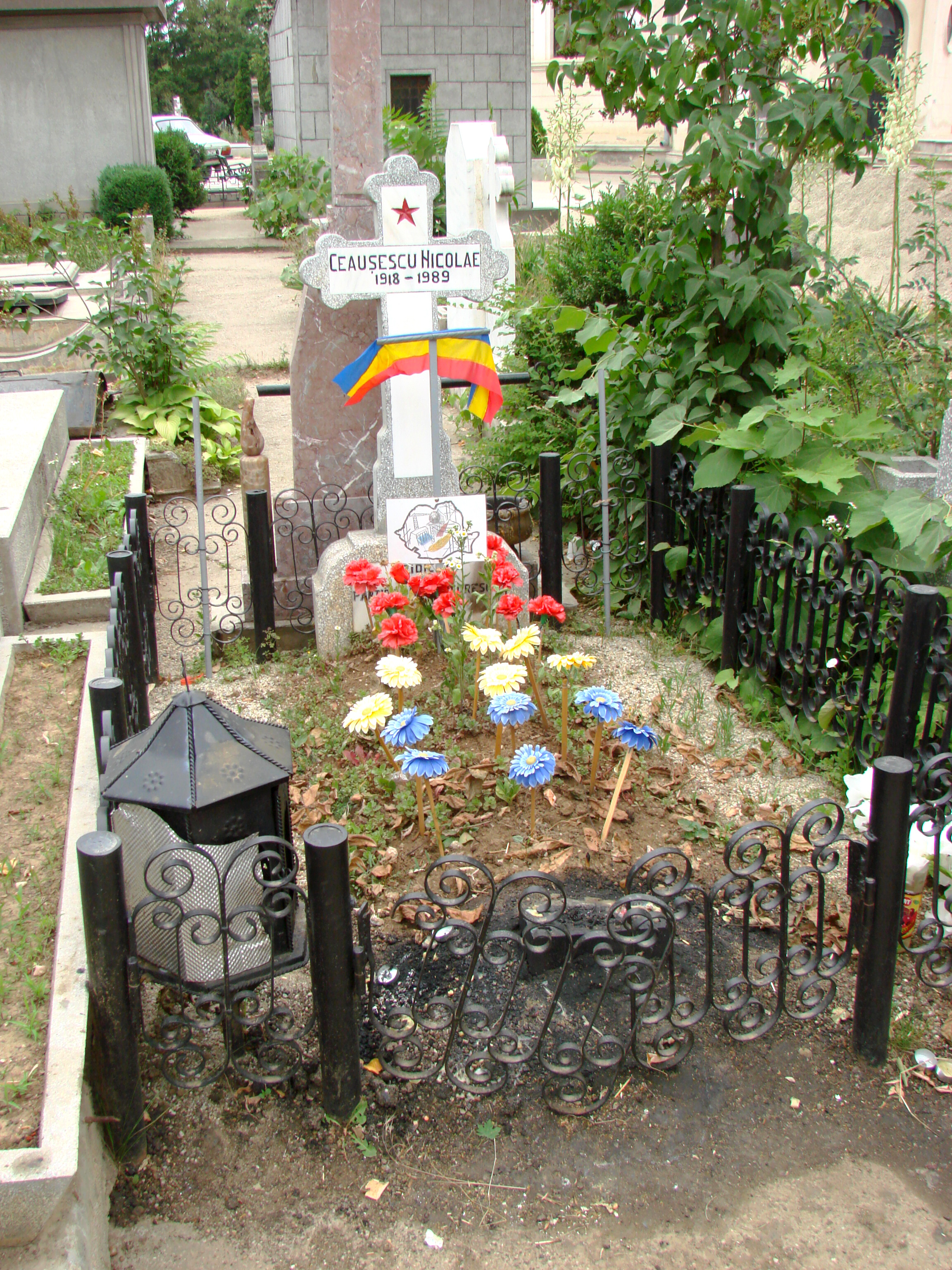
Nicolae Ceaușescu's first grave, as it looked in 2007

Although engaged politically on the left, in the 2010s Voiculescu was arguing that "left" and "right" had been stripped of their true meaning. By 2018, he was describing himself as a "true conservative" and an "elitist". Following his return from Morocco, he had largely abandoned party politics: spending time with his family, he also wrote a monograph of philosophical mathematics, documenting connections between Guénon and Leibniz. It appeared at Editura Semne in late 2008. He also returned to astrology, describing himself as its meticulously scientific practitioner. He was at the center of a literary controversy in 2009–2011, after his letters to Tașcu Gheorghiu had been published by the journal Manuscriptum, under the false assumption that they were from Gellu Naum; Voiculescu outed himself as the author, having been informed of this misunderstanding by writer Nicolae Tzone. The Ceaușescus' exhumation was finally allowed in July 2010, after the heirs, including Zoia's widowed husband Mircea Oprean, had gained legal possession over the Ghencea burial plots. Oprean declared that he still regarded Voiculescu as the murderer of his in-laws. In December, the Swiss Romanian lawyer Radu Golban, who claimed to have gathered evidence that Germany owed Romania some 19 billion Euro in unpaid dues, also alleged that Voiculescu had physically threatened him—for reasons that Golban himself could not explain. Voiculescu was censured in the press when, in February 2011, he stated that he was entitled to 750,000 Euro in compensation for his communist-era imprisonment, under the provisions of a law that provided reparations for Securitate victims. One of his critics, Lazăr Lădariu, declared his indignation at what he perceived as "slippery maneuvers" against "Romania herself", reminding Voiculescu that his prosecution was a common-law one, and also repeating Bivolaru's allegations against him.

During early 2012, Voiculescu, like Iliescu and others, was stripped of his pension as a state-recognized revolutionary. The popular decision came from the right-wing Premier Emil Boc, albeit with backing from PSD chairman Victor Ponta. However, when Ponta formed his own cabinet later the same year, he reversed that order. By July 2016, during a nominally technocratic Cioloș Cabinet, he had been made counselor of the state minister for revolutionary issues, despite continued opposition from his peers. In February 2015, after the European Court of Human Rights had ruled that Romania needed to investigate in full the crimes of the Mineriads, Prosecutor General Tiberiu Nițu asked President Klaus Iohannis for approval to begin a criminal investigation, with Iliescu, Roman and Voiculescu named as potential culprits. In April 2018, Nițu's successor Augustin Lazăr, having concluded that there was no power vacuum between Ceaușescu and Iliescu, and therefore that all loss of human life in the interval had to be accounted for by those in government at the time, approached Iohannis for an authorization to initiate criminal proceedings against the same individuals; Iohannis gave the go-ahead. Voiculescu's role in television broadcasts during the revolution was cited as a central piece of evidence that the FSN had resorted to "diversionary" instigation; on 15 May, he was formally charged with "crimes against humanity". Voiculescu viewed himself as targeted by electioneering and political vendettas.

Voiculescu and Ana Carmen Pahomi had four children, with the youngest being aged nine in 2011 (at a time when Gelu was already a grandfather). After Pahomi's death from a heart attack in August 2018, Voiculescu married his third wife, the 37-year-old Georgiana Arsene, in October 2019; based in Buzău, she was working as a journalist for Russia's Sputnik agency. In March 2018, the IRRD had re-inducted Voiculescu into its directorate, which was led by Iliescu. As such, Voiculescu had another publicized row with IRRD members such as Caramitru, Radu Filipescu and Teodor Mărieș, whom he expelled in June 2019 citing technical irregularities in their original applications. On 22 December, Voiculescu and his wife celebrated the revolution's 30th anniversary, attending a public function in University Square. He was booed by others in the audience, then assaulted and injured, requiring him to be escorted out by the Gendarmerie. A man was stopped for questioning as the alleged perpetrator; his weapon was identified as a cane. The incident prompted a blog post by the former Prime Minister and PSD eminence Năstase, who claimed it as illustrative for the "normal Romania" being constructed by Iohannis. According to Năstase, Iohannis was personally invested in erasing all trace of left-wing participation in the revolution, as a step toward totalitarian democracy.

Voiculescu resigned from the IRRD on 1 October 2021, at the same time as Iliescu; they were respectively replaced with Roman and Andrei Ursu (son of the murdered dissident Gheorghe Ursu). In August 2022, both Voiculescu and Iliescu were again charged with "crimes against humanity", on orders from Prosecutor General Gabriela Scutea. This referred to their handling of national affairs between 22 and 30 December 1989, when there were "857 deaths, 2,382 injuries [and] 585 cases of detainment" directly attributable to the FSN leadership, accused of having encouraged "generalized friendly fire"; Voiculescu was personally indicated as responsible for misinforming public opinion in his televised addresses. Iliescu in particular fought the charges, and his lawyers presented their case before the High Court. In 2024, its magistrates ruled that the dossier had technical irregularities, and that the military prosecutor could either withdraw it or presenting it as such to a regular court. In March 2025, the office of the prosecutor announced that it would still seek sentencing for the group. The case against Iliescu was closed with the former president's death in August. Voiculescu attended the funeral, deploring the loss of "a great statesman", with whom he had had a "cordial and natural relationship." In April 2026, the Mineriad prosecution was struck down by the High Court, which demanded that the evidence be reexamined.
