= Brigada Antiteroristă =

Counter-Terrorism Brigade
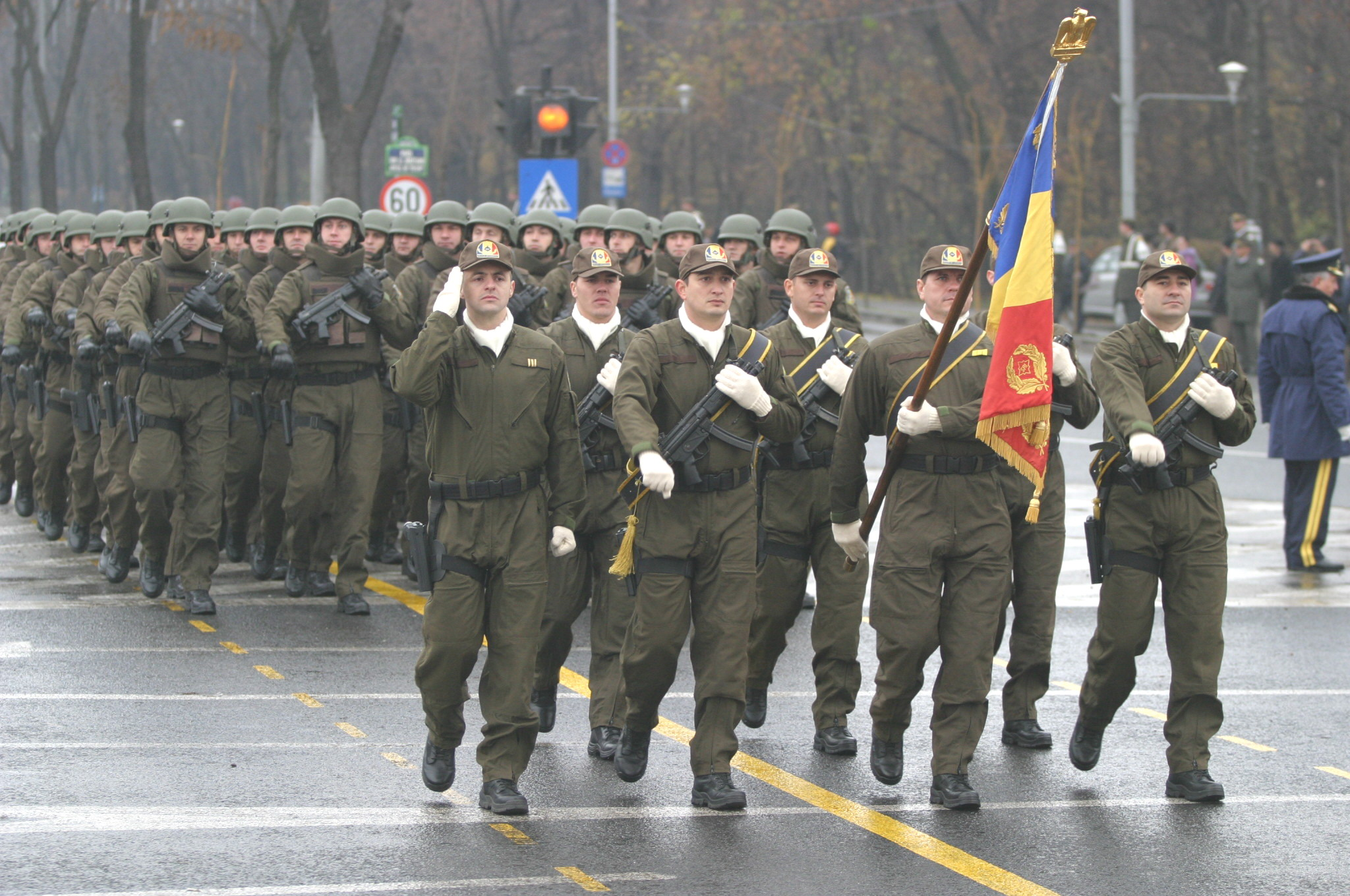
- A detachment of the BAT (2008)
- Active: 1977 (re-organized in 1990)
- Country: Romania
- Branch: Romanian Intelligence Service
- Type: Special operations
- Size: Brigade
- Garrison/HQ: Bucharest

Insignia
- Emblem

Brigada Antiteroristă (Romanian pronunciation: [briˈɡada antiteroˈristə], lit. 'Counter-terrorism Brigade', BAT), nicknamed Air Hawks (Romanian: șoimii aerului), is a tactical special operations unit of the Romanian Intelligence Service (SRI) specialized in counterterrorism and hostage rescue crisis management, as well as high-risk tactical special operations.

== Mission ==
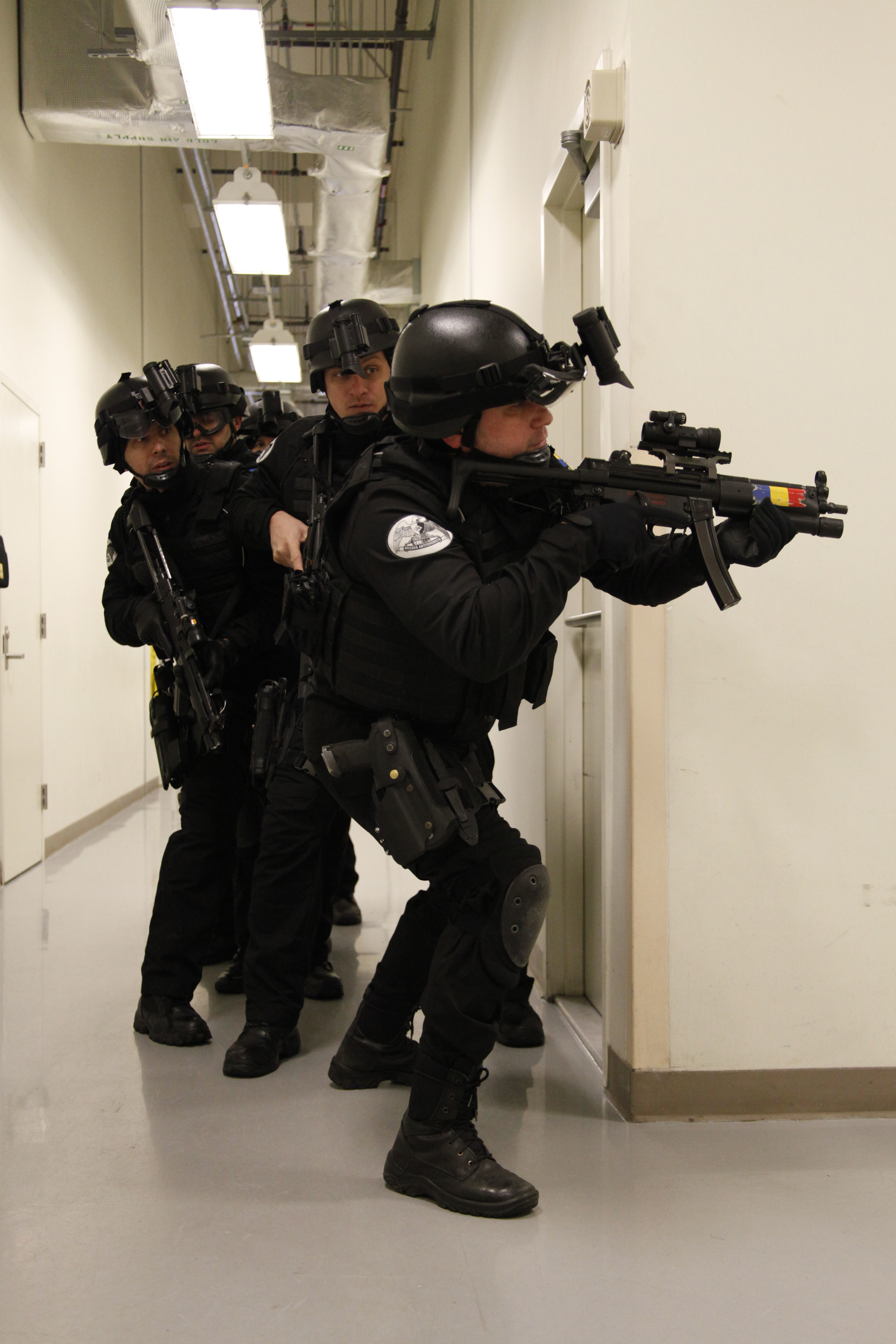
Service personnel of the brigade demonstrate room clearing techniques

The unit's missions primarily involve counterterrorism, providing security for Romania's sixteen civilian airports, provide security on flights performed by Romanian aviation companies, providing pyrotechnical interventions for the facilities that in its permanent or temporary responsibility, providing diplomatic security measures for the facilities or individuals the Romanian Intelligence Service is responsible for, and tactical special operations.

== History ==
The unit was established on December 15, 1977 under the name of Unitatea Specială de Luptă Antiteroristă (Special Counter-terrorism Unit, USLA) as a result of the emergence of terrorist threats that were directly or indirectly aimed at Romania.

USLA confronted attempts by members or sympathizers of different terrorist organizations to enter Romania. These organizations did not limit themselves to precursory acts of preparing violent actions, but they also tried to organize terrorist attacks, the targets generally being foreign official representatives in Bucharest.

On May 26, 1985, two Arab terrorists placed explosive devices under the cars belonging to Syrian students' leaders, in the Grozăvești Campus parking lot in Bucharest. Two USLA officers were killed by the blast of the device while trying to defuse it. USLA units were involved in the violent crackdown of anti-communist demonstrations during the Romanian Revolution of 1989.

On December 24, 1989, the USLA was called upon by the new Defence Minister Nicolae Militaru to protect the site of the Ministry of Defence from alleged terrorist attacks. The tanks guarding the site opened fire and killed eight officers, while the other six survivors were arrested and one fled. This deadly hoax was used by the new authorities to claim that the terrorist threat really existed.

On the December 26, 1989, the USLA was attached to the Romanian Ministry of Defence. On July 1, 1990, the name of the unit was changed to Brigada Antiteroristă and incorporated into the newly created Romanian Intelligence Service (SRI). On August 20, 1991, four Sikh terrorists attempted to assassinate the Indian ambassador while he walked with his wife on the Aviatorilor Boulevard in Bucharest. The quick intervention of anti-terrorist officers guarding the ambassador resulted in failure for the terrorists: one was killed on the spot, another was captured, the third was injured, and the fourth person vanished. The criminal investigation revealed that the four terrorists belonged to an Indian Sikh terrorist group. In November of 2014, President Traian Basescu conferred the National Order "Faithful Service" - in the rank of Knight to the Battle Flag of the Anti-Terrorist Brigade to show his appreciation for the unit's work in combating terrorism and their professionalism.

In January 2015, the SRI Control Parliamentary Committee requested a check be done on the Romanian Intelligence Service's (SRI) anti-terrorist brigade and at the Cyber center during the upcoming period to see the agency's response to terrorist attacks and cyber incidents. The committee indicated that, compared to 2013, the number of cyber attacks terrorism incidents in the country had greatly increased. They wanted to make sure the agency was capable of effectively addressing these threats. The Brigada Antiteroristă participated in the 14th Annual Warrior Competition (14AWC) and earned first place for the fourth event in the competition, called steel arrow, which was a sniper challenge.

== Current activities ==
At present, there is an increased flow of information shared with partner-foreign services tasked with fighting terrorism. Backed up by state-of-the-art equipment and counter-terrorism tactics, the unit is always on the alert.

The Romanian Intelligence Service, including the Brigada Antiteroristă, has a tradition of being part of a parade on Great Union Day.

Following the September 11, 2001 attacks in the United States, the Inspectorate for Preventing and Fighting Terrorism was confronted with new challenges. To tackle the new terrorist threats, specialized units of the Romanian Intelligence Service implemented special plans designed for such circumstances.

== Equipment ==
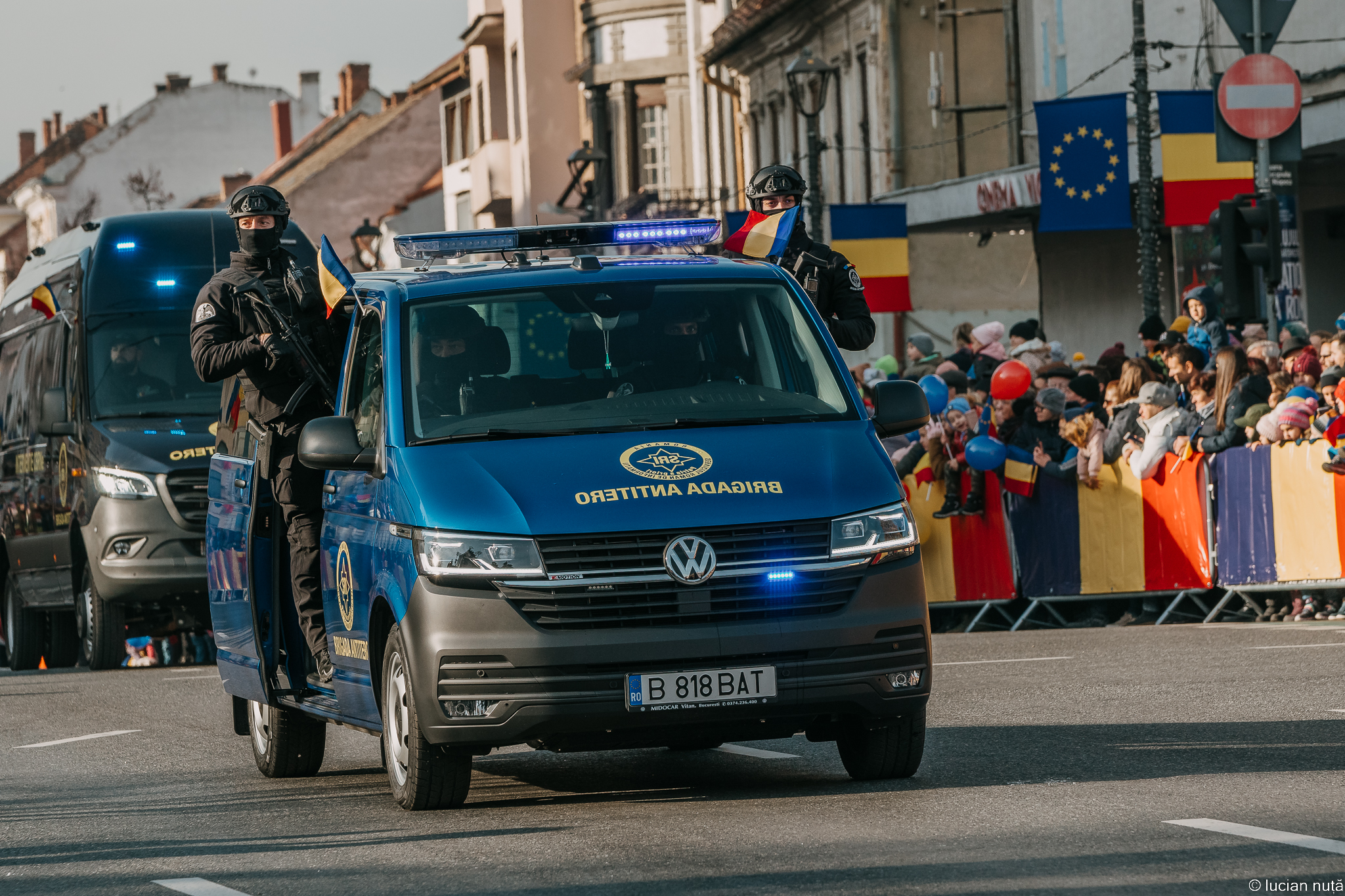
Vehicles of the BAT

Model	Caliber
Pistols
Glock	9×19mm
Submachine guns
Heckler & Koch MP5A3	9×19mm
Heckler & Koch MP7	HK 4.6×30mm
Assault rifles
PM md. 86	5.45×39mm
Sniper rifles
AWP	7.62×51mm
Brügger & Thomet APR	7.62×51mm
Heckler & Koch PSG1	7.62×51mm
PSL	7.62×54mmR

== Other tactical units that operate in Romania ==
- Direcția Generală de Protecție Internă's Grupul Special de Protecție și Intervenție
- Romanian Police's Serviciul pentru Intervenții și Acțiuni Speciale
- Jandarmeria Română's Brigada Specială de Intervenție a Jandarmeriei
- Protection and Guard Service's Secția Intervenții Anti-Teroriste
- Foreign Intelligence Service's Grupul Antiterorist

== Similar units from other countries ==
- US Central Intelligence Agency's Special Activities Center
- French Directorate-General for External Security's Action Division
- British MI6's E Squadron
- Russian Foreign Intelligence Service's Zaslon
- Israeli Mossad's Caesarea Division
- Pakistani Inter-Services Intelligence's Covert Action Division
- Indonesian State Security Agency's Rajawali unit
