= Radu Timofte =

Romanian politician and general (1949–2009)

Alexandru-Radu Timofte (Romanian pronunciation: [ˈradu tiˈmofte]; 7 April 1949 – 19 October 2009) was a Romanian soldier, politician and spy chief. A member of the Social Democratic Party (PSD), he sat in the Romanian Senate from 1990 to 2001, representing Neamț County. From 2001 to 2006, he headed Serviciul Român de Informații (SRI), the country's domestic intelligence service.

== Biography ==
Born in Horia, Neamț County, Timofte attended the Roman-Vodă High School in Roman and then graduated from the Command and General Staff Faculty of the Military Academy in Bucharest. He was an active-duty officer at the Interior Ministry until 1988, when he was sent into the reserves because his sister had remained abroad illegally. Right after the fall of the Communist regime in 1989, Timofte participated in governing the town of Roman as a member of the local National Salvation Front (FSN) Council.

He was elected senator in 1990, 1992, 1996, and 2000, for the National Salvation Front (FSN) and its successor organisations, the Democratic National Salvation Front (FDSN) and the Party of Social Democracy in Romania (PDSR), which evolved into the Social Democratic Party (PSD) shortly before he left the legislature. As senator, he was president of a commission of enquiry into the September 1991 Mineriad (1991–92), vice president of the Romanian parliamentary commission to the NATO Parliamentary Assembly, a member of the defence, public safety and national security committee (1992–2001) and vice president of the joint parliamentary committee providing oversight to the activities of the Foreign Intelligence Service. He drafted more than fifteen pieces of legislation, which were adopted by Parliament. Timofte resigned his Senate seat in February 2001.

Days earlier, he had been named director of Serviciul Român de Informații (SRI) by President Ion Iliescu and had won parliamentary confirmation. Later that year, he was made Brigadier General in the reserves, becoming a Knight of the Order of the Star of Romania in 2002. In July 2006, together with Foreign Intelligence Service director Gheorghe Fulga and Direcția Generală de Protecție Internă head Virgil Ardelean, he resigned this office as a result of the controversy generated by the release and disappearance of terrorism suspect Omar Hayssam. At the time, it was noted that, whereas the three holdovers from previous administrations kept their positions after new President Traian Băsescu praised the intelligence services for returning to Romania in May 2005 three hostages whose kidnapping in Iraq was masterminded by Hayssam, it was also the latter's flight that cost them their jobs.

In June 2009, he was indicted by National Anticorruption Directorate prosecutors for having allegedly purchased his work home at a below-market price—he paid €35,000 for an apartment said to be worth around €200,000; the trial began in September. Also that summer, he refused to confirm or deny allegations that Romania had hosted a Central Intelligence Agency black site several years earlier. Timofte did meet with CIA director George Tenet twice in 2002, receiving a medal from him in Washington, D.C., and secretly in Constanța in 2002. Timofte, aged 60, died in October 2009 from leukemia, having been at the SRI hospital for several days. He was survived by his wife and three children. Three days later, he was buried with military honours in his native village at a funeral attended by some 5,000 people, including locals, county officials, politicians from various parties, SRI commanders, SPP heads, and businesspeople. The Romanian Orthodox service was held by a bishop from nearby Roman and fourteen priests.
