= Grupul Antiterorist =

Grupul Antiterorist (The Anti-Terrorist Group) is an anti-terrorist unit belonging to the Romanian Foreign Intelligence Service.

== History ==
Allegedly, in 1998 the Romanian Government decided that SIE needed a small anti-terrorist detachment, which could be used in capturing terrorist elements abroad, in cooperation with similar friendly structures from NATO.

Thus, the detachment was created, with members taken mainly from Romania's national anti-terrorist authority, the Brigada Antiteroristă of the Romanian Intelligence Service (SRI, Romanian Intelligence Service). The small detachment was composed of only 23 operatives.

Over the years, their number was decreased to 15 operatives. The Group's activities are unknown, and the unit was secret until its existence was revealed by the Romanian President Traian Băsescu in a public speech, where he thanked the Group for taking part in the liberation of the three Romanian journalists held hostage in Iraq in 2005. This created confusion among the written press in Romania, with some newspapers claiming the operators had actually been from Brigada Antiteroristă, while others were speaking of an entire "Anti-Terrorist Brigade of SIE".

However, Băsescu continued to praise the Group's activity on many occasions, including its alleged cooperation with similar NATO structures. It is highly unlikely that the President himself, who was the head of the Emergency Response Cell created to deal with the hostage crisis, was confused about the unit's very existence. Therefore, it is logical to assume that this unit truly exists, and that, according to Băsescu and his hostage negotiation team, eight of its fifteen members were present in Baghdad during the hostage crisis, and managed to free all three hostages and bring them back to Romania.

As an additional element to support this assumption, combatants with face-masks were seen disembarking from the Romanian Air Force C-130 aircraft which brought the hostages back to Bucharest.
