= Grupul Special de Protecție și Intervenție =

Special Group for Protection and Intervention
- Active: 2003–2009; 2015–present
- Country: Romania
- Branch: General Directorate for Internal Security (Ministry of Internal Affairs)
- Type: Police tactical unit
- Size: 95
- Garrison/HQ: Bucharest

Grupul Special de Protecție și Intervenţie (GSPI, English: (Special Group for Protection and Intervention) is the tier one police tactical unit of the Romanian General Directorate for Internal Security (DGPI) (Romanian: Direcția Generală de Protecție Internă) part of the Ministry of Internal Affairs. The designated nickname of the unit is Acvila, which is Romanian for "Eagle".

== Mission ==
The unit's missions primarily involve anti-irregular military, apprehension of armed and dangerous criminals, counterterrorism and hostage rescue crisis management, executive protection, high-risk tactical law enforcement situations, operating in difficult to access terrain, protecting high-level meeting areas, providing security in areas at risk of attack or terrorism, special reconnaissance in difficult to access and dangerous areas, support crowd control and riot control, and tactical special operations.

== History ==
GSPI was established in January 2003 to satisfy the European Union requirements regarding counterterrorism, hostage rescue crisis management, and internal protection following the Moscow theater hostage crisis in October 2002 and reported to the Ministry of Interior and Administrative Reform. Two Romanian police officers had conducted a study tour of EU countries police tactical units prior to the formation and significant assistance was provided from Germany's GSG 9 with the creation and development of GSPI.

In 2007, GSPI joined the European Union ATLAS Network with other EU countries national police tactical units. In March 2009, GSPI was disbanded after a corruption scandal.

In 2015, GSPI was re-established as part of the Directorate of Intelligence and Internal Security, later renamed to General Directorate for Internal Security.

== Structure ==
GSPI structure is similar to GSG9 with a Combat group, Sniper team and Protection team.

=== Selection ===
Pre-selection lasts 10-14 days, and selection usually lasts between 30 and 45 days. At the end of these two first trials, only 15% of applicants are validated. After that, a final exam follows, and if the candidate passes, he is now a member of the team. Three to five more years will then be dedicated for him to fully qualify in all the skills needed to become an operational member, during which he is trained in abseiling, aggressive car driving, climbing and descending, combat diving, commando tactics, CQB/CQC, defusing and disposal of bombs and land mines, electronics proficiency, explosives, hostage rescue, infiltrate the area with a helicopter, instinctive shooting, international counterterrorism, marksmanship, NBCR on operations in contaminated environments, parachuting, reconnaissance, SERE, tactical first aid, VIP protection, and other disciplines.
