= Brigada Specială de Intervenție a Jandarmeriei =

Special Intervention Brigade of the Jandarmerie
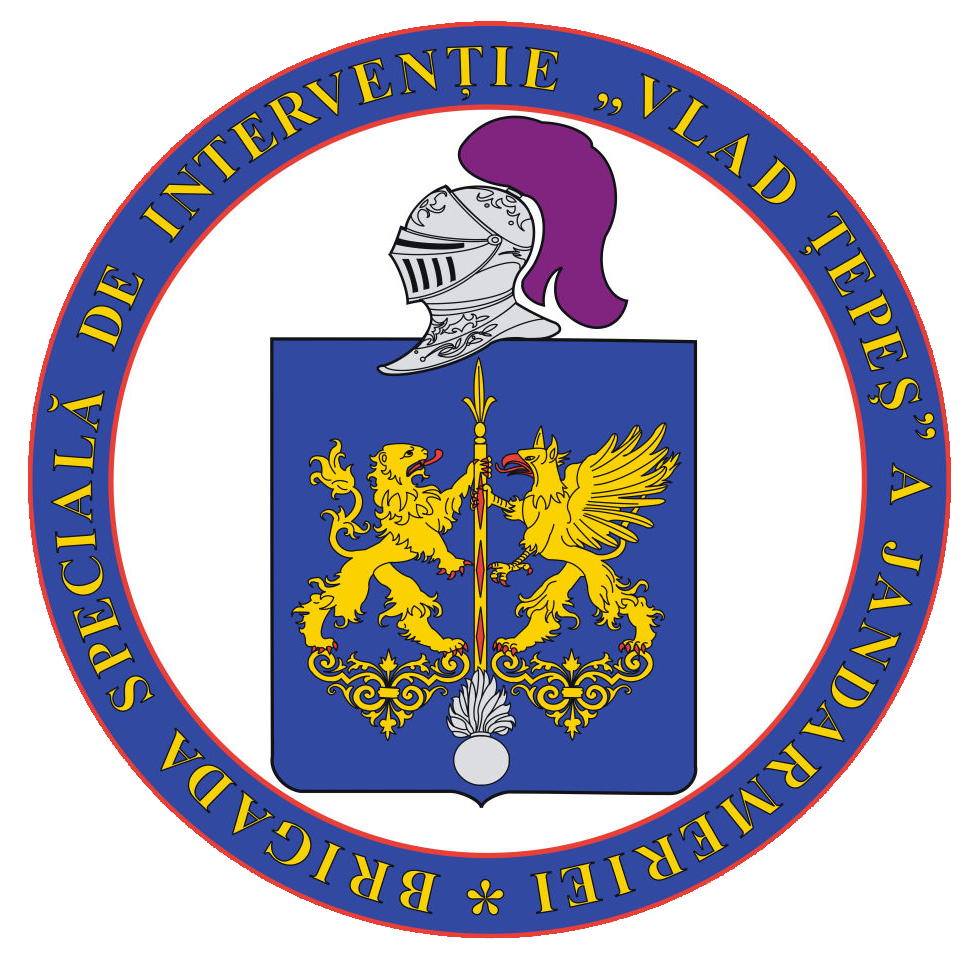
- Coat of Arms of the Unit
- Active: 1999–present
- Country: Romania
- Branch: Romanian Gendarmerie
- Type: Police tactical unit
- Role: Counterterrorism, only at the request of the Romanian Intelligence Service; Riot control
- Size: Brigade
- Garrison/HQ: Bucharest
- Patron: Vlad Țepeș
- Website: https://www.brigadaspeciala.ro

Commanders
- Current commander: Brigadier general Nicolae-Aurelian Costache

Brigada Specială de Intervenție a Jandarmeriei (Gendarmerie Special Intervention Brigade, BSIJ) is a police tactical unit of the Romanian Gendarmerie that specialized in anti-irregular military, apprehension of armed and dangerous criminals, ensuring public order, fighting organized crime, operating in difficult to access terrain, search and rescue efforts for disaster victims, and tactical special operations.

The unit carries the name "Vlad Țepeș" after the Wallachian ruler, Vlad the Impaler.

== History ==
After the fall of the communist regime in December 1989, two units were created by the Ministry of Internal Affairs with the task of ensuring public order. One was subordinated to the Romanian Police, while the other was subordinated to the Romanian Gendarmerie. Following the events of 1999, the Gendarmerie Special Intervention Brigade (Brigada Specială de Intervenție a Jandarmeriei - BSIJ) was formed through the Government Decision no. 77/1999 by transferring the Public Order and Peace Assurance Brigade of the Romanian Police to the Gendarmerie.

The BSIJ officially received the honorary name "Vlad Țepeș" in 2001, and in 2002 it merged with the 11th Mobile Gendarmerie Brigade under the name "Special Intervention Brigade "Vlad Țepeș" of the Gendarmerie" (Brigada Specială de Intervenție "Vlad Țepeș" a Jandarmeriei).

Since 2011, the Brigade is part of the ATLAS Network of police tactical units of the European Union. The unit received its battle flag on 11 February 2014.

== Role ==
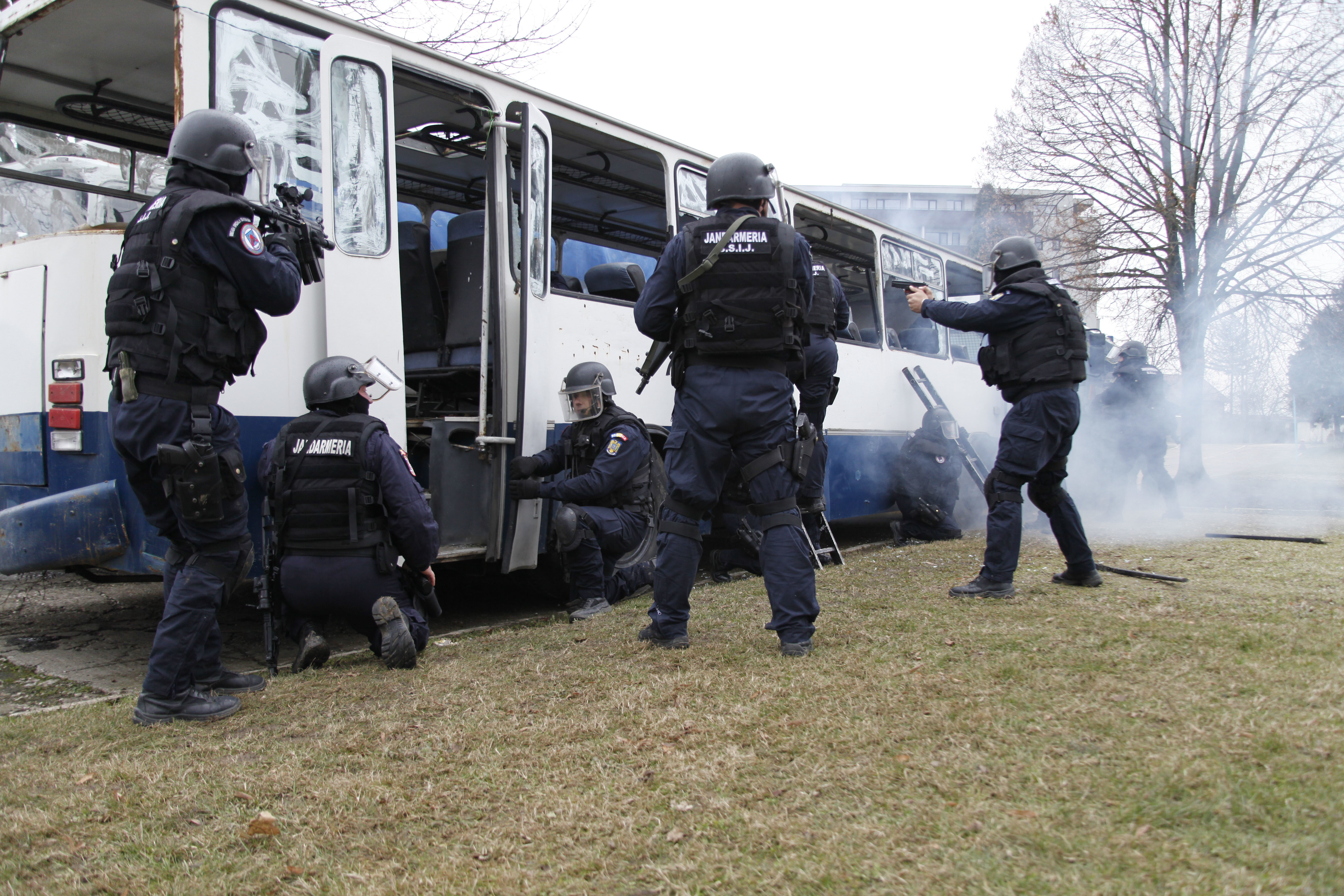
Romanian BSIJ officers demonstrate room-clearing and close-quarter battle techniques

In 2005, the BSIJ became the specialized military structure of the Ministry of Internal Affairs with the role of combating terrorism (only at the request of the Romanian Intelligence Service) and crime, ensuring public order, and fulfilling international missions following the commitments assumed by the state. The Brigade has various specialized personnel including divers, paratroopers, and pyrotechnicians. The BSIJ acts in cooperation with all other structures of the Romanian Ministries in order to combat organized crime networks for human trafficking, drug trafficking, and cybercrime. It also has the task of implementing the warrants issued by judicial bodies.

At the request of the Romanian Intelligence Service, the BSIJ can act to protect official delegations, and some high Romanian or foreign dignitaries while they are on the territory of the country. The unit can also intervene in rescue operations in case of natural disasters such as floods or heavy snowfalls. To accomplish its missions, the BSIJ often cooperates with the General Inspectorate of Aviation.

== Organization ==
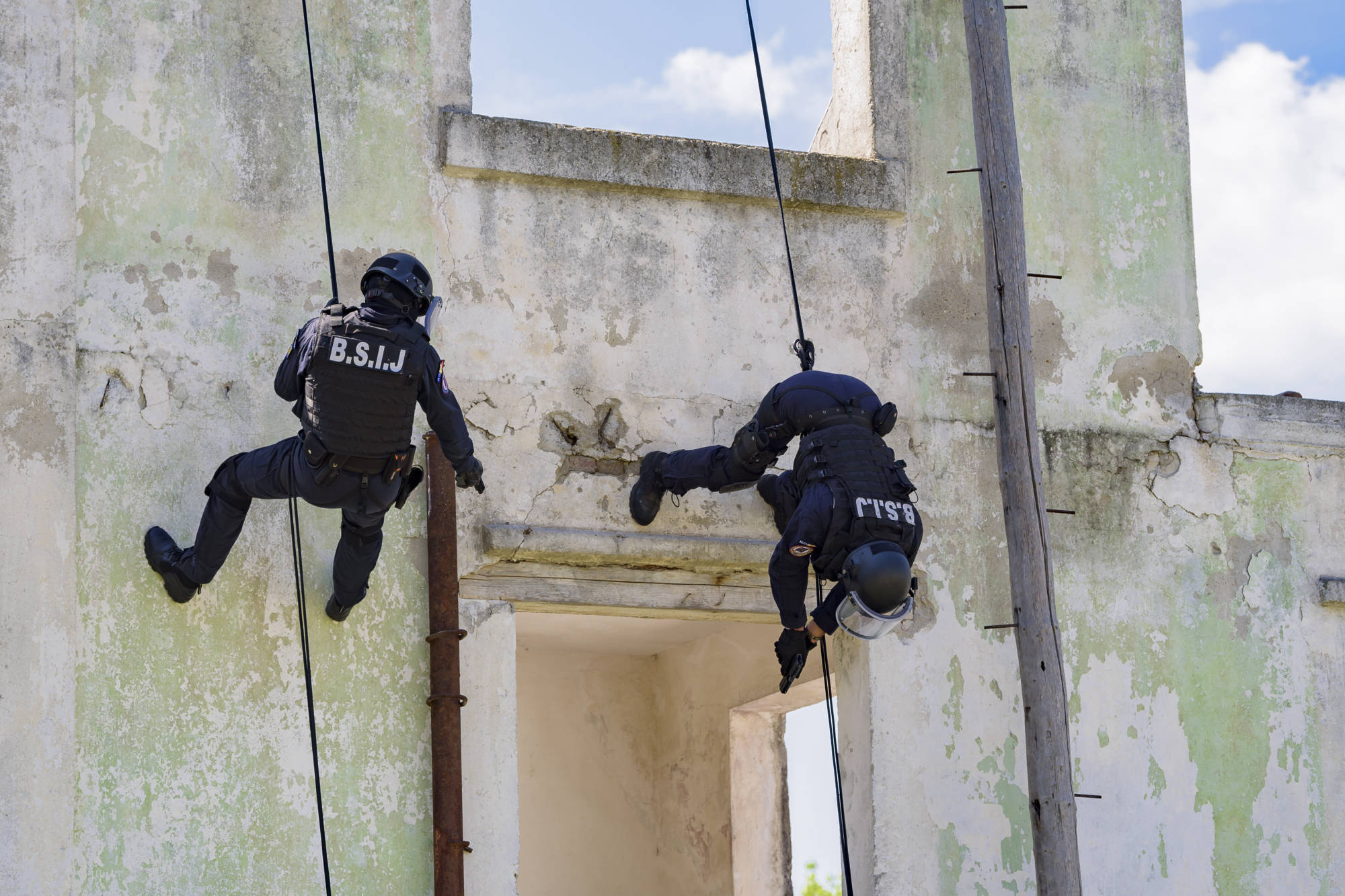
BSIJ soldiers training in the kill house.

The Brigade is divided into four units:

- COMANDAMENT (COMMAND) - The structure that ensures the organization, command, control, and coordination of the fulfillment of the attributions that fall within the competence of the Special Intervention Brigade of the Gendarmerie. It consists of the General Staff as a flexible, dynamic, and mobile structure designed for the integrated operational coordination in the field of forces and logistical financial support structures to ensure the material, technical and financial support of the operational structures.
- Batalionul 1 Jandarmi Special Intervenție Antiteroristă, Acțiuni Speciale și Protecție (1st Gendarmes Battalion Special Counterterrorism Intervention, Special Actions, and Protection) - It is the operative structure within the Special Gendarmerie Intervention Brigade consisting of specialized military personnel, with special physical, psychological and technical skills, trained, to the highest standards, to intervene in a timely and effective manner in any environment (land, air, water) for fulfilling specific missions with a high degree of risk (counterterrorism intervention, special actions, preventing and combating acts of terrorism).
- Batalionul 2 Jandarmi Special Intervenție (2nd Gendarmes Battalion Special Intervention) - It is the operative structure of the Special Gendarmerie Intervention Brigade specialized in crisis management in the field of public order, ensuring public order and peace during the visits of official delegations and dignitaries, Romanians and foreigners, ensuring public order and peace during public events with high risk, in which the large public participates, the rescue-evacuation of persons, the intervention for the restoration of public order in case it has been seriously disturbed and riot police.
- Batalionul 3 Jandarmi Special de Intervenție, Acțiuni Speciale și Protecție (3rd Battalion Special Intervention, Special Actions, and Protection Gendarmes) - As a result of the high dynamics of the missions entrusted to the Special Brigade, the need arose for a structural projection that would meet the operational needs. In this context, in 2019, the 3rd Special Gendarmes Battalion for Intervention, Special Actions, and Protection was created. The selection of specialists for the 3rd Battalion Special Gendarmes for Intervention, Special Actions, and Protection is a very rigorous one and includes elements that can test the upper limits of the fighters, from a physical and mental point of view. The fighters' further training is focused on the execution of the main categories of missions and specialization in the pyrotechnic and sniper fields, specific to the unit. Battalion 3 fighters are trained to act punctually, in small teams, with a high level of operational autonomy, in missions with a high degree of complexity. The equipment and armament of the 3rd Battalion are adapted to the missions performed and are meant to confer a highly flexible response capacity.

== Equipment ==
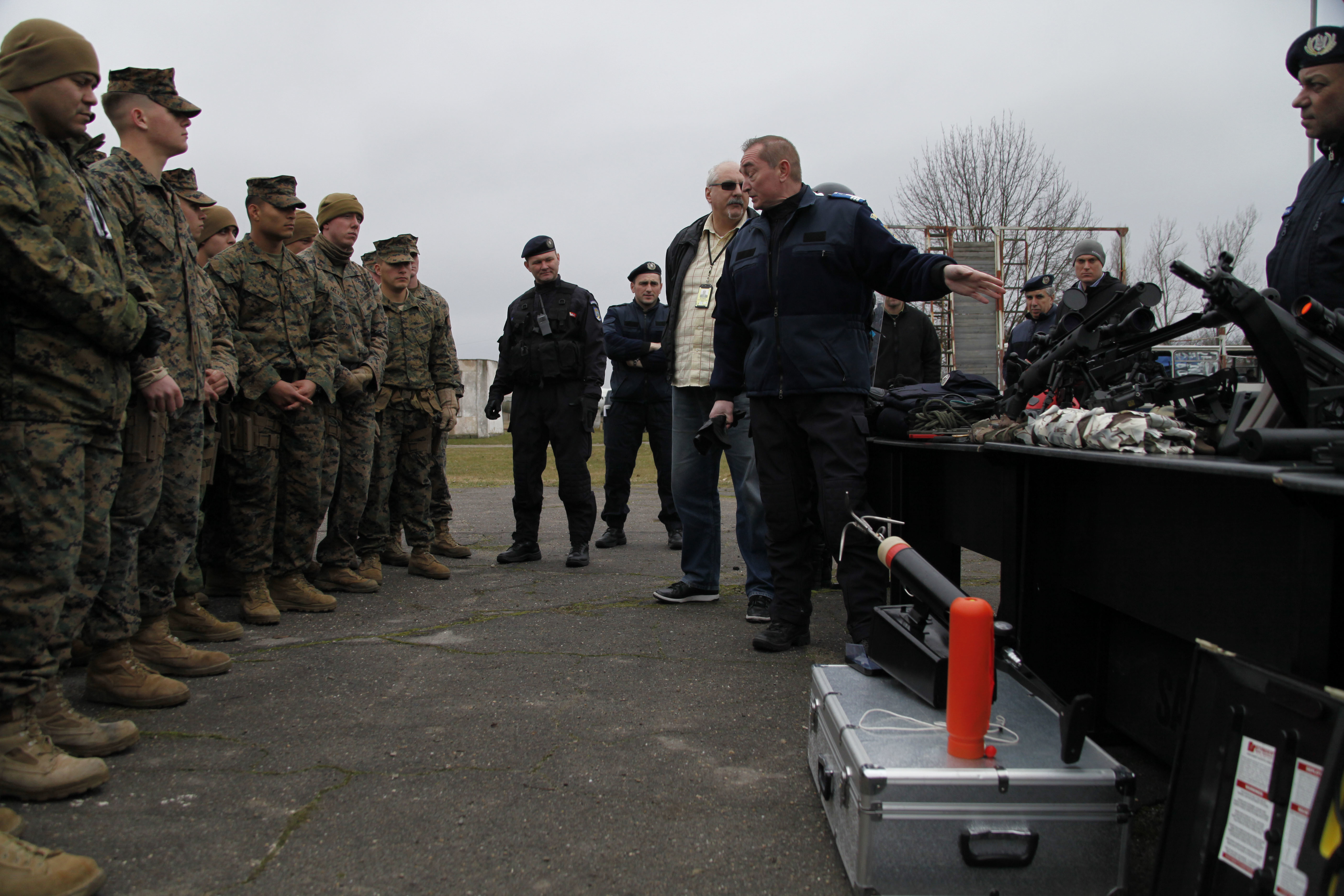
The deputy commander of the Special Intervention Brigade presents equipment used by local law enforcement personnel to US Marines during bilateral training exercises in 2015

The Special Intervention Brigade is equipped with the following:

=== Firearms ===
Model	Image	Caliber
Pistols
CZ P-07		9×19mm
CZ P-09		9×19mm
Glock		9×19mm
Heckler & Koch USP		9×19mm
SIG P226		9×19mm
SIG Pro		9×19mm
Submachine guns
Brügger & Thomet MP9		9×19mm
CZ Scorpion Evo 3		9×19mm
Heckler & Koch MP5		9×19mm
RATMIL model 96		9×19mm
Shotguns
Hatsan Escort MP-TS		12 gauge
Grenade launchers
Armă lansator Cal. 40 mm		40 mm
Assault rifles
CZ BREN 2		5.56×45mm
SIG SG 552		5.56×45mm
SIG SG 553		5.56×45mm
Sniper rifles
Accuracy International AXMC		.338 LM
Brügger & Thomet APR		7.62×51mm
Steyr HS .50		12.7×99mm

=== Armored Vehicles ===
Model	Type	Image
AM 7.0 M	Armored anti-riot vehicle	
Oshkosh Plasan SandCat	Light armored vehicle	

== See also ==
- GIGN, police tactical unit of the French National Gendarmerie
- GIS, special forces unit of the Italian Carabinieri
- SIAS, Romanian Police special unit
