= TVR Tower =

Office building

- Interactive map of the TVR Tower area

General information
- Status: Completed
- Type: Brutalist
- Location: Bucharest, Romania
- Coordinates: 44.46331°N 26.08916°E
- Construction started: 1966
- Opening: 1968
- Owner: Romanian Television

Height
- Roof: 50 m (160 ft)

Technical details
- Floor count: 13
- Floor area: 11,000 m^{2} (120,000 sq ft)

TVR Tower (Romanian: Turnul Televiziunii Române) is an office building located in the city of Bucharest, Romania. It stands at a height of 50 meters and has 13 floors, with a total surface area of 11,000 m^{2}. The building is owned by the Romanian Television, which uses the antenna on the roof of the building to transmit video signal to the surrounding area. Construction of the building began in 1966 and was completed in 1968.
