= Virgil Măgureanu =

Romanian sociologist

Professor at the Ștefan Gheorghiu Academy
- In office 1969–1989

Member of CFSN and CPUN
- In office December 1989 – March 1990

Director of the SRI
- In office 26 March 1990 – 25 April 1997
- Succeeded by: Costin Georgescu

Personal details
- Born: Virgil (Imre) Asztalos; March 19, 1941 (age 85) Hadad, Szatmár County, Hungary
- Citizenship: Romanian (after 1944), Hungarian (1941-1944)
- Party: Romanian Communist Party; National Salvation Front; Democratic Agrarian Party of Romania; Romanian National Party
- Spouse: Mariana
- Children: Anca; Marian Măgureanu
- Education: University of Bucharest
- Occupation: Sociology politician
- Profession: Sociology, Captain of Securitate

Virgil Măgureanu, (Romanian pronunciation: [virˈd͡ʒil məɡuˈre̯anu]; born March 19, 1941, as Imre Asztalos) is a Romanian sociologist that was the head of the main intelligence service of Romania, Serviciul Român de Informații, or SRI (Romanian Intelligence Service) between March 26, 1990, and April 25, 1997 (when he resigned following a disclosure about his personal wealth, made at television while Virgil Măgureanu was among the invited people).

Măgureanu was one of the members of the Military Tribunal that sentenced to death both Nicolae Ceaușescu and his wife, Elena on December 25, the Christmas Day of 1989, the former Communist leaders of Romania.

According to the Central Intelligence Agency, Măgureanu was named to the post primarily on the basis of his "dissident" status within Ceaușescu's regime, based on his teachings at the communist party's social science academy during the 1980s. Initially Măgureanu managed to hide his membership in the Securitate from the post-communist authorities, but his affiliation was exposed by the press years later.

Western intelligence services discovered that immediately after his appointment, in April 1990, Măgureanu met secretly with KGB Chief Evghenii Primakov without informing the political authorities in Romania. Măgureanu's KGB contacts remained unknown to the Romanian Presidency and Governments until 2003, when the Western services that monitored those contacts informed Bucharest.

According to the CIA, Măgureanu's activities, and the fact that the CIA chief in Bucharest during 1990–92, Harold James Nicholson was later exposed as a Soviet agent, followed by the 1994 arrest of Aldrich Ames, effectively rendered closer intelligence relations between Romania and the West impossible during the first half of the 1990s.

Virgil Măgureanu was deposed as head of SRI in 1997, at the beginning of Emil Constantinescu's mandate as President of Romania.

== Controversies ==
He was suspected of being the eminence grise in the big corruption scandals - Eurocolumna, the oil business, Cigarette I and Cigarette II, Bastos, Porcelain, Megapower and the Villa de la Giurtelec.
