= Romanian Intelligence Service =

Government agency

- Serviciul Român de Informații
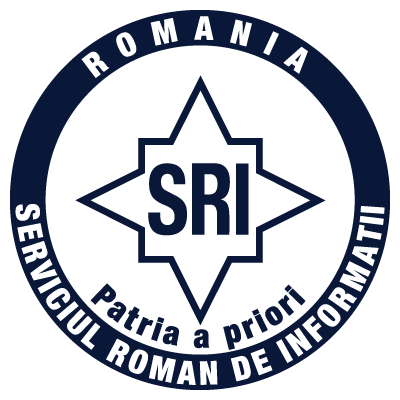

Agency overview
- Formed: 26 March 1990
- Preceding agency: Securitate
- Headquarters: Bd. Libertății nr. 14D, sector 5, Bucharest
- Employees: Classified
- Annual budget: EUR 541 million (2020)
- Agency executives: General Răzvan Ionescu, Acting Director; Lieutenant General Cristian Bizadea, Deputy Director; Lieutenant General Adrian Ciocîrlan, Deputy Director; Lieutenant General Gheorghe-Stancu Răducu, Deputy Director
- Website: www.sri.ro

The Romanian Intelligence Service (Romanian: Serviciul Român de Informații, SRI) is Romania's main domestic intelligence service. Its role is to gather information relevant to national security and hand it over to relevant institutions, such as Romanian Government, presidency and law enforcement departments and agencies. The service gathers intelligence by such means as signals intelligence (SIGINT), open-source intelligence (OSINT) and human intelligence (HUMINT). It operates predominantly within Romanian territory but also outside national borders in collaboration with other states specifically to target cross-border threats.

== History ==
=== Previous intelligence services in Romania ===
In 1865, the Romanian General Staff (inspired by the French system) created the 2nd Section (Secția a II-a) to gather and analyze military intelligence. This marked a growing interest in centralising intelligence efforts spurring the creation of the General Safety Bureau in 1892 within the Ministry of the Interior with responsibilities pertaining to the safety of the state. However, despite ambitions, the various government entities and associated municipal governance structures were not set up in a way which allowed for national, collective intelligence services. Prior to 1905, Romania's regional police forces were dependent on the local politics and had no strategic continuity. The 1907 Peasants' Revolt highlighted critical gaps in oversight, specifically in the ability to ascertain with certainty the motives behind the revolt and whether any foreign elements were involved in the events.

In March 1908, the Bureau became the Police and General Safety Directorate. Among its responsibilities of leading judicial and law enforcement matters nationally, it would also occupy itself with gathering intelligence pertaining to events and offences with a political footprint. In a bid to correct the gaps of the past, police infrastructure was reorganised with regional brigades in each municipal capital. Funded centrally and with a focus on gathering information pertaining to the security of state borders, a key distinguishing feature was the complete independence from regional politics thereby ensuring a stable and organised entity. The intelligence gathering responsibilities were shared with the Prefect's Office of the Capital City Police and General Inspectorate of the Gendarmerie. In parallel with law enforcement developments, select intelligence and counter-intelligence units were being created by the Romanian Army with a remit of both at home and abroad.

Between 1914 and 1918 Romania faced unrest on several fronts including corruption, espionage and a unification war. The impact of recent reorganisation efforts should not be overlooked. The establishment of central entities for gathering, processing and sharing information critical to national security allowed the Romanian State to maintain its integrity in the face of more powerful states in central Europe and uncover German spies, some in positions of power within government and armed forces.

As of 1918, the State of Romania included 3 new provinces which brought their own challenges to national security considerations. New ethnic minority groups, now under the geographic territory of Romania, formed political and revolutionary groups causing further unrest. Simultaneously, there were significant political and social issues emerging in the aftermath of the first world war which would continue to overshadow national security decisions for decades to come. For this reason, national security became wholly focused on domestic issues and lost sight of foreign threats even though, it can be argued that espionage threats were increasing across Europe.

It is critical at this point to highlight that the geographic location of Romania was considered strategically advantageous for political, economic and military interests and coveted for its rich natural resources. For example, German and Anglo competing (and often in conflict) interests in expansion have often played out in Romanian territory. This hidden war gave rise to many espionage operations by France and the United Kingdom. Various publications in the years that followed which boasted of successful agents and their missions prompted the start of a new department of intelligence.

By 1925, after several years of efforts, Mihail Moruzov managed to convince the General Staff about the necessity of a secret service that uses civilian employees to gather intelligence of interest to the Romanian Army. Information sharing and collaboration across both intelligence and counterintelligence strengthened and included areas of focus such as politics, economy, minorities and counterespionage. The new service would also develop areas of surveillance, in particular of ethnic minority communities.

Moruzov's leadership of the Secret Service occurred during a time of turbulent socio-political developments, including the rise of the Iron Guard, the threat of Communism and the uncertain role of the Monarchy. His activities, which often included gathering compromising information about key political figures, drew the attention of Ion Antonescu who would become Head of State following the abdication and exile of King Carol II. In September 1940, Moruzov was arrested and put on trial.

Learning from the failings of the Secret Service under Moruzov, Antonescu relaunched the service in 1940 as the Special Service of Intelligence (Serviciul Special de Informații) with Eugen Cristescu as official director. The new service was under the direct authority of the Head of State thereby severing the influence of the army element however they would continue to collaborate on a more equal footing; it would also be funded by the Ministry of Defence and as such spending would be monitored accordingly. As World War II loomed, the activities of the S.S.I. began to attract negative attention from other elements of government, particularly the Ministry of Justice.

Though the political independence enjoyed during Moruzov was not wielded in a way which boosted national security, the alternative placed the service under the direct control of the government and would later be used against those who opposed government directives. Antonescu, in assuming power in September 1940 also allowed the Legionary Movement and by extension the Iron Guard access to the highest echelons of power. Further collaboration with German entities such as the Abwehr further galvanised the movement and those who opposed the regime were at increased risk.

Similarly, through the communist period (1947 to 1989), the service was used as an oppressive instrument against the anti-communists and people who opposed the government's official policies. The Securitate ("Security") was the political police that was involved in repressing dissent. During the Romanian Revolution of December 1989, soon after taking power, Ion Iliescu signed the decree which integrated the Securitate into the Ministry of Defense, thus bringing it under his control.

Iulian Vlad, the head of the Securitate, together with some of his deputies, were arrested on December 31, 1989; Iliescu named Gelu Voican Voiculescu as the new head of the Securitate. Voiculescu assured the Securitate agents that he does not intent to wage a war against individual Securitate officers and, by mid-January 1990, the Securitate officers continued their activity in their old headquarters. The press was informed (but not allowed to verify) that the equipment for tapping phones had been decommissioned.

=== Creation ===
The Romanian Intelligence Service was officially created on March 26, 1990, taking over the buildings, staff, equipment, and virtually everything that belonged to the Securitate. Its creation occurred only a few days following the ethnic clashes of Târgu Mureș, being quickly created through a decree. Its first director was Virgil Măgureanu. At that time, there were two other intelligence services: UM 0215 and the Foreign Intelligence Service.

=== Securitate archives ===
SRI inherited Securitate's archives and it has been accused of destroying parts of it or supplying sensitive parts to certain politicians.

On June 22, 1990, SRI officers unloaded a truck full of Securitate documents in a forest in Berevoești, Argeș County, after which they buried them with soil. The documents intended to be destroyed were discovered by locals and, a year later, a group of journalists began digging the decaying documents and the România liberă newspaper published several of them, including information on dissidents, being not only Securitate, but also of the newly created SRI. This led to the adoption of a law on state secrets, which banned publication of any SRI documents.

It was only in 2005 that the archives of the Securitate began to be transferred to an outside institution (CNSAS) with a first batch containing two-thirds of the total number of documents. The goal was to transfer all Securitate documents which "do not affect national security".

=== Involvement in the Mineriad ===
The extent of the involvement of the Romanian Intelligence Service in the violent repression of the 1990 anti-government protests has been a matter of debate. On June 12, 1990, the government decided that the Police and Army, in collaboration with the Intelligence Service, evacuate the protesters of University Square. During the violence that followed, the protesters attacked the headquarters of the Romanian Intelligence Service with rocks and Molotov cocktails.

The following days, miners brought by the government from the Jiu Valley violently repressed the protesters (killing several people and wounding thousands) and destroyed the opposition parties' headquarters. According to a letter to President Iliescu drafted by then-Prime Minister Petre Roman, the whole repression was organized by the secret services under the leadership of Virgil Măgureanu using the network of the Securitate. This view is supported by military prosecutor Dan Voinea, who said that all the miner groups were escorted by police and SRI agents who led them to the headquarters of parties and NGOs.

During the 2000s, Virgil Măgureanu, the head of the SRI at the time, has been investigated by prosecutors (together with other leaders including President Ion Iliescu) for several counts including genocide and torture, however they decided in 2009 not to charge him with any crime.

=== Phone tapping ===
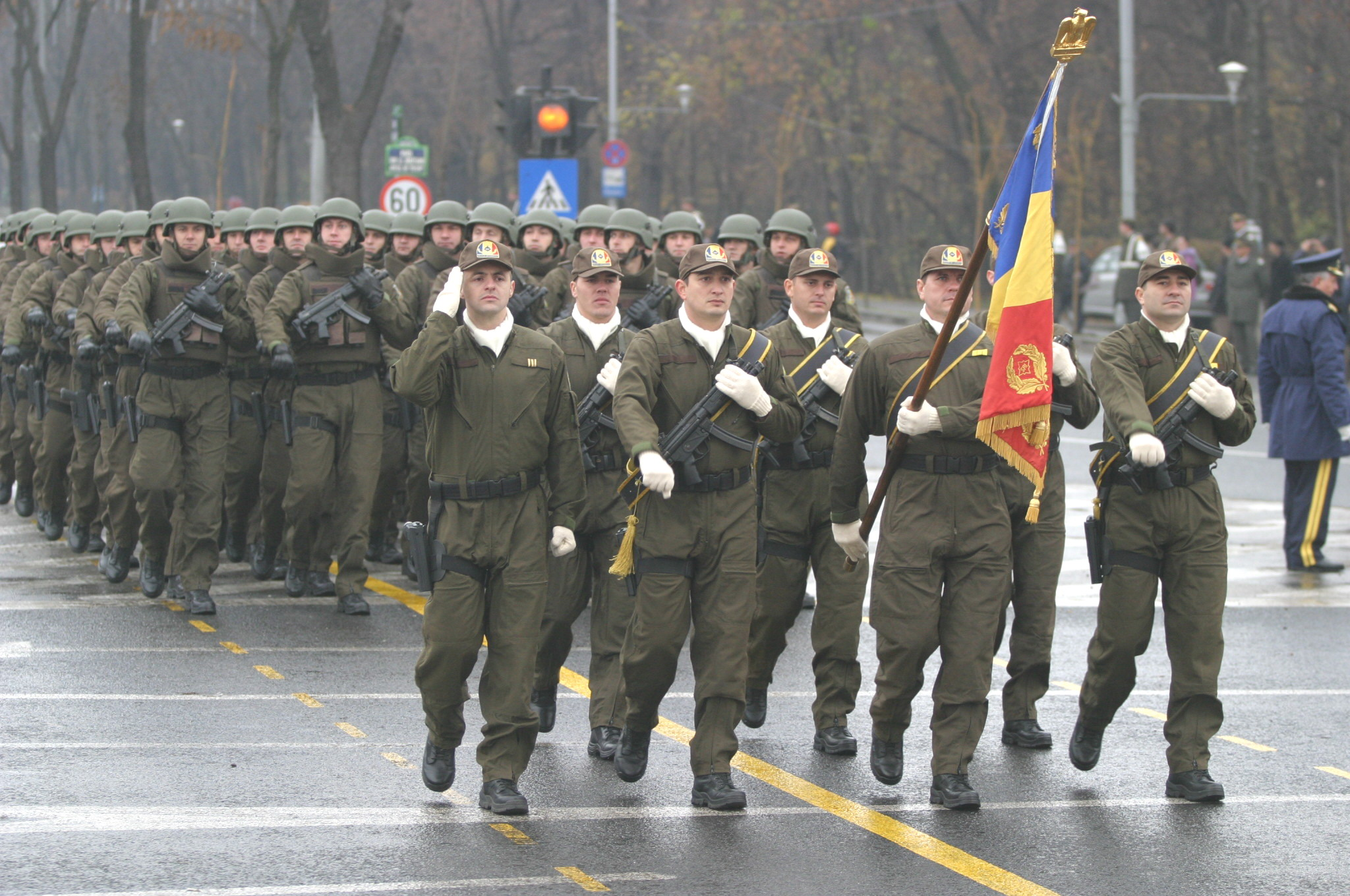
A Counter-Terrorism Battalion of the SRI on parade in 2008.

In 1996, a former SRI employee, Constantin Bucur was the whistleblower who alerted the media that the Romanian Intelligence Service was performing illegal phone tappings of politicians, journalists and other public figures. Bucur was convicted for revealing top secret information, but he won a trial against the Romanian state after appealing at the European Court of Human Rights.

Mircea Toma, one of the journalists whose phone had been tapped also sued the Romanian state for wiretapping and preserving private conversations with his daughter, Sorana. He also won a compensation the disrespect of the Article 8 of the European Convention on Human Rights. The Romanian Intelligence Service refused to collaborate with the European Court of Human Rights, arguing that its documents are state secrets.

The president of the Group of Political Investigations (a Romanian organization that independently monitors the activity of state agencies), Mugur Ciuvică, has stated that he has evidence of ongoing illegal phone tappings.

According to Ilie Botoș, a former Attorney General of Romania, between 1991 and 2003, the phones of 20,000 people have been tapped. Between 1991 and 2002, a number of 14,000 authorizations were given by the government for national security-related issues. Between 1996 and 2003, further 5,500 authorizations were given related to organized and white-collar crime; out of these 5,500 suspects, only 238 were convicted. For the year 2005, a number of 6370 phones belonging to 2373 people were tapped, the average tapping being of 220 days.

In 2006, a new illegal wiretapping scandal erupted after transcripts of businessman Dinu Patriciu's phone discussions with his associates were leaked to the press. Patriciu sued the Intelligence Service and won a compensation of 50,000 lei in 2011. A further case of potentially illegal wiretappings is the one of European Court of Human Rights judge Corneliu Bîrsan, whose wiretappings under the guise of "national security" are now being investigated by a parliamentary commission created by the Romanian Senate on April 8, 2013.

=== Relationship with the press ===
The Romanian Intelligence Service had an uneasy relationship with the press, which it monitored, infiltrated and accused of being a national security liability. In 2010, "the press" has been included in the list of national vulnerabilities in the "National Strategy for the Defence of the Country".

An early controversy occurred in 1996, when Tana Ardeleanu (a journalist for Ziua who had published some articles about President Ion Iliescu) had been shadowed by SRI agents. Amid press anger, SRI director Virgil Măgureanu admitted that SRI agents followed Ardeleanu and argued that the surveillance was a "mistake" and that the agents thought they were following two suspected spies.

The existence of infiltrated SRI agents in the press has been publicly known since 2006, when the press officer of SRI claimed that the Service has always had moles in the Romanian press arguing that it's not illegal. This claim has been quite controversial, as, according to Cristian Tudor Popescu, journalists are not a threat to national security and, according to historian Marius Oprea, this leads to suspicions about whether the SRI has political police activities.

The Jurnalul Național newspaper fired its editor-in-chief, Valentin Zaschievici, in August 2012, accusing him of being an infiltrated SRI agent, following the leak of some SRI documents by Cotidianul. The Romanian Intelligence Service admitted that the documents were indeed genuine, but it claimed that their agent was only monitoring the leaking of secret documents to the press.

In 2013, George Maior, the Director of the Service, accused the press of organizing an attack campaign against the Romanian Intelligence Service, giving as example the investigations over the illegal CIA prisons in Bucharest (Bright Light), which he argued that is exposing Romania to terrorist attacks.

=== Known operations ===
On March 28, 2005, three Romanian journalists were kidnapped in Iraq by unknown abductors (later described as members of the Muadh ibn Jabal Brigades) in Baghdad's al-Mansour district. A few weeks after being kidnapped, the terrorists broadcast a tape on Al-Jazeera stating that they would kill the journalists if Romania did not withdraw its 860 troops from Iraq. However, due to efforts of the Romanian intelligence community and the collaboration between several intelligence agencies, the group were freed on May 23, 2005, when they were placed in the hands of the Romanian Embassy in Baghdad. It is believed that Florian Coldea (the former deputy director of the SRI) coordinated the rescue operation.

On February 28, 2008, the Romanian counter-intelligence officers and Organized Crime and Terrorism Division of the Romanian Interior Ministry arrested a Bulgarian military attaché, Petar Marinov Zikolov, and a Romanian NCO, Floricel Achim. They have been prosecuted with charges of espionage. It is believed that the leaked information might have been sent to Russia or Ukraine. The Bulgarians have denied any connection with Zikolov. This has been one of the few espionage cases that have received media attention.

== Programs ==
=== Integrated Information System ===
The Integrated Information System (Romanian: Sistemul Informatic Integrat, SII) is a computing system that allows SRI to aggregate data from various governmental agencies. It was created in 2003 under the initiative of SRI director Radu Timofte, who sent a request to the Supreme Council of National Defence (CSAT) led by President Ion Iliescu. The system has its activities based on secret laws that were not published in Monitorul Oficial. The only public information on the system is found in the government decision that followed, which mandated all state institutions to give the system all the information they have. The public law does not include any kind of control mechanisms or ways to prevent abuses.

As such, all information on Romanian and foreign citizens that the state has (such as dates of entering/exiting the country, what car one owns, what phone numbers or phone metadata or what taxes you paid) is fed into the system. The names of the members of the Integrated Information System council and its headquarters are a state secret.

Civil rights NGO APADOR-CH (Human Rights Defense Association of Romania) contested in justice the way it worked, arguing that such a government institution couldn't have been legally created by the way of secret laws and that it broke the Article 8 of the European Convention on Human Rights. The NGO lost the trial.

In 2016, the SRI obtained a €25 million in financing from the European Union for a project called SII Analytics. The project is financed by the E-government program of the EU, but parts of it such as interception of communications and facial recognition show that one of the goals is surveillance. The project includes a "good behavior" file for each citizen, which aggregates data from all government agencies. APADOR-CH argued that these citizen files can be used for nefarious purposes against some citizens (MPs, judges, prosecutors, businessmen, etc.).

=== National Alert System ===
The National Alert System (Sistemul Național de Alertă Teroristă in Romanian) is the Romanian terrorist barometer. SNA is a system that, based on existing intelligence from SRI, SIE and possibly other agencies, ranks the risk of a terrorist attack on Romanian territory. The system is color based (green-low to red-imminent). The color can be changed (and therefore security measures increased) with the prior approval of the executive of SRI.

Currently, SNA is colored blue-cautious; this means that the intelligence on hand suggests there is a relatively low risk of a terrorist attack.

The color has only been changed once (to yellow-moderate) at the 2008 NATO Bucharest summit.

== Structure ==
The Romanian Intelligence Service is made up of multiple departments and units including:

- Director
  - Director's Cabinet
  - General Secretariat
    - First Deputy Director
      - Operations and Strategic Innovation Department
        - Institute for Advanced Technologies (ITA)
    - Deputy Director
      - Technical Capabilities Department
        - National Cyberint Center
    - Deputy Director
      - Analysis and Cooperation Department
    - Deputy Director
      - Financial Directorate
      - Logistics Department
    - Human Resources Department
    - Applied Psychology Department
    - Education Department
      - "Mihai Viteazul" National Intelligence Academy (MVNIA)
        - National Institute of Intelligence Studies (INSI)
        - National Centre for Modelling and Simulation in Intelligence (CNMSI)
    - Legal Assistance Department
    - Audit Department
    - Security Department
      - General Directorate of Internal Security

== Resources ==
=== Personnel ===
The Romanian Intelligence Service is a militarized institution, although it is not a part of the Romanian Armed Forces. The hierarchy from the service is defined by military ranks. The highest ranking employee has the rank of general officer (with four stars). Civilian personnel is composed mostly of accountants, IT and law specialists. The number of employees is classified. However, rumors about the number of employees exists. The newspaper Adevărul was able to find in 2006 an estimate of 12,000 agents, a figure confirmed by former SIE director Cătălin Harnagea. According to former DIE general Ion Mihai Pacepa, this figure is double the number of agents of the similar service of France (which has a population three times larger than Romania's) and larger than Germany's secret services, Pacepa noting the unusual size of Romania's secret services, leading to claims that Ceaușescu's police state has been incompletely dismantled and that the number of officers has actually increased since 1989. In an interview in Jurnalul Național from 2018, George Maior denied the numbers Harnagea claimed, saying that the SRI has an estimated number of 3,000 operative employees. According to Maior, the average salary in the service is 2,500 Lei (€560), a salary above the average income in Romania.

To become an employee of the SRI, a person has to fulfill several conditions, including having Romanian citizenship, matching the age criteria, clean criminal record and no serious medical conditions. If so, the person is allowed in the recruitment process. This process consists of background checks, medical exams, aptitude tests, personality tests, physical fitness tests and a paper exam (for example, a general knowledge test).

The main gate to enter the intelligence service is the National Intelligence Academy (Academia Națională de Informații Mihai Viteazul) from Bucharest.

=== The Anti-Terrorist Brigade ===
The Anti-Terrorist Brigade (Brigada Antiteroristă), also known as BAT, is SRI's special actions unit and the main anti-terrorist unit from Romania. Created during the mid 1970s (as a response to the 1972 Munich Massacre) under the name of ARTA, the unit has changed its name later into The Special Anti-Terrorist Unit (USLA - Unitatea Specială de Luptă Antiteroristă).

Eight USLA members were killed during the Romanian Revolution in December 1989.

The size of the brigade is classified, but it is known that the unit has in ranks the best operatives from the Romanian military and law enforcement sector. Most of them are athletes, with excellent results in sports such as boxing, karate, rugby, judo, and other combat sports.

Also, the brigade is providing security on all important airports from Romania and members of the brigade are working as air marshals on all Romanian flights.

=== Budget ===
2008	2009	2010	2011	2012	2013	2014	2015	2016
1,039 million lei	1,032 million lei	957 million lei	907 million lei	989 million lei	1,043 million lei	1,100 million lei	1,392 million lei / 1554 million lei (after budget revision)	1,850 million lei

Budget in million lei
