= UM 0215 =

UM 0215 (Military Unit 0215, colloquially known as Doi și-un sfert, "Two and a quarter," or "Quarter past two") was a Romanian intelligence agency in the 1990s that was built upon the Bucharest branch of the Socialist Republic of Romania's Securitate. Its main purpose was to subvert the opposition, particularly during the Golaniad mass protests in Bucharest. The agency was also involved in the violent interventions against the protesters (the Mineriad).

== Creation ==
Created in February 1990 with President Ion Iliescu's approval, it was made up of Securitate officers who had been placed in reserve following the Romanian Revolution of 1989.

== Activities ==
The agency received criticism from the media, as well as from Western governments and NGOs and journalists, for having ex-Securitate members and for its modus operandi. It collected information on politicians, journalists and trade union leaders, as well as Romanians abroad and foreigners in Romania. It was accused of being a political police.

== Dissolution ==
In 1998, it was disbanded and, following background checks from a governmental commission, some of its agents were taken over by the newly created criminal intelligence agency, Direcția Generală de Informații și Protecție Internă. Where UM 0215 had 1,440 staff members, the new agency had a sharply reduced 150 staff members.

The proposal to disband it completely was not taken into consideration because some feared that the agents would join the Greater Romania Party.
