= Direcția Generală de Protecție Internă =

Romanian government body

General Directorate for Internal Security Direcția Generală de Protecție Internă
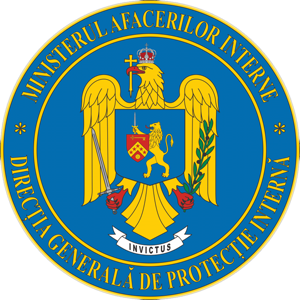
- Common name: Doi și-un sfert ("Two and a quarter")
- Abbreviation: DGPI

Agency overview
- Formed: 2003

Jurisdictional structure
- National agency (Operations jurisdiction): Romania
- Operations jurisdiction: Romania
- Legal jurisdiction: As per operations jurisdiction

Operational structure
- Headquarters: Bucharest
- Agency executive: Luca Banaseanu Nicolae, Director general
- Parent agency: Ministry of Internal Affairs

Website
- www.dgpi.ro

Direcția Generală de Protecție Internă (General Directorate for Internal Protection, DGPI) is the criminal intelligence agency of the Romanian Ministry of Internal Affairs. It was created following the disbanding of UM 0215.

The objective of the General Directorate for Internal Protection is to know the risks, threats and vulnerabilities within the remit of the Ministry of Internal Affairs to ensure an effective approach and the integration of an operational situation, in order to enforce laws and uphold the rule of law and democracy.

== Number of Employees ==
In November 2003, the DGPI had 2,400 employees.

In 2006 the number of DGPI employees was 2,000 and in 2009 it reached 3,200.

In 2016, before the dissolution, DGPI had 1800 employees.

== Organization ==
The county sections of the DGPI are called the Information and Internal Protection Service (SIPI).

== Leadership ==
- August 2016 - present — Mihai Mărculescu

== See also ==
- Foreign Intelligence Service (Romania) (SIE)
- Serviciul de Telecomunicații Speciale (STS)
