= Foreign Intelligence Service (Romania) =

Romanian foreign intelligence service

- Serviciul de Informații Externe
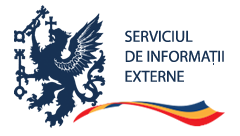

Agency overview
- Formed: 8 February 1990
- Preceding agency: DIE (Directia Informatii Externe)
- Headquarters: Bucharest
- Employees: Classified
- Annual budget: EUR 68 million (2020)
- Agency executive: Gabriel Vlase, Director
- Website: www.sie.ro

The Foreign Intelligence Service (Romanian: Serviciul de Informații Externe, SIE) is, under Law no. 1/1998, "the state body specialized in foreign intelligence concerning the national security and the safeguarding of Romania and its interests".

The SIE carries on its activity in keeping with the Constitution of Romania, the laws of the country, the Decisions of the Country's Supreme Defense Council (CSAT), and military regulations. The activity of the service has the character of a state secret. The sources of intelligence, the ways and means its mission is carried out cannot be disclosed to anyone, under whatever circumstances. The disclosure, in any way, of information and intelligence that make the object of activity of the Foreign Intelligence Service is forbidden, and punishable as laid down in the law.

The Foreign Intelligence Service is authorized, under the law, to use specific methods, develop and own appropriate means for obtaining, checking, assessing, turning to account, storing and protecting intelligence information relating to national security. It also has the right, in the conditions established under the law, to ask for and obtain from the Romanian public authorities, companies, other legal entities, as well as from individuals, intelligence, information, or documents needed in accomplishing its missions.

== History ==
By Decree no. 111/8 February 1990 issued by the Committee of the National Salvation Front, the Foreign Intelligence Centre (Centrul de Informații Externe (CIE)) was confirmed as an institution of the Romanian state, mandated to carry out its activity in the field of foreign intelligence. Law no. 39/13 December 1990 gave an identity to the Foreign Intelligence Service, as this regulatory act stipulates for the first time the name of the SIE, as a CSAT member.

The legal framework that regulates the activity of the SIE is based on Law no. 51/1991 on national security, Law no. 415/2002 on the organization and functioning of the CSAT, Law no. 182/2002 on the protection of classified information, and Law no. 1/6 January 1998 on the organization and functioning of the Foreign Intelligence Service, completed by the Emergency Ordinance (OUG) no. 154 on 21 November 2001.

== Cooperation with the other intelligence services in Romania ==
The SIE has developed, since 1991, a close cooperation with similar institutions in several countries, having beneficial effects on safeguarding the national security. In keeping with national regulations, the Romanian intelligence services frequently carry out joint actions aimed at preventing and countering events that might prejudice Romania's national security.

The cooperation between the SIE and other structures with responsibilities in the field of national security is achieved through operational intelligence exchanges on matters of common interest, as well as in other aspects or working ways that contribute to ensuring national security. This process is carried out according to certain cooperation protocols negotiated between the parties, which stipulate the obligation of immediately informing each other on aspects regarding national security.

== Communication with the civil society and the media ==
The relation of the Foreign Intelligence Service with the civil society and the media is managed by a special structure in its organizational chart. This structure coordinates at the same time, in keeping with its responsibilities, the institutional relations of SIE with the Parliament, the Presidential Administration, the Government and the governmental organizations, as well as with the other structures in the central public administration.

In communicating with the civil society and the media, the SIE strikes a necessary balance between the citizen's right to be informed in conditions of transparency and the obligation to keep secret the information that, under the law, cannot be disclosed. This inevitably leads to a range of restrictions entailed by the specificity of the work that can otherwise be found in all the intelligence services in the democratic states.

== Oversight ==
Oversight via Consiliul Suprem de Apărare a Ţării (CSAT). The CSAT approves the organisational structure, the staff in peacetime or during mobilization, the functioning regulation, and the tasks of the Foreign Intelligence Service. Every year, or whenever the circumstances make it necessary, the SIE Director submits to the CSAT reports on the way the Service accomplishes its missions.

Control upon the activities of the SIE is exercised by the Parliament of Romania, via a special Parliamentary Committee, tasked with observing the confidentiality and the means and sources of intelligence collection. The special committee is made up of three deputies and two senators, elected from among the Committees for Defence, Public Order and National Security of the two Chambers. Parliamentary oversight aims to check whether the activity of the Foreign Intelligence Service is consistent with the Constitution of Romania and the policies of the Romanian state. While exercising the prerogatives incumbent upon it, the Commission demands from the SIE, through its director, papers, information, and intelligence, and may conduct hearings of individuals connected to the issues being analysed. The Foreign Intelligence Service is bound to meet, in due time, the Committee's requests and allow the hearing of the respective persons, with prior approval by the SIE Director.

Financially, the activities of the Foreign Intelligence Service are audited by the Ministry of Public Finances, which exercises a delegated pre-emptive financial verification, and the Audit Office, through its follow-on control over the execution of the revenue and expenses budgets. The Public Ministry also gives clearances on and authorizes the legality of some activities conducted with a view towards gathering intelligence.

== Surveillance of private persons and the press ==
On 4 February 2015, Mugur Stroe (a former chief of SIE), declared that the Service possessed compromising pictures of TV presenters and press writers. This statement was made in the context of accusations of corruption against the Romanian Intelligence Service.
