= Sălăuța =

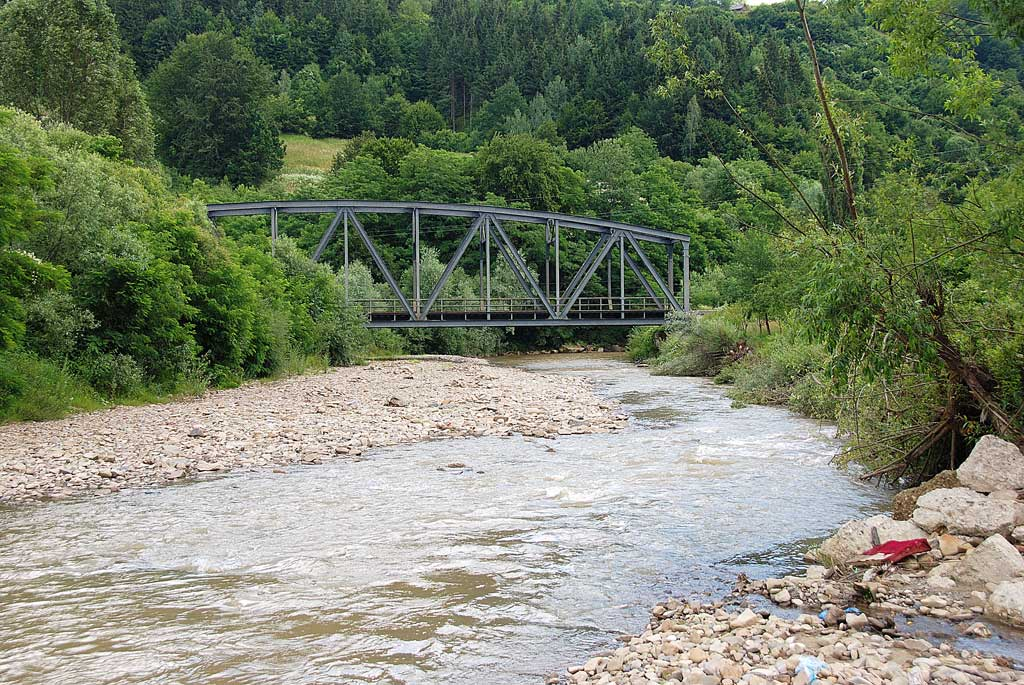

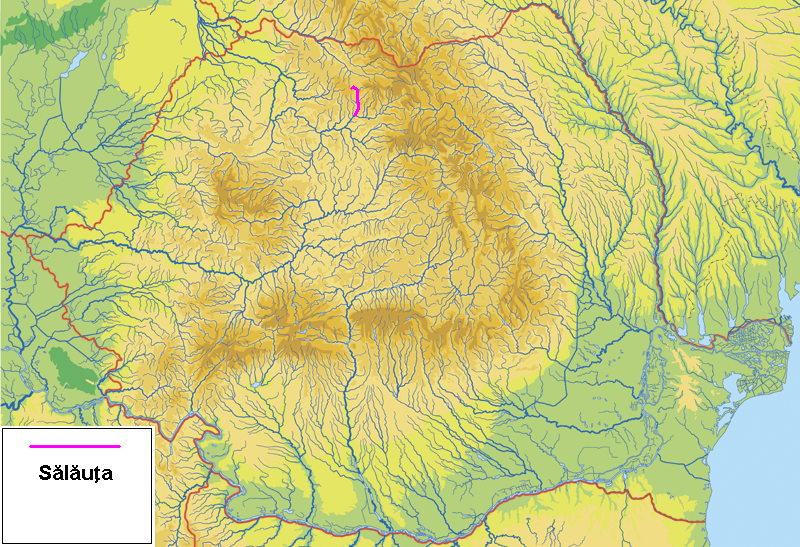

- Location within Romania

Location
- Country: Romania
- Counties: Bistrița-Năsăud County
- Villages: Romuli, Telciu, Coșbuc, Salva

Physical characteristics
- Mouth: Someșul Mare
  - location: Salva
  - coordinates: 47°18′2″N 24°21′2″E
- Length: 44 km (27 mi)
- Basin size: 413 km^{2} (159 sq mi)

Basin features
- Progression: Someșul Mare→ Someș→ Tisza→ Danube→ Black Sea

The Sălăuța is a right tributary of the river Someșul Mare in Romania. It discharges into the Someșul Mare in Salva. Its length is 44 km (27 mi) and its basin size is 413 km^{2} (159 sq mi).

== Tributaries ==
The following rivers are tributaries to the river Sălăuța:

Left: Frumușica, Pârâul Repede, Strâmba, Telcișor, Valea Cerbului, Valea Stegii

Right: Valea Săbii, Fiad, Fiadțel, Bichigiu
