= Telcișor =

- Location within Romania

Location
- Country: Romania
- Counties: Bistrița-Năsăud County
- Villages: Telcișor, Telciu

Physical characteristics
- Mouth: Sălăuța
  - location: Telciu
  - coordinates: 47.4286°N 24.3901°E
- Length: 13 km (8.1 mi)
- Basin size: 86 km^{2} (33 sq mi)

Basin features
- Progression: Sălăuța→ Someșul Mare→ Someș→ Tisza→ Danube→ Black Sea
- Tributaries
  - left: Valea Lungă
  - right: Poiana

The Telcișor is a left tributary of the Sălăuța in Romania. It flows into the Sălăuța in Telciu. Its length is 13 km (8.1 mi) and its basin size is 86 km^{2} (33 sq mi).
