= George Coșbuc =

Romanian poet, translator, teacher and journalist (1866–1918)

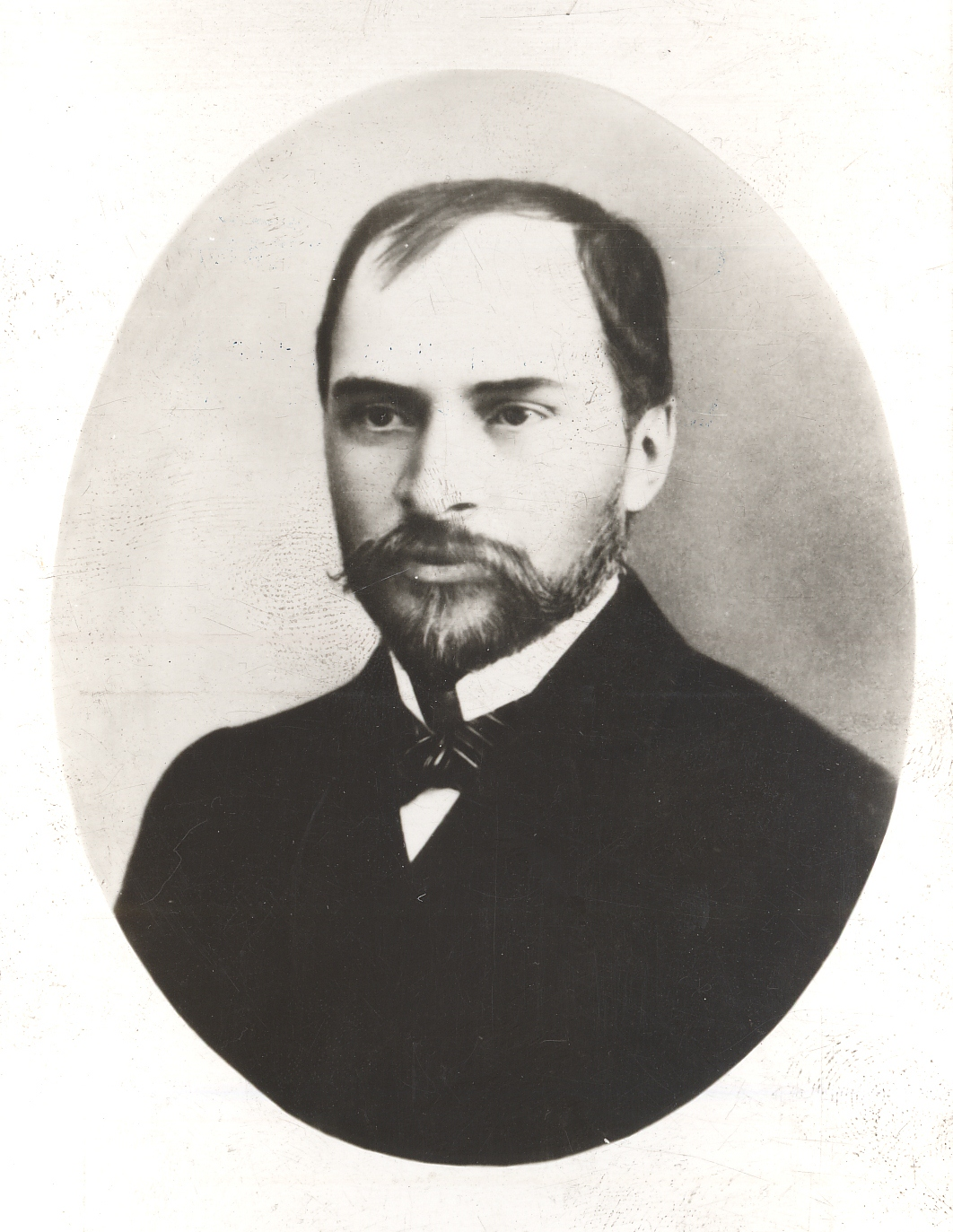
- Born: September 20, 1866; Faassendorf, Austrian Empire
- Died: May 9, 1918 (aged 51); Bucharest, Kingdom of Romania
- Resting place: Bellu Cemetery, Bucharest
- Education: Franz Joseph University
- Occupations: Poet; translator; teacher; journalist
- Spouse(s): Elena, née Sfetea
- Children: Alexandru
- Relatives: Sebastian Coșbuc (father); Maria Coșbuc (mother)
- Writing career
- Pen name: C. Boșcu
- Language: Romanian
- Years active: 1884–1918
- Notable works: Nunta Zamfirei (1889); Balade și idile (1893); Noi vrem pământ (1907)

Signature
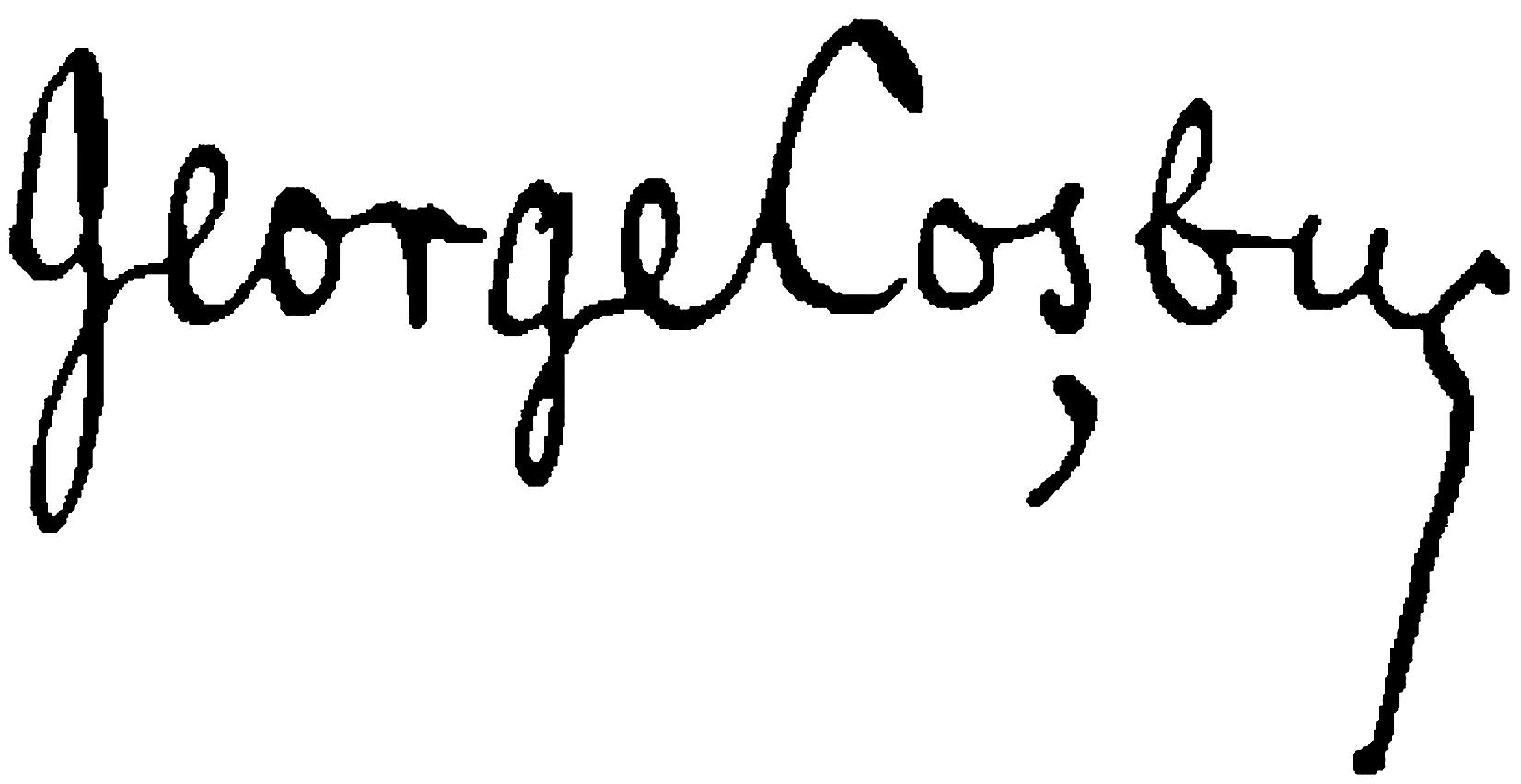

George Coșbuc (Romanian pronunciation: [ˈdʒe̯ordʒe koʃˈbuk]; 20 September 1866 – 9 May 1918) was a Romanian poet, translator, teacher, and journalist, best remembered for his verses describing, praising and eulogizing rural life, its many travails but also its occasions for joy. In 1916 he was elected titular member of the Romanian Academy.

== Biography ==
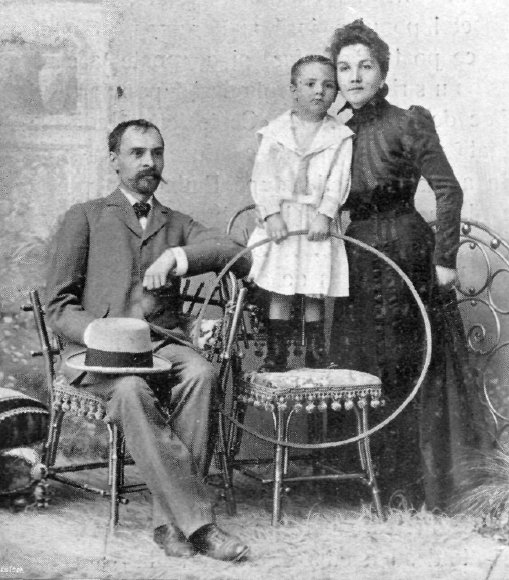
Coșbuc with wife and son in a photograph published in 1905

=== Early life ===
Coșbuc was born in Hordou, a village in northeastern Transylvania. His father, Sebastian Coșbuc, a Greek Catholic priest looked up to by his parish, drew from a line reputed to have yielded fourteen consecutive generations of priests. George attended primary school and graduated to secondary classes in the neighboring village of Telcs (now: Telciu). He happily took to the scholarly bent encouraged by his father, earning the praise of instructors and being chosen among the few who were to sign up for advanced courses at Gimnaziul Superior Românesc Greco-Catolic (Romanian Lyceum), a higher learning academy in the town of Năsăud. He soon found himself doubling as a teacher.

He began tearing through the library of the institution, impressing colleagues with his encyclopedic inclinations, and joined a local literary club, the Virtus Romana Rediviva, an association his father frowned upon as a deviation from a prospective career as clergyman. In 1884, already a well-loved teacher at the age of 24, he published his very first poems in the yearly almanac of the literary club.

=== First works ===
Coșbuc began attending courses at Franz Joseph University in 1884, while collecting fairy tales and popular stories, which he rewrote and published to local success. He became so popular that three years later, he was asked to become editor in chief of the main Cluj Romanian newspaper, Tribuna.

He soon published what widely became known as his first masterpiece, Nunta Zamfirei ("Zamfira's Wedding") to enthusiastic praise in Romanian literary circles. He moved to Bucharest, the capital of Romania, and the center of cultural discourse in that country. He contributed to the periodical Convorbiri Literare to consistent acclaim. In collaboration with other former educators, he pieced together a praised Romanian language textbook: Carte românească de citire (the "Romanian Book of Reading").

=== 1890s ===
In 1893, he published Balade și idile ("Ballads and Pastorals"), a volume which cemented his reputation. He began dabbling in poetry with political subtext, penning the emphatic Noi vrem pământ ("We Demand Land"), Lupta vieții ("Life's struggle"), and overviewed the debut of yet another literary magazine, Vatra. In 1895, he married Elena Sfetea.

He completed the first Romanian translation of Virgil's Aeneid in 1896, and also published a collection of various poems and short stories, Versuri și proză ("Verses and Prose"). His output as a translator is astonishing: within the span of three years, he published large portions of Kalidassa's Sanskrit Abhignānashākuntala (some of them through German translations), and a new Romanian translation of Homer's Odyssey. Coșbuc also undertook the translation of various works by Friedrich Schiller. The Romanian Academy deemed him an "outstanding member" in 1898. He further contributed to literature by completing, a decade later, the epic effort of translating Dante Aligheri's Divine Comedy in its entirety.

=== Later life ===
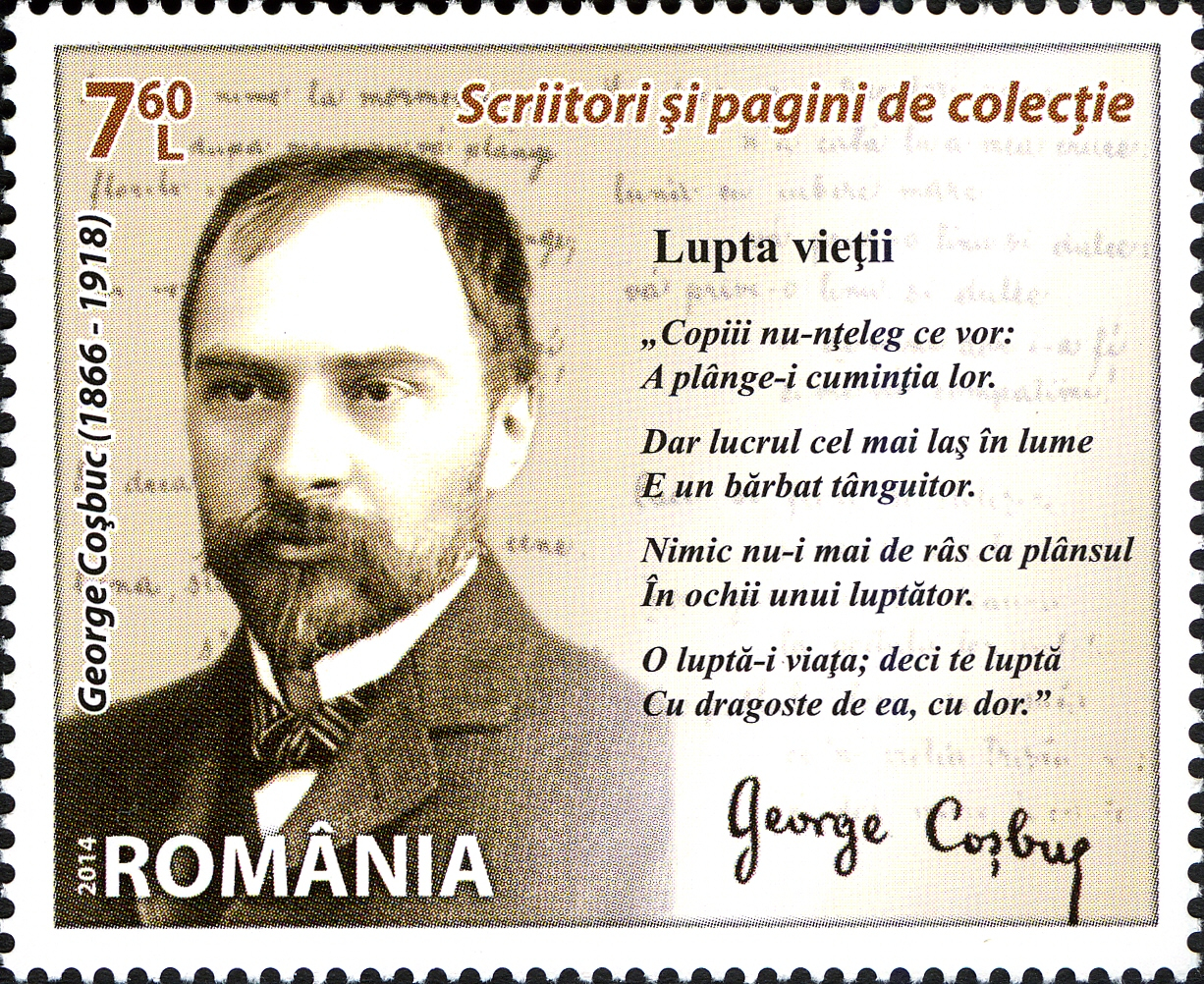
George Coșbuc on a 2014 Romanian stamp

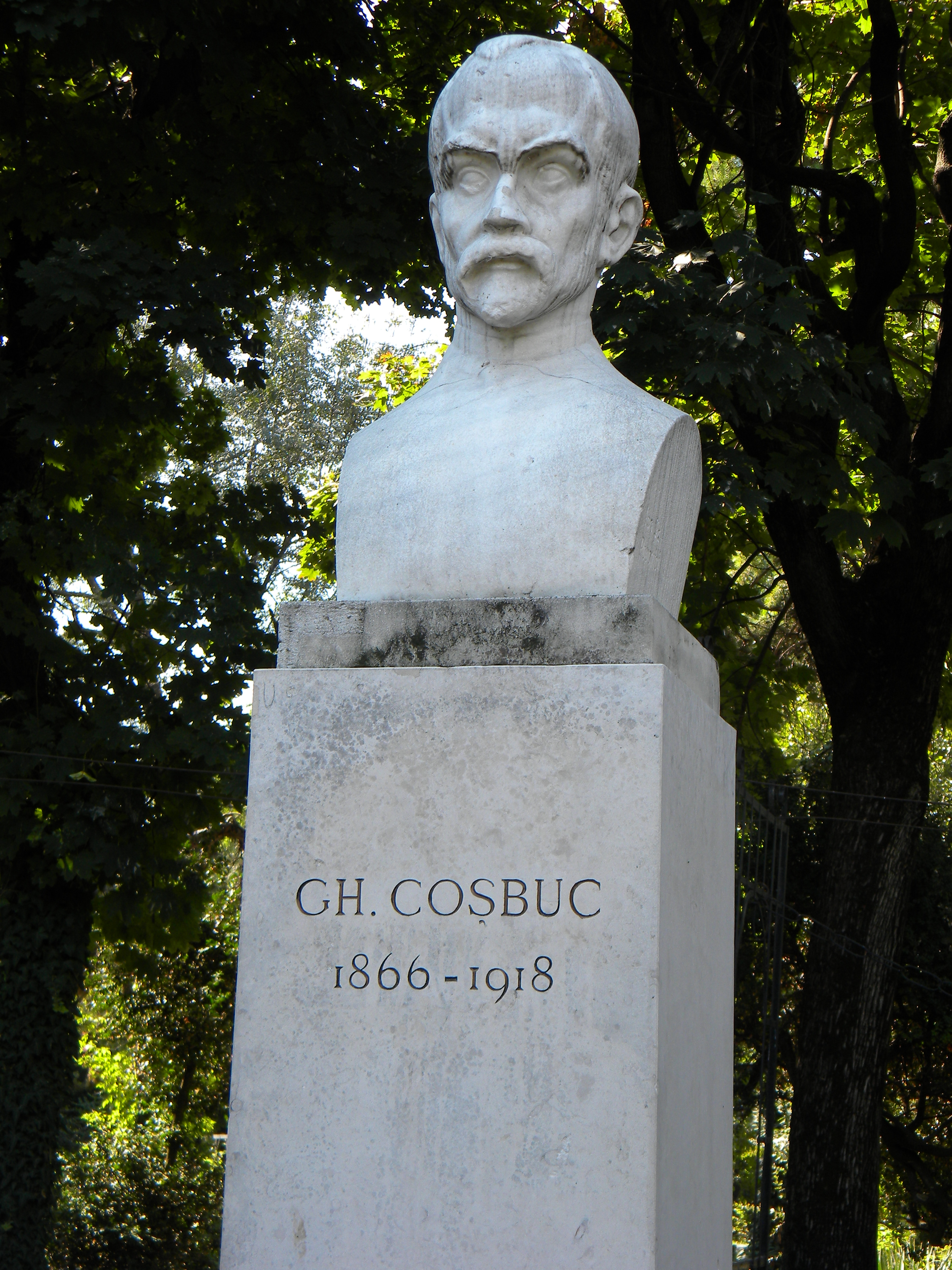
Bust of Coșbuc în the Cișmigiu Gardens, Bucharest

In December 1901, he joined Alexandru Vlahuță in founding and, until 1905, editing the influential magazine Sămănătorul, a traditionalist publication appealing to those intellectuals who could claim peasant roots. After more than a decade of tremendous success as an author, he experienced personal tragedy in August 1915, when his only son, Alexandru, died in a car accident. Heartbroken, Coșbuc ceased all work. He died three years later in Bucharest, and was buried at Bellu Cemetery.

== Legacy ==
The name of his native village was changed from Hordou to Coșbuc in 1925. There are busts of him in the Cișmigiu Gardens of Bucharest, as well as in Arad, Bistrița, Cojocna, Iași, Năsăud, and Sibiu. There are several high schools named after the writer, including the George Coșbuc National College in Năsăud (founded in 1863, and named after him in 1919), the George Coșbuc National College in Cluj (founded in 1919, and named after him in 1959), and the George Coșbuc National Bilingual College in Bucharest.
