= Valea Bradului =

Valea Bradului may refer to several villages in Romania:

- Valea Bradului, a village in Mihăeşti Commune, Argeș County
- Valea Bradului, a village in Brad city, Hunedoara County
- Valea Bradului, a village in Provița de Sus Commune, Prahova County
