= Gelu Vlașin =

Romanian poet and essayist

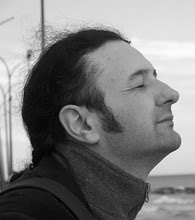
- Madrid
- Born: 30 August 1966 (age 60); Telciu, Romania
- Occupations: Poet, essayist, journalist
- Writing career
- Period: 1995 – present
- Literary movement: Déprimisme, Minimalism

Gelu Vlașin (born 30 August 1966) is a Romanian poet and essayist.

Born in Telciu, Bistrița-Năsăud County, Romania on 30 August 1966, he is married to Cristina Maria Vlasin (music teacher and jazz singer) and has a son Darius Andrei Vlasin (born in Madrid on 4 December 2009). Had his literary debut in România Literară Magazine 16/1999, with an introduction made by Nicolae Manolescu; his editorial debut was in 1999 with the poetry volume Tratat la psihiatrie (Cured at Psychiatry), published at Vinea Publisher, Bucharest, with a preface by Nicolae Manolescu and an afterword by Paul Cernat; The volume won the award of the debut section of the Bucharest Writers Association in 1999 and was a nominee at the Romanian Union of Writers Awards, 1999.

== Works ==
His debut as a writer was in 1999, in România Literară magazine.

=== Poetry ===
- Tratat la psihiatrie - Ed. Vinea, Bucarest - 1999 / Editura Liternet - 2006,
- Atac de panică - Noesis, Bucarest - 2000 & Ed. Muzeul Literaturii Române, Bucarest - 2002,
- Poemul Turn - Colecția "Biblioteca Bucarest" - Asociația Scriitorilor din București & Ed. Azero - 2005,
- Ultima suflare - Ed. Muzeul Literaturii Române, Bucuresti / A.S.B. - 2001 & Editura Liternet - 2003
- Omul decor - Ed.Brumar, Timișoara, 2009
- Ayla - Ed. Cartea Românească, Bucarest, 2011

=== Collaboration with Literary Magazines ===
Gelu Vlașin published poetry, essay and literary reviews in the majority of the literary magazines from Romania also in magazines from United States, Canada, Spain, Germany, France, Italy, Russia, Morocco, Argentina, Mexico, Australia, Hungary and Israel.

=== Essays ===
- Don Quijote Rătăcitorul Eikon Publishing House, 2009

=== Professional Activities ===
- Member of USR Romanian Writers Union (2000)
- Member of the National Council of USR - Romanian Writers Union (2009)
- Member of Monitoring and Suspension Commission USR - Romanian Writers Union (2010)
- Member of ASB – Bucharest Writers Association(2000)
- Member of the Leading Commission of Poetry Section from ASB Bucharest Writers Association (2009)
- President of the Association Hispano-Romanian Dialogo Europeo (2007)
- First Vice-President of FEDROM – Federation of the Romanian Associations in Spain (2008)
- President of DIVERBIUM -Madrid (2009)
- Founder & Coordinator of online literary network Reţeaua literară
- Founder & Coordinator of The Club of the Romanians all-over the world România din Diaspora
- Founder & Coordinator al Literary Club DIVERBIUM from Madrid

== Literary Prizes ==
Also he won some prestigious national and international awards:

- Tertulia Cerro Almodovar Award – Madrid 2004
- Puertas Abiertas Award – Madrid 2002
- Colocviile Cosbuc Award, 2000
- Debut Award of Bucharest Writers Association 1999
- The International Festival of Sighet Award 2000
- The Great Award Ion Vinea 1999
- Cristian Popescu Award 1999
- Liviu Rebreanu Salons Award 1999
