= Bichigiu =

- Location within Romania

Location
- Country: Romania
- Counties: Bistrița-Năsăud County
- Villages: Bichigiu

Physical characteristics
- Source: Țibleș Mountains
- Mouth: Sălăuța
  - location: Upstream of Coșbuc
- Length: 15 kilometres (9.3 mi)
- Basin size: 42 square kilometres (16 sq mi)

Basin features
- Progression: Sălăuța→ Someșul Mare→ Someș→ Tisza→ Danube→ Black Sea

The Bichigiu is a right tributary of the river Sălăuța in Romania. It flows into the Sălăuța between Telciu and Coșbuc. Its length is 15 kilometres (9.3 mi) and its basin size is 42 square kilometres (16 sq mi).
