= Gogoșu =

Gogoşu may refer to several places in Romania:

- Gogoșu, Dolj, a commune in Dolj County
- Gogoșu, Mehedinți, a commune in Mehedinţi County
