= Tăușoare-Zalion Reserve =

Cave system in Romania

Tăușoare Cave
- Peștera Izvorul Tăușoarelor
- Location within Romania
- Interactive map of Tăușoare Cave
- Location: Telciu, Rodna Mountains, Bistrița-Năsăud County, Romania
- Coordinates: 47°26′34″N 24°31′45″E
- Depth: 413.5 m (1,357 ft)
- Length: 20 km (12 mi)
- Elevation: 950 m (3,120 ft)
- Discovery: Leon Bârte (1955)
- Entrances: 1
- Features: mirabilite, anthodites

The Tăușoare-Zalion Reserve is a cave system located in the deeply forested areas of the Rodna Mountains, Bistrița-Năsăud County, in Romania.

The Tăușoare Cave was discovered in 1955 by a teacher, Leon Bârte. Located at an altitude of 950 metres (3,120 feet), it has a length of 20 km (12 mi) and a depth of 413.5 m (1,357 ft), making it the deepest and the third longest cave in Romania. The protected underground area covers 72.1 hectares (178 acres).

Since 2000 the cave has been legally protected as a natural area, and since 2010 it has been placed under the custodianship of the Complexul Muzeal Bistrița-Năsăud; it is also designated as a Natura 2000 site (ROSCI0193 "Peștera Tăușoare").

The cave features rare minerals, such as mirabilite and anthodites, being second in Romania in value of anthodites, after the Peștera Vântului in the Pădurea Craiului Mountains. In addition, speleological studies describe abundant sulphate speleothems (gypsum and bassanite) and the first Romanian occurrences of the minerals leonit and konyaite in the cave. The underground system is noted for “Bilele de Tăușoare”, spherical limestone nodules regarded as unique at least within Romania and sometimes described as unique worldwide.

The cave also contains notable gypsum and mirabilite formations in named chambers such as the "Sala de Mese" and rare radial sulphate aggregates (locally called oulofolite).

A fossil deposit of Ursus spelaeus (cave bear) and Ursus arctos (brown bear) bones is preserved in the “Sala Oaselor de Urs”; the site is mentioned as one of the less studied fossil bear deposits in Romanian caves. Popular and scientific accounts also describe the cave as the only one in the Eastern Carpathians where glacial-age cave bear fauna has been documented.

Biological interest is linked both to the cave's invertebrate fauna and its large bat colonies. The subterranean fauna includes amphipods, cyclopoids, collembolans and diplurans. During winter, several thousand bats (over 4,000 individuals according to museum data, and up to 5,000–10,000 in later estimates) of at least four species use the cave as a hibernation site, including Myotis myotis, Myotis blythii, Rhinolophus hipposideros and other rhinolophids.

Several descriptions emphasize that the cave is technically demanding and was long closed to ordinary tourism, with access restricted to scientific teams; more recent regulations allow only tightly controlled eco-tourist visits during periods when bats are not hibernating.
