= Valea Calului =

Valea Calului may refer to the following places in Romania:

- Valea Calului, a village the commune Șuici, Argeș County
- Valea Calului, a tributary of the Fiad in Bistrița-Năsăud County
- Valea Calului, a tributary of the Pogăniș in Caraș-Severin County
- Valea Calului, a tributary of the Timiș in Brașov County
- Valea Calului, a tributary of the Iara in Cluj County
- Valea Calului, a tributary of the Râul Târgului in Argeș County

== See also ==
- Calul (disambiguation)
