= Runk =

Runk may refer to:

- Runk, the Hungarian name for several places in Romania:
  - Runcu Salvei, a commune in Bistrița-Năsăud County
  - Runc, a village in Sărmaș Commune, Harghita County
- John Runk (1791–1872), American politician
- Carl Runk, American football coach
- Dorothy Runk Mennen (1915–2011), American voice teacher
- Jennie Runk (born 1988), American model
- Runk (Legends of Chima), a character in Legends of Chima

== See also ==
- Runk Bridge, a historic Pratt truss bridge in Huntingdon County, Pennsylvania
- 4662 Runk, a minor planet
- Raja Aur Runk, a 1968 Bollywood film
