= Ghencea Cemetery =

Cemetery in Bucharest, Romania

Ghencea Military Cemetery
- Romania
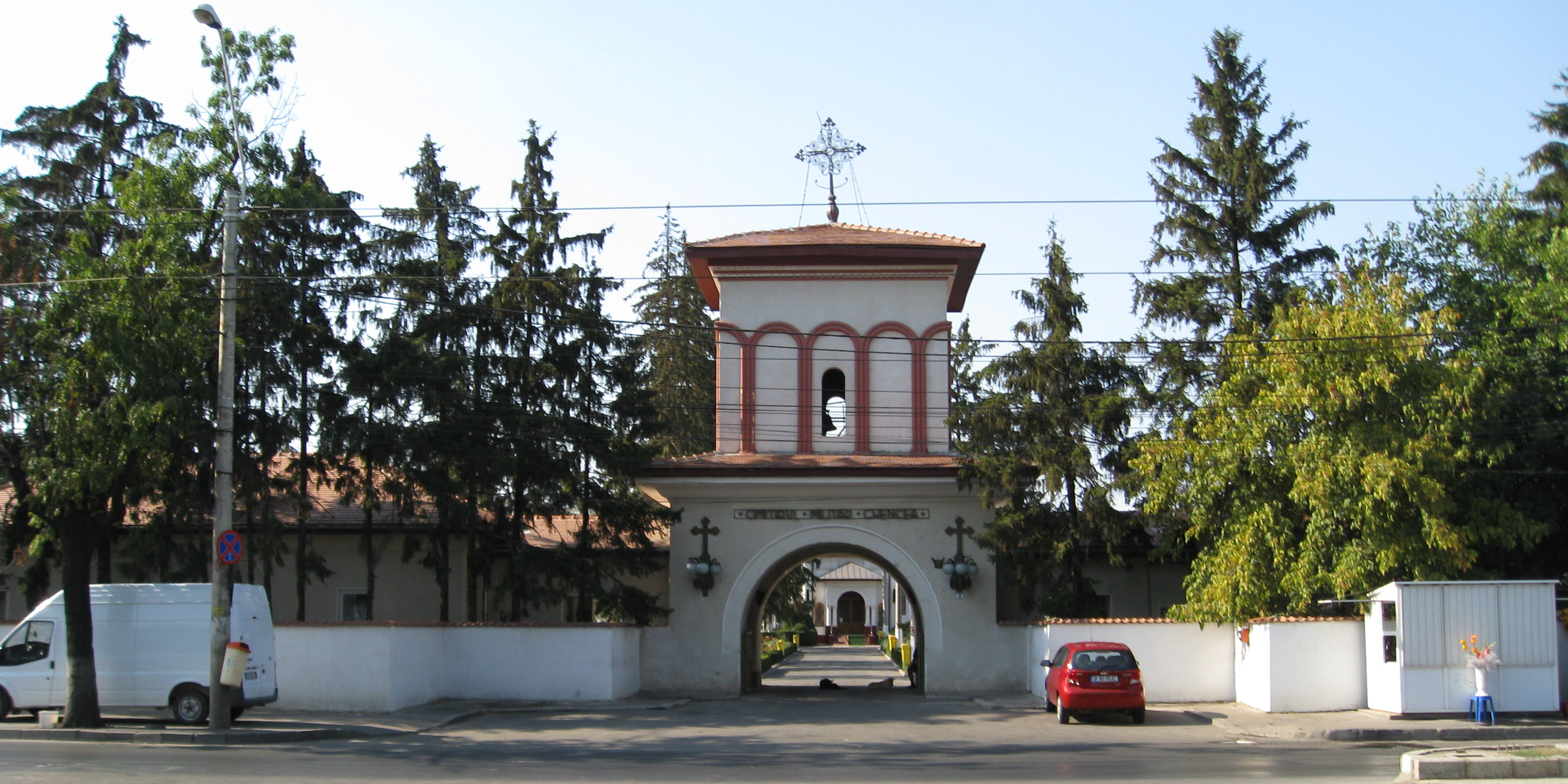
- The entrance to the military section
- For the Heroes of the Wars
- Location: 44°25′06″N 26°03′12″E; Bucharest, Romania

Burials by war
- World War I World War II

Ghencea Cemetery is located in Ghencea neighbourhood of Bucharest, on Ghencea Boulevard, in Sector 6. The cemetery has two sections, civilian and military.

== Notable interments ==
- Cabiria Andreian Cazacu (1928–2018), mathematician
- Gheorghe Argeșanu (1883–1940), general and statesman
- Niki Atanasiu (1907–1967), actor
- Mihai Baicu (1975–2009), footballer
- Grigore Bălan (1896–1944), general in World War II
- Iolanda Balaș (1936–2016), athlete and Olympic champion
- Maria Butaciu (1940–2018), performer of folklore music
- Gianu Bucurescu (1924–2016), Securitate officer
- Cornelia Catangă (1958–2021), singer
- Elena Ceaușescu (1916–1989), communist activist and wife of President Nicolae Ceaușescu
- Nicolae Ceaușescu (1918–1989), 1st President of Romania
- Nicu Ceaușescu (1951–1996), communist politician and second son of Nicolae and Elena Ceaușescu
- Mihai Chițac (1928–2010), general and 117th Minister of the Interior
- Lucreția Ciobanu (1924–2015), folk singer from Sibiu
- Mihai Constantinescu (1946–2019), musician
- Florin Constantiniu (1933–2012), historian
- Florența Crăciunescu (1955–2008), Olympic athlete
- Gheorghe Cucu (1882–1932), composer, conductor, and folklorist
- Ion Dincă (1928–2007), communist politician, Deputy Prime Minister, and Mayor of Bucharest
- Eugenia Greceanu (1928–2016), architect
- Aimée Iacobescu (1946–2018), actress
- Ion Iliescu (1930–2025), politician and engineer who served as the first and the third President of Romania
- Alexandru Ioanițiu (1890–1941), general
- Ioan Ioniță (1924–1987), Communist general and politician who served as Minister of Defence
- Mihaela Mitrache (1955–2008), actress
- Mariana Nicolesco (1948–2022), operatic soprano
- Angelo Niculescu (1921–2015), football player and manager
- Alexis Nour (1877–1940), journalist, activist, and essayist
- Alexandru Pastia (1893–1942), military officer
- Gheorghe Pintilie (1902–1985), 1st Director of the Securitate
- Temistocle Popa (1921–2013), composer, musician, and film actor
- Cristian Popescu (1959–1995), poet
- Tudor Postelnicu (1931–2017), communist politician, Director of the Securitate, Interior Minister
- Ilie Savu (1920–2010), footballer and coach
- Alexandru Șerbănescu (1912–1944), flying ace in World War II
- Iosif Sîrbu (1925–1964), sport shooter and Romania’s first ever Olympic champion
- Niculae Spiroiu (1936–2022), general and 78th Minister of National Defense
- Toni Tecuceanu (1972–2010), comedy actor
- Costică Toma (1928–2008), footballer and coach
- Nicolae Tonitza (1886–1940), painter and illustrator
- Cristian Țopescu (1937–2018), journalist and politician
- Virgil Trofin (1926–1984), communist politician
- Corneliu Vadim Tudor (1949–2015), leader of the Greater Romania Party, poet, writer, journalist, and a Member of the European Parliament
- Olimpian Ungherea (1937–2012), writer
- Doru-Viorel Ursu (1953–2024), politician and lawyer
- Ștefan Vencov (1899–1955), physicist and rector of Politehnica University
- Ilie Verdeț (1925–2001), 51st Prime Minister of Romania
- Iulian Vlad (1931–2017), last Director of the Securitate

== Gallery ==
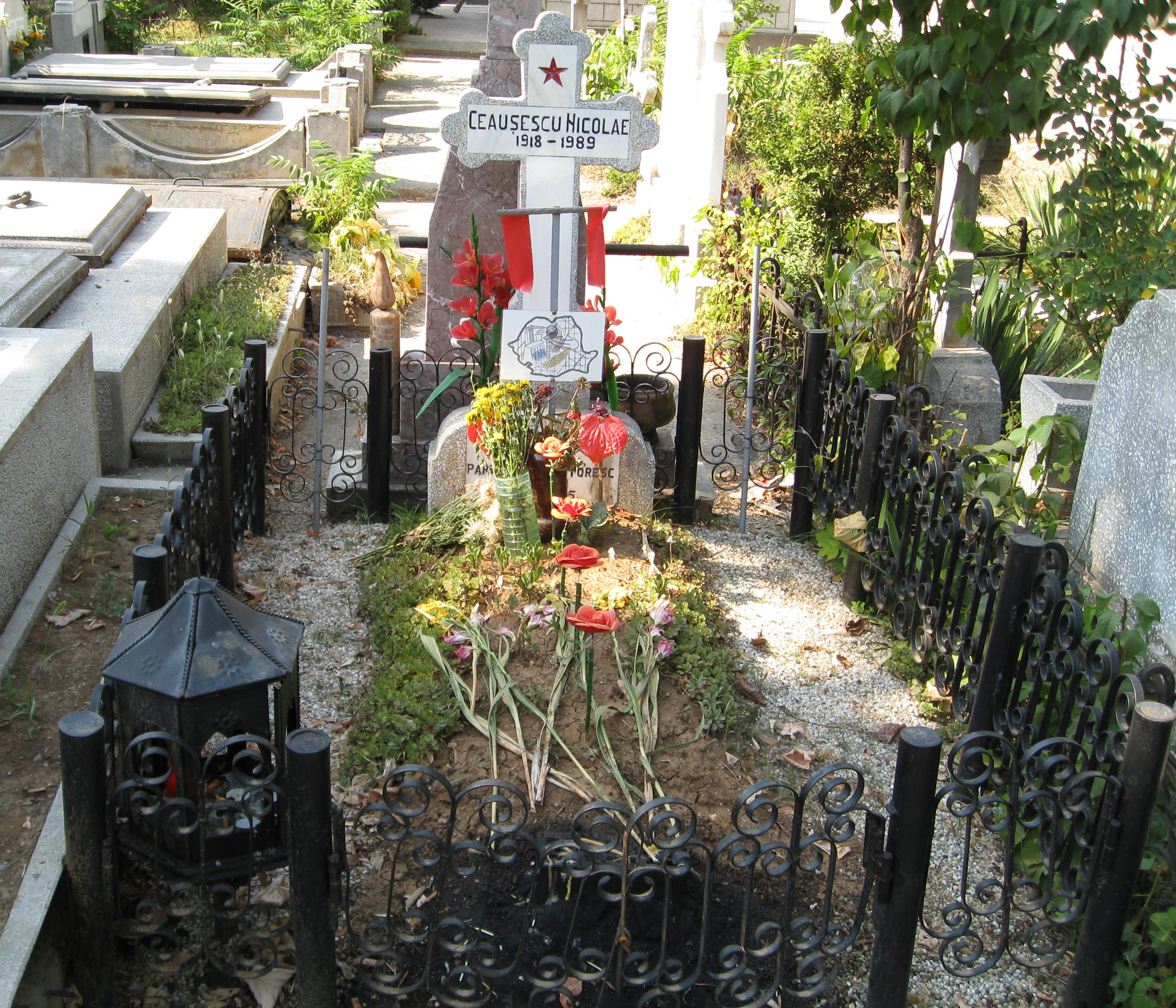
Former grave of Nicolae Ceaușescu

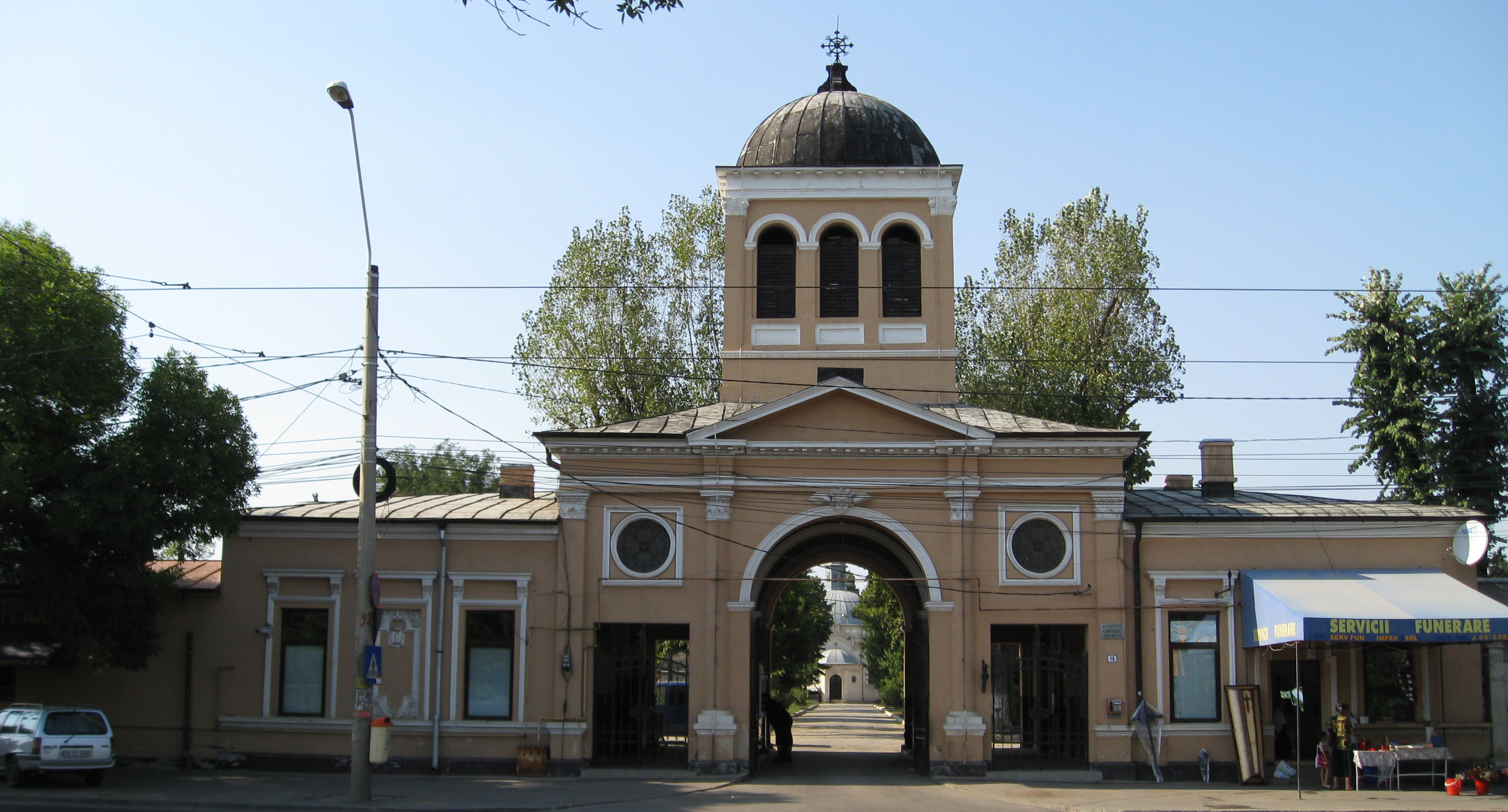
Entrance to the Ghencea Civilian Cemetery

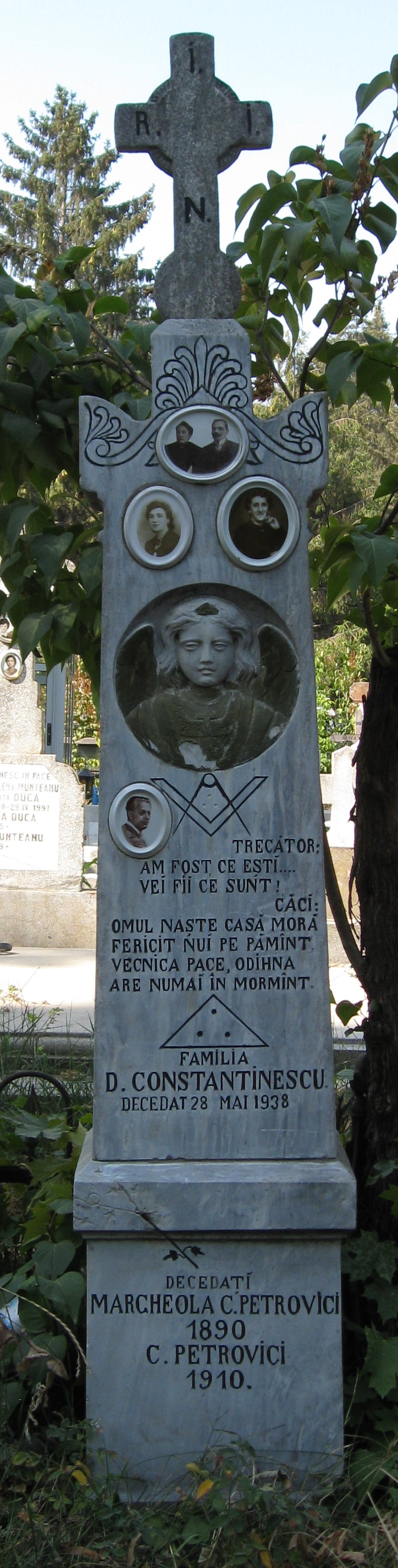
Grave in Ghencea cemetery, with Masonic symbol

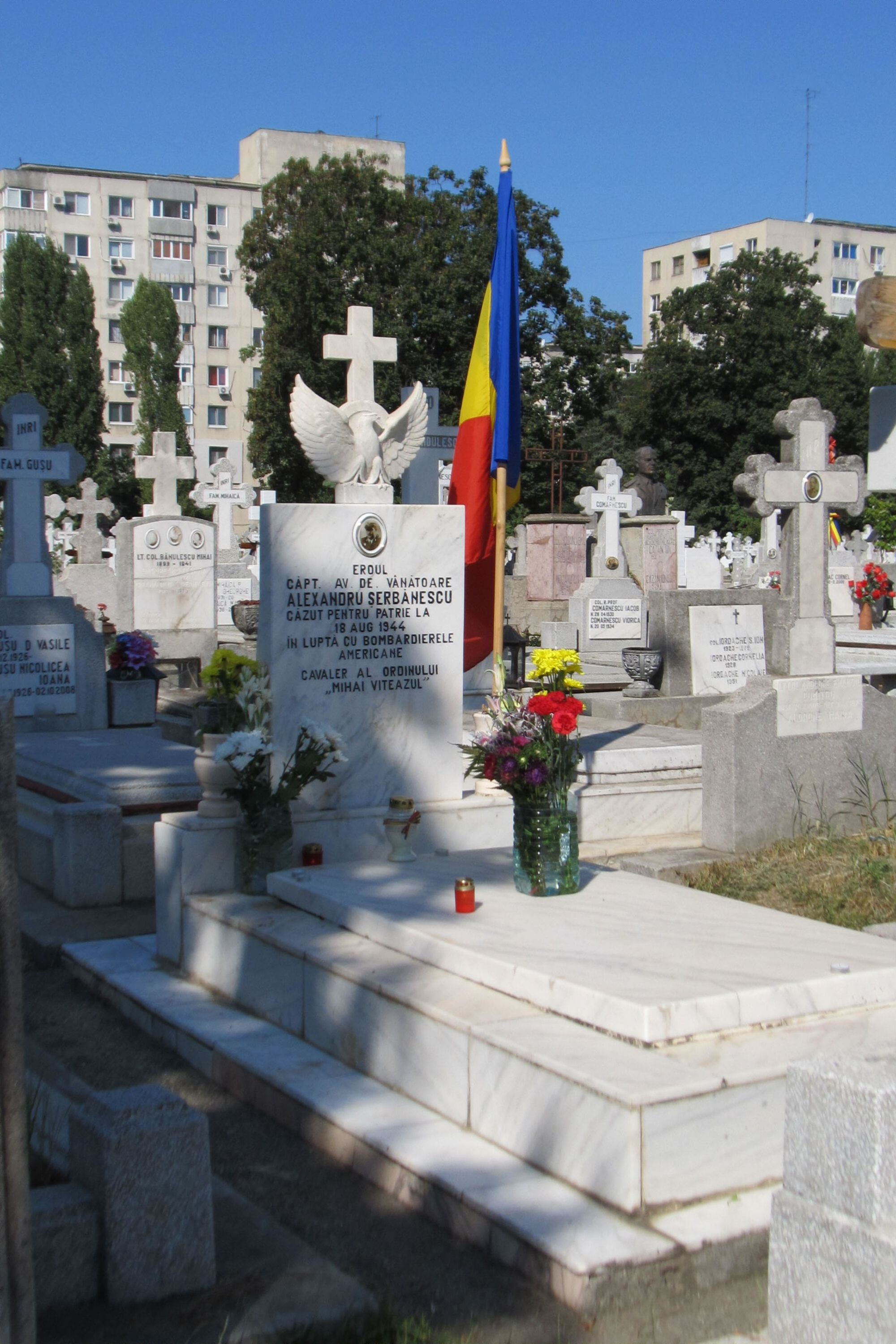
Grave of Alexandru Șerbănescu

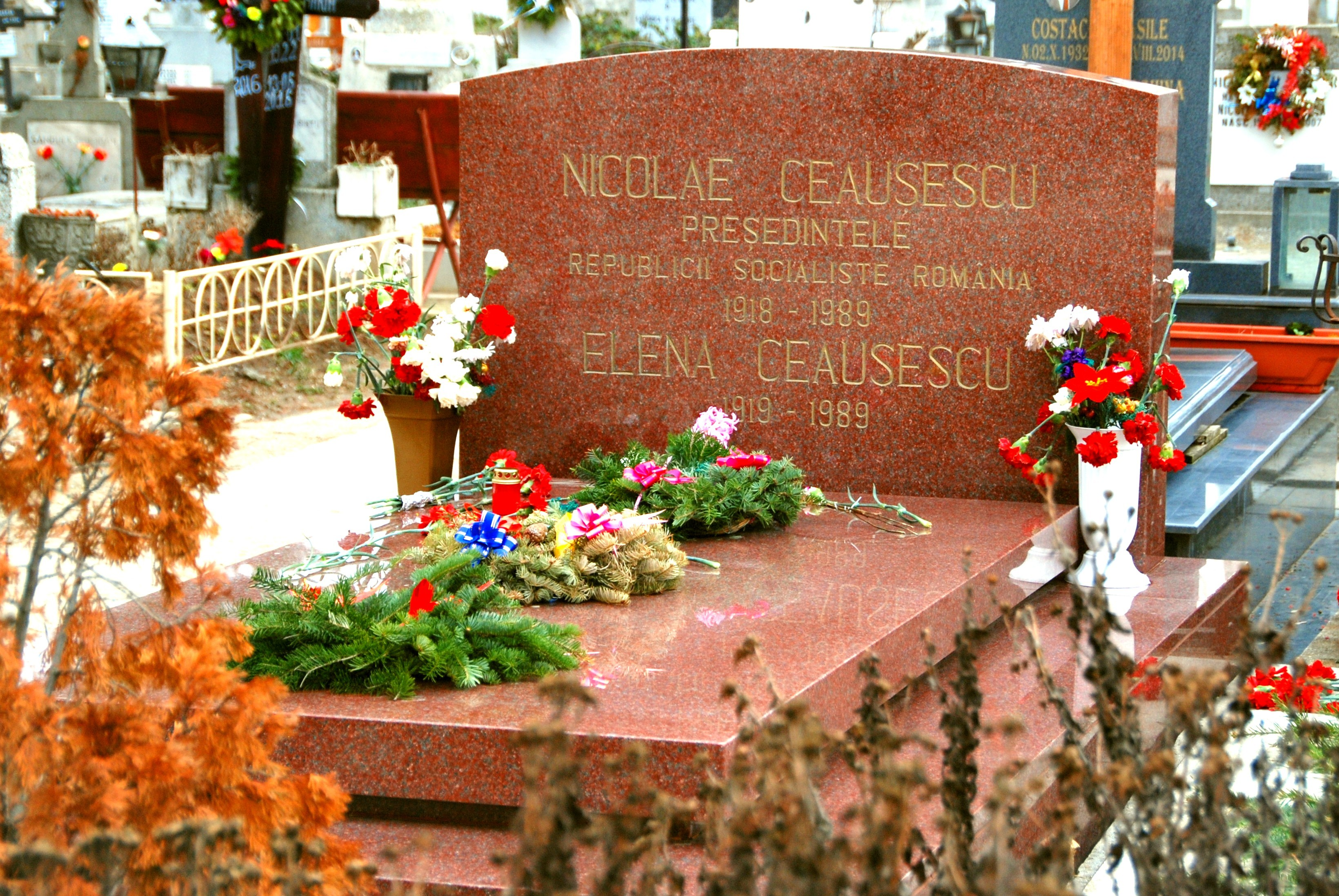
Grave of Nicolae and Elena Ceaușescu
