= Alexandru Pastia =

Romanian military officer

- Born: January 25, 1893; Fălticeni, Kingdom of Romania
- Died: November 21, 1942 (aged 49); Stalingrad Oblast, Soviet Union
- Burial place: Ghencea Cemetery, Bucharest, Romania
- Education: Higher War School
- Military career
- Allegiance: Kingdom of Romania
- Branch: Romanian Land Forces
- Service years: 1913–1942
- Rank: Colonel; Brigadier general (post-mortem)
- Commands: Group 1 of 1st Armored Division
- Conflicts: Second Balkan War; World War I; Hungarian–Romanian War; World War II; Battle of Stalingrad †
- Awards: Order of the Crown (Romania), Knight class Order of the Star of Romania, Officer class Order of Michael the Brave, 3rd class (post-mortem)

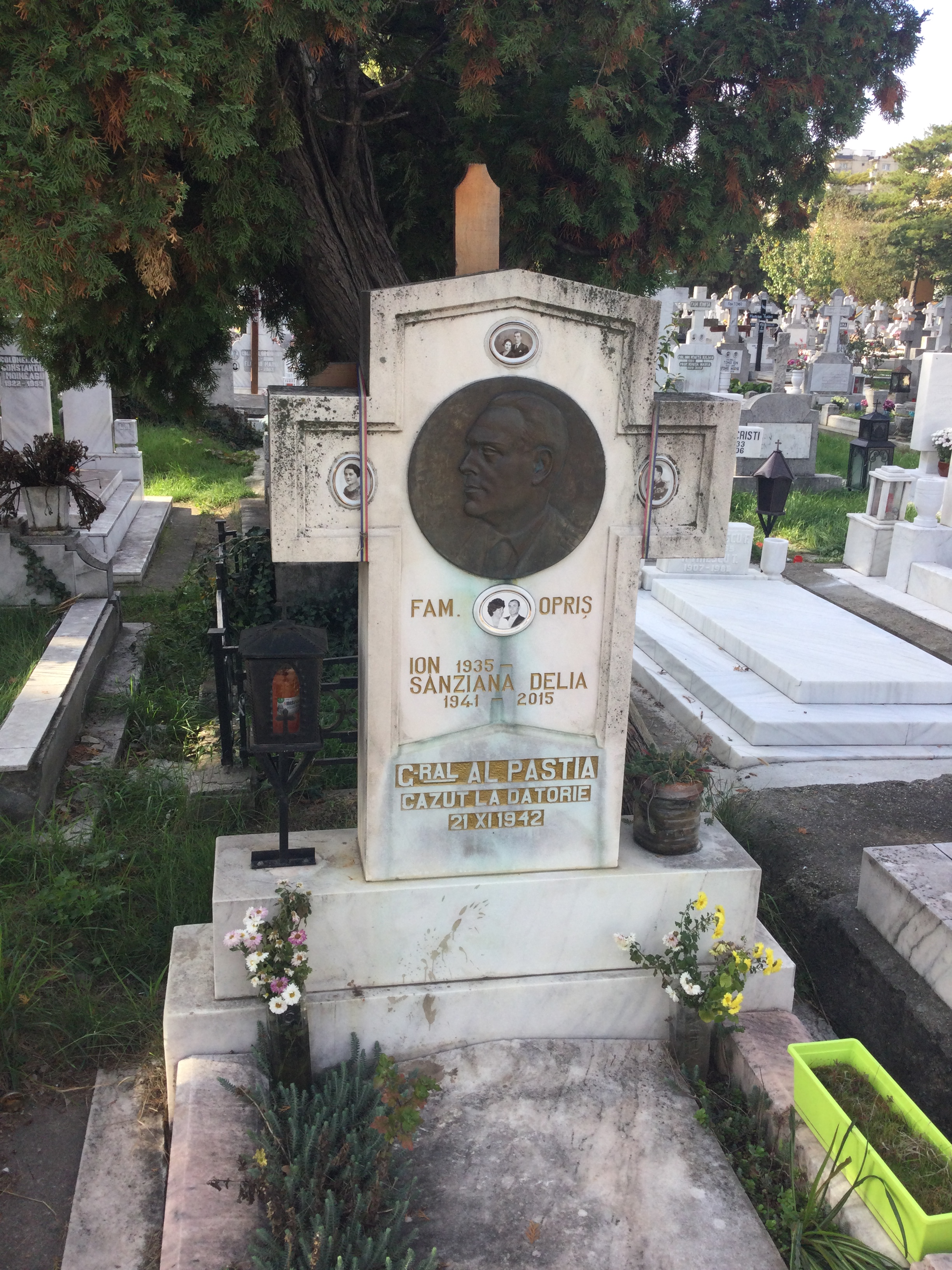
Grave in Ghencea Cemetery

Alexandru Pastia (January 25, 1893 – November 21, 1942) was a Romanian military officer.

He was born in Fălticeni, then in Baia County (now in Suceava County); his mother was Olga Pastia, née Millo. He graduated in 1907 from the Alecu Donici High School in his native city and then entered the infantry officers’ academy in Bucharest. In 1912, he was sent to study in Germany. Upon his return, Pastia was assigned to an infantry regiment, within which he took part in the Second Balkan War. He also served in the infantry during World War I, until being taken prisoner in 1916, during combat near the Argeș River. After his release, Pastia was placed in charge of a machine-gunners’ company. Major Pastia took part in the Hungarian–Romanian War, seeing combat in Maramureș and Hungary, where in July 1919 he stood out at the battles of Kisújszállás and Fegyvernek. Fighting with distinction, he was awarded the Order of the Crown, Knight class; the Order of the Star of Romania, Officer class; and the Order of Michael the Brave, 3rd class.

In 1925, he graduated from the Higher War School and was enrolled as a major in the general staff. From 1928 to 1930 he served as military attaché in Belgrade, in the Kingdom of Yugoslavia. Promoted to lieutenant colonel, Pastia taught at the Higher War School and was a commander at the infantry officers’ academy. He also headed the Royal Military Guard.

After Romania entered World War II in June 1941, he asked to be sent to the Eastern Front. On November 19, 1942, at the start of the Battle of Stalingrad, Colonel Pastia was assigned to the 1st Armored Division (General Gheorghe Radu), which was subordinated to the Third Romanian Army (General Petre Dumitrescu). He was in command of Group 1, comprising the 1st Tank Regiment, the 4th Motorized Vânători de munte Regiment, and a detachment from the 1st Artillery Regiment. His group, located on the heights between the Zariaza and Zuskan valleys, had the mission to advance on November 20 in the direction of Nizhny Zariznski and the Chir River, in order to connect with the German 22nd Panzer Division, some 20 kilometres (12 mi) away. That day, the 1st Romanian Armored Division, equipped with 121 R-2 light tanks and 19 German-produced tanks (Panzer III and IV) fought against the 19th Tank Brigade of the Soviet 1st Guards Tank Division; by the end of the day, the Romanians had destroyed 62 Soviet tanks for the cost of 25 tanks of their own. The next day, Pastia's group was attacked by artillery fire; he was mortally wounded by falling pieces of mortar. Initially buried at Rostov-on-Don, on December 26 he was reinterred at Ghencea Cemetery. He was posthumously granted the Order of Michael the Brave, 3rd class and advanced to brigadier-general.

The 63rd Tank Brigade of the Romanian Land Forces bears Pastia's name, and so does a street in Sibiu.
