= Niculae Spiroiu =

Romanian engineer and general (1936–2022)

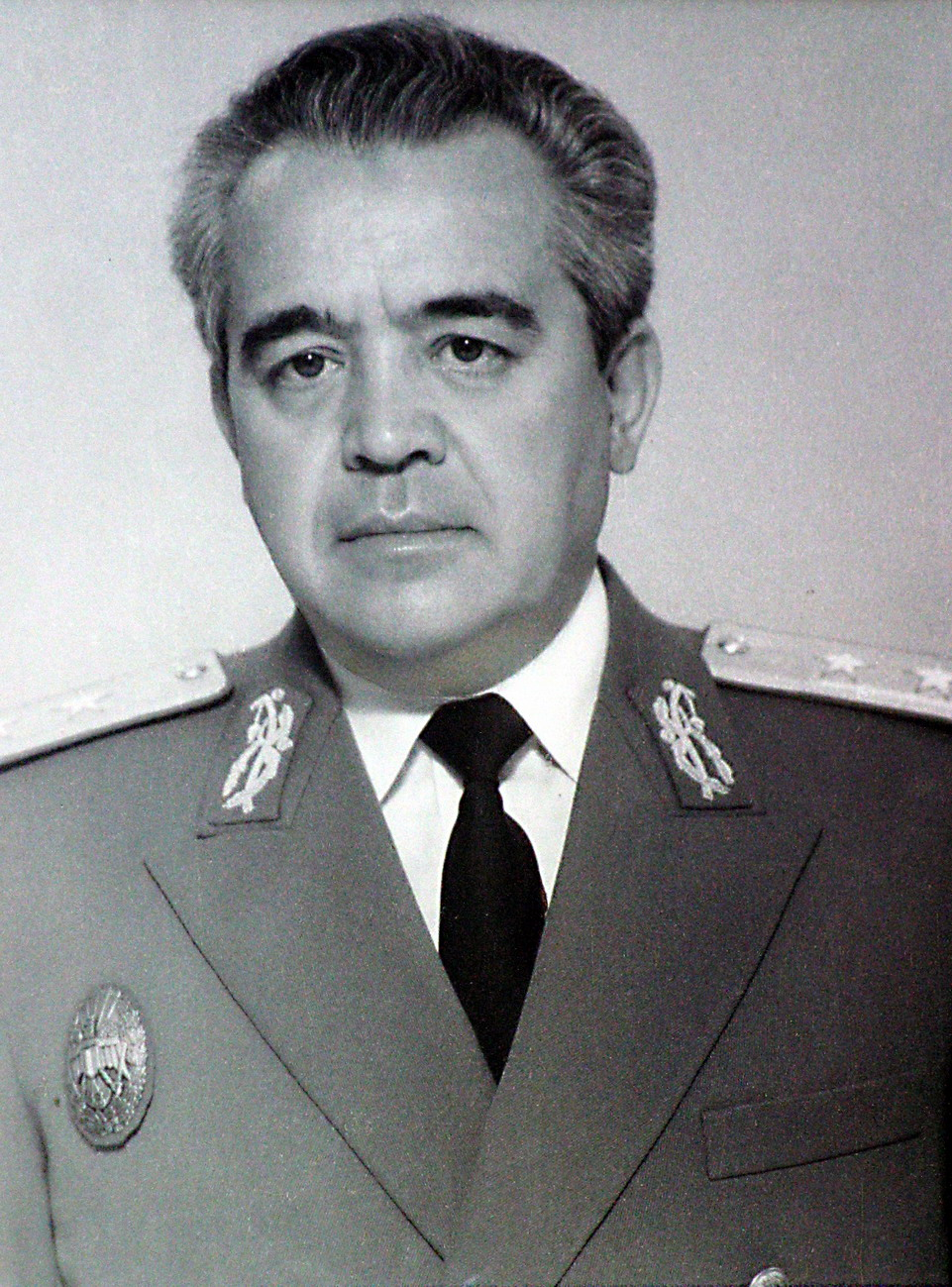

Minister of National Defense of Romania
- In office 30 April 1991 – 6 March 1994
- Preceded by: Victor Stănculescu
- Succeeded by: Gheorghe Tinca

Personal details
- Born: 6 July 1936 Bucharest, Kingdom of Romania
- Died: 31 March 2022 (aged 85) Bucharest, Romania
- Resting place: Ghencea Cemetery, Bucharest
- Profession: General

Niculae Spiroiu (6 July 1936 – 31 March 2022) was a Romanian engineer and retired Romanian Armed Forces general. He served as the Minister of National Defense from 30 April 1991 to 6 March 1994.

Spiroiu was born in Bucharest, the son of Constantin Spiroiu, originally from Glodu, a village in Argeș County. From 1947 to 1954, he attended the Mihai Viteazul High School in his native city, after which he enrolled in the Officers School in Pitești, graduating with the rank of lieutenant in 1960.

He died in Bucharest on 31 March 2022, at the age of 85, and was buried in the city's Ghencea Cemetery.
