= Helictite =

Speleothem whose axis changes

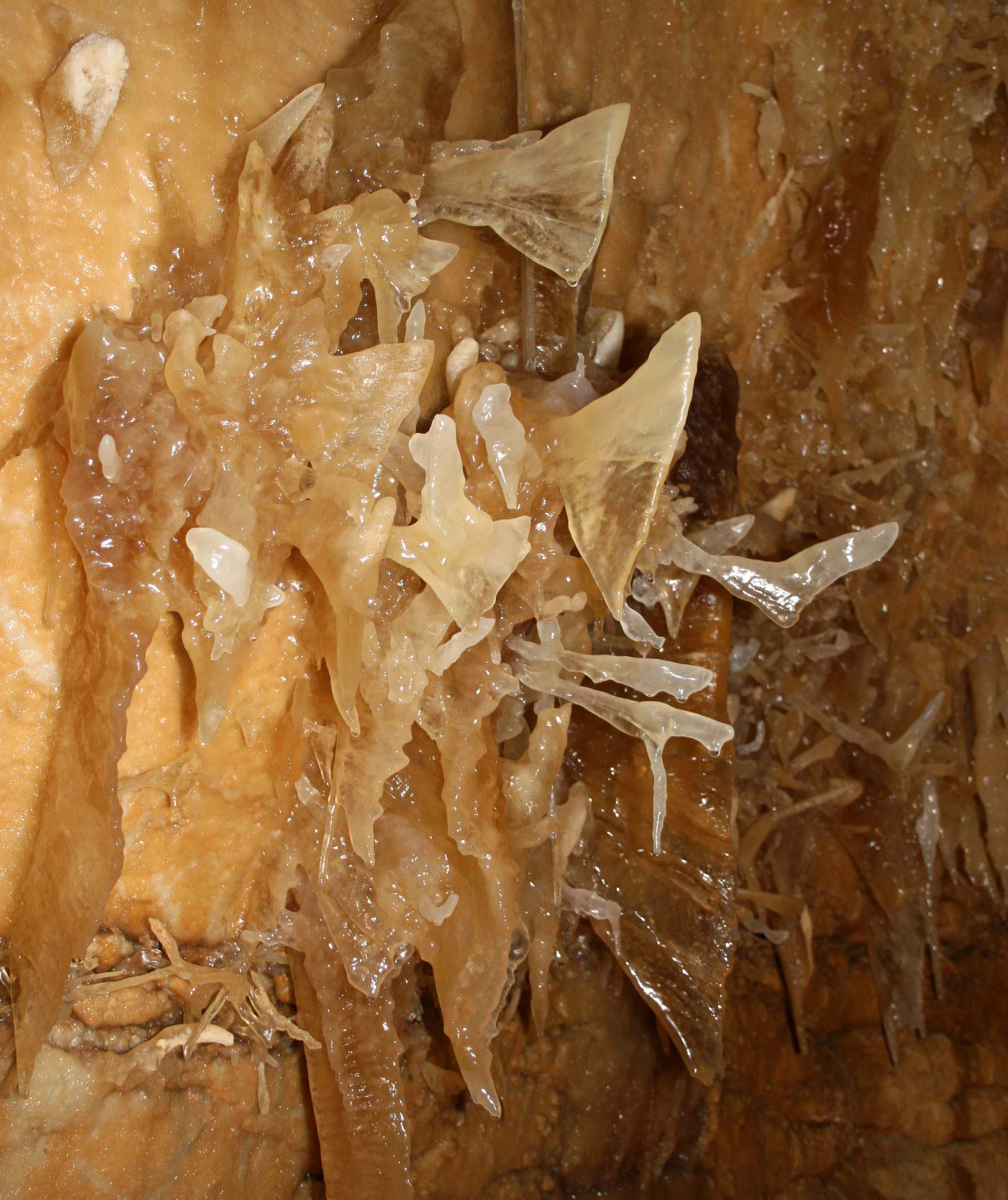
Rare "fishtail" helictites in the Caverns of Sonora near Sonora, Texas

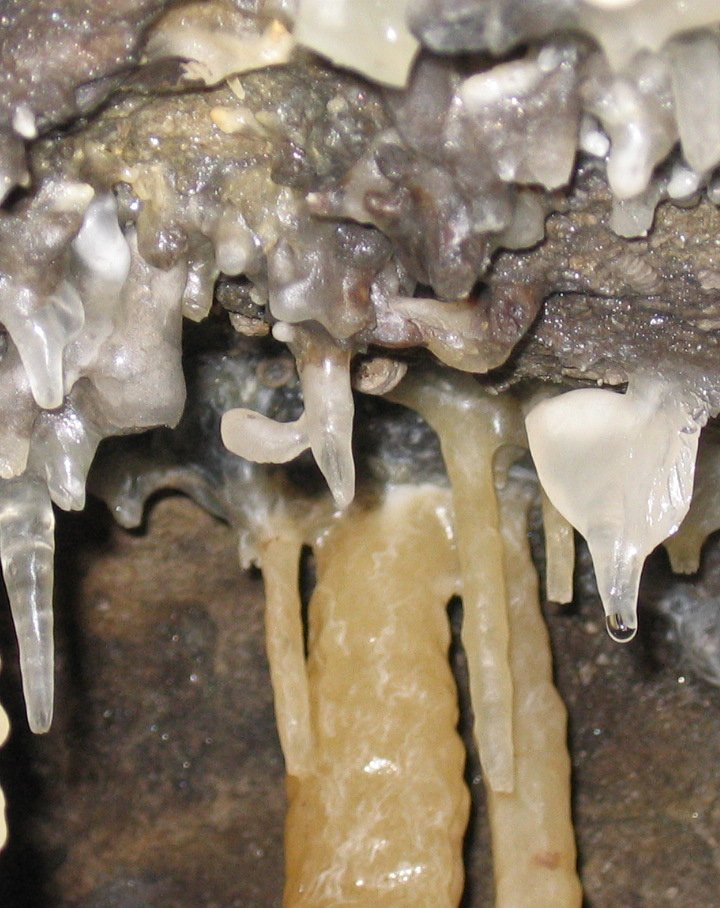
A helictite at Treak Cliff Cavern in Derbyshire

A helictite is a speleothem (cave-formed mineral) found in a limestone cave that changes its axis from the vertical at one or more stages during its growth. Helictites have a curving or angular form that looks as if they were grown in zero gravity. They are most likely the result of capillary forces acting on tiny water droplets, a force often strong enough at this scale to defy gravity.

Helictites are, perhaps, the most delicate of cave formations. They are usually made of needle-form calcite and aragonite. Helictite forms have been described in several types: ribbon helictites, saws, rods, butterflies, "hands", curly-fries, and "clumps of worms". They typically have radial symmetry. They can be easily crushed or broken by the slightest touch. Because of this, helictites are rarely seen within arm's reach in tourist caves.

Timpanogos Cave National Monument in Utah has one of the largest collections of these formations in the world. Large numbers are also in the Jenolan Caves in Australia and in the Pozalagua Cave in Karrantza, Spain. A remarkable suite of helictites also occurs in Asperge Cave, France. Can also be found in Black Chasm Cavern in California, USA.

== Formation ==
Diagram of dripstone cave structures (helictites are labeled H)

The growth of helictites is still quite enigmatic. To this day, there has been no satisfactory explanation for how they are formed. Currently, formation by capillary forces is the most likely hypothesis, but another hypothesis based on wind formation is also viable.

=== Capillary forces ===
The most likely hypothesis explains helictites as a result of capillary forces. If the helictite has a very thin central tube where the water flows as it does in straws, capillary forces would be able to transport water against gravity. This idea was inspired by some hollow helictites. However, the majority of helictites are not hollow. Despite this, droplets can be drawn to the tips of existing structures and deposit their calcite load almost anywhere thereon. This can lead to the wandering and curling structures seen in many helictites.

=== Wind ===
Another hypothesis names the wind in the cave as the main reason for the strange appearance. Drops hanging on a stalactite are blown to one side, so the dripstone grows in that direction. If the wind changes, the direction of growth changes too. However, this hypothesis is problematic because wind directions change frequently. The wind in caves depends on air pressure changes outside, which in turn depend on the weather. The wind direction changes as often as the weather conditions outside change. But the dripstones grow very slowly – several centimeters in 100 years – meaning that the wind direction would have to stay steady for long periods of time, changing for every fragment of a millimeter of growth. A second problem with this idea is that many caves with helictites have no natural entrance through which wind could enter.

=== Piezoelectric forces ===
Another hypothesis that has been proposed is that slowly changing geological pressure causing stresses on the crystals at the base alters the piezo electrostatic potential and causes particle deposition to be oriented in some relationship to the prevailing pressure orientation.

=== Bacterial ===
A recent hypothesis, which is supported by observation, is that a prokaryotic bacterial film provides a nucleation site for mineralization process.

== Helictite growth ==
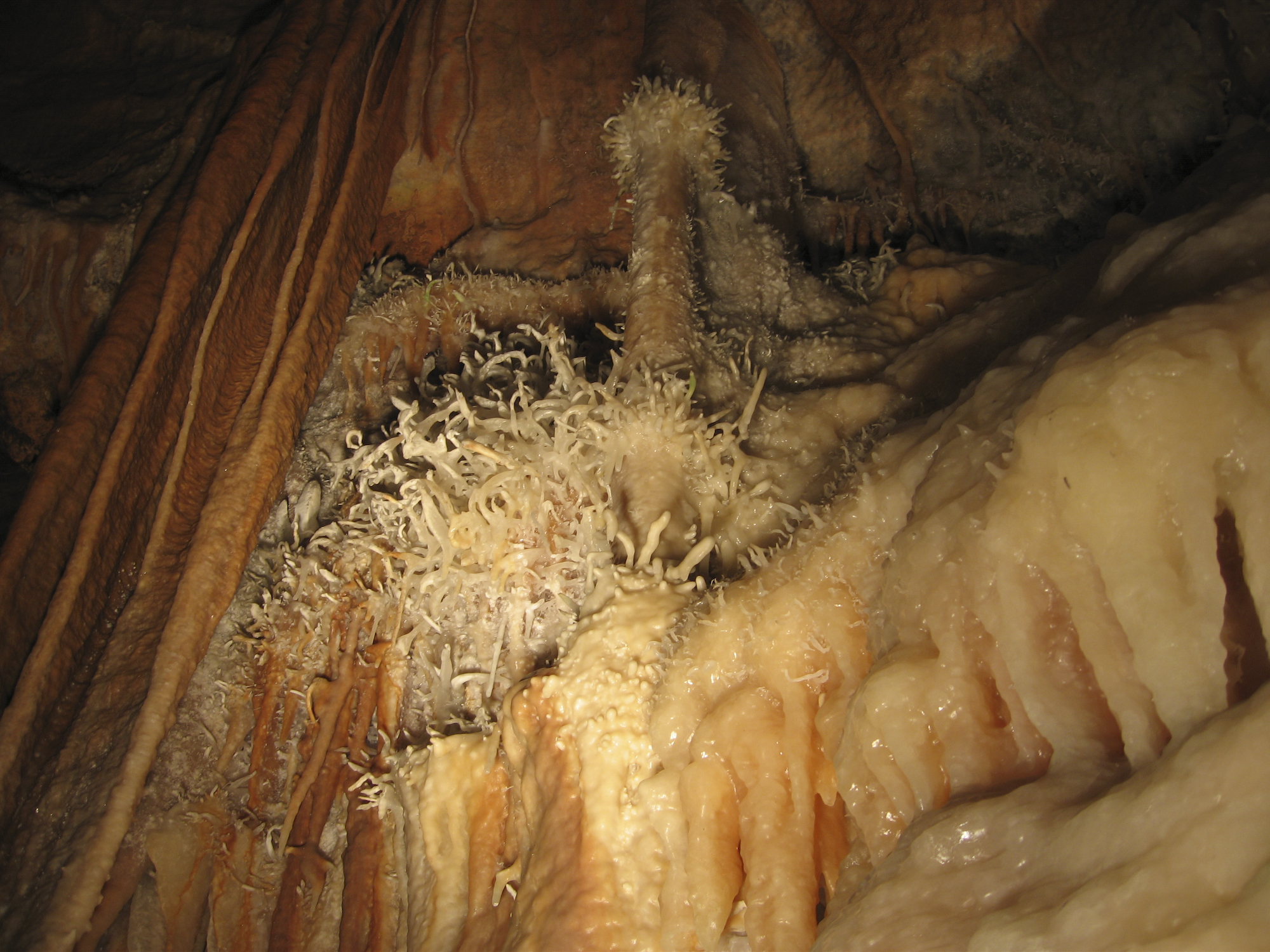
Helictites at Jenolan Caves in Australia

A helictite starts its growth as a tiny stalactite. The direction of the end of the straw may wander, twist like a corkscrew, or the main part may form normally while small helictites pop out of its side like rootlets or fishhooks. In some caves, helictites cluster together and form bushes as large as six feet tall. These bushes grow from the floor of the cave. When helictites are found on cave floors, they are referred to as heligmites, though there is debate as to whether this is a genuine subcategory.

For an unknown reason, when the chemical composition of the water is slightly altered, the single crystal structure can change from a cylindrical shape to a conical one. In some of these cases, each crystal fits into the prior one like an inverted stack of ice cream cones.

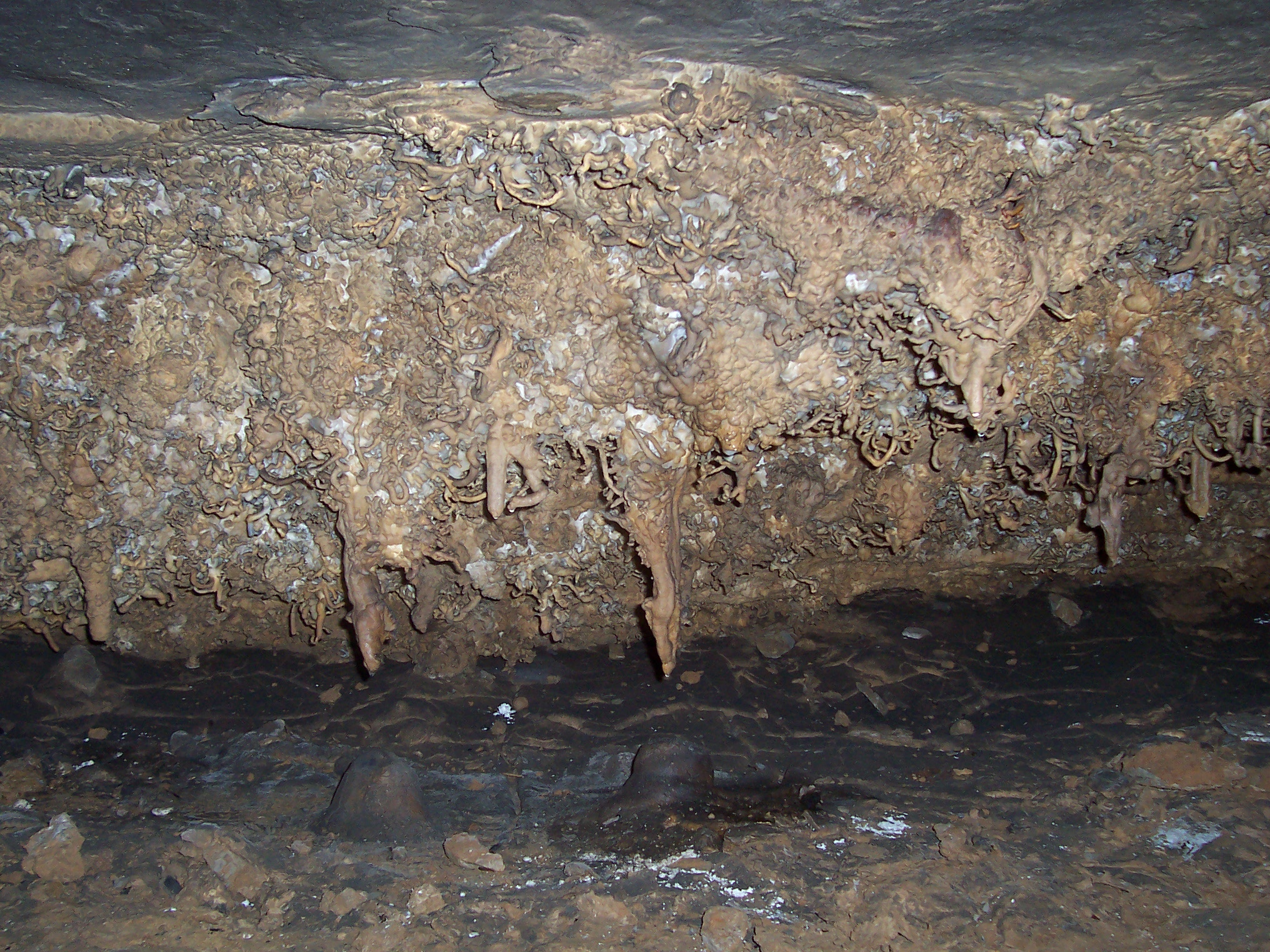
Helictite formations in Wyandotte Caves, Indiana, United States

== See also ==
- Anthodite
