= Suharău =

- Commune
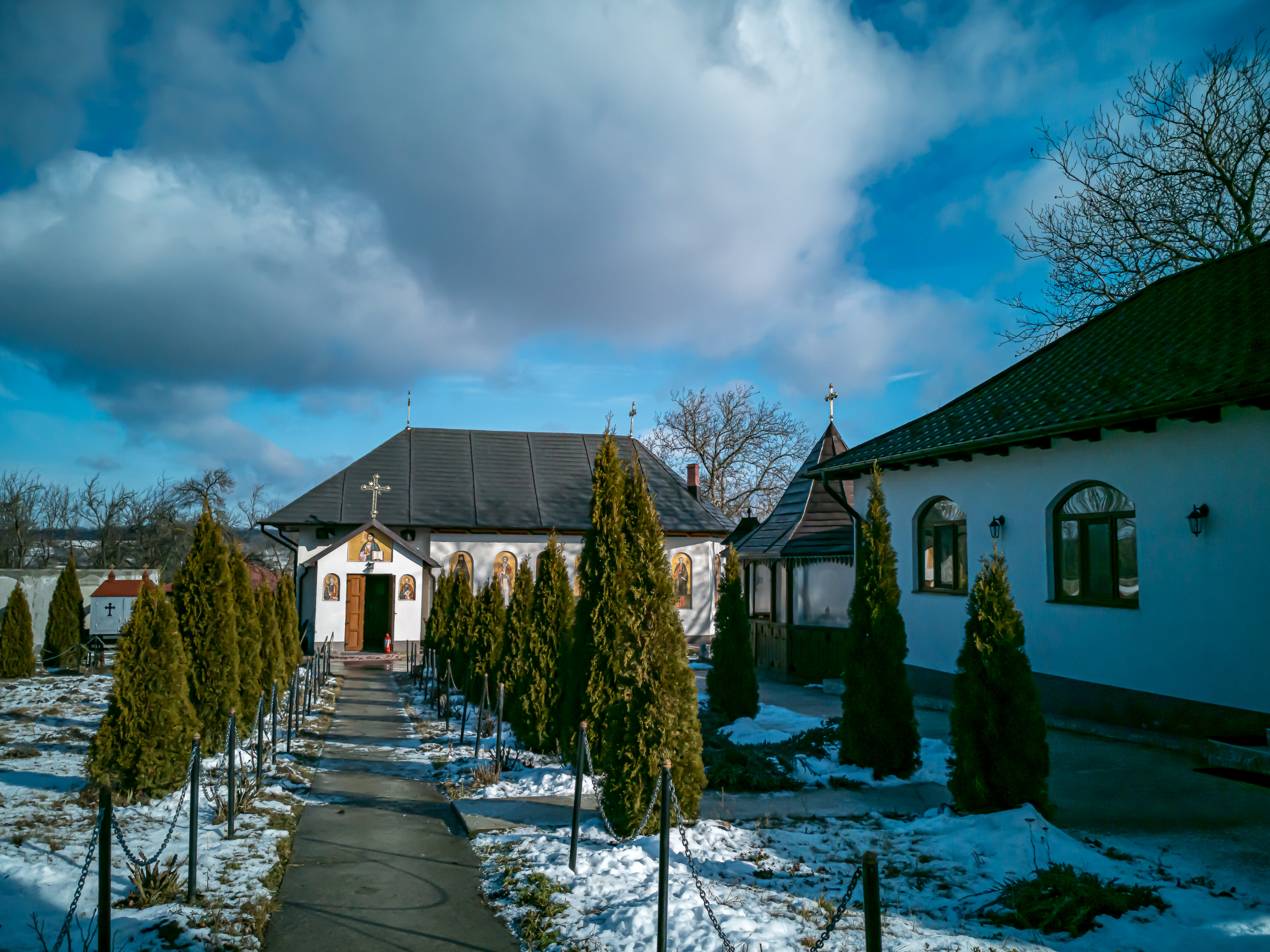
- Church of the Assumption of Virgin Mary in Comănești-Suharău

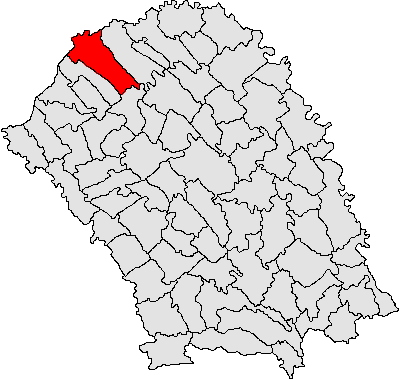
- Location in Botoșani County

- Location in Romania
- Coordinates: 48°08′N 26°25′E
- Country: Romania
- County: Botoșani
- Subdivisions: Izvoare, Lișna, Oroftiana, Plevna, Smârdan, Suharău

Government
  - Mayor (2024–2028): Marcel Chelariu (PSD)
- Area: 106.11 km^{2} (40.97 sq mi)
- Elevation: 202 m (663 ft)
- Population (2021-12-01): 3,811
  - Density: 35.92/km^{2} (93.02/sq mi)
- Time zone: UTC+02:00 (EET)
  - Summer (DST): UTC+03:00 (EEST)
- Postal code: 717360
- Area code: +(40) x31
- Vehicle reg.: BT
- Website: www.primariasuharau.ro

Suharău is a commune in Botoșani County, Western Moldavia, Romania. It is composed of six villages: Izvoare, Lișna, Oroftiana, Plevna, Smârdan, and Suharău.

The former village of Comănești is the oldest documented part of Suharău. Previously separate, in 1968, it was forcefully merged with Suharău, vanishing from the map and becoming Suharău II. Despite protests, this decision has never been undone.

The Prut enters Romania in Oroftiana village.

== Natives ==
- Mihai Chițac (1928–2010), general and Interior Minister from 1989 to 1990
