= Calul =

Calul may refer to the following rivers in Romania:

- Calu, a tributary of the Bicaz in Harghita County
- Calul (Bistrița), a tributary of the Bistrița in Neamț County
- Calul, a tributary of the Priboiasa in Vâlcea County

== See also ==
- Valea Calului (disambiguation)
