= Salva, Bistrița-Năsăud =

Salva
- Commune
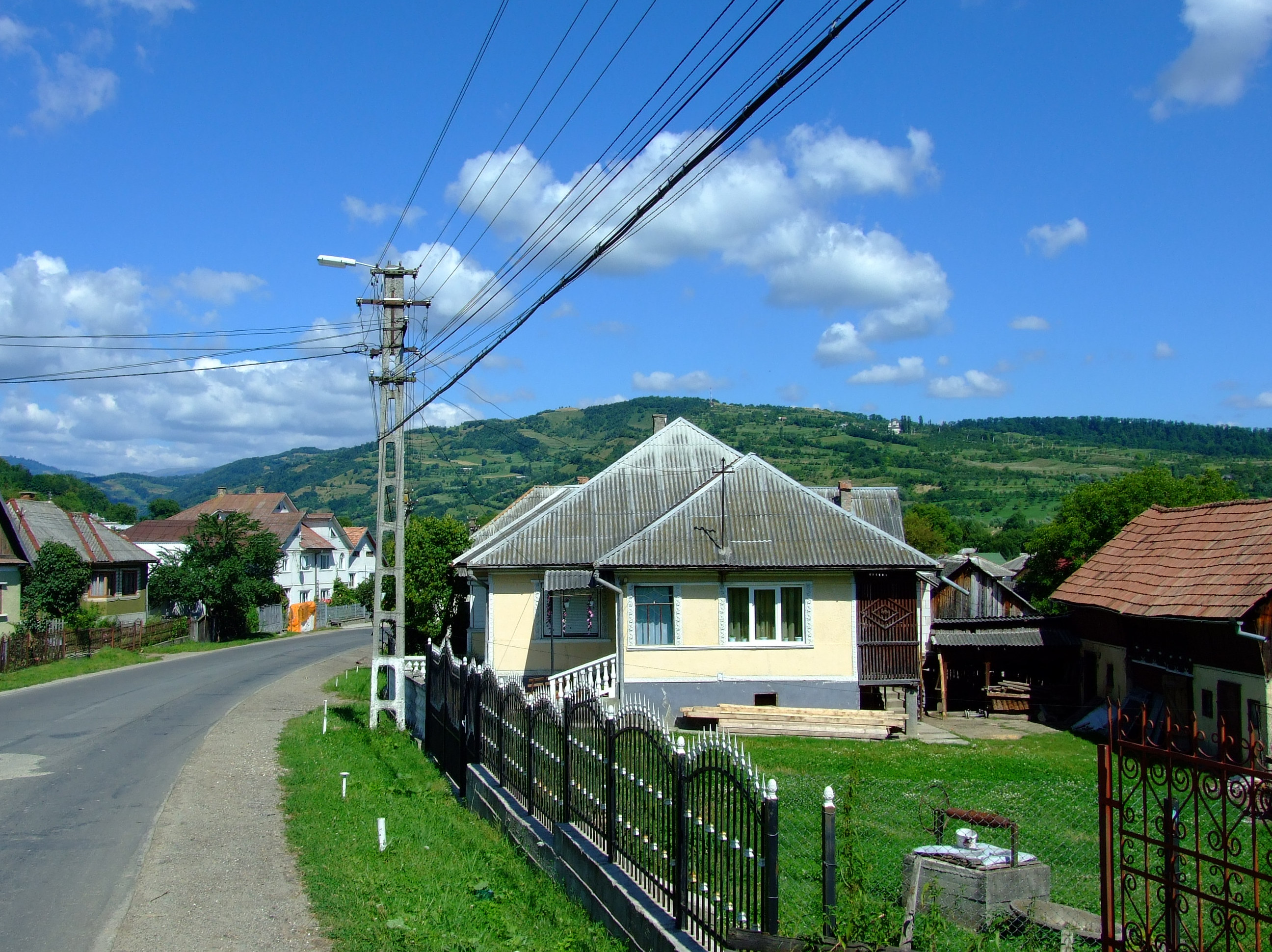

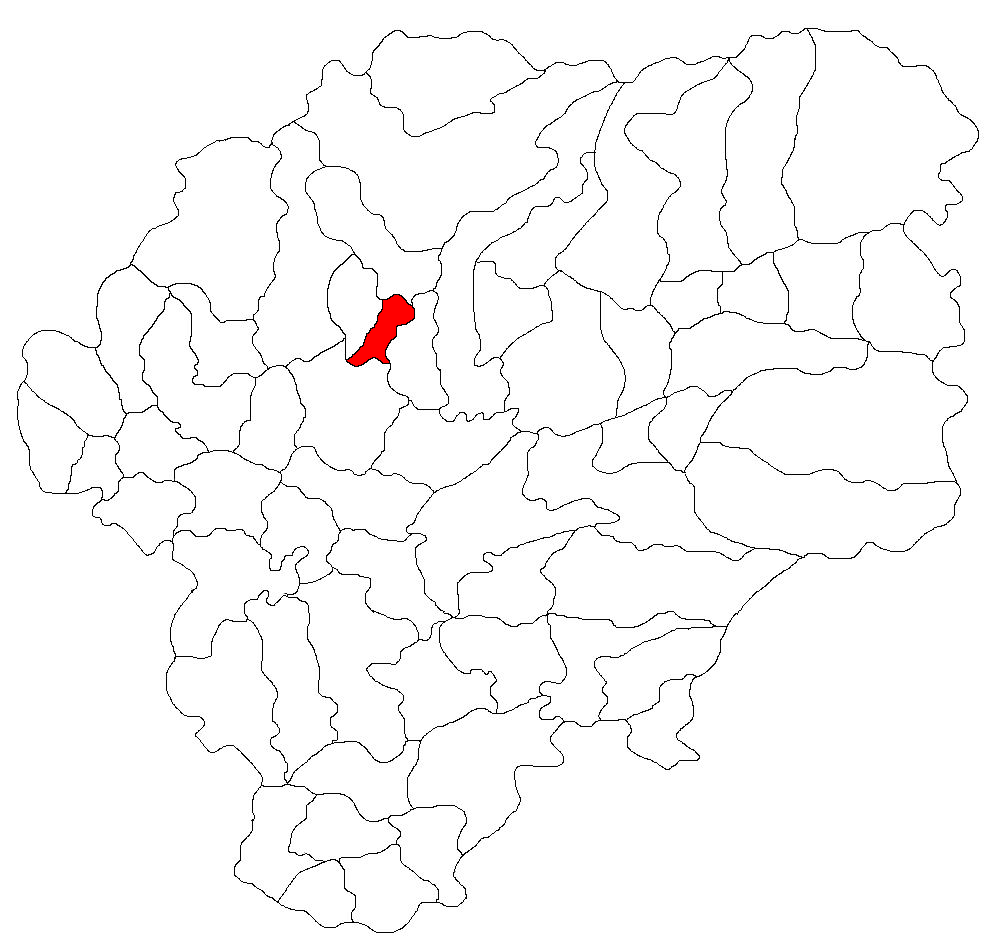
- Location in Bistrița-Năsăud County

- Location in Romania
- Coordinates: 47°18′N 24°21′E
- Country: Romania
- County: Bistrița-Năsăud

Government
  - Mayor (2020–2024): Gheorghe Onul (PSD)
- Area: 29.35 km^{2} (11.33 sq mi)
- Elevation: 313 m (1,027 ft)
- Population (2021-12-01): 2,491
  - Density: 84.87/km^{2} (219.8/sq mi)
- Time zone: UTC+02:00 (EET)
  - Summer (DST): UTC+03:00 (EEST)
- Postal code: 427255
- Area code: +40 263
- Vehicle reg.: BN
- Website: primariasalva.ro

Salva (Hungarian: Szálva, German: Salwa) is a commune in Bistrița-Năsăud County, Transylvania, Romania. It is composed of a single village, Salva, and included the village of Runcu Salvei until the it was split off to form a separate commune in 2005.

It is a relatively important local railway junction on the line to Sighetu Marmației and line to Vatra Dornei and Suceava.

== Natives ==
- Maria Butaciu (1940–2018), performer of Romanian transylvanian folklore music;
- Maria Peter (1925-2005), performer of Romanian transylvanian folklore music;
- Tănase Tudoran (1659-1763), martyr for the cause of the Năsăud military recruits, originally from the village of Bichigiu;
- Tiberiu I. Morariu (1905-1982), geographer, corresponding member of the Romanian Academy
