= Maria Butaciu =

Romanian singer (1940–2018)

- Born: February 19, 1940; Salva, Bistrița-Năsăud County, Kingdom of Romania
- Died: June 11, 2018 (aged 78); Bucharest, Romania
- Occupation: Singing
- Years active: 1961–2018

Maria Butaciu (February 19, 1940 – June 11, 2018) was a performer of Romanian folklore music of Transylvania.

== Early days ==
Butaciu was born in Salva, Bistrița-Năsăud County. She attended the Music High School in Cluj, where she started her musical career with the Cluj-Napoca Philharmonic Orchestra.

== Artistic career ==
On April 1, 1961, she came to the Ciocârlia Ensemble of the Ministry of Internal Affairs in Bucharest. Butaciu was a singer especially in the Bistrița-Năsăud area.

During her career she worked with conductors such as Constantin Arvinte, Ion Mărgean, Paraschiv Oprea, Victor Predescu, George Vancu, and Alexandru Viman.

In 2001 she was named "Honorary Citizen of Bucharest". Butaciu died in Bucharest on 11 June 2018 at the age of 78. She is buried at the Ghencea Military Cemetery.
