= Valeria Peter Predescu =

Romanian singer

- Born: 1947; Telciu, Bistrița-Năsăud County
- Origin: Romania
- Died: April 28, 2009 (62 years) Bistrița, Romania
- Occupation: Singer
- Instrument: Vocals
- Years active: 1970—2009
- Website: https://valeriapeterpredescu.blogspot.com/

Valeria Peter Predescu (1947 – April 28, 2009) was a Romanian popular singer. She was born in Telciu, Bistrița-Năsăud County. She died at 62 in Bistrița, having suffered a heart attack.
