= Mihai Chițac =

Romanian general (1928–2010)

Minister of the Interior
- In office 29 December 1989 – 16 June 1990
- Prime Minister: Petre Roman
- Preceded by: Tudor Postelnicu
- Succeeded by: Doru-Viorel Ursu

Personal details
- Born: November 4, 1928 Suharău, Botoșani County, Kingdom of Romania
- Died: November 1, 2010 (aged 81) Bucharest, Romania
- Resting place: Ghencea Cemetery, Bucharest
- Party: Romanian Communist Party
- Occupation: politician

Mihai Chițac (November 4, 1928 – November 1, 2010) was a Romanian general and Interior Minister from 1989 to 1990 during the waning days of the Communist era. In 2008, Chițac and another general, Victor Stănculescu, were convicted of aggravated manslaughter by the Supreme Court for the shooting deaths of pro-democracy protesters during the Romanian Revolution of 1989.

Communist Romanian security forces fired live ammunition at protesters and civilians between December 17 and 20, 1989, killing 72 civilians and injuring 253 others. Generals Chițac and Stănculescu were originally convicted and sentenced for multiple aggravated murder charges during a 1999 trial. The trial had found both guilty of ordering troops and security forces to shoot pro-democracy and anti-communist protesters in Timișoara. Chițac's prison terms were discontinued on six occasions due to deteriorating health.

The Romanian Supreme Court further sentenced Chițac and Stănculescu to fifteen years in prison for aggravated manslaughter on October 16, 2008.

Chiţac was admitted to Bucharest Military Hospital on September 19, 2010, for cardiac problems and tumors discovered that same month. He died at his home in Bucharest at 10 a.m. on November 1, 2010. He is buried at Ghencea Military Cemetery.
