= Tudor Postelnicu =

Romanian politician

Minister of Internal Affairs
- In office October 5, 1987 – December 22, 1989
- President: Nicolae Ceaușescu
- Preceded by: George Homoștean
- Succeeded by: Mihai Chițac

Director General of the Securitate
- In office March 1978 – October 1987
- Preceded by: Nicolae Doicaru
- Succeeded by: Iulian Vlad

Personal details
- Born: 13 November 1931 Provița de Sus, Prahova County, Kingdom of Romania
- Died: 12 August 2017 (aged 85) Bucharest, Romania
- Party: Romanian Communist Party
- Occupation: Politician

Tudor Postelnicu (13 November 1931 – 12 August 2017) was a Romanian Communist politician, who served as Director of the Securitate from March 1978 to October 1987, and then as Interior Minister until the 1989 Revolution.

== Biography ==
Born in Provița de Sus, Prahova County, he left school after the sixth grade in 1943. Until 1947, he was an apprentice at a foundry in Moreni, subsequently working there as an iron lathe operator until 1951. He joined the Romanian Communist Party's (PCR; later PMR and then PCR again) Union of Communist Youth (UTC; later UTM) in 1945, a year after the August 1944 coup d'état brought the party out of illegality. From 1950 to 1951, he was secretary of his factory UTM committee; from 1954 to 1956, he was first secretary of the Câmpina raion UTM committee; and from 1956 to 1959, he was secretary of the Ploiești regional UTM committee. From 1956 to 1960, he belonged to the UTM's central committee for revision. In 1959, he became an adjunct member of the bureau of the UTM's central committee, also serving as head of its organisational section; he became a full member of the bureau in 1962. Additionally, he sat on the UTM's central committee from 1960 to 1964.

Postelnicu furthered his education at the cadre school of the UTM's central committee, finishing in 1954; at the Ștefan Gheorghiu Academy, which he graduated in 1967; and at the Bucharest Academy of Economic Studies, where he took equivalence examinations and entered the doctoral programme in 1977.

After joining the PMR in 1953, Postelnicu was promoted through its ranks. He first became an instructor at its mass organisation section; holding the same job at the central committee's organisational section from 1964 to 1969. He was secretary of the Olt County party committee from 1969 to 1971, and then from 1971 to 1976 secretary of the Buzău County party committee. From 1976 to 1978, he was first secretary in the same county, and president of the executive committee of its people's council (equivalent to today's county councils). In 1971 he was awarded the Order of the Star of the Romanian Socialist Republic, 4th class.

From March 1978 to October 1987, Postelnicu headed the country's secret police, the Securitate, holding ministerial rank as a secretary of state. In this capacity, he orchestrated a campaign against the dissident writer Paul Goma, who had left the country in 1977, with the goal of discrediting him in Romania and abroad. The aim was to depict Goma as an agent of foreign powers and Hungarian irredentists, while among Iron Guard circles in Western Europe and the United States, Goma would be presented as being under Mossad influence obtained through his Jewish father-in-law.

Following his Securitate stint, he served as Interior Minister in the Constantin Dăscălescu cabinet. In November 1979, he joined the PCR's central committee, and was a supplementary member of its political executive committee (CPEx) from November 1984 to December 1989. He also sat in the Great National Assembly for Teleorman and then Prahova County from March 1980 to December 1989. Political scientist Vladimir Tismăneanu describes him as part of a group of "deeply subservient" and "utterly incompetent" figures with whom dictator Nicolae Ceaușescu surrounded himself in the 1980s.

Postelnicu was arrested during the 1989 Revolution, on the night of 22–23 December. Tried at the Bucharest Military Tribunal, he was sentenced in February 1990 to life imprisonment and confiscation of all his personal property, for complicity in genocide.

The well-publicised proceedings have been described as a "show trial"; Postelnicu and three other prominent defendants pleaded guilty after delivering rehearsed, self-critical testimony that they later renounced. The phrase he used to explain his actions became famous: "Am fost un dobitoc!" ("I was an idiot"). In April 1993, upon a request by the state prosecutor, the Supreme Court of Justice annulled the earlier sentence, instead convicting him of complicity in aggravated manslaughter and attempted manslaughter, and reducing his sentence to seven years' imprisonment and eight years' deprivation of civic rights. That month, a new trial began; he and eight others were charged with carrying out Ceaușescu's orders for the summary execution of three people who attempted to hijack a bus to the West in 1981. The Bucharest Military Tribunal convicted all nine in 1993. In 1994, the court accepted his personal request for conditional release on grounds of health. He was again incarcerated from January 1998 to October 1999, when he was granted conditional release a second time. Postelnicu died at the Carol Davila Military Hospital in Bucharest in 2017, following a long illness that left him attached to a ventilator near the end of his life. He was buried at Ghencea Cemetery.
