= Skyline Caverns =

Cave in Warren County, Virginia, United States

- Location within Shenandoah Valley Location within Virginia Location within the United States
- Type: Natural area
- Coordinates: 38°53′59″N 78°12′58″W
- Created: 1939

Skyline Caverns is a series of geologic caves and a tourist attraction located in Warren County, Virginia, one mile (1.6 km) south of Front Royal. The caverns were discovered by Walter S. Amos, a retired geologist and mineralogist from Winchester, Virginia, on December 17, 1937. Skyline Caverns is open year-round, offering guided tours through the caverns.

== History ==
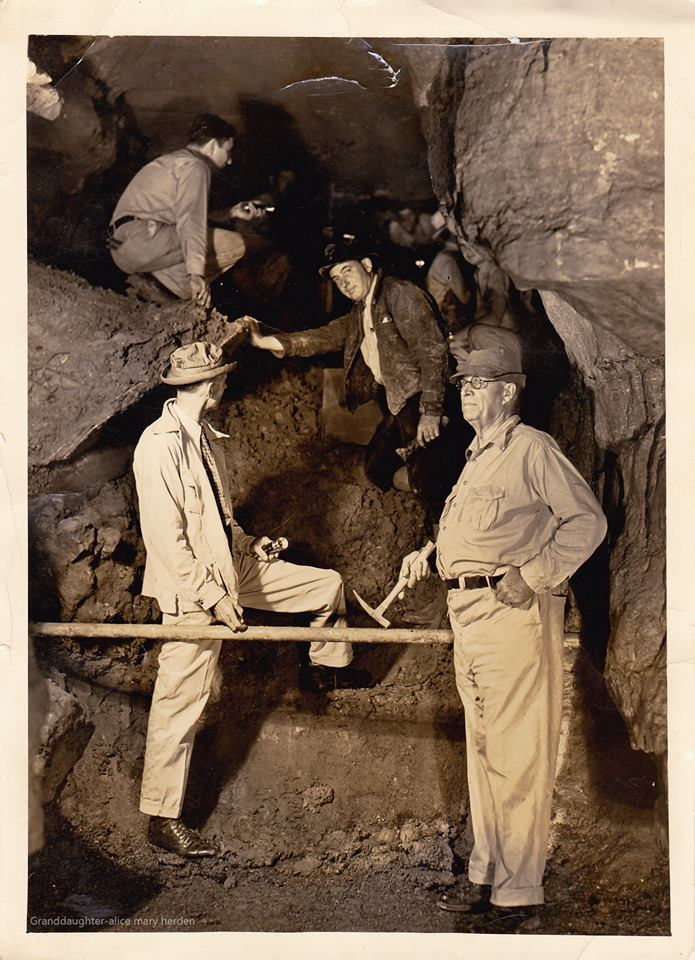
Walter Scott Amos at Skyline Caverns surrounded by workers, 1939

Walter S. Amos was contracted by several private and government agencies to search for caves and caverns to open in conjunction with Skyline Drive. During his search, he came across a sinkhole that was located approximately where the parking lot is currently situated. Normally, sinkholes are formed by the collapsing of a cavern roof, which takes the ground above with it. When he saw there was no water in the sinkhole, which meant there had to be a drain nearby, he believed he had discovered a cavern.

Knowing this, Amos began to search the edges for some opening to the possible cave system below. He found this opening on the lip of the sinkhole by noticing a small colony of camel crickets (which only live in damp, dark areas by nature) under a small ledge.

Upon digging out the first "room" of the caverns, he came into a large system of connected rooms, most of which were navigable and cleared from all obstructions. Ninety percent of the caverns were naturally accessible and other than the entrance area, only ten percent needed to be dug out. However, the cavern floor was lined with approximately 14 inches (360 mm) of mud and clay, which had to be cleared before the caverns could be opened to the public on April 13, 1939. The use of scientific analysis makes the discovery of Skyline Caverns extremely unusual.

The caverns are estimated to be approximately 50 to 60 million years old.

== Anthodites ==
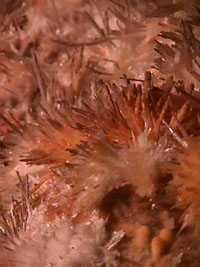
Anthodite

During the clearing of this mud, Amos and his men discovered another area in the caverns that had been blocked for many years, by a large amount of mud. Upon clearing the newly discovered area, the geologist discovered anthodites. Anthodites are an unusual form of crystal, or perfect six-sided crystalline structures made of pure calcite. These crystals are protected by Virginia State Law and are kept behind closed doors that a tour guide must open for the public to view them.

== Commercial operation ==
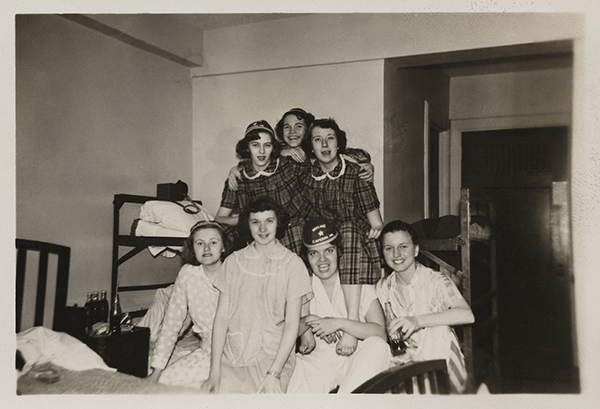
Jefferson Medical College Hospital School of Nursing students wearing Skyline Caverns beanies c.1951

Today, guided tours (as opposed to self-guided tours) are given year-round, including on Christmas Day. Tours depart every 15 to 20 minutes, lasting approximately one hour and cover about 1 1/8 miles (1.8 km) of walking, and reaching a depth of 260 feet (79 m) below ground. Tours cover about twenty percent of the caverns; the remaining eighty percent is inaccessible to tourists. Cavern formations visible on the tour include stalactites, stalagmites, columns, "flow-stone", anthodites, and aragonites. Skyline Caverns also features five flowing streams, three of which are visible on the tour.

Additional attractions include a miniature train ride and mirror maze.
