= Fiad (river) =

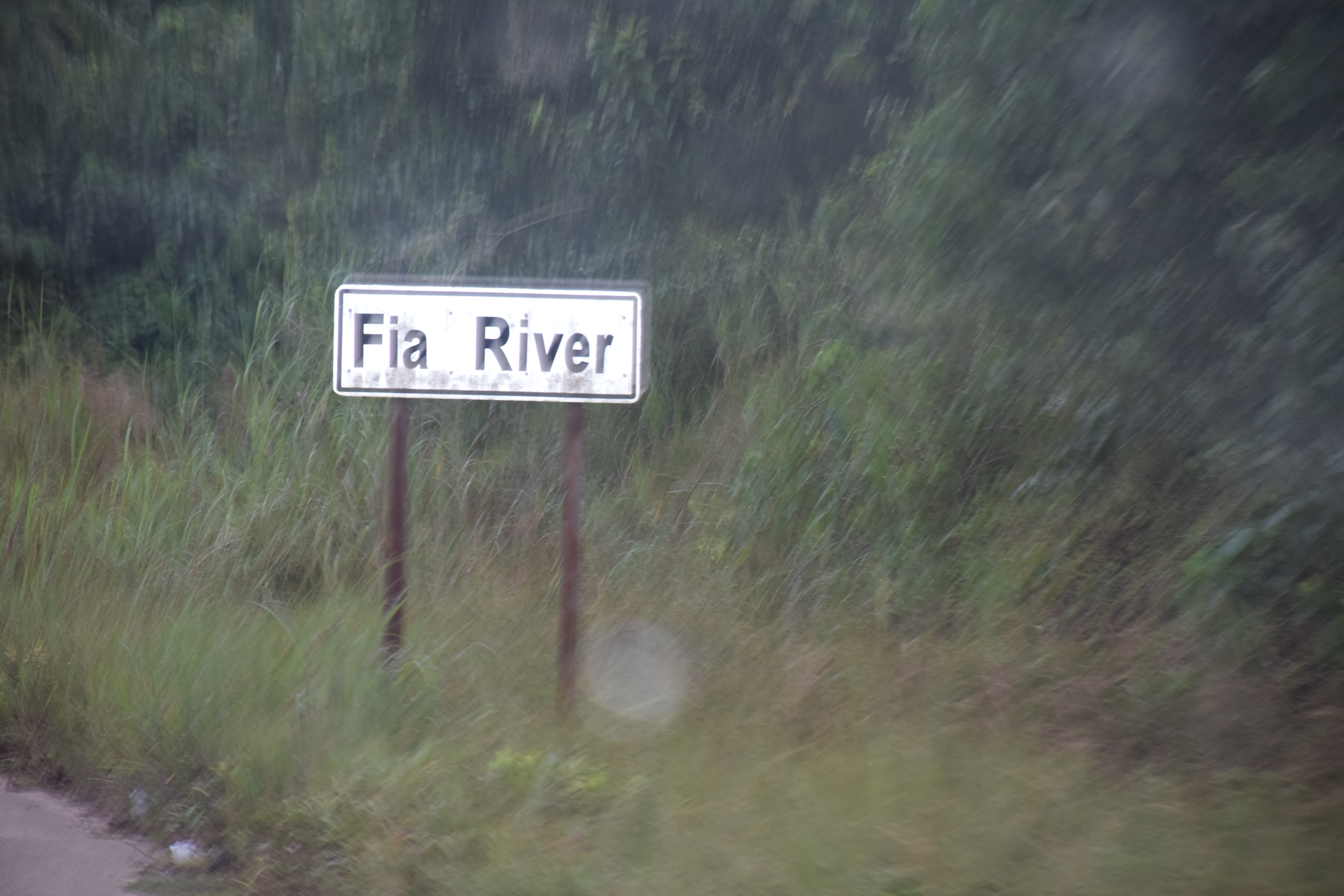

- Location within Romania

Location
- Country: Romania
- Counties: Bistrița-Năsăud County

Physical characteristics
- Source: Țibleș Mountains
- Mouth: Sălăuța
  - location: Fiad
  - coordinates: 47.4873°N 24.3846°E
- Length: 16 km (9.9 mi)
- Basin size: 61 km^{2} (24 sq mi)

Basin features
- Progression: Sălăuța→ Someșul Mare→ Someș→ Tisza→ Danube→ Black Sea
- Tributaries
  - right: Mesteacăn, Seradia, Valea Calului

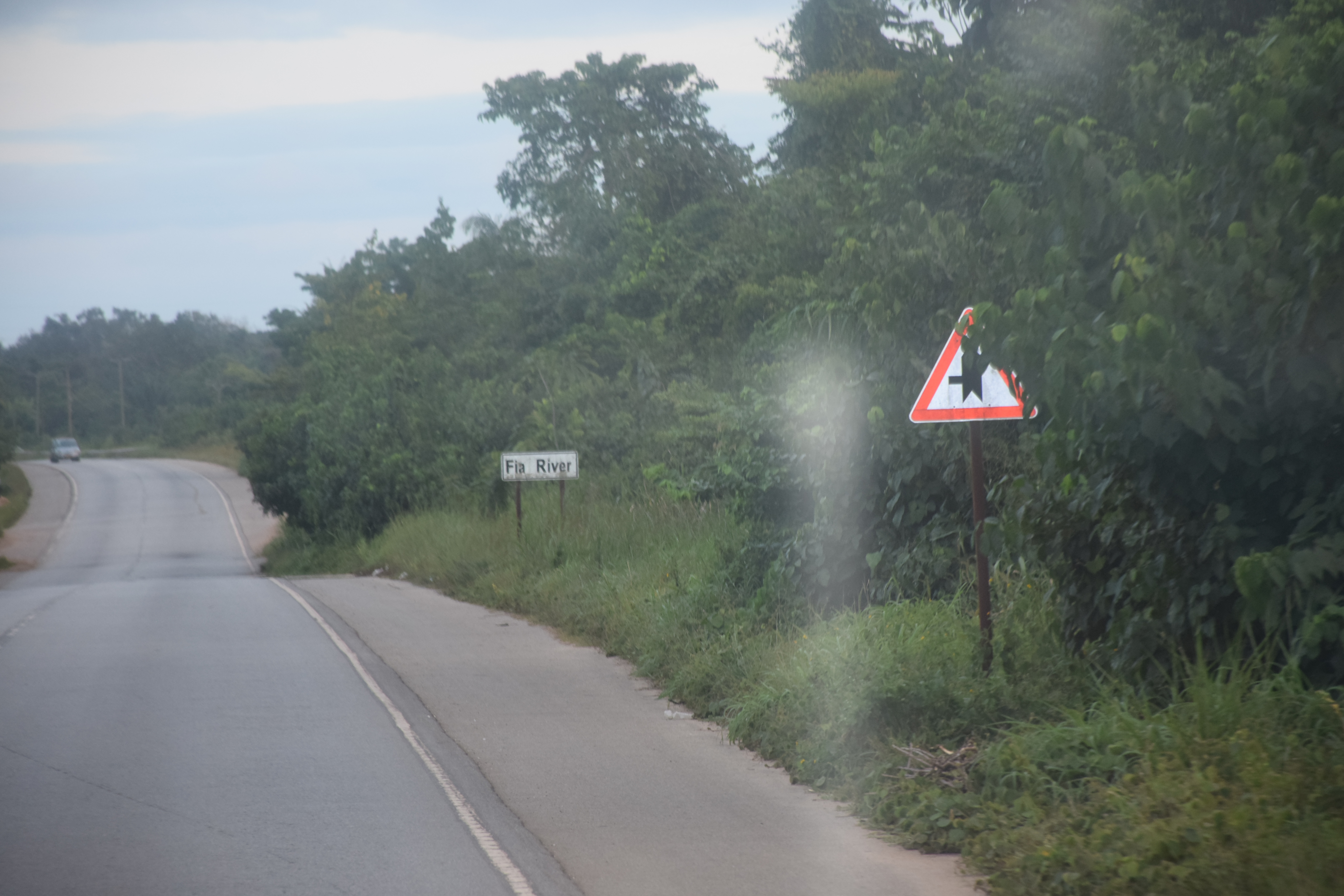
Fia River au Ghana

The Fiad is a right tributary of the river Sălăuța in Romania. It flows into the Sălăuța in the village Fiad. Its length is 16 km (9.9 mi) and its basin size is 61 km^{2} (24 sq mi).
