= Anthodite =

Speleothems composed of long needle-like crystals situated in clusters

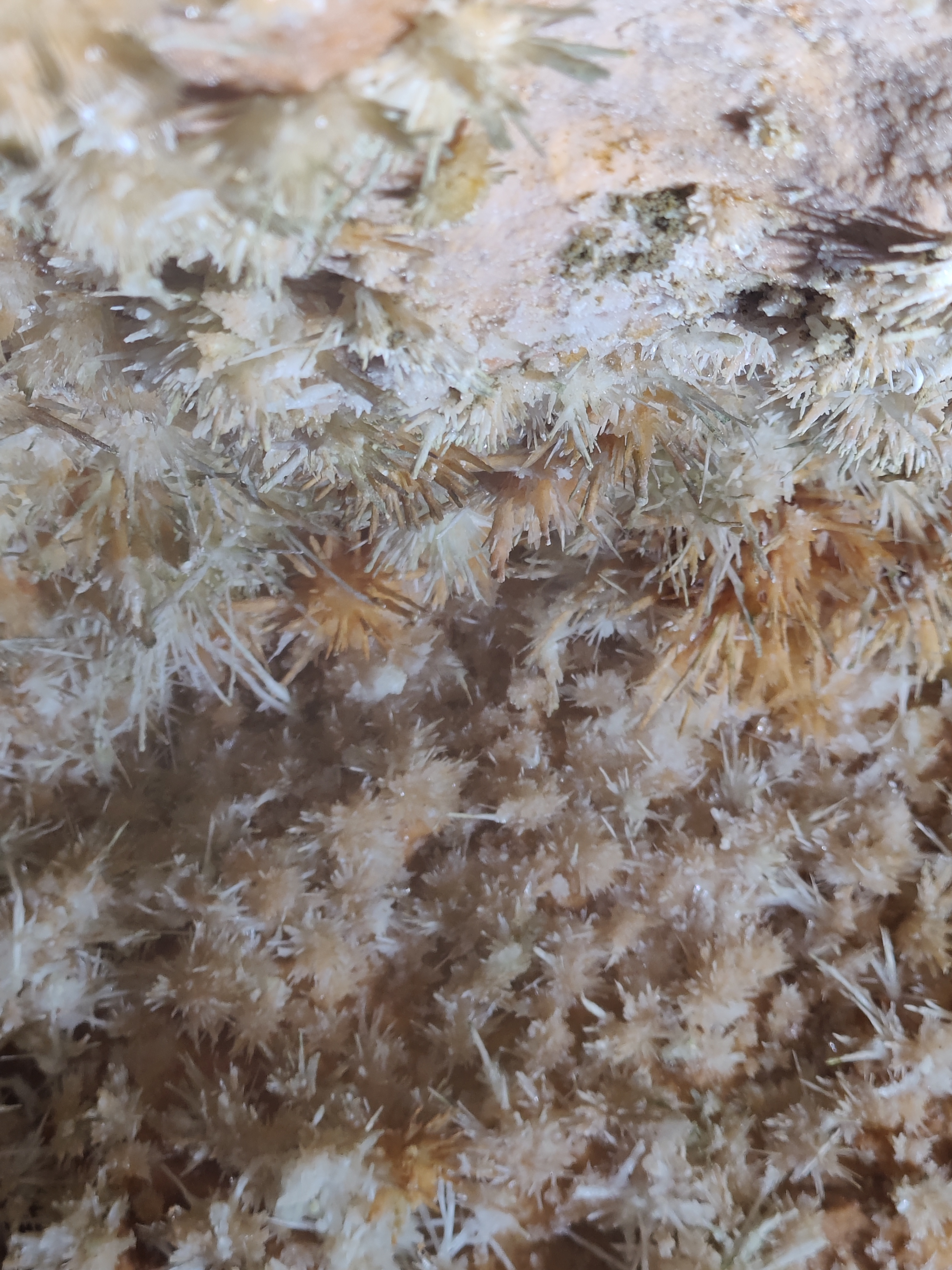
Anthodites are featured at the commercial Skyline Caverns in Virginia, US

Anthodites (Greek ἄνθος ánthos, "flower", -ode, adjectival combining form, -ite adjectival suffix) are speleothems (cave formations) composed of long needle-like crystals situated in clusters which radiate outward from a common base. The "needles" may be quill-like or feathery. Most anthodites are made of the mineral aragonite (a variety of calcium carbonate, CaCO_{3}), although some are composed of gypsum (CaSO_{4}·2H_{2}O).

The term anthodite is first cited in the scientific literature in 1965 by Japanese researcher N. Kashima, who described "flower-like dripstone" composed of "an alternation of calcite and aragonite".

== Structure, composition and appearance ==
The individual crystals of anthodites develop in a form described as "acicular" (needle-like) and often branch out as they grow. They usually grow downward from a cave's ceiling. Aragonite crystals are contrasted with those made of calcite (another variety of calcium carbonate) in that the latter tend to be stubby or dog-tooth-like ("rhombohedral", rather than acicular). Anthodites often have a solid core of aragonite and may have huntite or hydromagnesite deposited near the ends of the branches.

Anthodite crystals vary in size from less than a millimeter to about a meter, but are commonly between 1 and 20 millimeters in length.

== Occurrence ==
Anthodites may occur sporadically throughout some limestone caves, but may be spectacularly abundant in others, with clean white crystals growing all over the calcite or other rock surfaces. Examples of sites with abundant anthodite displays include Carlsbad Caverns, Craighead Caverns, Skyline Caverns in the United States and the Grotte de Moulis in France. Anthodites can also be found in the National Monument of Timpanogos Cave, American Fork, Utah.

== Types ==
Among the "quill-like" varieties of anthodite is sometimes included the "sea urchin-like" formation known as flos ferri, although others have considered them a slender variety of helictite.

Among the "feathery" varieties of anthodite is "frostwork", a type of speleothem consisting of "bushes" of fine acicular aragonite crystals in radiating clusters. Their appearance is often compared to that of a cactus or thistle plant. In its composite stalagmite form, frostwork may possess spiny limbs like a miniature fir tree. The term was first used by cave guides at Wind Cave in South Dakota, USA, during the 1890s to describe speleothems which looked like ice "frostwork".

== Anthodite-like formations ==
- Helictites are curved or angular twig-like lateral projections of calcium carbonate, which appear to defy gravity. Rather than radial clusters, helictites often occur in tangled masses. The "twigs" have a tiny central canal.
- Cave flowers (also known as "gypsum flowers" or "oulopholites") consist of gypsum or epsomite. In contrast to anthodites, the needles or "petals" of cave flowers grow from the attached end.
- Cave cotton (also called "gypsum cotton") is very thin, flexible filaments of gypsum or epsomite projecting from a cave wall.
