= Provița de Sus =

- Commune
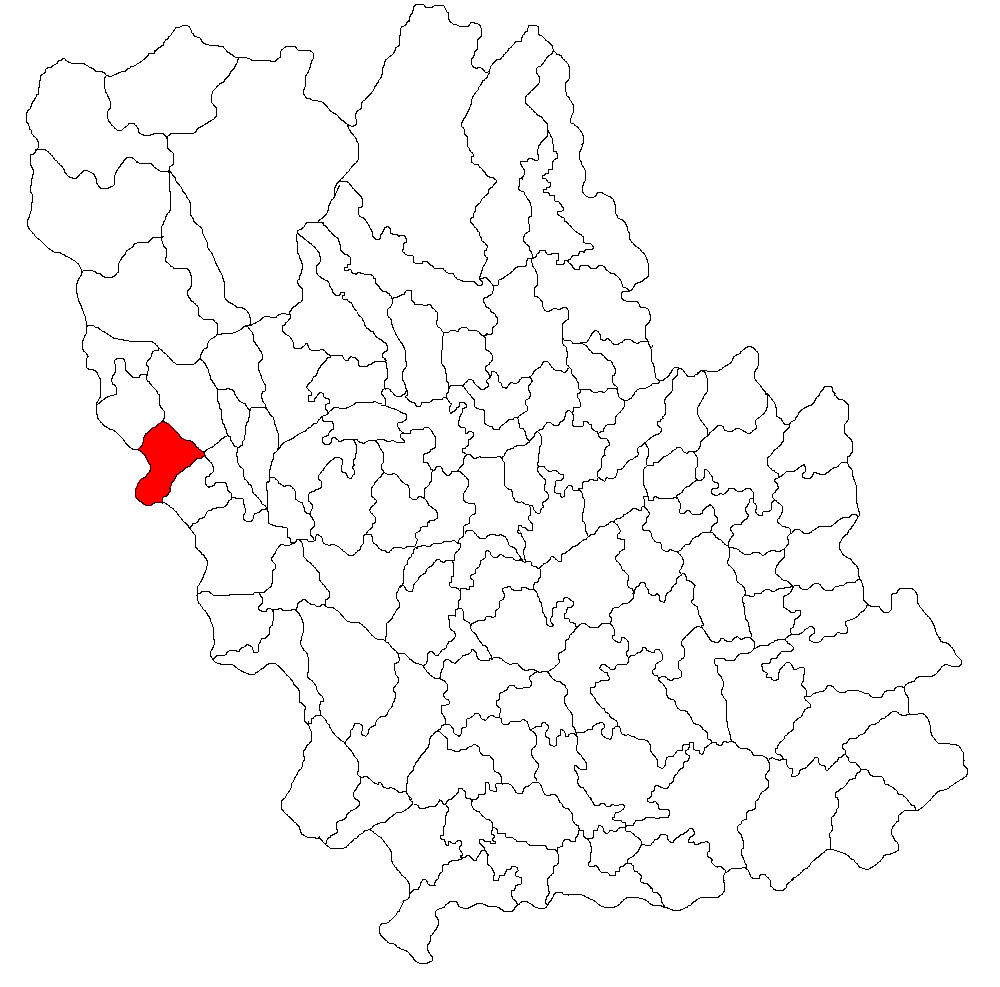
- Location in Prahova County

- Location in Romania
- Coordinates: 45°8′N 25°38′E
- Country: Romania
- County: Prahova

Government
  - Mayor (2020–2024): Tarcisius Ovidiu Ioan Movileanu (PSD)
- Elevation: 447 m (1,467 ft)
- Population (2021-12-01): 1,719
- Time zone: EET/EEST (UTC+2/+3)
- Postal code: 107480
- Area code: +(40) 244
- Vehicle reg.: PH
- Website: www.primariaprovitadesus.ro

Provița de Sus is a commune in Prahova County, Muntenia, Romania. It is composed of four villages: Izvoru, Plaiu, Provița de Sus, and Valea Bradului.

Historical population
Year	Pop.	±%
2002	2,369	—
2011	2,042	−13.8%
2021	1,719	−15.8%
Source: Census data

== Natives ==
- Tudor Postelnicu (1931–2017), communist politician, who served as Director of the Securitate and then as Interior Minister
