= Runcu Salvei =

- Commune
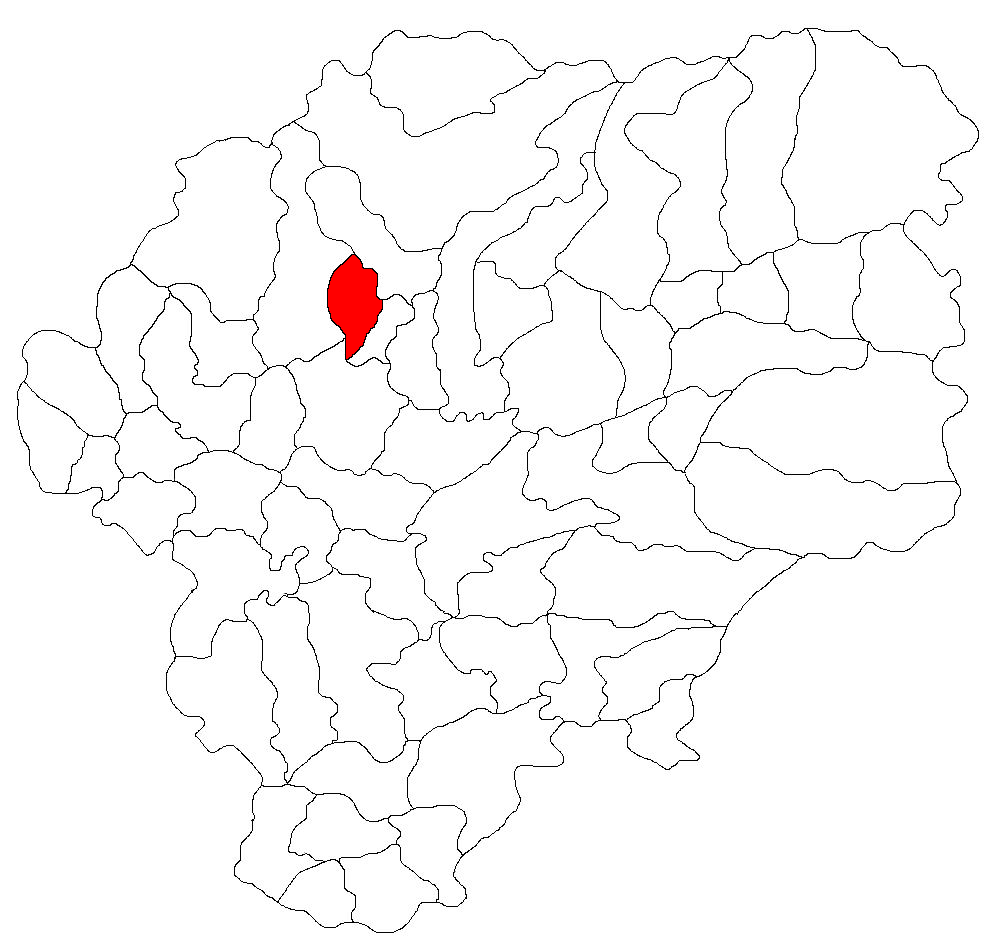
- Location in Bistrița-Năsăud County

- Location in Romania
- Coordinates: 47°21′N 24°19′E
- Country: Romania
- County: Bistrița-Năsăud
- Area: 25.61 km^{2} (9.89 sq mi)
- Population (2021-12-01): 1,229
  - Density: 47.99/km^{2} (124.3/sq mi)
- Time zone: UTC+02:00 (EET)
  - Summer (DST): UTC+03:00 (EEST)
- Vehicle reg.: BN

Runcu Salvei (Hungarian: Runk; German: Runck) is a commune in Bistrița-Năsăud County, Transylvania, Romania. It is composed of a single village, Runcu Salvei, and was part of Salva Commune until 2005, when it was split off.
