= Déprimisme =

French art and literary movement

Déprimisme ("depressionism") is a present-day French art and literary movement, in which authors dwell on the failures of society. The movement can be identified as a cross between expressionism and symbolism. Originally a French movement, the term has later been extended to refer to direct commentary on any contemporary, particularly western or American culture. In a general sense, "depressionism" is the practice of manipulating social ideas and conventions in such a way as to elicit an emotional or intellectual effect from the audience.

For example, in a painting of this genre, the artist would use the actual physical texture and form of a painting to depict not only the subject matter, but the implied emotional state of the subject in their environment. The resulting painting is ultimately a distortion of reality intermingled with social commentary. Michel Houellebecq's 1998 novel The Elementary Particles is considered a primary work.
