= Gogoșu, Dolj =

Gogoșu
- Commune
- Location in Romania
- Coordinates: 44°25′N 23°22′E
- Country: Romania
- County: Dolj

Government
  - Mayor (2020–2024): Janin Cristian Bărăgan (PNL)
- Area: 34.27 km^{2} (13.23 sq mi)
- Elevation: 179 m (587 ft)
- Population (2021-12-01): 523
  - Density: 15/km^{2} (40/sq mi)
- Time zone: EET/EEST (UTC+2/+3)
- Postal code: 207010
- Area code: +(40) 251
- Vehicle reg.: DJ
- Website: primariagogosu.ro

Gogoșu is a commune in Dolj County, Oltenia, Romania with a population of 523 people as of 2021. It is composed of three villages: Gogoșița, Gogoșu, and Ștefănel.

Historical population
| Year | Pop. | ±% |
|---|---|---|
| 2002 | 1,029 | — |
| 2011 | 723 | −29.7% |
| 2021 | 523 | −27.7% |
Source: Census data

== Natives ==
- Iulian Vlad (1931–2017), last director of the Securitate secret police force from 1987 to 1989
