= Iulian Vlad =

Romanian government official

Colonel General Iulian Vlad
- Vlad as a colonel general

Director General of the Securitate
- In office 5 October 1987 – 22 December 1989
- President: Nicolae Ceaușescu
- Preceded by: Tudor Postelnicu
- Succeeded by: Office abolished

Member of the Great National Assembly
- In office 22 November 1984 – 22 December 1989
- Constituency: Domnești

Personal details
- Born: 21 February 1931 Gogoșița, Kingdom of Romania
- Died: 30 September 2017 (aged 86) Bucharest, Romania
- Party: Romanian Communist Party
- Occupation: Politician

Military service
- Allegiance: Socialist Republic of Romania
- Branch/service: Securitate
- Years of service: 1951–1989
- Rank: Colonel general
- Battles/wars: Romanian revolution

Iulian Vlad (yool-YAHN vlahd; 21 February 1931 – 30 September 2017) was a Romanian government official and last director of the Securitate secret police force from 1987 to 1989. He was the Securitate's director during the Romanian revolution.

== Early life ==
Iulian Vlad was born on 21 February 1931 in Gogoșița in the Kingdom of Romania. His parents were Nicolae and Eugenia Vlad. Vlad joined the Romanian Communist Party in 1946 at the age of 15. He attended the University of Bucharest and later graduated from the Serbian Marxist-Leninist University.

== Security career ==
Vlad became an employee for the Securitate, the secret police force of Socialist Republic of Romania, in 1951. During Nicolae Ceaușescu's rule, Vlad became a military education specialist in the Ministry of Internal Affairs. In 1977, Vlad became the director of counterintelligence. In 1983, Vlad served as the deputy minister of internal affairs. On 22 November 1984, Vlad became a member of the Great National Assembly representing Domnești. The following month, he was given the rank of colonel general. On 5 October 1987, Vlad was appointed as the director of the Securitate, succeeding Tudor Postelnicu.

During the 1989 Romanian revolution, Vlad pledged his allegiance to Ceaușescu and ordered the Securitate to crush anti-Ceaușescu protestors, imprisoning and killing many in the process. Ceaușescu ordered forces loyal to his government to fire live ammunition at protestors, but Vlad had Securitate forces use blank rounds instead. Vlad later proclaimed that he had joined the revolutionaries' side, but his loyalty was questioned as he did not order Securitate forces to stop attacking the protestors. The revolution was ultimately successful. On 26 December 1989, Vlad was arrested and removed from his positions as director of the Securitate and as a member of the Great National Assembly.

Vlad was charged with "complicity to genocide" and faced life imprisonment, but the chargers were later downgraded to "favoring genocide". Vlad was convicted and sentenced to nine years imprisonment in 1991 and had his rank of colonel general revoked. He appealed the conviction but it was upheld. In 1992, he was further convicted of "aggravative murder" and sentenced to three years' imprisonment. Vlad served four years of his sentenced before being released in 1994.

== Later life and death ==
After Vlad's release from prison, he participated in business negotiations between Romania and China.

Vlad died on 30 September 2017 to cancer.

Government offices
Preceded by Tudor Postelnicu	Director General of the Securitate	Office abolished
