= Coșbuc, Bistrița-Năsăud =

Coșbuc
- Commune
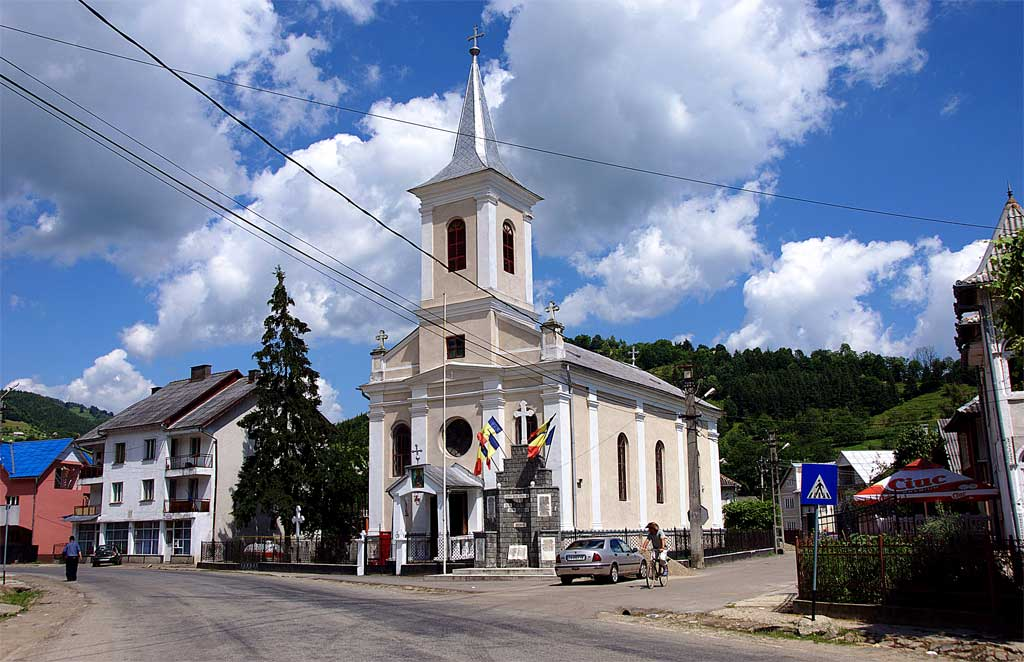
- Church in Coșbuc

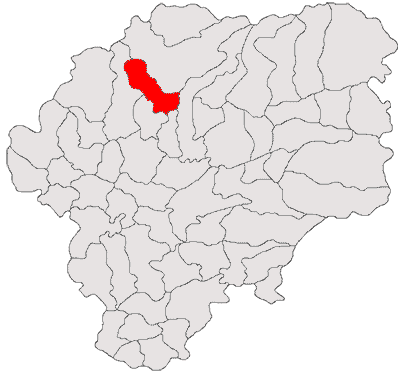
- Location in Bistrița-Năsăud County

- Location in Romania
- Coordinates: 47°21′47″N 24°23′24″E
- Country: Romania
- County: Bistrița-Năsăud

Government
  - Mayor (2020–2024): Ioan Pavelea (PSD)
- Area: 91.96 km^{2} (35.51 sq mi)
- Elevation: 362 m (1,188 ft)
- Population (2021-12-01): 1,738
  - Density: 18.90/km^{2} (48.95/sq mi)
- Time zone: UTC+02:00 (EET)
  - Summer (DST): UTC+03:00 (EEST)
- Postal code: 427070
- Area code: (+40) 02 63
- Vehicle reg.: BN
- Website: primariacosbuc.ro

Coșbuc (until 1925 Hordou; Hungarian: Hordó; German: Faassendorf) is a commune in Bistrița-Năsăud County, Transylvania, Romania. Since the village of Bichigiu was transferred to Telciu commune in 2004, Coșbuc remains the commune's only village.

The poet George Coșbuc was born here in 1866.
