= Telciu =

- Commune
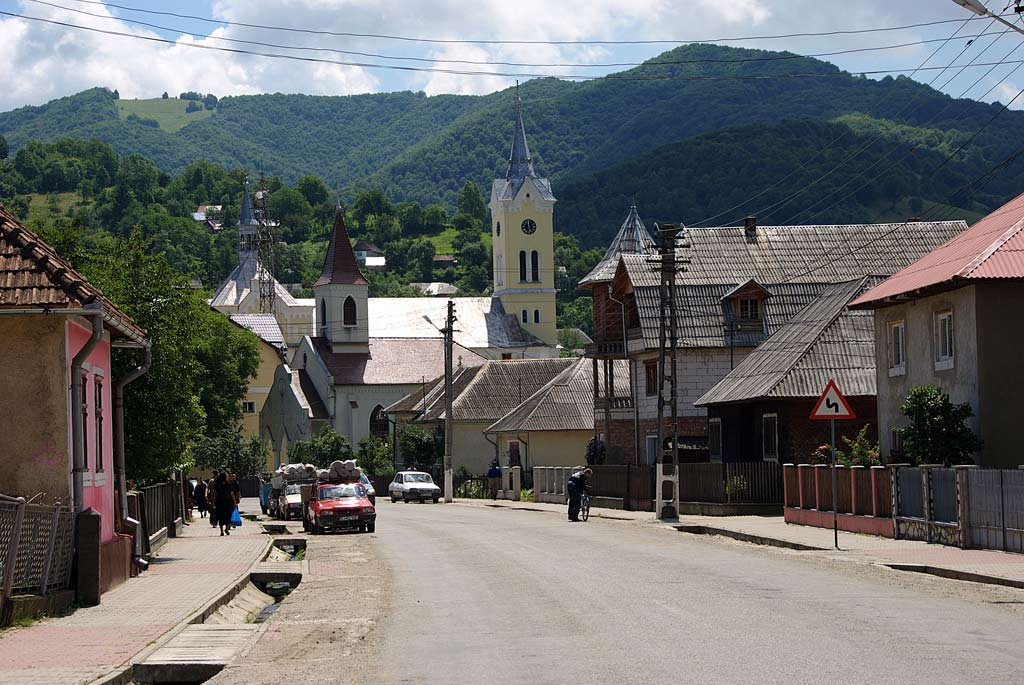
- National Road 17C in Telciu

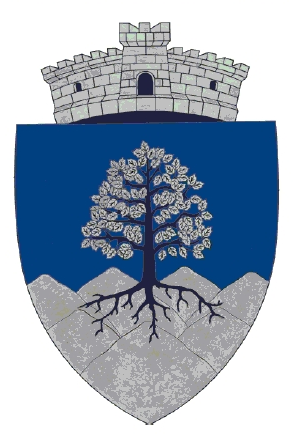
- Coat of arms

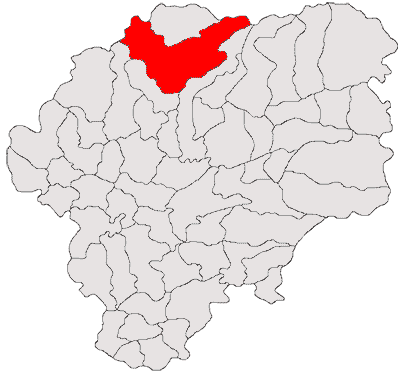
- Location in Bistrița-Năsăud County

- Location in Romania
- Coordinates: 47°26′N 24°24′E
- Country: Romania
- County: Bistrița-Năsăud

Government
  - Mayor (2020–2024): Sever Mureșan (PSD)
- Area: 291.42 km^{2} (112.52 sq mi)
- Elevation: 394 m (1,293 ft)
- Population (2021-12-01): 5,498
  - Density: 18.87/km^{2} (48.86/sq mi)
- Time zone: UTC+02:00 (EET)
  - Summer (DST): UTC+03:00 (EEST)
- Postal code: 427355
- Area code: (+40) 02 63
- Vehicle reg.: BN
- Website: telciu.ro

Telciu (Hungarian: Telcs; German: Teltsch) is a commune in Bistrița-Năsăud County, Transylvania, Romania. It is composed of four villages: Bichigiu (part of Coșbuc until 2004; Bükkös), Fiad (Bánffytelep), Telcișor, and Telciu.

The commune is located in the northern part of the county, 44 km (27 mi) from its capital, Bistrița, on the border with Maramureș County. It is crossed by national road DN17C, which runs straight north from Bistrița to Moisei, close to the Ukrainian border. Train stations in Bichigiu, Telciu, Fiezel, and Fiad serve a Căile Ferate Române rail line.

Telciu lies in a hilly area, at the foot of the Rodna Mountains. The river Sălăuța flows through Telciu; two of its right tributaries, the rivers Fiad and Bichigiu, discharge into the Sălăuța in the eponymous villages. The Tăușoare-Zalion Reserve is located on the administrative territory of the commune. The reserve features the Tăușoare Cave; with a length of 20 km (12 mi) and a depth of 413.5 m (1,357 ft), this is the deepest and the third longest cave in Romania.

At the 2011 census, Telciu had 5,798 inhabitants, of which 95.81% were ethnic Romanians. At the 2021 census, the commune had a population of 5,498, of which 94.51% were ethnic Romanians.

== Natives ==
- Valeria Peter Predescu (1947–2009), folk music singer
- Gelu Vlașin (born 1966), poet and essayist
