= List of books about the Romanian Revolution =

This is a bibliography of works about the Romanian Revolution.

The Romanian Revolution was a series of riots and clashes in December 1989. These were part of the Revolutions of 1989 that occurred in several Warsaw Pact countries. The Romanian Revolution was the only one of these revolutions where a Communist government was violently overthrown and the country's leader was executed.

== In Romanian ==
- ***, Însemnări din zilele revoluției. Decembrie '89, Bucharest, 1990
- ***, România 16-22 decembrie. Sînge, durere, speranță, Bucharest, 1990
- ***, Televiziunea Română, Revoluţia română în direct, Bucharest, 1990
- ***, Timișoara 16-22 decembrie 1989, Timișoara, 1990
- ***, Vom muri și vom fi liberi, Bucharest, 1990
- ***, Revoluția română văzută de ziariști americani și englezi, Bucharest, 1991
- ***, O enigmă care împlinește 7 ani, Bucharest, 1997
- ***, E un început în tot sfîrșitul, Bucharest, 1998
- ***, Atunci ne-am mântuit de frică (photo album), Timișoara, 1999
- ***, Decembrie 89 în presa italiană, Bucharest 1999
- ***, Iași, 14 decembrie 1989, începutul revoluției române?, Oradea, 2000
- ***, Întrebări cu și fără răspuns, Timișoara, 2001
- Vartan Arachelian, Revoluția și personajele sale, Bucharest, 1998
- Georgeta Crăciun, Iași - Revoluție și contrarevoluție, Iași, 2005
- Mihai Babițchi, Revoltă în labirint, Alba Iulia, 1995
- Angela Băcescu, România '89. Din nou în calea năvălirilor barbare, Bucharest, 1995
- Veronica Balaj, Jurnal de Timișoara. 16-22 decembrie 1989, Timișoara, 1991
- Costel Balint,
  - 1989. Timișoara în decembrie, Timișoara, 1992
  - Lumină și speranță. Timișoara 1989, Timișoara, 1994
  - 1989 – Legiunea revoluției, Timișoara, 2005
- Elena Băncilă, Trage, lașule!, Bucharest, 1990
- Matei Barbu, Cap de afiș: Revoluția de la Timișoara, Timișoara, 1999
- Mariana Cernicova, Noi suntem poporul, Timișoara, 2004
- Ruxandra Cesereanu, Decembrie '89. Deconstrucția unei revoluții, Iași, 2004
- Radu Ciobotea, După revoluție, târziu, Timișoara, 1995
- Ion Coman,
  - Timișoara. Zece ani de la sîngerosul decembrie 1989, Bucharest, Sylvi Publishing House, 2000
  - Omul se duce, faptele rămân, istoria însă le va analiza, Bucharest, Meditații Publishing House, 2007
- Pavel Coruț, Să te naști sub steaua noastră!, Bucharest, 1993
- Iosif Costinaș, M-am întors, Timișoara, 2003
- Teodor Crișan, Decembrie '89. Revoluție sau lovitură de palat, Arad, 2000
- Romulus Cristea,
  - Revoluția 1989, Editura România pur și simplu, Bucharest 2006
  - Mărturii de la baricadă, Editura România pur și simplu, Bucharest 2007
- Nicolae Danciu-Petniceanu, Tot ce am pe suflet, Baia Mare, 1995
- Mihail Decean, Mărturiile unui naiv corigibil sau Singur printre securiști, Timișoara, 2006
- Viorel Domenico, Ceaușescu la Târgoviște, 22-25 decembrie 1989, Bucharest, 1999
- Tit Liviu Domșa, Împușcați-i, că nu-s oameni!, Cluj-Napoca, 1998–1999
- Petru Dugulescu, Ei mi-au programat moartea, Timişoara, 2003
- Nicolae Durac, Neliniștea generalilor, Timișoara, 1990
- Victor Frunză, Revoluția împușcată sau PCR după 22 decembrie 1989, Bucharest, 1994
- Ion Iliescu,
  - Revoluție și reformă, Bucharest, 1993; revised edition, 1994
  - Revoluția trăită, Bucharest, 1995
  - Momente de istorie, Bucharest, 1995
- Petru Ilieșu, Timișoara 1989 - No Comment?, Timișoara, Planetarium, 2004
- Institutul Revoluţiei,
  - Caietele revoluției, Bucharest, 1/2005; 2/2005; 1/2006; 2/2006; 3/2006; 4/2006; 5/2006; 1/2007; 2/2007
  - Clio 1989, Bucharest 2005
- Cicerone Ionițoiu, Album al eroilor decembrie 1989, Sibiu, 1998
- Sabin Ivan, Pe urmele adevărului, Constanţa, 1996
- Eugenia Laszlo, Timişoara, atunci, Timișoara, 1998
- Dorian Marcu, Moartea Ceaușeștilor, Bucharest, 1991
- Dumitru Mazilu, Revoluția furată, Bucharest, 1991
- Florin Medeleţ, O cronică a revoluţiei din Timișoara 16-22 decembrie 1989, Timișoara, 1990
- Miodrag Milin,
  - Timișoara 15-21 decembrie '89, Timișoara, 1990 part 1, part 2, part 3, part 4
  - Timișoara în revoluţie și după, Timişoara, 1997
  - Timișoara în arhivele Europei Libere, Bucharest, 1999
- Marius Mioc,
  - Falsificatorii istoriei, Timișoara 1994; second revised edition, 1995
  - Revoluția din Timișoara aşa cum a fost, Timișoara, 1997
  - Revoluția din Timișoara și falsificatorii istoriei, Timişoara, 1999
  - Revoluția, fără mistere. Începutul revoluției române: cazul Laszlo Tokes, Timișoara, 2002
  - Curtea Supremă de Justiție - Procesele revoluției din Timișoara (1989), Timișoara, 2004
  - Revoluția din 1989 și minciunile din Jurnalul Național, Timișoara, 2005
  - Revoluția din 1989 pe scurt, Timișoara, 2006
- Bogdan Murgescu (coordinator), Revoluția română din 1989. Istorie și memorie, Polirom, Iași, 2007
- Costel Neacșu, Religiozitatea revoluției române din decembrie 1989, Alba Iulia, 2007
- Sergiu Nicolaescu,
  - Revoluția. Începutul adevărului, Bucharest, 1995
  - Cartea revoluţiei române decembrie '89, Bucharest, 1999
- Aurel Perva, Carol Roman,
  - Misterele revoluției române, Bucharest, 1990
  - Misterele revoluției române - revenire după ani, Bucharest, 1998
- Ion Pitulescu,
  - Șase zile care au zguduit România, Bucharest, 1995
  - Anul nou se naște în sânge!, Bucharest, 1998
- Vasile Popa, Procesul de la Timișoara, Timişoara, 1990
- Rodica Popescu, Miracol? Revoluție? Lovitură de stat?, Bucharest, 1990
- Radu Portocală, România. Autopsia unei lovituri de stat, Bucharest, 1991
- Dumitru Preda, 1989. Principiul dominoului, Bucharest, 2000
- Antonina Radoș, Complotul securității. Revoluția trădată din România, Bucharest, 1999
- Valentin Raiha, KGB a aruncat în aer România cu complicitatea unui grup de militari, Bucharest, 1995
- Nestor Rateș, România: Revoluția încâlcită, Bucharest, 1995
- Șerban Săndulescu, Decembrie '89. Lovitura de stat a confiscat revoluție română, Bucharest, 1996
- Alexandru Saucă, KGB-ul și revoluția română, Bucharest, 1994
- Constantin Sava, Constantin Monac,
  - Adevăr despre decembrie 1989, Bucharest, 1999
  - Revoluția română din decembrie 1989 retrăită prin documente și mărturii, Bucharest, 2001
- Ioan Scurtu,
  - Sfîrșitul dictaturii, Bucharest, 1990
  - Revoluția din decembrie 1989 în context internațional, Bucharest, 2006
- Cassian Maria Spiridon, Iași 14 decembrie 1989, începutul revoluției române, Iași, 1994
- Alex Mihai Stoenescu,
  - Interviuri despre revoluție, Bucharest, 2004
  - Istoria loviturilor de stat din România, vol. 4 (I): "Revoluția din decembrie 1989 - o tragedie românească", Bucharest, 2004
  - Istoria loviturilor de stat din România, vol. 4 (II): "Revoluția din decembrie 1989 - o tragedie românească", Bucharest, 2005
- Ilie Stoian, Decembrie '89 "criminala capodoperă", Bucharest, 1998
- Nicolae Stroescu, Pe urmele revoluției, Bucharest, 1992
- Titus Suciu,
  - Reportaj cu sufletul la gură, Timișoara, 1990
  - Lumea bună a balconului, Timișoara, 1995
- Ion Țârlea, Moartea pândește sub epoleți. Sibiu '89, Bucharest, 1993
- Filip Teodorescu, Un risc asumat, Bucharest, 1992
- Radu Tinu, Timișoara... no comment!, Bucharest, 1999
- László Tőkés, Asediul Timișoarei, Oradea, 1999
- Tiberiu Urdăreanu, 1989 - martor și participant, Bucharest, 1996

== In French ==
- Radu Portocală, Autopsie du coup d'État roumain, Calmann-Lévy, Paris, 1990 ISBN 2-7021-1935-2

== In English ==
- Sorin Antohi, Vladimir Tismăneanu, Between Past and Future: The Revolutions of 1989 and Their Aftermath, Central European University Press, Budapest, 2000
- Ivo Banac (ed.), Eastern Europe in Revolution: Katherine Verdery, Gail Klingman, "Romania After Ceausescu: Post-communist Communism", Cornell University Press, Ithaca, 1992 ISBN 0-8014-9997-6
- Andrei Codrescu, The Hole in the Flag: A Romanian Exile's Story of Return and Revolution, William Morrow and Co., New York City, 1991 ISBN 0-688-08805-8
- Marius Mioc, The Anticommunist Romanian Revolution of 1989, Editura Marineasa, Timişoara, 2002; second edition 2004
- Steven D. Roper, Romania: The Unfinished Revolution, Routledge, London, 2000 ISBN 90-5823-027-9
- Peter Siani-Davies, The Romanian Revolution of December 1989, Cornell University Press, Ithaca, 2005 ISBN 0-8014-4245-1
- George Galloway and Bob Wylie, Downfall: The Ceausescus and the Romanian Revolution, Futura Publications, 1991 ISBN 0-7088-5003-0
- Petru Ilieşu, Timişoara 1989 - No Comment?, Timişoara, Planetarium, 2004
- Mark Almond. The Rise and Fall of Nicolae and Elena Ceausescu. KRK: Orion, 1991.
- Nestor Ratesh. Romania: The Entangled Revolution (The Washington Papers). Westport, Connecticut: Praeger Paperback, 1991.
- Lazlo Tokes. With God for the People: The Autobiography of ... As Told to David Porter (Teach Yourself). Port Jervis: Lubrecht & Cramer Ltd, 1990.
- Bel Mooney. "Voices of Silence, the". Bantam Doubleday Dell Books for Young Readers, 1997. ISBN 0-440-22758-5
- Lehel Vandor. "Ears", LegendPress & YouWriteOn, 2008 (first edition), 2014 (revised updated edition), ISBN 1502723417, ISBN 978-1502723413

== In German ==
- Anneli Ute Gabanyi, Die unvollendete Revolution: Rumänien zwischen Diktatur und Demokratie, Piper Verlag, Munich, 1990 ISBN 3-492-11271-4

== In Hungarian ==
- József Gazda, Megváltó karácsony, Budapest, 1990
- László Tőkés,
  - Temesvár ostroma '89, Budapest, 1990
  - Temesvári memento, Oradea, 1999

== Multilingual ==
- István Tolnay, 1989-1999. După zece ani. Tíz év múltán. Ten years after, Oradea, 1999 (Romanian-Hungarian-English)

== See also ==
- List of films about the Romanian Revolution of 1989
