= Florin Filipoiu =

Romanian physician and academic

- Born: 15 January 1958 (age 68)
- Citizenship: Romania
- Education: Carol Davila University
- Known for: Romanian Revolution
- Scientific career
- Fields: medicine (radiology), anatomy
- Institutions: Carol Davila University
- Thesis: Contribuții la studiul morfologiei plexurilor vegetative din peretele tubului digestiv (Contributions to the study of the morphology of the vegetative plexuses in the wall of the digestive tube) (2000)

Florin Mihail Filipoiu (born 15 January 1958) is a Romanian physician and academic, known for his role in the Romanian Revolution.

== Early life and career ==
Filipoiu was born on 15 January 1958. He graduated from the Faculty of Medicine at the Carol Davila University in 1984, specializing in radiology.

Filipoiu received his doctorate in 2000 and, since 2013, he is a full professor at the Faculty of Medicine of the Carol Davila University, as well as the head of the Anatomy Department of the Faculty. He is also the prodean of the Faculty.

== Role in the Romanian Revolution ==
On the morning of 21 December 1989, Florin Filipoiu was driving his car on the road from Târgoviște, where he worked at the Municipal Hospital, to Bucharest, where he was a trainer at the Department of Anatomy of the Faculty of Medicine, he listened to the radio speech of Nicolae Ceaușescu. He arrived in Bucharest at noon and stopped at the Roman Square, where the first group of anti-Ceausescu demonstrators formed. There were about 15 students and one worker from the 23 August Factory. Filipoiu joined them. When the night came, the communist regime's law enforcement began firing weapons at protesters. The protesters managed to barricade themselves in front of the InterContinental Hotel, from which they had to flee. Many were shot, clubbed to death, stabbed and crushed by armoured vehicles, but Filipoiu survived, and managed to escape to his apartment. Arriving home, he took the phone book and started calling people from all counties to tell them that the revolution had begun.

On 22 December, after the revolutionaries took control of TVR, Filipoiu gave a speech in which he called for, among other things, the abolition of the cult of personality, the release of political prisoners, free elections and free press.

In an interview for Adevarul in 2010, Filipoiu said that Ion Iliescu and the National Salvation Front "confiscated" the revolution to take power.

== Controversies ==
In July 2017, several professors at the Carol Davila University were accused of bribery. He was acquitted in August the same year. While Filipoiu was investigated, journalist Dorin Chioțea, who is a physician by training and who was also Filipoiu's student, published an article defending Filipoiu.
