= Romanian revolution =

1989 popular uprising in Romania

- Part of the Revolutions of 1989
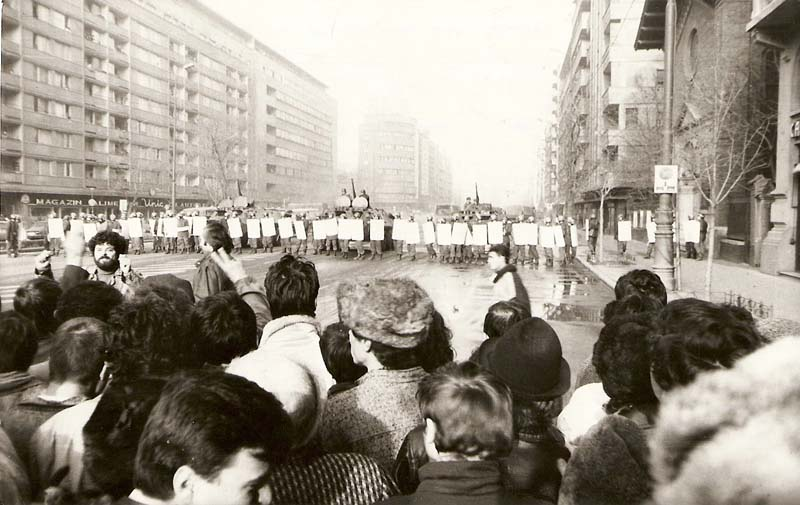
- APCs and Miliția on the Magheru Boulevard in Bucharest during the 1989 Revolution
Date	16–25 December 1989 (violence continued until 30 December 1989)
Location	Romania
Result	Revolutionary victory Trial and execution of Nicolae and Elena Ceaușescu

Belligerents
Until 22 December 1989: Government; Securitate; Miliția; Army of the Socialist Republic of Romania; Communist Party loyalists	Until 22 December 1989: Revolutionaries; Anti-communists; Romanian Democratic Front; Communist Party dissidents
After 22 December 1989: (Socialist Republic of Romania) Ceaușescu loyalists	After 22 December 1989: Government; National Salvation Front; Romanian Armed Forces

Commanders and leaders
(Romania) Nicolae Ceaușescu (executed) (Romania) Elena Ceaușescu (executed) Constantin Dăscălescu Emil Bobu Victor Stănculescu Vasile Milea ‡‡	(Socialist Republic of Romania) Lorin Fortuna; Protesters (no centralised leadership) (Socialist Republic of Romania) Ion Iliescu, members of the National Salvation Front Council; Victor Stănculescu

Casualties and losses
- 689–1,290 killed 3,321 injured

The Romanian revolution (Romanian: Revoluția română) was a period of violent civil unrest in the Socialist Republic of Romania during December 1989 as a part of the revolutions of 1989 that occurred in several countries around the world, primarily within the Eastern Bloc. The Romanian revolution started in the city of Timișoara and soon spread throughout the country, ultimately culminating in the drumhead trial and execution of longtime Romanian Communist Party (PCR) General Secretary Nicolae Ceaușescu and his wife Elena, and the end of 42 years of Communist rule in Romania. It was also the last removal of a Marxist–Leninist government in a Warsaw Pact country during the events of 1989, and the only one that violently overthrew a country's leadership and executed its leader; according to estimates, over one thousand people died and thousands more were injured.

Following World War II, Romania found itself inside the Soviet sphere of influence, with Communist rule officially declared in 1947. In April 1964, when Romania published a general policy paper worked out under Gheorghe Gheorghiu-Dej's instructions, the country was well on its way of carefully breaking away from Soviet control. Nicolae Ceaușescu became the country's leader the following year. Under his rule, Romania experienced a brief waning of internal repression that led to a positive image both at home and in the West. However, repression again intensified by the 1970s, and Ceaușescu's regime eventually became one of the most repressive in the world and one of the most repressive of modern times. Social and economic malaise had been present in the Socialist Republic of Romania for quite some time, especially during the austerity years of the 1980s. The austerity measures were designed in part by Ceaușescu to repay the country's foreign debts, but resulted in widespread shortages that fomented unrest. Amid tensions in the late 1980s, early protests occurred in the city of Timișoara in mid-December on the part of the Hungarian minority in response to an attempt by the government to evict Hungarian Reformed Church pastor László Tőkés. In response, Romanians sought the deposition of Ceaușescu and a change in government in light of similar recent events in neighbouring nations. The country's ubiquitous secret police force, the Securitate, which was both one of the largest in the Eastern Bloc and for decades had been the main suppressor of popular dissent, frequently and violently quashing political disagreement, ultimately proved incapable of stopping the looming, and then highly fatal and successful revolt.

Shortly after a botched public speech by Ceaușescu on 21 December from a balcony of the Party headquarters in the capital Bucharest that was broadcast to millions of Romanians on state television, Defence Minister Vasile Milea's death and acting Defence Minister Victor Stănculescu's secret defection, rank-and-file members of the military switched, after being told to stay in barracks, from supporting the dictator to backing the protesters. With the army unmobilised and the headquarters thus unprotected, on 22 December protesters stormed the building and Victor Stănculescu convinced the Romanian leader to flee with his wife via helicopter. Denounced afterward by Stănculescu, they suddenly found themselves as fugitives and thus seemingly guilty of accused crimes, and a manhunt was declared. Captured in Târgoviște, they were tried by a drumhead military tribunal on charges of genocide, damage to the national economy, and abuse of power to execute military actions against the Romanian people. They were convicted on all charges, sentenced to death, and immediately executed on Christmas Day 1989. They were the last people to be condemned to death and executed in Romania, as capital punishment was abolished soon after. For several days after Ceaușescu fled, many would be killed in the crossfire between civilians and armed forces personnel which believed the other to be Securitate 'terrorists'. Although news reports at the time and modern media often makes reference to the Securitate fighting against the revolution, there has never been any evidence supporting the claim of an organised effort. Hospitals in Bucharest were treating as many as thousands of civilians. Following an ultimatum, many Securitate members turned themselves in on 29 December with the assurance they would not be tried.

Present-day Romania has unfolded in the shadow of the Ceaușescus along with its Communist past, and its tumultuous departure from it. After Ceaușescu was summarily executed, the National Salvation Front (FSN) quickly took power, promising free and fair elections within five months. Elected in a landslide the following May, the FSN reconstituted as a political party, installed a series of economic and democratic reforms, with further social policy changes being implemented by later governments. From that point on, Romania has become far more integrated with the West. Romania became a member of NATO and the European Union in 2004 and 2007, respectively.

== Background ==
Romanian dictator Nicolae Ceaușescu in 1988

In 1981, Ceaușescu began an austerity programme designed to enable Romania to liquidate its entire national debt (US$10,000,000,000). To achieve this, many basic goods—including gas, heating and food—were rationed, which reduced the standard of living and increased malnutrition. The infant mortality rate grew to be the highest in Europe.

The secret police, the Securitate, had become so omnipresent that it made Romania a police state. Free speech was limited and opinions that did not favor the Romanian Communist Party (PCR) were forbidden. The large numbers of Securitate informers made organised dissent nearly impossible. The regime deliberately played on this sense that everyone was being watched to make it easier to bend the people to the Party's will. Even by Soviet Bloc standards, the Securitate was exceptionally brutal.

Ceaușescu created a cult of personality, with weekly shows in stadiums or on streets in different cities dedicated to him, his wife and the Communist Party. There were several megalomaniac projects, such as the construction of the grandiose House of the Republic (today the Palace of the Parliament)—the biggest palace in the world—the adjacent Centrul Civic and a never-completed museum dedicated to Communism and Ceaușescu, today the Casa Radio. These and similar projects drained the country's finances and aggravated the already dire economic situation. Thousands of Bucharest residents were evicted from their homes, which were subsequently demolished to make room for the huge structures.

Unlike the other Warsaw Pact leaders, Ceaușescu had not been slavishly pro-Soviet but rather had pursued an "independent" foreign policy; Romanian forces did not join their Warsaw Pact allies in putting an end to the Prague Spring—an invasion Ceaușescu openly denounced—while Romanian athletes competed at the Soviet-boycotted 1984 Summer Olympics in Los Angeles (receiving a standing ovation at the opening ceremonies and proceeding to win 53 medals, trailing only the United States and West Germany in the overall count). Conversely, while Soviet Communist Party General Secretary Mikhail Gorbachev spoke of reform, Ceaușescu maintained a hard political line and cult of personality.

The austerity programme started in 1981 and the widespread poverty it introduced made the Communist regime very unpopular. The austerity programmes were met with little resistance among Romanians and there were only a few strikes and labour disputes, of which the Jiu Valley miners' strike of 1977 and the Brașov Rebellion of November 1987 at the truck manufacturer Steagul Roșu were the most notable. In March 1989, several leading activists of the PCR criticised Ceaușescu's economic policies in a letter, but shortly thereafter he achieved a significant political victory: Romania paid off its external debt of about US$11,000,000,000 several months before the time that even the Romanian dictator expected. However, in the months following the austerity programme, shortages of goods remained the same as before.

Like the East German state newspaper, official Romanian news organs made no mention of the fall of the Berlin Wall in the first days following 9 November 1989. The most notable news in Romanian newspapers of 11 November 1989, was the "masterly lecture by comrade Nicolae Ceaușescu at the extended plenary session of the Central Committee of the Communist Party of Romania," in which the Romanian head of state and party highly praised the "brilliant programme for the work and revolutionary struggle of all our people," as well as the "exemplary fulfillment of economic tasks." What had happened 1,500 km (930 mi) northwest of Bucharest, in divided Berlin, during those days is not even mentioned. Socialism is praised as the "way of the free, independent development of the peoples." The same day, on Bucharest's Brezoianu Street and Kogălniceanu Boulevard, a group of students from Cluj-Napoca attempted a demonstration but were quickly apprehended. It initially appeared that Ceaușescu would weather the wave of revolution sweeping across Eastern Europe, as he was formally re-elected for another five-year term as General Secretary of the Romanian Communist Party on 24 November at the party's XIV Congress. On that same day, Ceaușescu's counterpart in Czechoslovakia, Miloš Jakeš, resigned along with the entire Communist leadership, effectively ending Communist rule in Czechoslovakia.

The three students, Mihnea Paraschivescu, Grațian Vulpe, and the economist Dan Căprariu-Schlachter from Cluj, were detained and investigated by the Securitate at the Rahova Penitentiary on suspicion of propaganda against the socialist society. They were released on 22 December 1989 at 14:00. There were other letters and attempts to draw attention to the economic, cultural, and spiritual oppression of Romanians, but they served only to intensify the activity of the police and Securitate.

=== Mounting isolation within the Warsaw Pact ===
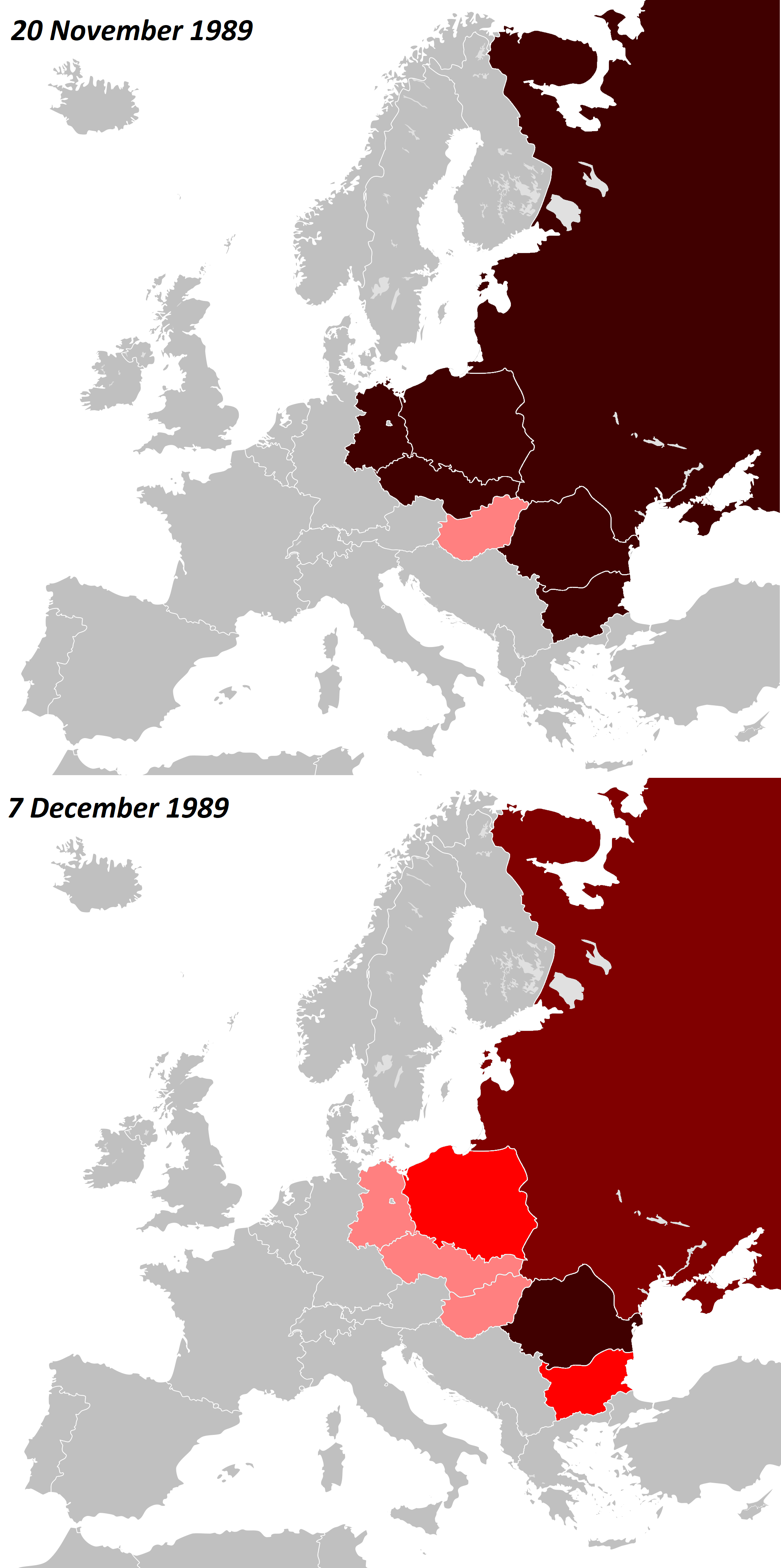
The disintegration of Warsaw Pact Communist regimes before the Romanian revolution. Countries in pink removed the leading role of the Communist Party from their constitutions. Countries in light red disbanded their party militias. The Soviet Union (in dark red) had one republic which removed the leading role of the Communist Party from its constitution. Countries in darkest red had fully-functioning Communist regimes.

On 20 November 1989 (the day when Ceaușescu was reelected as leader of the Romanian Communist Party) almost all of the Warsaw Pact Communist regimes were institutionally intact. The leading role of the Communist Party was enshrined in their constitutions and the party militia was active. The lone exception was Hungary, where, in October 1989, the leading role of the party was rescinded from the constitution and the party militia was abolished. However, very soon after Ceaușescu's reelection, the other communist regimes in the Warsaw Pact began to crumble as well. The party militia was abolished in Poland on 23 November and then in Bulgaria on 25 November. The leading role of the party was rescinded from the constitution of Czechoslovakia on 29 November and from that of East Germany on 1 December. Even the Soviet Union's Communist regime had started to unravel while Ceaușescu was still in power: on 7 December 1989, one of its 15 Union Republics, Lithuania, removed the leading role of the Communist Party from its constitution.

== Timișoara uprising ==
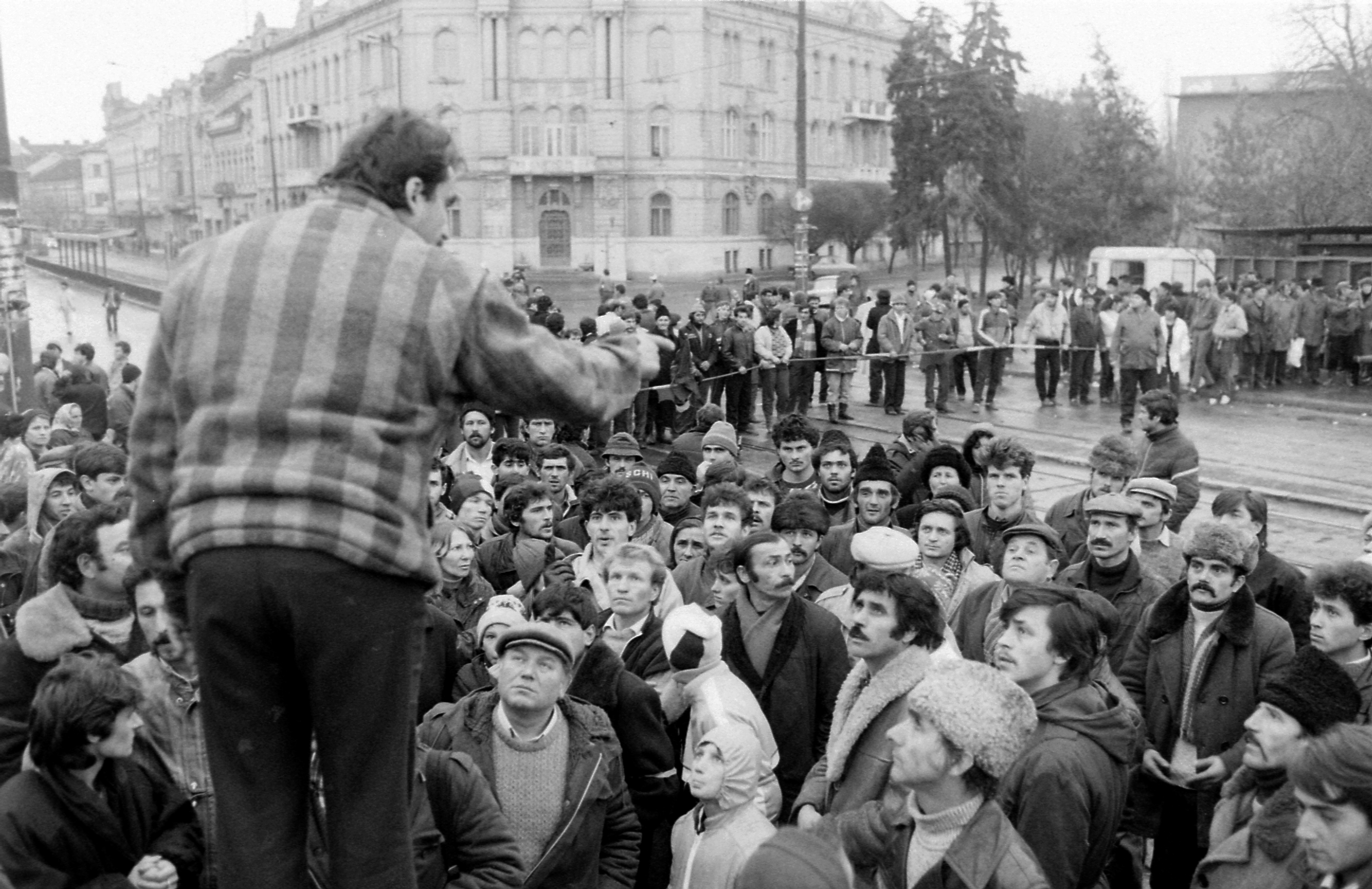
Demonstration in Timișoara

On 16 December 1989, the Hungarian minority in Timișoara held a public protest in response to an attempt by the government to evict Hungarian Reformed church Pastor László Tőkés. In July of that year, in an interview with Hungarian television, Tőkés had criticised the regime's systematisation policy and complained that Romanians did not even know their human rights. As Tőkés described it later, the interview, which had been seen in the border areas and was then spread all over Romania, had "a shock effect upon the Romanians, the Securitate as well, on the people of Romania. [...] [I]t had an unexpected effect upon the public atmosphere in Romania."

At the behest of the government, his bishop removed him from his post, thereby depriving him of the right to use the apartment to which he was entitled as a pastor, and assigned him to be a pastor in the countryside. For some time his parishioners gathered around his home to protect him from harassment and eviction. Many passersby spontaneously joined in. As it became clear that the crowd would not disperse, the mayor, Petre Moț, made remarks suggesting that he had overturned the decision to evict Tőkés. Meanwhile, the crowd had grown impatient and, when Moț declined to confirm his statement against the planned eviction in writing, the crowd started to chant anti-communist slogans. Subsequently, police and Securitate forces showed up at the scene. By 19:30 the protest had spread and the original cause became largely irrelevant.

Some of the protesters attempted to burn down the building that housed the district committee of the PCR. The Securitate responded with tear gas and water cannons, while police beat up rioters and arrested many of them. Around 21:00 the rioters withdrew. They regrouped eventually around the Timișoara Orthodox Cathedral and started a protest march around the city, but again they were confronted by the security forces.

=== Crackdown ===
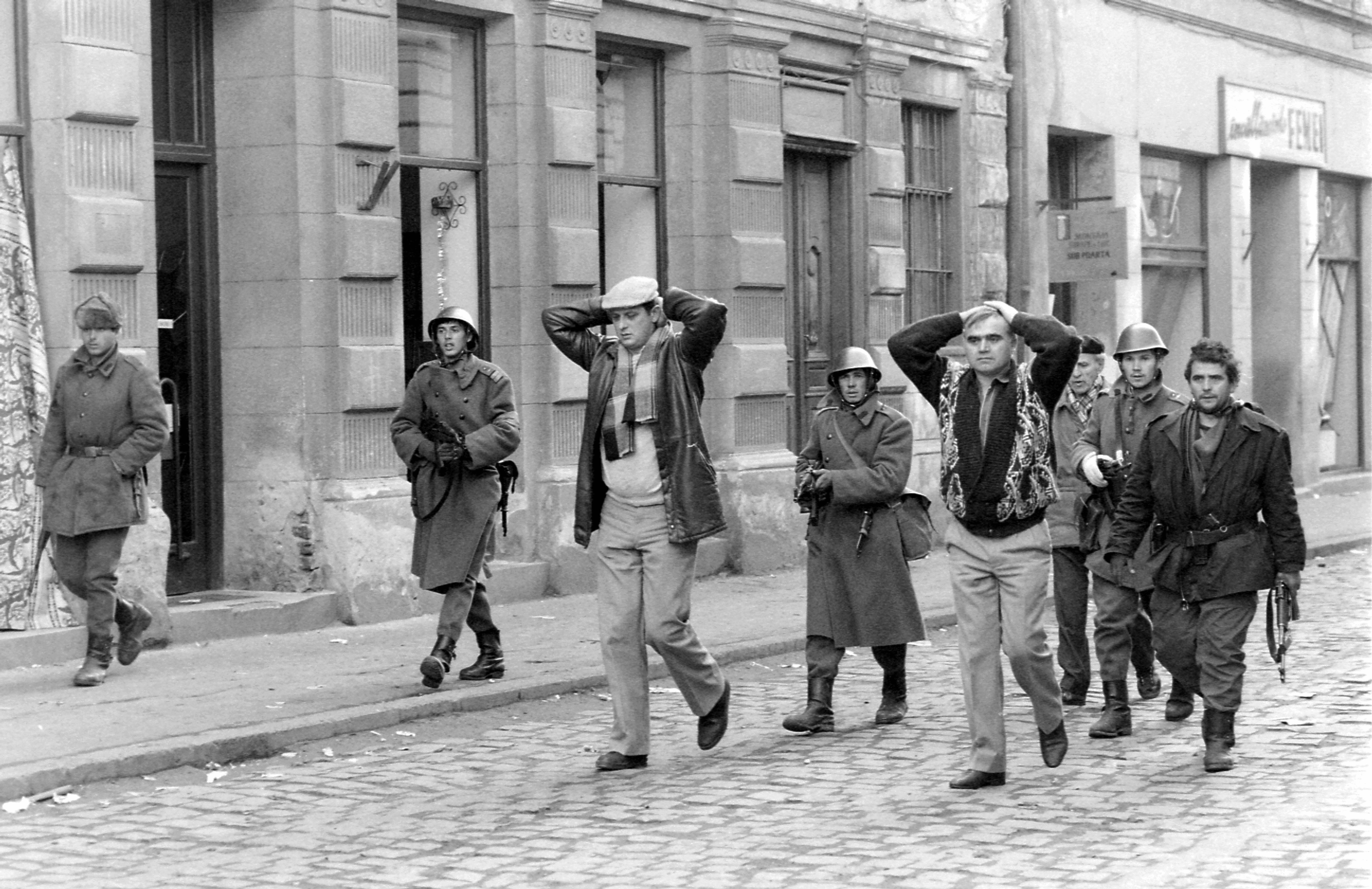
People detained after 22 December 1989 in Timișoara

Riots and protests resumed the following day, 17 December. The rioters broke into the district committee building and threw party documents, propaganda brochures, Ceaușescu's writings, and other symbols of Communist power out of windows.

The military was sent in to control the riots, because the situation was beyond the capability of the Securitate and conventional police to handle. The presence of the army in the streets was an ominous sign; it meant that they had received their orders from the highest level of the command chain, presumably from Ceaușescu himself. The army failed to establish order, and chaos ensued, including gunfire, fights, casualties, and burned cars. Transportor Amfibiu Blindat (TAB) armoured personnel carriers and tanks were called in.

After 20:00, from Piața Libertății (Liberty Square) to the Opera, there was wild shooting, including the area of Decebal bridge, Calea Lipovei (Lipovei Avenue) and Calea Girocului (Girocului Avenue). Tanks, trucks and TABs blocked the accesses into the city, while helicopters hovered overhead. After midnight, the protests calmed down. Colonel-General Ion Coman, local Party secretary Ilie Matei, and Colonel-General Ștefan Gușă (Chief of the Romanian General Staff) inspected the city. Some areas looked like the aftermath of a war: destruction, rubble and blood.

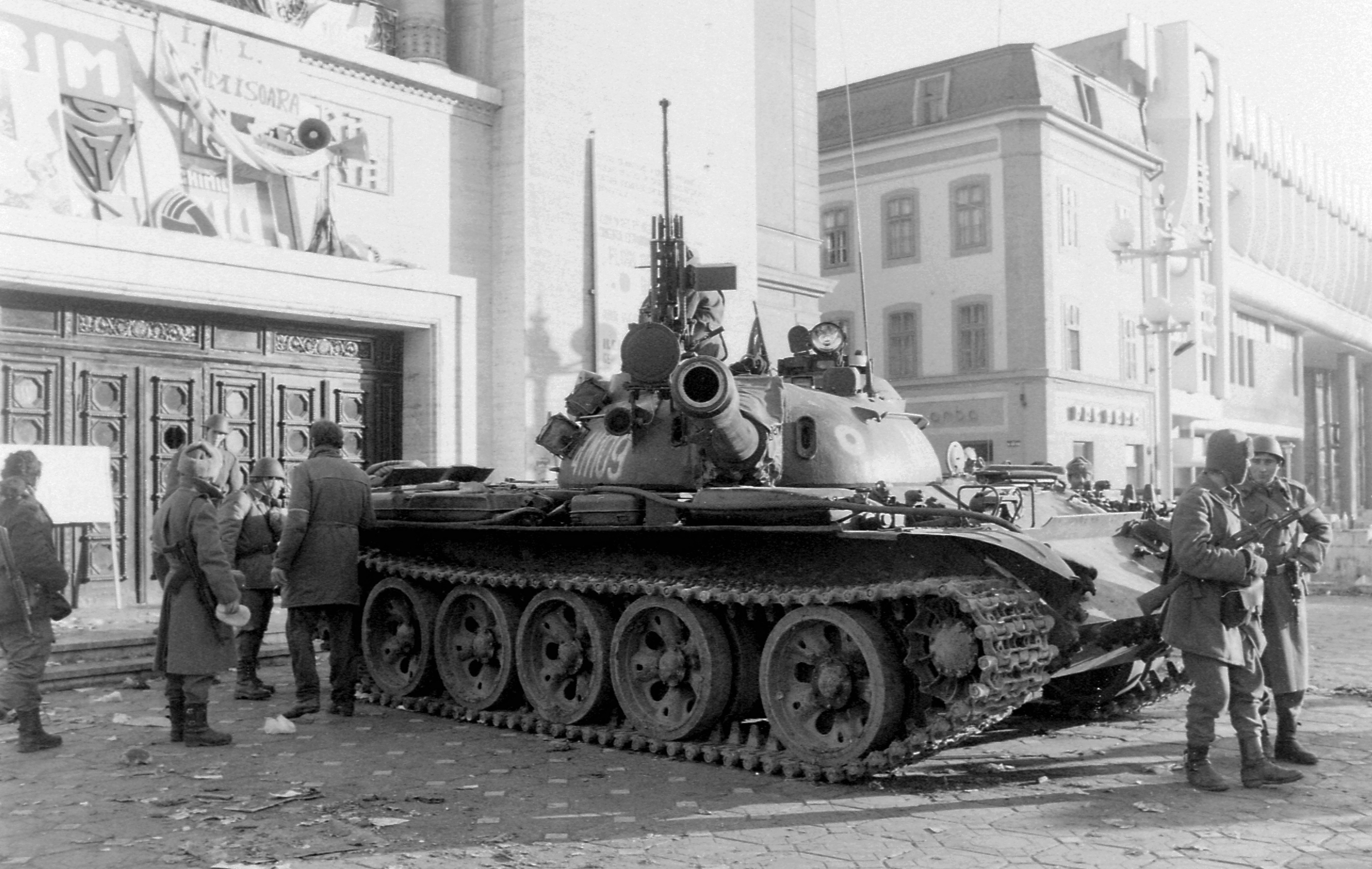
T-55 tank in front of the Timișoara Opera House

On the morning of 18 December, the centre was being guarded by soldiers and Securitate agents in plainclothes. Ceaușescu departed for a visit to Iran, leaving the duty of crushing the Timișoara revolt to his subordinates and his wife. Mayor Moț ordered a party gathering to take place at the university, with the purpose of condemning the "vandalism" of the previous days. He also declared martial law, prohibiting people from going about in groups of larger than two.

Defying the curfew, a group of 30 young men headed for the Orthodox cathedral, where they stopped and waved a Romanian flag from which they had removed the Romanian communist coat of arms, leaving a distinctive hole, in a manner similar to the Hungarian Revolution of 1956. Expecting that they would be fired upon, they started to sing "Deșteaptă-te, române!" ("Awaken thee, Romanian!"), an earlier patriotic song that had been banned in 1947 (but then partially co-opted by the Ceaușescu regime once he fashioned himself as a nationalist). Ethnic Hungarian protesters also chanted "Români, veniți cu noi!" ("Romanians, come with us", to convey that the protest was by and for all citizens of Romania, not an ethnic minority matter). They were, indeed, fired upon; some died and others were seriously injured, while the lucky ones were able to escape.

On 19 December, local Party functionary Radu Bălan and Colonel-General Ștefan Gușă visited workers in the city's factories, but failed to get them to resume work. On 20 December, massive columns of workers entered the city. About 100,000 protesters occupied Piața Operei (Opera Square – today Piața Victoriei, Victory Square) and chanted anti-government slogans: "Noi suntem poporul!" ("We are the people!"), "Armata e cu noi!" ("The army is on our side!"), "Nu vă fie frică, Ceaușescu pică!" ("Have no fear, Ceaușescu is falling!")

Meanwhile, Secretary to the Central Committee Emil Bobu and Prime Minister Constantin Dăscălescu were sent by Elena Ceaușescu (Nicolae being at that time in Iran) to resolve the situation. They met with a delegation of the protesters and agreed to free the majority of the arrested protesters. However, they refused to comply with the protesters' main demand— the resignation of Ceaușescu—and the situation remained essentially unchanged.

The next day, trains loaded with workers from factories in Oltenia arrived in Timișoara. The regime was attempting to use them to repress the mass protests, but after a brief encounter they ended up joining the protests. One worker explained, "Yesterday our factory boss and a party official rounded us up in the yard, handed us wooden clubs and told us that Hungarians and 'hooligans' were devastating Timișoara and that it is our duty to go there and help crush the riots. But I realised that wasn't the truth."

Upon Ceaușescu's return from Iran on the evening of 20 December, the situation became even more tense, and he gave a televised speech from the TV studio inside the Central Committee Building (CC Building) in which he spoke about the events at Timișoara in terms of an "interference of foreign forces in Romania's internal affairs" and an "external aggression on Romania's sovereignty."

The country, which had no information about the Timișoara events from the national media, heard about the Timișoara revolt from Western radio stations like Voice of America and Radio Free Europe, and by word of mouth. A mass meeting was staged for the next day, 21 December, which, according to the official media, was presented as a "spontaneous movement of support for Ceaușescu," emulating the 1968 meeting in which Ceaușescu had spoken against the invasion of Czechoslovakia by Warsaw Pact forces.

== Revolution spreads ==
=== Ceaușescu's speech ===
On the morning of 21 December, Ceaușescu addressed an assembly of approximately 100,000 people to condemn the uprising in Timișoara. Party officials took great pains to make it appear that Ceaușescu was still immensely popular. Several busloads of workers, under threat of being fired, arrived in Bucharest's Piața Palatului (Palace Square, now Piața Revoluției – Revolution Square) and were given red flags, banners and large pictures of Ceaușescu. They were augmented by bystanders who were rounded up on Calea Victoriei.

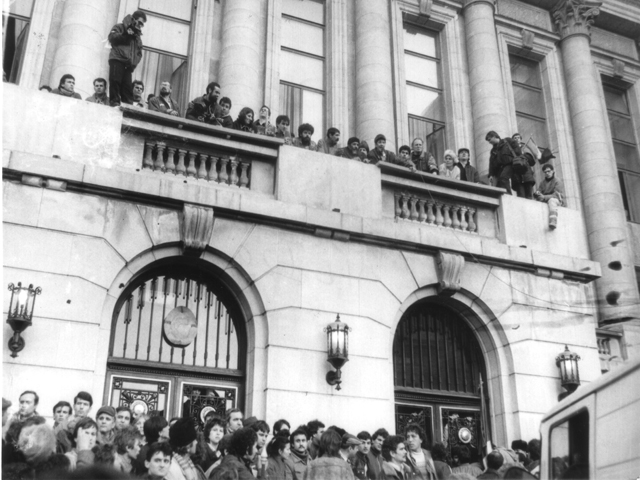
The balcony where Ceaușescu delivered his last speech, taken over by the crowd during the Romanian revolution of 1989

After a short introduction from Barbu Petrescu, the mayor of Bucharest and organiser of the rally, Ceaușescu began to speak from the balcony of the Central Committee building, greeting the crowd and thanking the organisers of the rally and the residents of Bucharest. Just over a minute into the speech, a high-pitched scream was heard in the distance. Within seconds, this developed into widespread shouting and screaming, as Ceaușescu looked on while speaking. A few seconds later, he ceased speaking completely, raised his right hand and stared silently at the unfolding chaos. The TV image then shook noticeably and video interference appeared on screen. At that point, Florian Rat, Ceaușescu's bodyguard, appeared and advised Ceaușescu to go inside the building. Censors then cut the live TV feed, but it was too late. The disturbance had already been broadcast, and viewers realised that something highly unusual was occurring.

Contrary to many reports, Ceaușescu was not at this point hustled inside the building. Instead, undeterred, he and his wife, Elena, along with other officials, spent almost three minutes trying to understand what was happening and haranguing the confused crowd, some of whom appeared to be trying to leave the area, while others moved towards the Central Committee building. Elena wondered aloud whether there was an earthquake in progress. Ceaușescu repeatedly tapped the microphone, trying to call the attention of the crowd. After the tumult died down to some extent, live TV service resumed as Ceaușescu announced that a decision had been taken that morning to raise several allowances, including the minimum wage, from 2,000 to 2,200 lei per month (an increase of 13 U.S. dollars at the time), and the old age pension from 800 to 900 lei per month. Ceaușescu continued his speech, addressing the events of Timișoara and blaming them on imperialist circles and intelligence services that wished to destroy the integrity and sovereignty of Romania and halt the construction of socialism. He continued in this nationalist and Marxist–Leninist vein, referencing his speech of 21 August 1968, where he had asserted Romania's independence within the Warsaw Pact at the time of the invasion of Czechoslovakia, and promising to continue to defend socialist Romania as before. In all, following the interruption, the speech and the associated exhortations continued for over 13 minutes, and ended with Ceaușescu waving to the crowd.

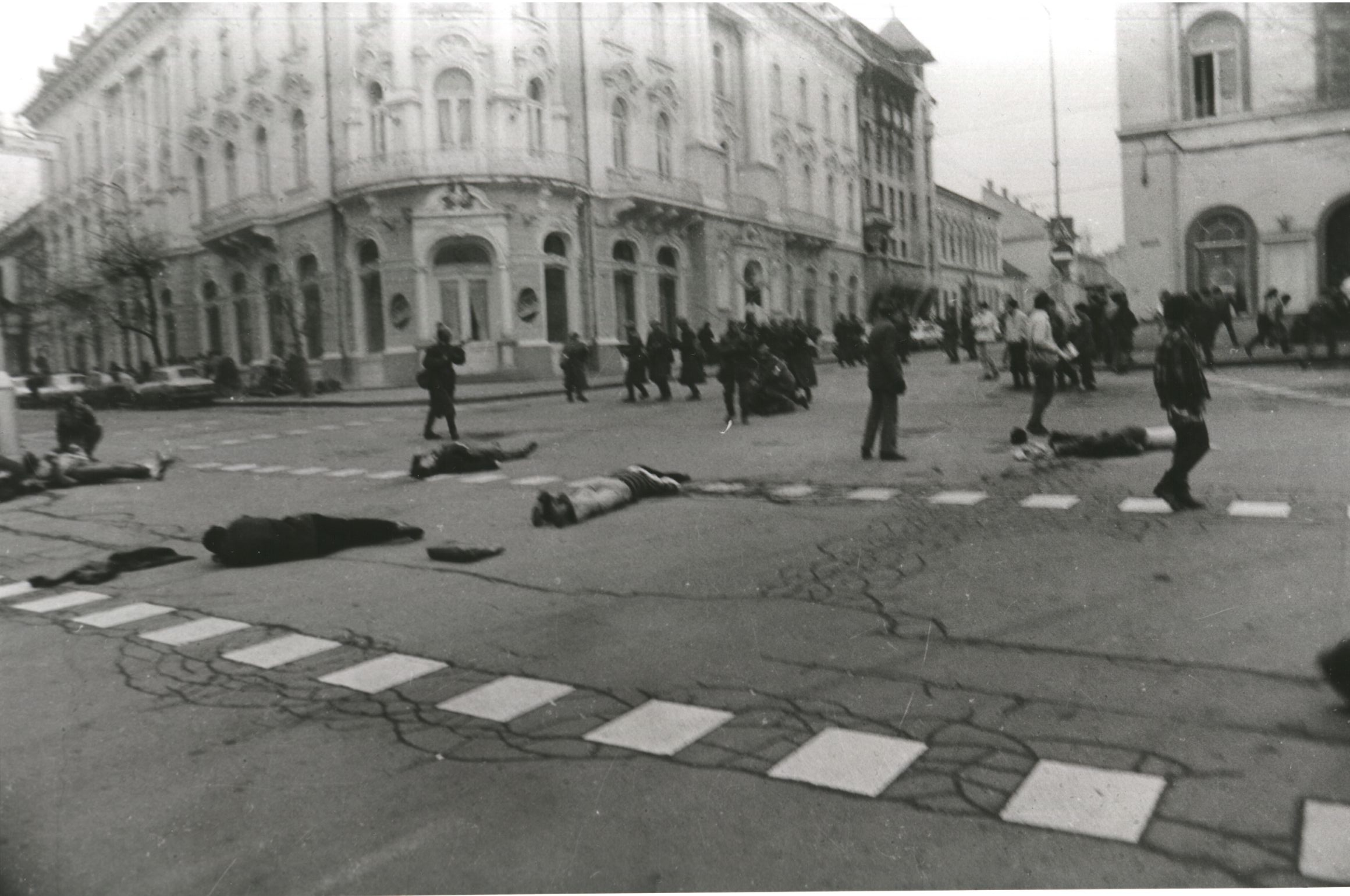
Protesters in Cluj-Napoca on the morning of 21 December. This photo was taken by Răzvan Rotta after army forces opened fire.

The protest demonstration soon erupted into a riot; the crowd took to the streets, placing the capital, like Timișoara, in turmoil. Members of the crowd spontaneously began shouting anti-Ceaușescu slogans, which spread and became chants: "Jos dictatorul!" ("Down with the dictator"), "Moarte criminalului!" ("Death to the criminal"), "Noi suntem poporul, jos cu dictatorul!" ("We are the people, down with the dictator"), "Ceaușescu cine ești?/Criminal din Scornicești" ("Ceaușescu, who are you? A criminal from Scornicești").

=== Street confrontations ===
As the hours passed many more people took to the streets. Soon the protesters—unarmed and unorganised—were confronted by soldiers, tanks, APCs, USLA troops (Unitatea Specială pentru Lupta Antiteroristă, anti-terrorist special squads) and armed plainclothes Securitate officers. The crowd was soon being shot at from various buildings, side streets and tanks.

There were many casualties, including deaths, as victims were shot, clubbed to death, stabbed and crushed by armoured vehicles. One APC drove into the crowd around the InterContinental Hotel, crushing people. Physician Florin Filipoiu, who took part in the protests at the InterContinental, declared in a 2010 interview that "it was only an illusion that the Army was on the revolutionaries' side." A French journalist, Jean-Louis Calderon, was killed. A street near University Square was later named after him, as well as a high school in Timișoara. Belgian journalist Danny Huwé was shot and killed on 23 or 24 December 1989.

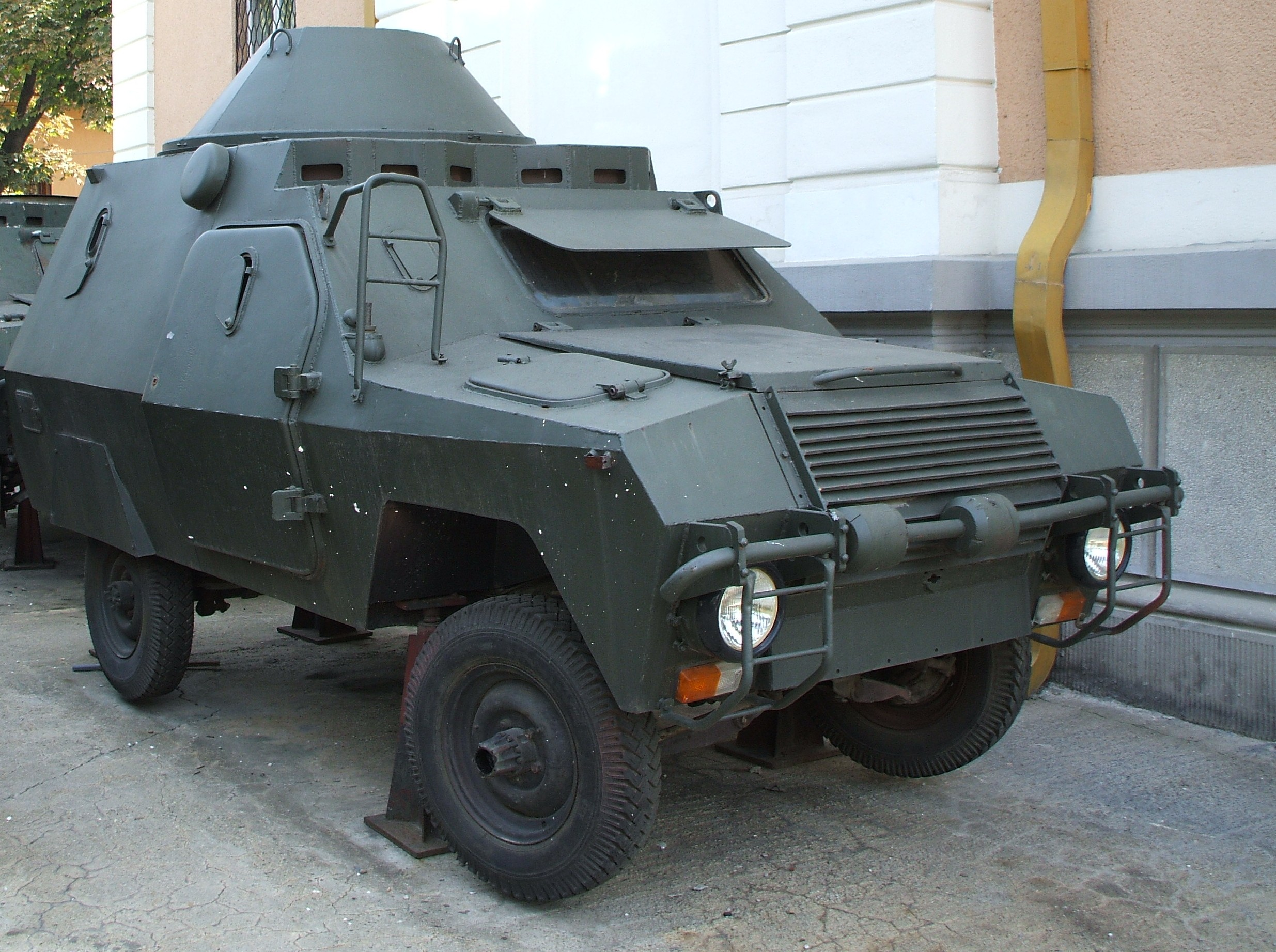
An ABI armoured car used by the USLA in December 1989

Firefighters hit the demonstrators with powerful water cannons, and the police continued to beat and arrest people. Protesters managed to build a defensible barricade in front of the Dunărea ("Danube") restaurant, which stood until after midnight, but was finally torn apart by government forces. Intense shooting continued until after 03:00, by which time the survivors had fled the streets.

Records of the fighting that day include footage shot from helicopters that were sent to raid the area and record evidence for eventual reprisals, as well as by tourists in the high tower of the centrally located InterContinental Hotel, next to the National Theatre and across the street from the university.

It is likely that in the early hours of 22 December that the Ceaușescus made their second mistake. Instead of fleeing the city under cover of night, they decided to wait until morning to leave. Ceaușescu must have thought that his desperate attempts to crush the protests had succeeded, because he apparently called another meeting for the next morning. However, before 07:00, his wife Elena received the news that large columns of workers from many industrial platforms (large communist-era factories or groups of factories concentrated into industrial zones) were heading towards the city centre of Bucharest to join the protests. The police barricades that were meant to block access to Piața Universității (University Square) and Palace Square proved useless. By 09:30 University Square was jammed with protesters. Security forces (army, police and others) re-entered the area, only to join with the protesters.

By 10:00, as the radio broadcast was announcing the introduction of martial law and a ban on groups larger than five persons, hundreds of thousands of people were gathering for the first time, spontaneously, in central Bucharest (the previous day's crowd had come together at Ceaușescu's orders). Ceaușescu attempted to address the crowd from the balcony of the Central Committee of the Communist Party building, but his attempt was met with a wave of disapproval and anger. Helicopters spread manifestos (which did not reach the crowd, due to unfavourable winds) instructing people not to fall victim to the latest "diversion attempts," but to go home instead and enjoy the Christmas feast. This order, which drew unfavourable comparisons to Marie Antoinette's haughty (but apocryphal) "Let them eat cake", further infuriated the people who did read the manifestos; many at that time had trouble procuring basic foodstuffs such as cooking oil.

== Military defection and Ceaușescu's fall ==
At approximately 09:30 on the morning of 22 December Vasile Milea, Ceaușescu's minister of defence, died under suspicious circumstances. A communiqué by Ceaușescu stated that Milea had been sacked for treason, and that he had committed suicide after his treason was revealed. The most widespread opinion at the time was that Milea hesitated to follow Ceaușescu's orders to fire on the demonstrators, even though tanks had been dispatched to downtown Bucharest that morning. Milea was already in severe disfavour with Ceaușescu for initially sending soldiers to Timișoara without live ammunition. Rank-and-file soldiers believed that Milea had actually been murdered and went over virtually en masse to the revolution. Senior commanders wrote off Ceaușescu as a lost cause and made no effort to keep their men loyal to the regime. This effectively ended any chance of Ceaușescu staying in power.

Accounts differ about how Milea died. His family and several junior officers believed he had been shot in his own office by the Securitate, while another group of officers believed he had committed suicide. In 2005 an investigation concluded that the minister killed himself by shooting at his heart, but the bullet missed the heart, hit a nearby artery and led to his death shortly afterward. Some believe that he only tried to incapacitate himself in order to be relieved from office, but it is unclear then why he would shoot in the direction of the heart and not something non-vital like arms or legs.

Upon learning of Milea's death, Ceaușescu appointed Victor Stănculescu minister of defence. He accepted after a brief hesitation. Stănculescu, however, ordered the troops back to their quarters without Ceaușescu's knowledge, and also persuaded Ceaușescu to leave by helicopter, thus making the dictator a fugitive. At that same moment angry protesters began storming the Communist Party headquarters; Stănculescu and the soldiers under his command did not oppose them.

By refusing to carry out Ceaușescu's orders (he was still technically commander-in-chief of the army), Stănculescu played a central role in the overthrow of the dictatorship. "I had the prospect of two execution squads: Ceaușescu's and the revolutionary one!" confessed Stănculescu later. In the afternoon, Stănculescu "chose" Ion Iliescu's political group from among others that were striving for power in the aftermath of the recent events.

=== Helicopter evacuation and capture ===
Following Ceaușescu's second failed attempt to address the crowd, he and Elena fled into a lift headed for the roof. A group of protesters managed to force their way into the building, overpowered Ceaușescu's bodyguards and made their way through his office before heading onto the balcony. They were unaware they were only a few metres from Ceaușescu. The lift's electricity failed just before it reached the top floor, and Ceaușescu's bodyguards forced it open and ushered the couple onto the roof.

At 11:20 on 22 December 1989, Ceaușescu's personal pilot, Lieutenant Colonel Vasile Maluțan, received instructions from Lieutenant General Opruta to proceed to Palace Square to pick up the president. As he flew over Palace Square he saw it was impossible to land there. Maluțan landed his white Dauphin, #203, on the terrace at 11:44. A man brandishing a white net curtain from one of the windows waved him down.

Maluțan said, "Then Stelică, the co-pilot, came to me and said that there were demonstrators coming to the terrace. Then the Ceaușescus came out, both practically carried by their bodyguards ... They looked as if they were fainting. They were white with terror. Manea Mănescu [one of the vice-presidents] and Emil Bobu were running behind them. Mănescu, Bobu, Neagoe and another Securitate officer scrambled to the four seats in the back ... As I pulled Ceaușescu in, I saw the demonstrators running across the terrace ... There wasn't enough space, Elena Ceaușescu and I were squeezed in between the chairs and the door ... We were only supposed to carry four passengers ... We had six."

According to Maluțan, it was 12:08 when they left for Snagov. After they arrived there, Ceaușescu took Maluțan into the presidential suite and ordered him to get two helicopters filled with soldiers for an armed guard, and a further Dauphin to come to Snagov. Maluțan's unit commander replied on the phone, "There has been a revolution ... You are on your own ... Good luck!" Maluțan then said to Ceaușescu that the second motor was now warmed up and they needed to leave soon but he could only take four people, not six. Mănescu and Bobu stayed behind. Ceaușescu ordered Maluțan to head for Titu. Near Titu, Maluțan says that he received the national flights denial and had to land to not get shot down by the army.

He did so in a field next to the old road that led to Pitești. Maluțan then told his four passengers that he could do nothing more. The Securitate men ran to the roadside and began to flag down passing cars. Two cars stopped, one of them driven by a forestry official and one a red Dacia driven by a local doctor. However, the doctor was not happy about getting involved and, after a short time driving the Ceaușescus, faked engine trouble. A bicycle repairman was then flagged down and drove them in his car to Târgoviște. The repairman, Nicolae Petrișor, convinced them that they could hide in an agricultural technical institute on the edge of town. When they arrived, the director there guided the Ceaușescus into a room and then locked them in. They were arrested by local police at about 15:30, then after some wandering around, transported to the Târgoviște garrison's military compound and held captive for several days until their trial.

=== Trial and execution ===
On 24 December Ion Iliescu, head of the newly formed Council of the National Salvation Front (FSN), signed a decree establishing the Extraordinary Military Tribunal, a drumhead court-martial to try the Ceaușescus for genocide and other crimes. The trial was held on 25 December, lasted for about two hours and delivered death sentences to the couple. Although nominally the Ceaușescus had a right of appeal, their execution followed immediately, just outside the improvised courtroom, being carried out by three paratroopers with their service rifles.

Footage of the trial and of the executed Ceaușescus was promptly released in Romania and to the rest of the world. The actual moment of execution was not filmed; the cameraman only managed to get into the courtyard just as the shooting ended.

In footage of the trial, Nicolae Ceaușescu is seen answering the ad hoc tribunal judging him and referring to some of its members—among them Army General Victor Atanasie Stănculescu and future Romanian Secret Service head Virgil Măgureanu—as "traitors". In the same video, Ceaușescu dismisses the "tribunal" as illegitimate and demands his constitutional rights to answer to charges in front of a legitimate tribunal.

== New government ==
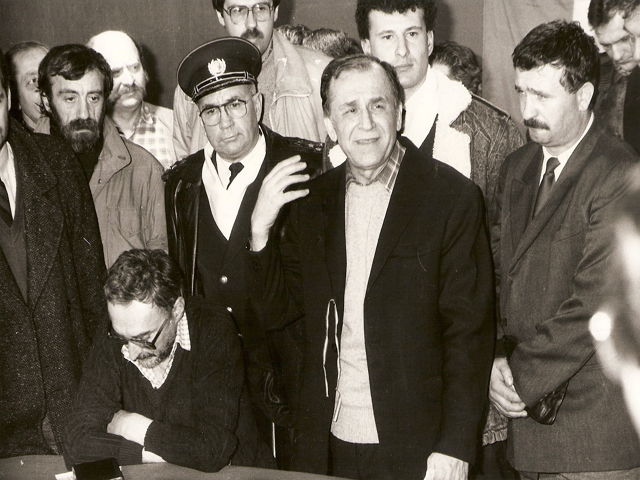
Ion Iliescu at the Romanian Television during the Romanian revolution of 1989

After Ceaușescu left, the mood of the crowds in Palace Square grew celebratory, perhaps even more than in the other former Eastern Bloc countries because of the recent violence. People cried, shouted and gave each other gifts mainly because it was also close to Christmas Day, a long-suppressed holiday in Romania. The occupation of the Central Committee building continued.

People threw Ceaușescu's writings, official portraits and propaganda books out the windows, intending to burn them. They also promptly ripped off the giant letters from the roof making up the word "comunist" ("communist") in the slogan: "Trăiască Partidul Comunist Român!" ("Long live the Communist Party of Romania!"). A young woman appeared on the rooftop and waved a flag with the coat of arms torn out.

At that time, fierce fights were underway at Bucharest Otopeni International Airport between troops sent against each other with the claim that they were going to confront terrorists. Early in the morning, troops sent to reinforce the airport were fired upon. These troops were from the UM 0865 Câmpina military base, and were summoned there by General Ion Rus, commander of the Romanian Air Force. The confrontation resulted in the deaths of 40 soldiers, as well as eight civilians. The military trucks were allowed entrance into the airport's perimeter, passing several checkpoints. However, after passing the last checkpoint, they were fired upon from different directions. A civilian bus was also fired upon during the firefight. After the firefight, the surviving soldiers were taken prisoner by the troops guarding the airport, who seemed to think that they were loyal to Ceaușescu's regime.

=== Fighting and continued violence ===
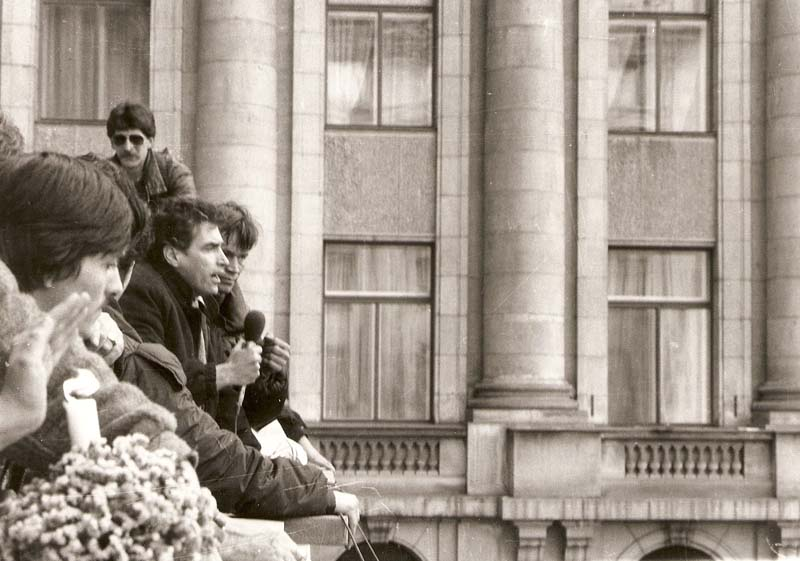
Petre Roman speaking to the crowd in Bucharest.

There has yet to be any academic evidence for the idea that there were significant forces considered loyal to the old regime. Rather, the continued fighting which was seen after the flight of Ceaușescu is believed to have been a result of mistaken exchanges of fire from the general population and armed forces. There has been no academic evidence to suggest that Securitate units fought against the revolution. The origins of this story can be found in the speech given on 22 December by Army Captain Mihail Lupoi. During this speech, he asserts that it was only the Securitate who had shot protesters before the 22nd and that the Securitate needs to come onto the side of the army. This placed the deaths of protesters by the army onto the shoulders of the Securitate. But both the army and Securitate had shot and killed protesters before the 22nd.

The vast majority of deaths came from the period between 22 and 25 December. On the 22nd, a small group of individuals which would later comprise the core of the National Salvation Front (Romanian: Frontul Salvării Naționale, FSN), called for a mass mobilisation of people for the defence of the television station. This call to arms resulted in the accumulation of army personnel, patriotic guards (both in and out of uniform) and armed civilians guarding the station. Later the same evening, there was an announcement that a convoy of anti-terrorist units were heading for the television centre. This was not so, but it added to the extremely tense environment which had been building since the flight of Ceaușescu.

When gunfights finally erupted outside and around the television studio, they were almost always the result of miscommunication. One such example is when a group of Patriotic Guardsmen took up a defensive position in a building close to the television centre on the 23rd. It has not been established who took the first shots at around 17:00, but a gunfight soon ensued with those in the television station returning fire onto the position of the Patriotic guards, according to an aid worker who had set up a first aid station at the side of the television station, and who said that, afterwards, the group of Patriotic Guardsmen would later deny that they had fired first. This is only one of many examples of gunfights between pro-revolution forces after the flight of Ceaușescu on the 22nd.

Scenes of major gunfights during this period include the television, radio and telephone buildings, as well as Casa Scânteii (the nation's print media center, which serves a similar role today under the name of the "House of the Free Press", Casa Presei Libere) and the post office in the district of Drumul Taberei; Palace Square (site of the Central Committee building, but also of the Central University Library, the national art museum in the former Royal Palace, and the Ateneul Român (Romanian Athenaeum), Bucharest's leading concert hall); the university and the adjoining University Square (one of the city's main intersections); Otopeni and Băneasa airports; hospitals; and the Ministry of Defence.

During the night of 22–23 December, Bucharest residents remained on the streets, especially in areas under attack, fighting (and ultimately winning, at the cost of many lives) a battle with an elusive and dangerous enemy. With the military confused by contradictory orders, actual battles ensued, with many real casualties. At 21:00 on 23 December, tanks and a few paramilitary units arrived to protect the Palace of the Republic.

Meanwhile, messages of support were flooding in from all over the world: France (President François Mitterrand); the Soviet Union (General Secretary Mikhail Gorbachev); Hungary (the Hungarian Socialist Party); the new East German government (at that time the two German states were not yet formally reunited); Bulgaria (Petar Mladenov, General Secretary of the Bulgarian Communist Party); Czechoslovakia (Ladislav Adamec, leader of the Communist Party of Czechoslovakia, and Václav Havel, the dissident writer, revolution leader and future president of the Republic); China (the Minister of Foreign Affairs); the United States (President George H. W. Bush); Canada (Prime Minister Brian Mulroney); West Germany (Foreign Minister Hans Dietrich Genscher); NATO (Secretary General Manfred Wörner); the United Kingdom (Prime Minister Margaret Thatcher); Spain; Austria; the Netherlands; Italy; Portugal; Japan (the Japanese Communist Party); SFR Yugoslavia government; and Moldavian SSR.

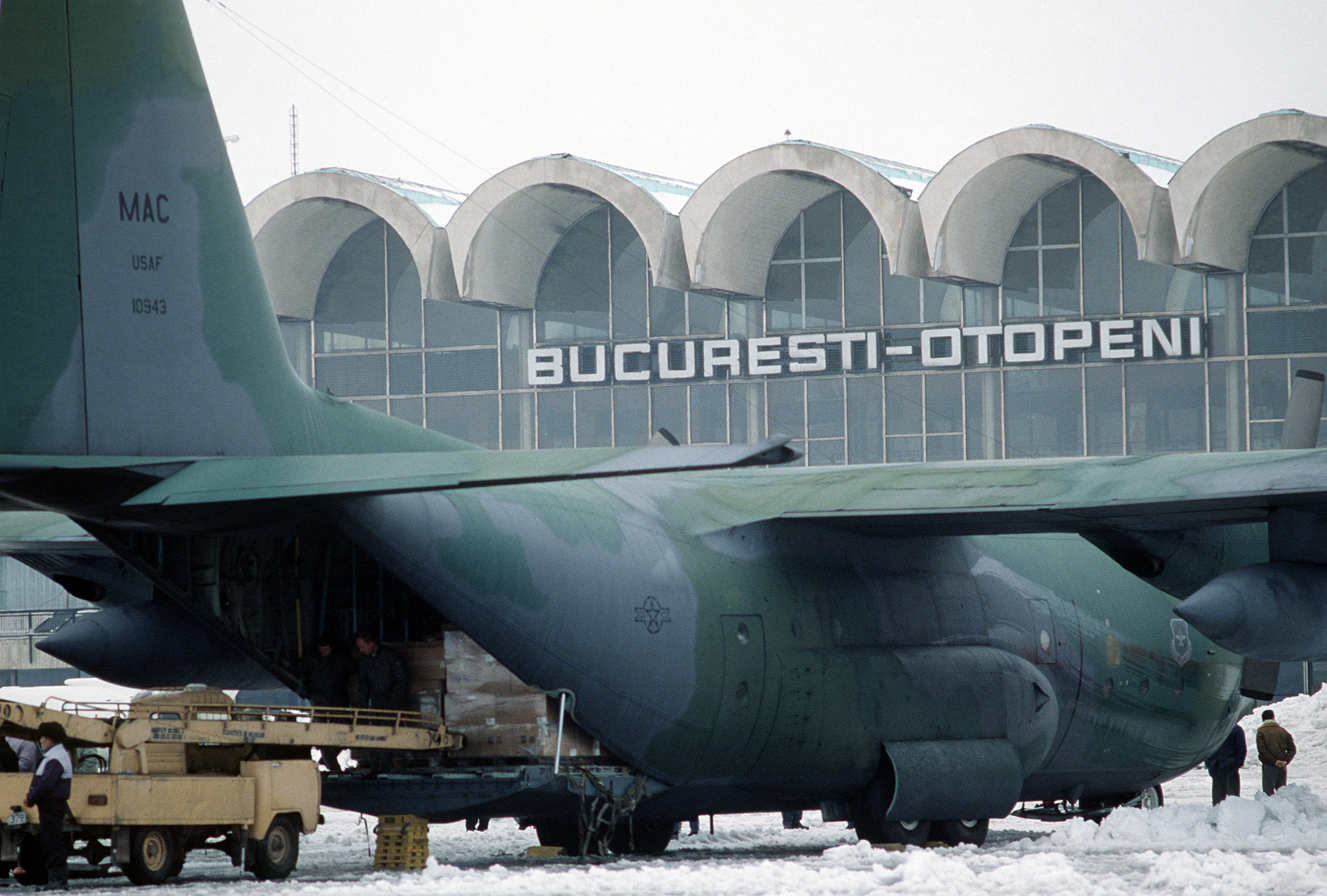
USAF C-130 Hercules unloads medical supplies at the Otopeni Airport on 31 December.

In the following days, moral support was followed by material support. Large quantities of food, medicine, clothing, medical equipment, and other humanitarian aid were sent to Romania. Around the world, the press dedicated entire pages and sometimes even complete issues to the Romanian revolution and its leaders.

On 24 December, Bucharest was still a city at war. Tanks, APCs and trucks continued to patrol the city and surround trouble spots in order to protect them. At intersections near strategic objectives, roadblocks were built; automatic gunfire continued in and around University Square, the Gara de Nord (the city's main railroad station) and Palace Square. Yet amid the chaos, some people were seen clutching makeshift Christmas trees. Doctors at one Bucharest hospital reported not sleeping for days and treating as many as 3,000 civilians due to the fighting. "Terrorist activities" continued until 27 December, when they abruptly stopped. Nobody ever found out who conducted them, or who ordered them stopped. The Central University Library was burned down in uncertain circumstances and over 500,000 books, along with about 3,700 manuscripts, were destroyed.

=== Casualties ===
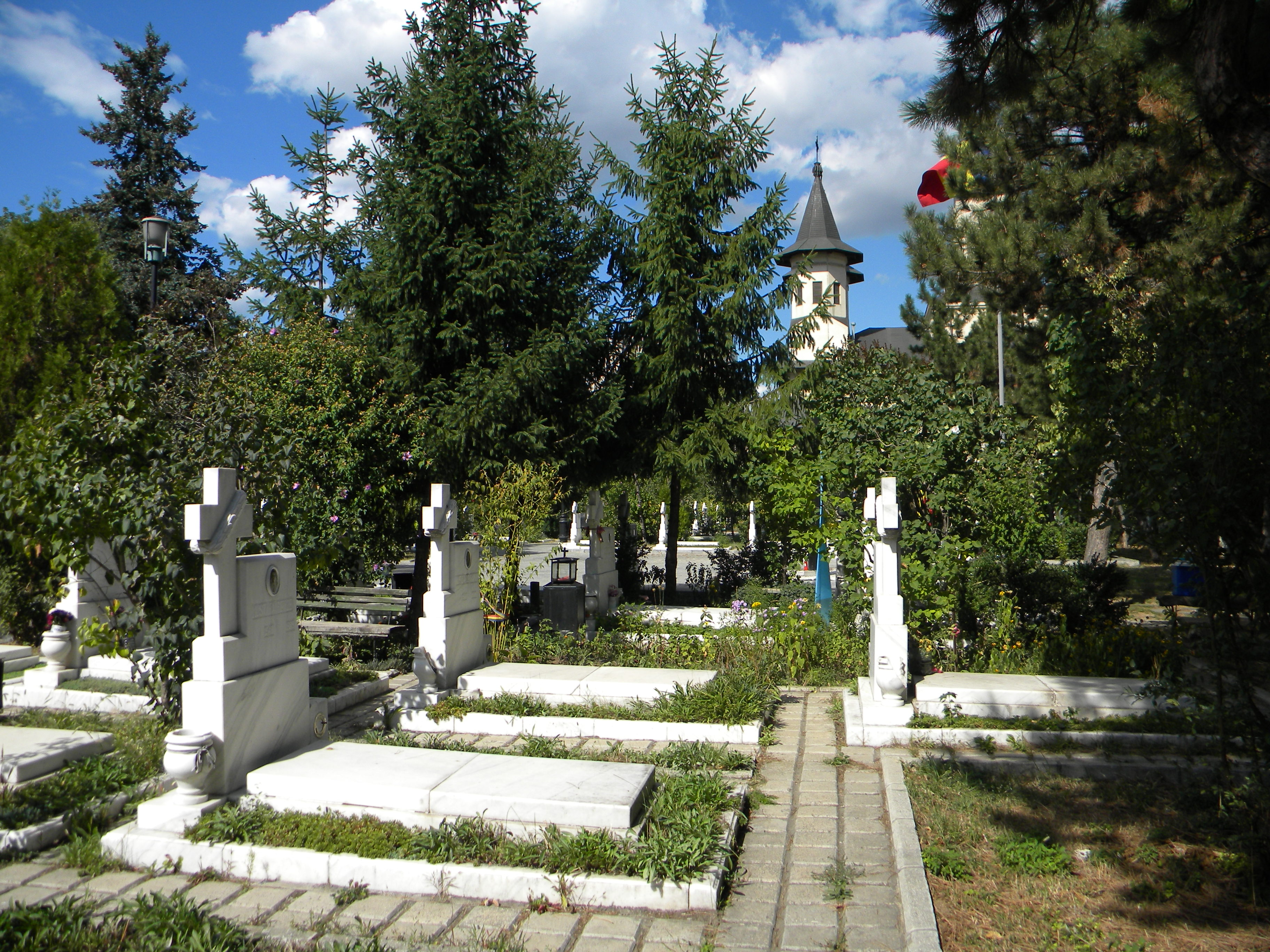
Cemetery of the Heroes Fallen in the December 1989 Revolution, Bucharest

The total number of deaths in the Romanian revolution was 1,104, of which 162 were from the protests that led to the overthrow of Ceaușescu (16–22 December 1989) and 942 during the fighting that occurred after the seizure of power by the new FSN. The number of wounded was 3,352, of which 1,107 occurred while Ceaușescu was still in power and 2,245 after the FSN took power. Official figures place the death toll of the revolution at 689 people, many of whom were civilians.

Figures by FSN officials in January 1990 claimed that as many as 7,000 people died during four days of bitter street fighting in December.

== Aftermath ==
=== Political changes ===
The revolution brought Romania vast attention from the outside world. Initially, much of the world's sympathy went to the FSN government under Ion Iliescu, a former member of the CPR leadership and a Ceaușescu ally prior to falling into the dictator's disfavour in the early 1980s. The FSN, composed mainly of former members of the second echelon of the CPR, immediately assumed control over the state institutions, including the main media outlets such as the national radio and television networks. They used their control of the media to launch attacks against their political opponents, newly created political parties that claimed to be successors to those existing before 1948. Around the same time, all Romanian numbers stations ceased transmitting, including a number station called "Ciocârlia/The Skylark", also known as "V01" after the revolution.

Much of that sympathy was squandered during the Mineriads. Massive protests erupted in downtown Bucharest as political rallies organised by the opposition parties during the presidential elections, with a small part of the protesters deciding to stand ground even after Iliescu was re-elected with an overwhelming majority of 85%. Attempts by police to evacuate the remaining protesters resulted in attacks on state institutions, prompting Iliescu to appeal to the country's workers for help. Infiltrated and instigated by former Securitate agents, in the following days a large mass of workers, mainly miners, entered Bucharest and attacked and fought with anti-government protesters and gathered bystanders.

On the eve of the first free post-communist elections day (20 May 1990), Silviu Brucan—who was part of the FSN—argued that the 1989 revolution was not anti-communist, being only against Ceaușescu. He stated that Ion Iliescu made a "monumental" mistake in "conceding to the crowd" and banning the PCR.

=== Economic reforms ===
The FSN had to choose between the two economic models that political elites claimed were available to post-Communist Eastern European countries: shock therapy or gradual reforms. The FSN chose the latter, slower reforms, because it would have not been possible to convince the people who were already "exhausted" after Ceaușescu's austerity to undergo further sacrifices. Nevertheless, neoliberal reforms were implemented, although not all at once: by the end of 1990, prices were liberalised and a free currency exchange rate was implemented, devaluing the leu by 60%. The land of the state-owned collective farms was distributed to private owners and a list of 708 large state-owned enterprises to be privatised was devised.

In 1991 Romania signed an agreement with the IMF and began the privatisation of state-owned enterprises, with the first privatisation law being passed in 1991. In 1992, the Stolojan government began an austerity plan, limiting wages and further liberalising prices. The economic situation deteriorated and inflation as well as unemployment increased substantially. The austerity measures, which by 1995 included a decrease in social spending, led to an increase in poverty. The neoliberal reforms were accelerated after the Democratic Convention won the 1996 elections, the government using its prerogatives to pass a package of laws, removing subsidies, passing reforms on unemployment benefits and greatly increasing the number of privatised companies.

=== Competing narratives ===
In the years immediately following the revolution, narratives applied both by Romanians and the international audience competed for an interpretation of the events of 1989. Within Romania, myths interpreting it as "false" or "stolen" by the FSN correlated to one's level of disagreement with the political organization, while those painting the events as a pure, "spontaneous revolution" largely aligned with support for the FSN. In addition, the FSN itself attempted to construct its own narrative of the revolution, with its leaders placed abruptly at the center by popular will. This interpretation was largely challenged by FSN opponents.

Outside Romania, public audiences in Western Europe initially projected generally idealistic notions of revolution on the country; the legacies of the French Revolution were fresh on people's minds in 1989 during its two-hundredth anniversary. However, as violence continued into 1990 and reports reached the West of mass casualties, this projected narrative shifted into a less sympathetic one characterized by disappointment in and suspicion of the revolution's direction.

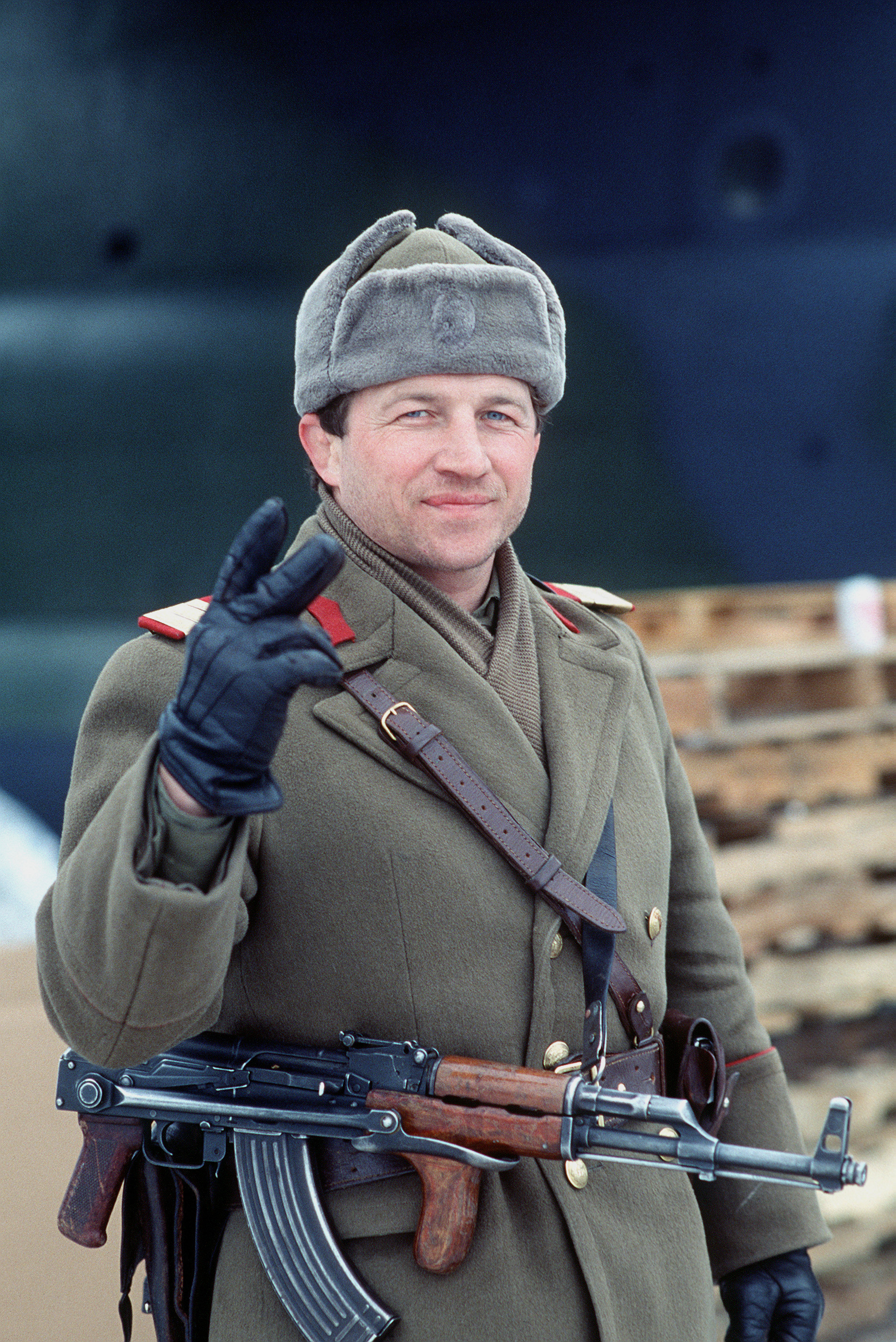
A Romanian sub-officer gives the victory sign on New Year's Eve 1989. He has removed the communist insignia from his ushanka.

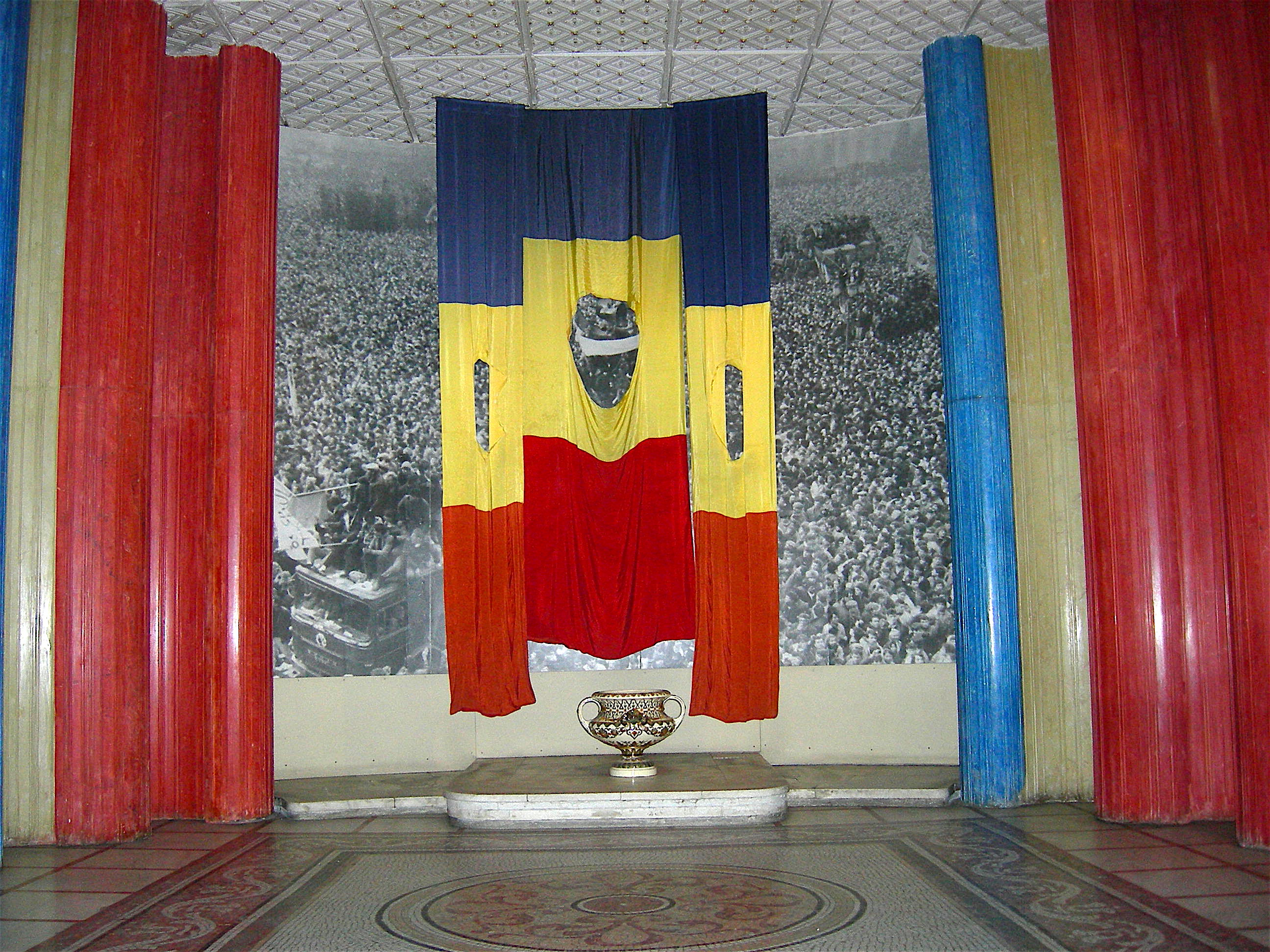
"Empty" Romanian flags with the communist insignia cut out, on the model of the Hungarian flags, pierced in the Revolution of 1956, from an exhibit at the Military Museum, Bucharest

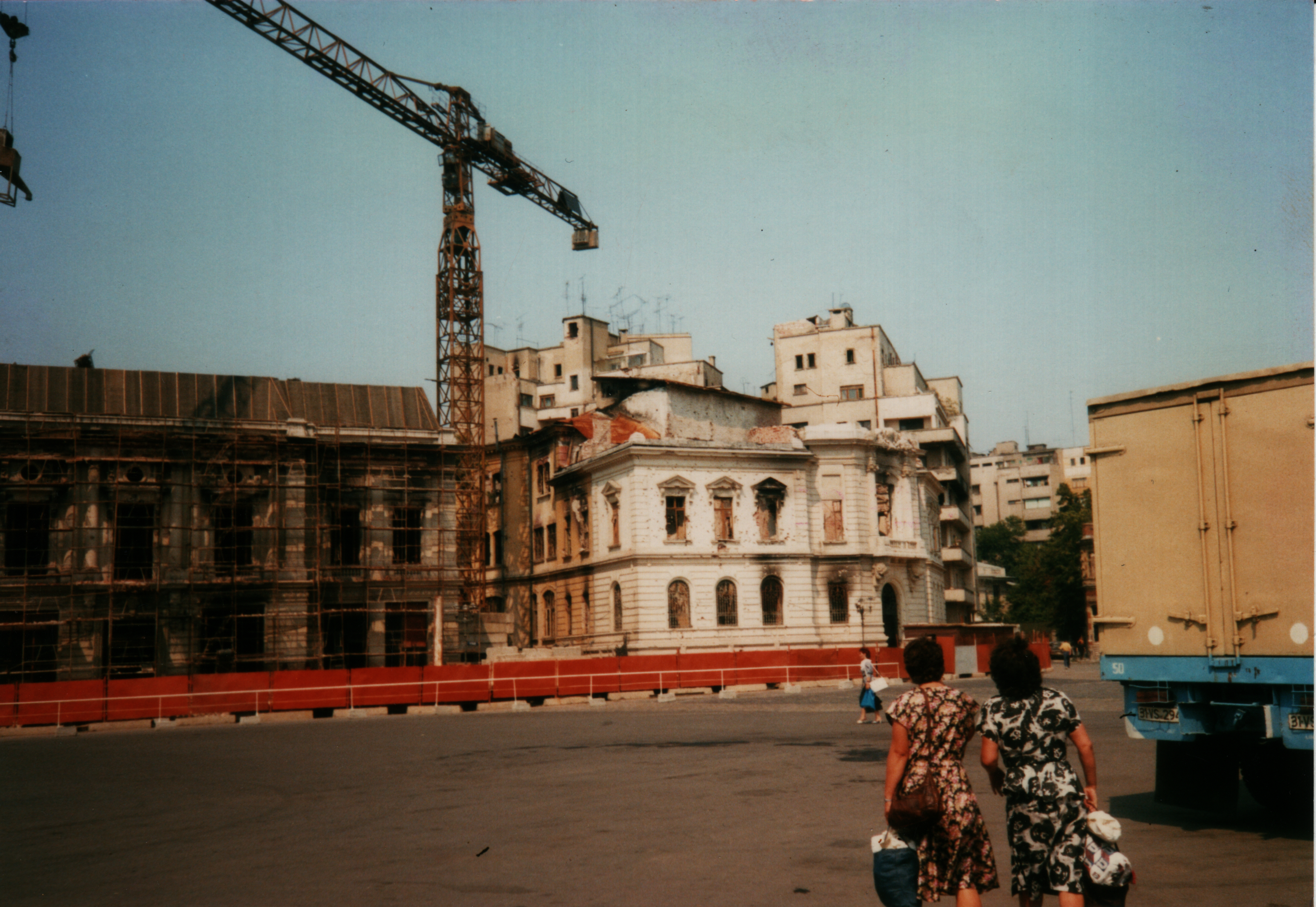
Buildings marked by fire and bullet holes on the northern edge of Revolution Square, Bucharest, July 1990

== See also ==
=== Romanian Revolution ===
- List of books about the Romanian Revolution
- List of films about the Romanian Revolution
- Ilie Verdeț, tried to take over power on 22 Dec 1989, but was pushed aside by I. Iliescu
- Videograms of a Revolution

=== Romania-related ===
- List of massacres in Romania
- Romanian anti-communist resistance movement

=== 1989 revolutions and fall of USSR ===
- Dissolution of the Soviet Union (1991)
- Revolutions of 1989
  - 1989 Moldovan civil unrest
  - End of Communism in Hungary (1989)
  - Fall of communism in Albania (1990–92)
  - Mongolian Revolution of 1990
  - Peaceful Revolution "die Wende" (Germany 1989–90)
    - Fall of the Berlin Wall (November 9, 1989)
  - Singing Revolution (Baltic countries: Estonia, Latvia, Lithuania; 1987–1991)
  - Velvet Revolution (Czechoslovakia, 1989)

=== Others ===
- 1989 Tiananmen Square protests and massacre
- 8888 Uprising (Burma 1988)
- Democracy in Europe
- People Power Revolution (Philippines, 1986, against F. Marcos)
- July Revolution (Bangladesh, 2024, against Sheikh Hasina)

Preceded by Communist Romania	History of Romania; Romanian revolution	Succeeded by Present Romania
