= List of films about the Romanian Revolution =

This is a list of films about the Romanian Revolution.

== Fiction ==
- Two Deaths, 1995
- Sindromul Timişoara, 2004
- Cincisprezece, 2005
- 12:08 East of Bucharest, 2006
- The Paper Will Be Blue, 2006
- The Way I Spent the End of the World, 2006
- The New Year That Never Came, 2024

== Non-fiction ==
- A Lesson in Dying, date unknown
- A Day in Bucharest, date unknown
- Let There Be Peace in this House, date unknown
- Requiem for Dominic, 1990
- Dateline: 1989, Romania, 1991
- Videograms of a Revolution, 1992
- Dracula's Shadow - The Real Story Behind the Romanian Revolution, 2009
- Stremt 89, 2011
