= Andrei Ujică =

Romanian film director

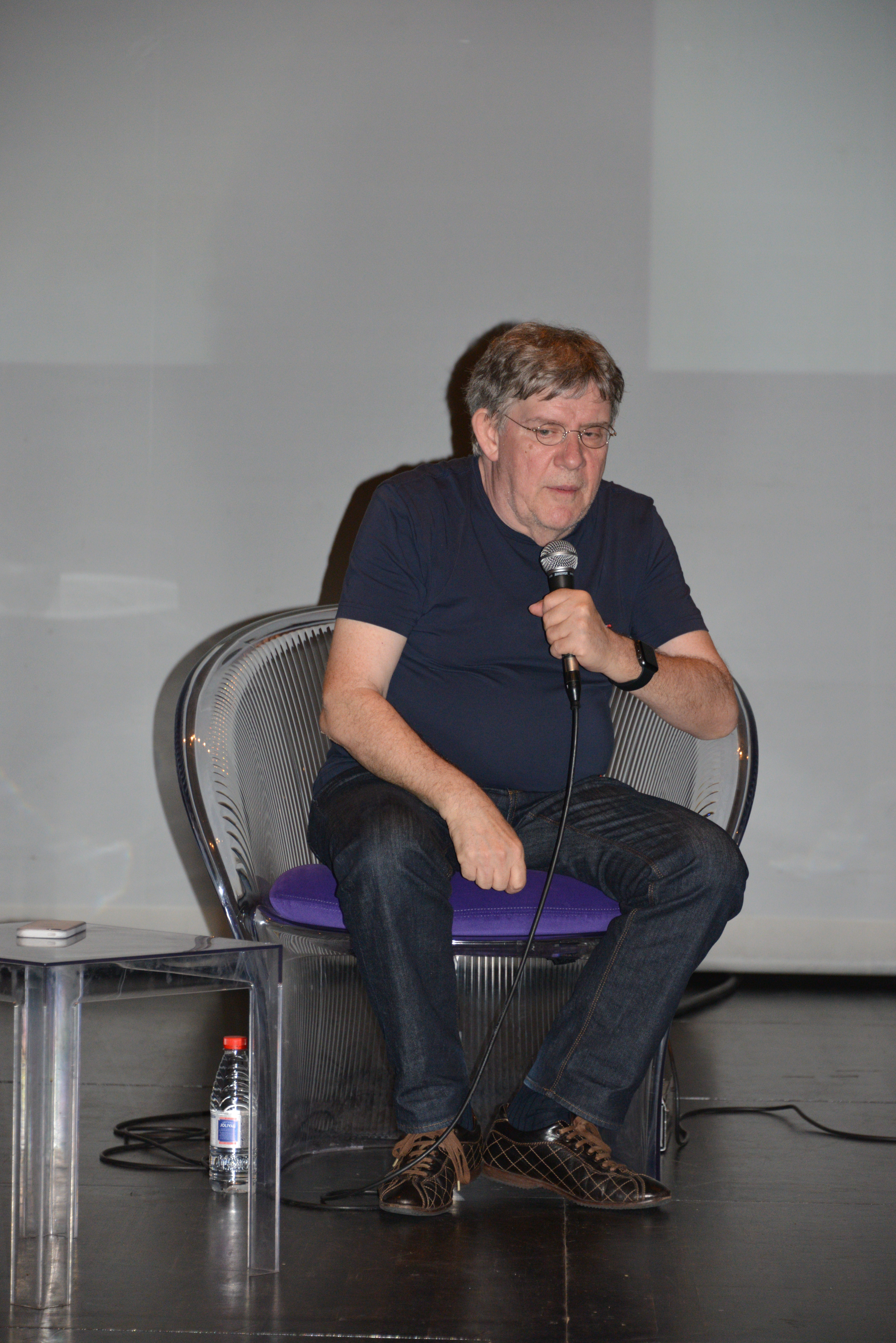
- Andrei Ujică in 2017
- Born: 1951; Timișoara, Romania
- Occupation(s): Film director and screenwriter

Andrei Ujică (born 1951 in Timișoara, Romania) is a Romanian screenwriter and director.

== Life and work ==
Ujică studied literature in Timișoara, Bucharest, and Heidelberg. He moved to Germany in 1981. In 1990 he began making films. Together with Harun Farocki, he created Videograms of a Revolution, a film which has become a standard work in Europe when referring to relationships between political power and the media and the end of the Cold War, and which was listed by the magazine Cahiers du Cinéma as one of the top 10 subversive films of all time.

His next work, Out of the Present, told the story of the cosmonaut Sergei Krikalyov who spent 10 months on board Mir, while back on Earth, the Soviet Union collapsed. The film has been compared to classics such as 2001: A Space Odyssey and Solaris and is considered one of the non-fiction cult films of the 1990s. His 2005 project, Unknown Quantity, creates a fictional conversation between Paul Virilio and Svetlana Alexievich, author of "Voices from Chernobyl", exploring the witness's protocol and the generation of history into catastrophe.

In 2001, Ujică became a film professor at the Karlsruhe University of Arts and Design. He founded the ZKM Film Institute in 2002 and is its director.

== Filmography ==
- 1992: Videograms of a Revolution (director)
- 1992: Kamera und Wirklichkeit (director and screenwriter)
- 1995: Out of the Present (director and screenwriter)
- 2000: 2 Pasolini
- 2005: Unknown Quantity
- 2010: The Autobiography of Nicolae Ceaușescu
- 2024: TWST / Things We Said Today
