= The Autobiography of Nicolae Ceaușescu =

- Directed by: Andrei Ujică
- Produced by: Velvet Moraru
- Starring: Nicolae Ceaușescu; Elena Ceaușescu; Kim Jong-il; Mao Zedong; Richard Nixon; Jimmy Carter; Imelda Marcos; Charles de Gaulle
- Release date: 2010
- Running time: 187 minutes
- Country: Romania
- Language: Romanian

The Autobiography of Nicolae Ceaușescu (Romanian: Autobiografia lui Nicolae Ceaușescu) is a 2010 Romanian documentary film directed by Andrei Ujică.

== Summary ==
The three-hour-long documentary covers 25 years in the life of Nicolae Ceaușescu and was made using 1,000 hours of original footage from the National Archives of Romania.

== Awards ==
- The Autobiography of Nicolae Ceaușescu was awarded the Great Prize of the documentary section of the Bergen International Film Festival.
- In 2010, The Autobiography of Nicolae Ceaușescu won the Best East European Documentary Award at the 14th edition of the International Documentary Film Festival in Jihlava, the Czech Republic.

== See also ==
- 2010 in film
- List of Romanian films
