= TWST / Things We Said Today =

2024 documentary film

- Directed by: Andrei Ujică
- Produced by: Anamaria Antoci; Andrei Ujică; Ronald Chammah
- Starring: Tommy McCabe
- Edited by: Dana Bunescu
- Release date: 4 September 2024 (Venice)
- Countries: France; Romania

TWST / Things We Said Today is a 2024 documentary film written and directed by Andrei Ujică. A co-production between France and Romania, it had its world premiere at the 81st edition of the Venice Film Festival.

== Overview ==
Titled after a 1964 song of the group, the film focuses on the Beatles' concert at Shea Stadium in New York City on 15 August 1965, mostly centering on their fandom, particularly through the dual perspectives of a New York fan and a road-tripping fan. Juxtaposed to the contemporary Watts riots and the World's Fair in Flushing Meadows–Corona Park, the event is also portrayed as a symbolic moment in American history, as the beginning of a youth-driven cultural and political revolution, with values and ideals far from the traditional norm.

== Production ==
The film project began in 2012 and was completed after 12 years of work. It is based on about 100 hours of 16mm newsreel along with nearly 100 hours of 8mm amateur footage.

The film was produced by Les Films du Camélia, Modern Electric Pictures and Tangaj Production.

== Release ==
The film premiered out of competition at the 81st Venice International Film Festival.

== Reception ==
Daniel Fienberg from The Hollywood Reporter described the film as a 'lovely, eye-opening, complexly experiential (and experimental) picture', 'a combination of two nonfiction categories — the tone poem and the city symphony' that 'Ujica blends them with archival rigor and effective whimsy to create a movie that’s dreamy and clear-eyed at once'.

International Cinephile Society's Marc van de Klashorst wrote: 'Conceptually, TWST / Things We Said Today is an intriguing and original way to look at our past and see how history is shaped once all the dust is blown off. Its execution is artistically sound, but at times too unfocused to keep its ideas at the forefront'.
