= Videograms of a Revolution =

1992 documentary film

- German: Videogramme einer Revolution
- Directed by: Harun Farocki; Andrei Ujică
- Written by: Harun Farocki; Andrei Ujică
- Produced by: Harun Farocki
- Narrated by: Thomas Schultz
- Release date: 1992
- Running time: 106 minutes
- Countries: Germany; Romania
- Languages: English; German; Romanian

Videograms of a Revolution is a 1992 documentary film compiled by Harun Farocki and Andrei Ujică from over 125 hours of amateur footage, news footage, and excerpts from the Bucharest TV studio overtaken by demonstrators as part of the December 1989 Romanian Revolution.

In 2004 the Austrian Film Museum selected the documentary as part of its Die Utopie Film program for The Best 100 in Film History list.
