= Cândea =

Cândea is a Romanian surname. Notable people with the surname include:

- Constantin Cândea (1887–1971), Romanian chemist
- Maria Cândea (1889–1974), Romanian teacher and school director
- Romulus Cândea (1886–1973), Austro-Hungarian born Romanian historian
