= Buhoci =

- Commune
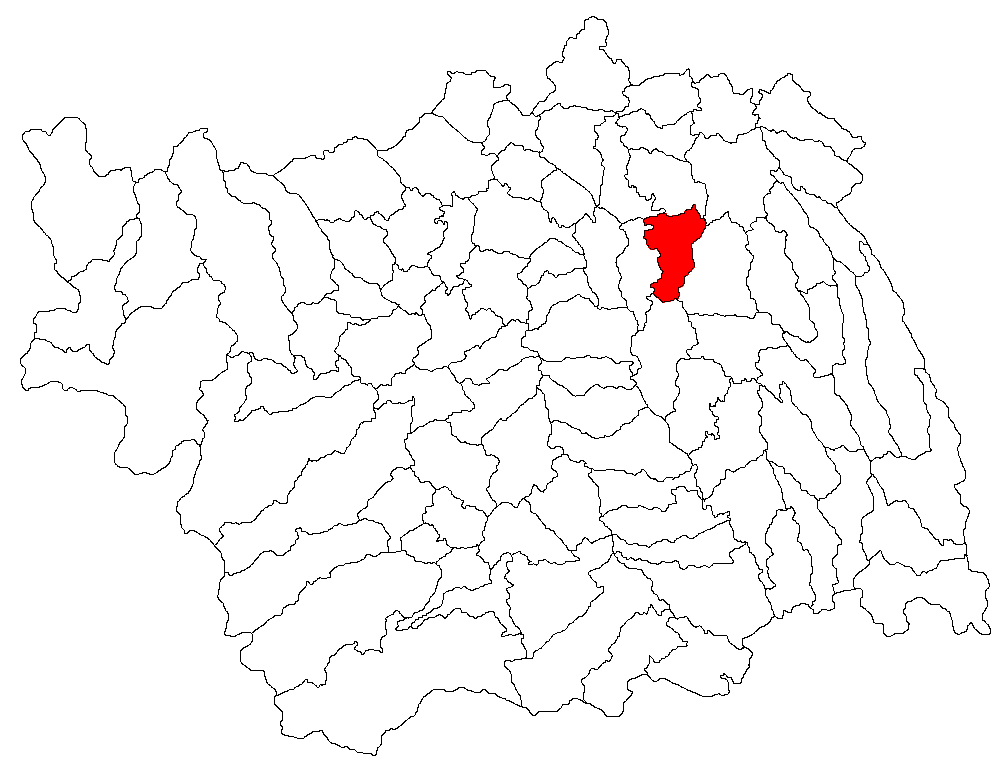
- Location in Bacău County

- Location in Romania
- Coordinates: 46°34′N 27°1′E
- Country: Romania
- County: Bacău

Government
  - Mayor (2020–2024): Cristian Iștoc (PNL)
- Area: 50.51 km^{2} (19.50 sq mi)
- Elevation: 161 m (528 ft)
- Population (2021-12-01): 4,437
  - Density: 88/km^{2} (230/sq mi)
- Time zone: EET/EEST (UTC+2/+3)
- Postal code: 607085
- Area code: +(40) 234
- Vehicle reg.: BC
- Website: comunabuhoci.ro

Buhoci is a commune in Bacău County, Western Moldavia, Romania. It is composed of five villages: Bijghir, Buhocel, Buhoci, Coteni, and Dospinești.

The commune is located in the central part of the county, on the left bank of the Siret River. It is part of the Bacău metropolitan area, which comprises the county seat, Bacău, and several nearby localities. Buhoci is crossed by national road DN2F, which connects Bacău, 7 km (4.3 mi) to the west, to Vaslui, 76 km (47 mi) to the east.

Historical population
Year	Pop.	±%
2002	4,776	—
2011	4,119	−13.8%
2021	4,437	+7.7%
Source: Census data

== Natives ==
- Ioan Borcea (1879 – 1936), zoologist
