= Bacău =

Municipality in Bacău County, Romania

- Municipality
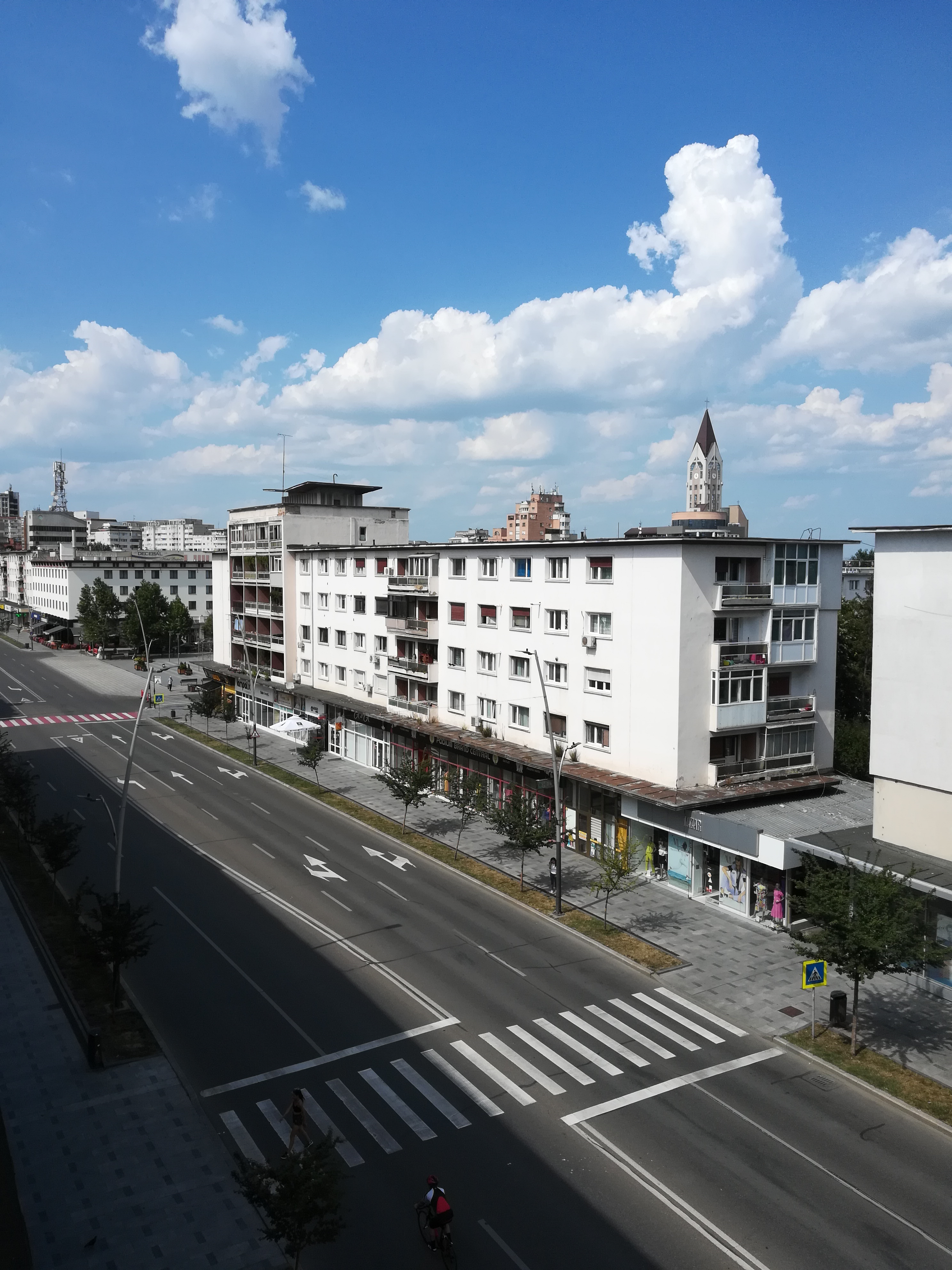
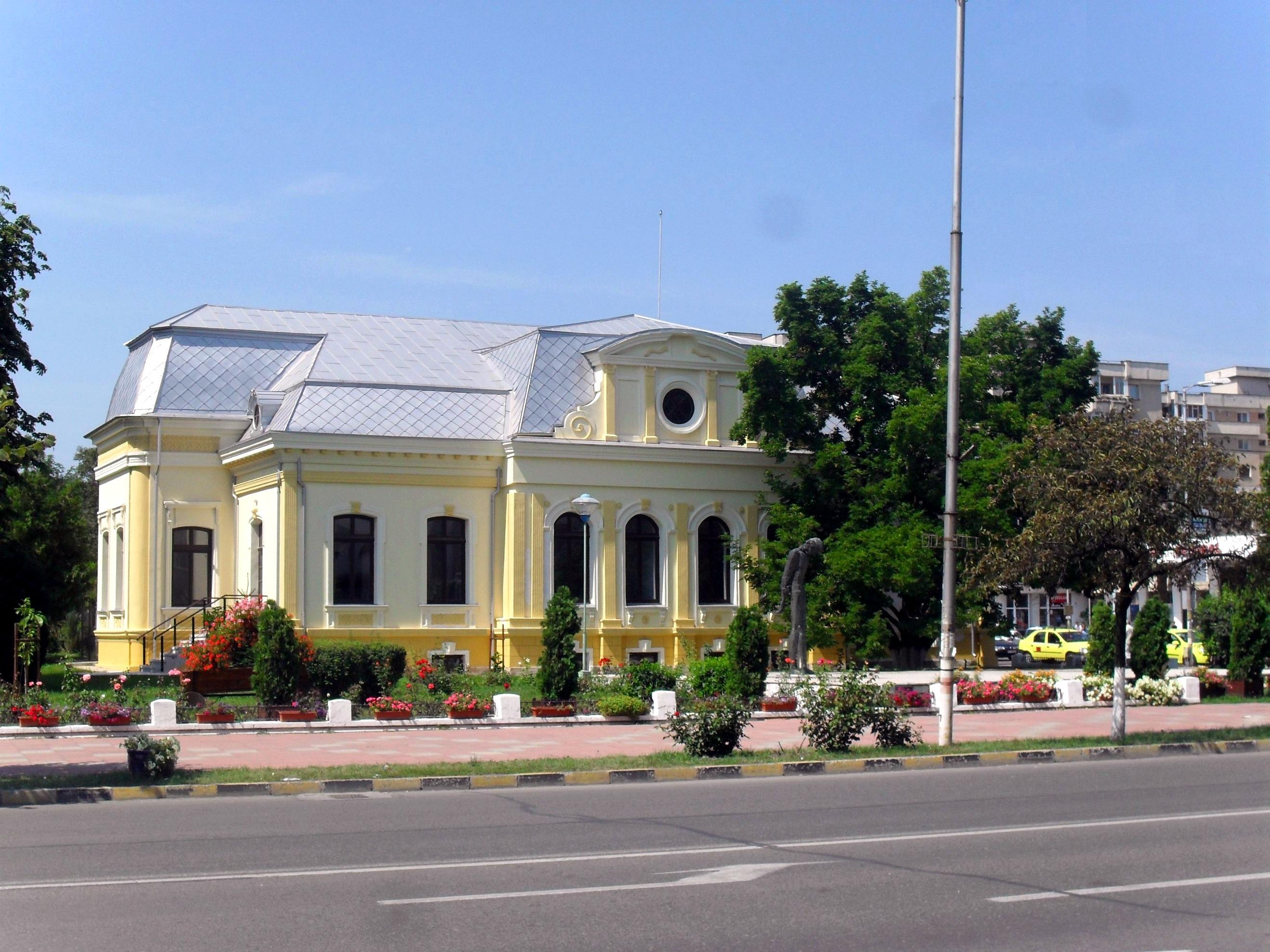
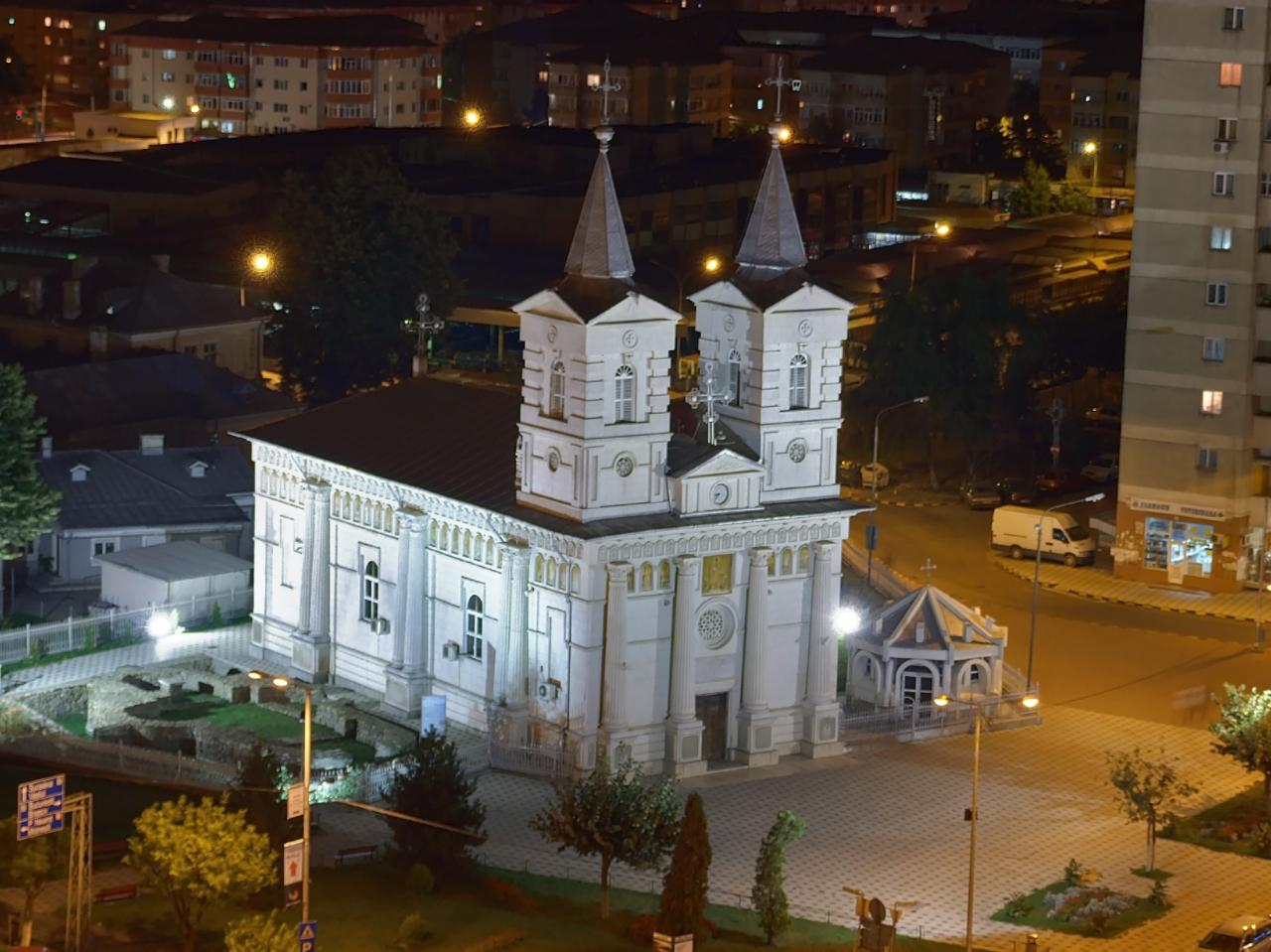
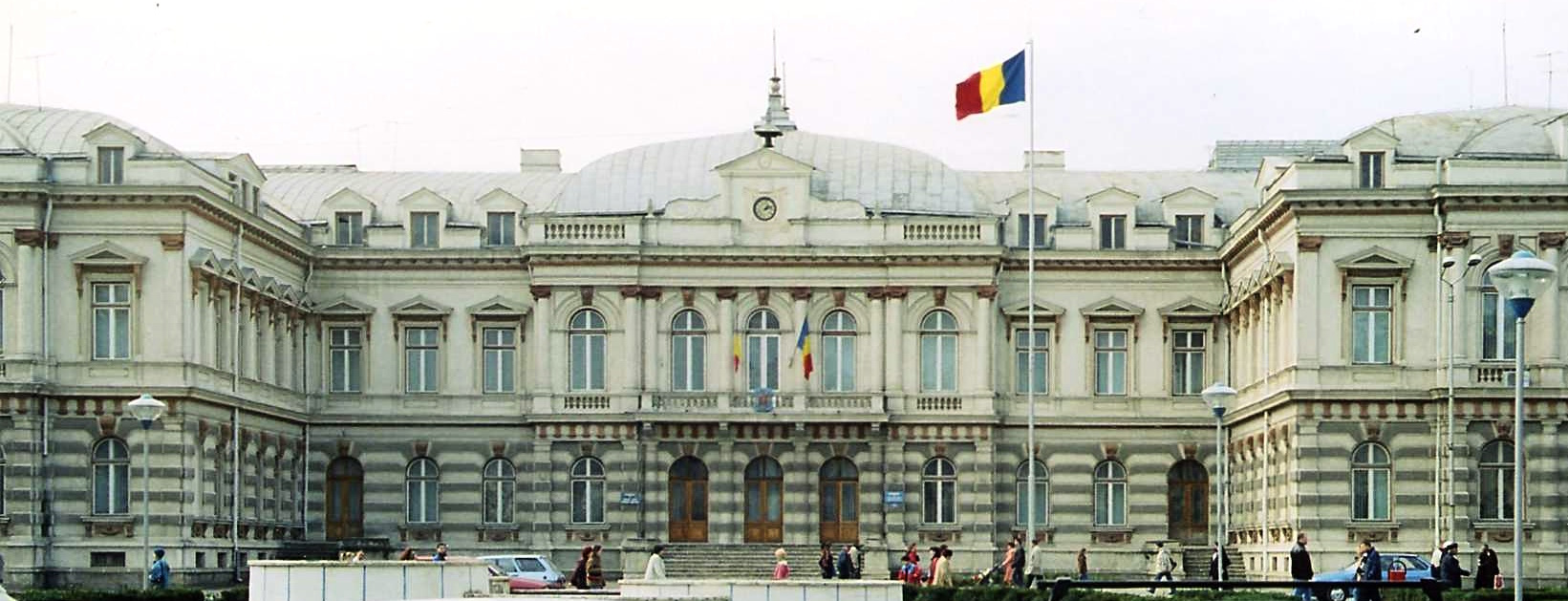
- Cathedral of the Lord's Ascension Mărășești boulevard Library of Bacău Church of St. Nicholas The Prefecture

- Coat of arms

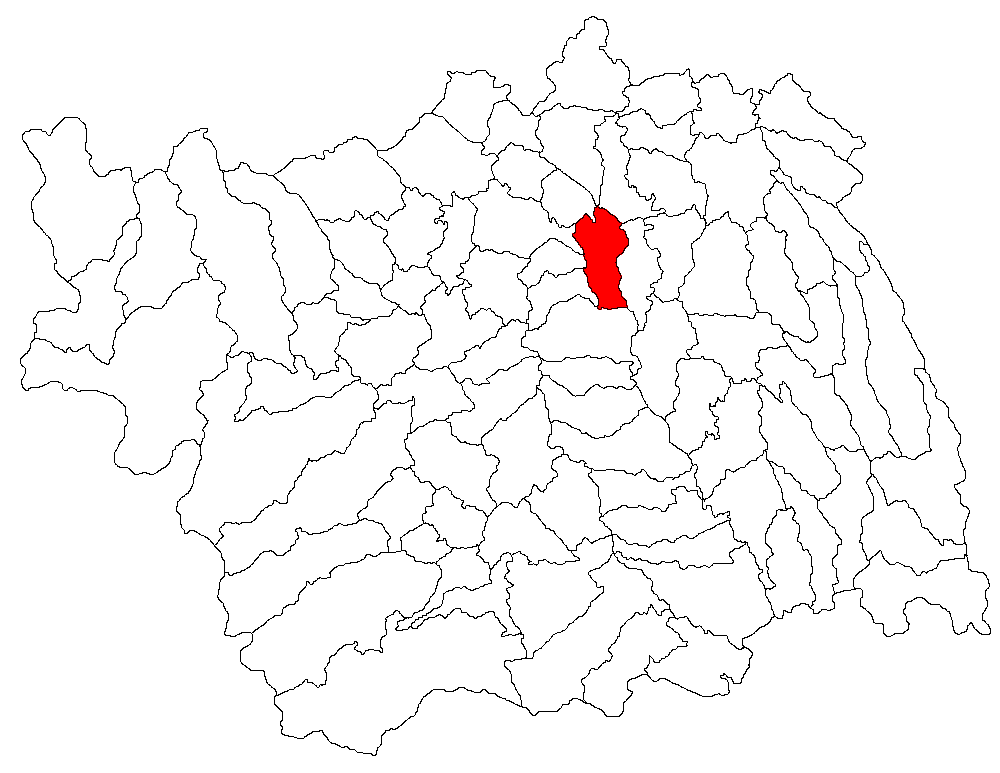
- Location in Bacău County

- Location in Romania
- Coordinates: 46°35′N 26°55′E
- Country: Romania
- County: Bacău
- Established: 1408 (first official record)

Government
  - Mayor (2024–2028): Lucian Stanciu-Viziteu (USR)
- Area: 43.19 km^{2} (16.68 sq mi)
- Elevation: 165 m (541 ft)
- Population (2021-12-01): 136,087
  - Density: 3,151/km^{2} (8,161/sq mi)
- Time zone: UTC+02:00 (EET)
  - Summer (DST): UTC+03:00 (EEST)
- Postal code: 600xxx
- Area code: (+40) 234
- Vehicle reg.: BC
- Website: municipiulbacau.ro

Bacău (UK: /ˈbækaʊ/ BAK-ow; US: /bəˈkaʊ/ bə-KOW, Romanian: [baˈkəw]; Hungarian: Bákó; Latin: Bacovia) is the main city in Bacău County, Romania. With a population of 136,087 (as of 2021 census), Bacău is the 14th largest city in Romania. The city is situated in the historical region of Moldavia, at the foothills of the Carpathian Mountains, and on the Bistrița River (which meets the Siret River about 8 kilometres (5.0 mi) to the south of Bacău). The Ghimeș Pass links Bacău to the region of Transylvania.

== Etymology ==
The town's name, which features in Old Church Slavonic documents as Bako, Bakova or Bakovia, comes most probably from a personal name of Hungarian origin. Men bearing the name Bakó or Bako are documented in medieval Transylvania and in 15th-century Bulgaria, but according to Victor Spinei the name itself is of Turkic – most probably of Cuman or Pecheneg – origin. Nicolae Iorga believes that the city's name is of Hungarian origin (as Adjud and Sascut). Another theory suggests a Slavic origin for the town's name, pointing to the Proto-Slavic word byk, meaning "ox" or "bull", the region being very suitable for raising cattle; the term, rendered into Romanian alphabet as bâc, was probably the origin of Bâcău. In German it is known as Bakau, in Hungarian as Bákó and in Turkish as Baka.

== History ==
Similarly to most urban centers in Moldavia, Bacău emerged on a ford that allowed water passage. There is archaeological evidence of human settlement in the centre of Bacău (near Curtea Domnească) dating from the 6th and the 7th centuries; these settlements were placed over older settlements from the 4th and the 5th centuries. A number of vessels found here are ornamented with crosses, hinting that the inhabitants were Christians. Pechenegs and Cumans controlled the Bistrița valley during the 10th, 11th and 12th centuries. Colonists played a significant role in the development of the town. Archaeological finds, some surface or semi-buried dwellings from the second half of the 15th century, suggest that Hungarians started to settle in the region after 1345–1347 when the territory was under the control of the Kingdom of Hungary. They mainly occupied the flat banks of the river Bistrița. Discoveries of a type of 14th-century grey ceramic that has also been found in Northern Europe also suggests the presence of German colonists from the north. Originally the town focused around the Roman Catholic community that settled near a regular local market frequented by the population of the region on the lower reaches of the river.

The town was first mentioned in 1408 when Prince Alexander the Good of Moldavia (1400–1432) listed the customs points in the principality in his privilege for Polish merchants. The customs house in the town is mentioned in Old Church Slavonic as krainee mîto ("the customs house by the edge") in the document which may indicate that it was the last customs stop before Moldavia's border with Wallachia. An undated document reveals that the șoltuz in Bacău, that is the head of the town elected by its inhabitants, had the right to sentence felons to death, at least for robberies, which hints at an extended privilege, similar to the ones that royal towns in the Kingdom of Hungary enjoyed. Thus this right may have been granted to the community when the territory was under the control of the Kingdom of Hungary. The seal of Bacău was oval which is exceptional in Moldavia where the seals of other towns were round.

Alexander the Good donated the wax collected as part of the tax payable by the town to the nearby Eastern Orthodox Bistrița Monastery. It was most probably his first wife named Margaret who founded the Franciscan Church of the Holy Virgin in Bacău. But the main Catholic church in the town was dedicated to Saint Nicholas. A letter written by John of Rya, the Catholic bishop of Baia refers to Bacău as a civitas which implies the existence of a Catholic bishopric in the town at that time. The letter also reveals that Hussite immigrants who had undergone persecutions in Bohemia, Moravia, or Hungary were settled in the town and granted privileges by Alexander the Good.

The monastery of Bistrița was also granted the income from the customs house of Bacău in 1439. In 1435 Stephen II of Moldavia (1433–1435, 1436–1447) requested the town's judges not to hinder the merchants of Brașov, an important center of the Transylvanian Saxons in their movement. From the 15th century ungureni, that is Romanians from Transylvania began to populate the area north of the marketplace where they would erect an Orthodox church after 1500. A small residence of the princes of Moldova was built in the town in the first half of the 15th century. It was rebuilt and extended under Stephen III the Great of Moldavia (1457–1504) who also erected an Orthodox church within it. But the rulers soon began to donate the neighboring villages that had thereto supplied their local household to monasteries or noblemen. Thus the local princely residence was abandoned after 1500.

The town was invaded and destroyed more than one time in the 15th and 16th centuries. For example, in 1467 King Matthias I of Hungary during his expedition against Stephen the Great set fire to all towns, among them Bacău in his path. The customs records of Brașov shows that few merchants from Bacău crossed the Carpathian Mountains into Transylvania after 1500, and their merchandise had no particularly high value which suggests that the town was declining in this period.

The Catholic bishop of Argeș whose see in Wallachia had been destroyed by the Tatars moved to Bacău in 1597. From the early 17th century the bishops of Bacău were Polish priests who did not reside in the town, but in the Kingdom of Poland. They only travelled time to time to their see in order to collect the tithes.

According to Archbishop Marco Bandini's report of the canonical visitation of 1646, the șoltuz in Bacău was elected among Hungarians one year, and another, among Romanians. The names of most of 12 inhabitants of the town recorded in 1655 also indicate that Hungarians still formed their majority group. In 1670 Archbishop Petrus Parceviop c, the apostolic vicar of Moldavia concluded an agreement with the head of the Franciscan Province of Transylvania on the return of the Bacău monastery to them in order to ensure the spiritual welfare of the local Hungarian community. But the Polish bishop protested against the agreement and the Holy See also refused to ratify it.

Due to the frequent invasions by foreign armies and plundering by the Tatars in the 17th century, many of its Catholic inhabitants abandoned Bacău and took refuge in Transylvania. But in 1851 the Catholic congregation in the town still spoke, sang, and prayed in Hungarian.

The first paper mill in Moldavia was established in the town in 1851. The town was declared a municipality in 1968.

== Climate ==
Bacău has a type of continental climate that falls short of permanent winter snow cover due days averaging above freezing. Winters are also quite dry in the area. Summers are quite rainy due to convection and temperatures are often hot due to its inland location. Due to its mid-latitude location surrounded by a vast landmass, Bacău has a large temperature amplitude by European standards. Since 1980, a record heat of 42.5 °C (108.5 °F) and a record cold of −28 °C (−18 °F) have been measured, which is a net difference of 70.5 °C (126.9 °F).

Climate data for Bacău, Romania (1991–2020 normals, extremes since 1980)
Month	Jan	Feb	Mar	Apr	May	Jun	Jul	Aug	Sep	Oct	Nov	Dec	Year
Record high °C (°F)	18.5 (65.3)	22.4 (72.3)	29.6 (85.3)	32.2 (90.0)	35.6 (96.1)	38.3 (100.9)	40.3 (104.5)	42.5 (108.5)	37.2 (99.0)	34.6 (94.3)	26.6 (79.9)	19.0 (66.2)	42.5 (108.5)
Mean maximum °C (°F)	11.0 (51.8)	14.6 (58.3)	20.5 (68.9)	25.1 (77.2)	30.1 (86.2)	33.1 (91.6)	34.6 (94.3)	34.8 (94.6)	29.9 (85.8)	25.8 (78.4)	19.5 (67.1)	12.6 (54.7)	35.7 (96.3)
Mean daily maximum °C (°F)	1.8 (35.2)	4.3 (39.7)	10.2 (50.4)	17.1 (62.8)	22.9 (73.2)	26.6 (79.9)	28.7 (83.7)	28.5 (83.3)	22.9 (73.2)	16.1 (61.0)	8.7 (47.7)	2.8 (37.0)	15.9 (60.6)
Daily mean °C (°F)	−2.2 (28.0)	−0.4 (31.3)	4.2 (39.6)	10.5 (50.9)	16.1 (61.0)	20.0 (68.0)	21.7 (71.1)	20.9 (69.6)	15.7 (60.3)	9.8 (49.6)	4.4 (39.9)	−0.8 (30.6)	10.0 (50.0)
Mean daily minimum °C (°F)	−5.6 (21.9)	−4.1 (24.6)	−0.3 (31.5)	4.7 (40.5)	9.8 (49.6)	13.7 (56.7)	15.2 (59.4)	14.6 (58.3)	10.2 (50.4)	5.3 (41.5)	1.1 (34.0)	−4.5 (23.9)	5.0 (41.0)
Mean minimum °C (°F)	−16.7 (1.9)	−14.9 (5.2)	−8.4 (16.9)	−1.9 (28.6)	3.3 (37.9)	8.3 (46.9)	10.4 (50.7)	8.8 (47.8)	3.5 (38.3)	−2.7 (27.1)	−7.1 (19.2)	−14.1 (6.6)	−19.5 (−3.1)
Record low °C (°F)	−28.0 (−18.4)	−25.5 (−13.9)	−21.0 (−5.8)	−7.1 (19.2)	−1.2 (29.8)	5.5 (41.9)	7.5 (45.5)	5.4 (41.7)	−1.8 (28.8)	−7.4 (18.7)	−21.4 (−6.5)	−23.4 (−10.1)	−28.0 (−18.4)
Average precipitation mm (inches)	24.3 (0.96)	24.8 (0.98)	33.4 (1.31)	49.9 (1.96)	72.5 (2.85)	99.3 (3.91)	97.3 (3.83)	49.0 (1.93)	52.3 (2.06)	50.9 (2.00)	33.1 (1.30)	31.6 (1.24)	618.4 (24.33)
Average precipitation days (≥ 1.0 mm)	5.6	5.8	6.5	7.6	9.5	9.5	9.2	6.7	5.8	6.1	5.5	6.6	84.4
Mean monthly sunshine hours	64.4	88.5	138.5	180.3	235.5	246.4	275.3	261.1	183.2	133.8	71.4	52.4	1,930.8
Source 1: NOAA
Source 2: Infoclimat

== Politics ==
The local authority in the city is split between the Mayor and the Local Council. Between 1950 and 1968 the city was governed by the Sfatul popular (People's Council). It replaced the local Provisional Committee (Romanian: Comitetul Provizori), which functioned from 1948 to 1950, based on the Law of the People's Councils, no. 17/1949.

== Demographics ==
Historical population
Year	Pop.	±%
1859	8,972	—
1900	16,187	+80.4%
1912	18,846	+16.4%
1930	31,138	+65.2%
1941	38,965	+25.1%
1948	34,461	−11.6%
1956	54,138	+57.1%
1966	73,414	+35.6%
1977	127,299	+73.4%
1992	205,029	+61.1%
2002	175,500	−14.4%
2011	144,307	−17.8%
2021	136,087	−5.7%
Source: Census data, 1930–1948.

As of 2021 census data, Bacău has a population of 136,087, a decrease from the figure recorded at the 2011 census.

At the 2011 census, Bacău had a population of 144,307, a decrease from the figure recorded at the 2002 census. The ethnic makeup was as follows:

- Romanians: 97.93%
- Roma: 0.92%
- Hungarians: 0.09%
- Jews: 0.03%
- Other: 0.34%

The Bacău metropolitan area, a project for the creation of an administrative unit to integrate Bacău with the nearby communes, would have a population of some 190,000.

== Transportation ==
The city is about 300 kilometres (186 miles) North of Bucharest. It is served by George Enescu International Airport, located at 5 km (3.1 mi), which provides direct links with the Romanian capital, Bucharest, and with several cities in Europe. Bacău air traffic control centre is one of Europe's busiest, as it handles transiting flights between the Middle and Near East and South Asia to Europe and across the Atlantic.

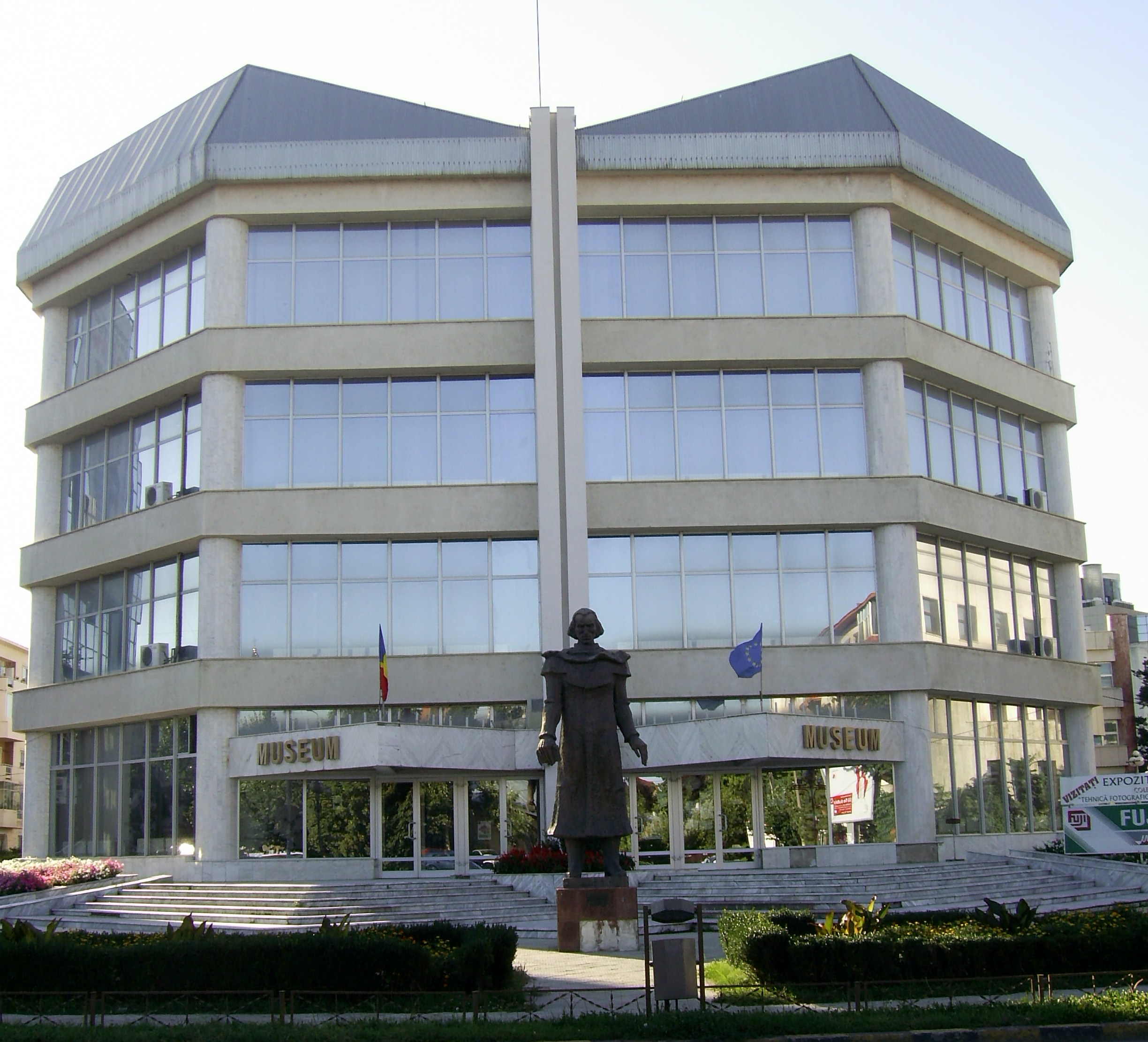
Museum Complex '"Iulian Antonescu"

The Bacău railway station (Gara Bacău) is one of the busiest in Romania; it has access to the Romanian railway main trunk number 500. Thus the city is connected to the main Romanian cities; the railway station is an important transit stop for international trains from Ukraine, Russia, and Bulgaria.

The city has access to the DN2 road (E85) that links it to the Romanian capital, Bucharest (to the South) and the cities of Suceava and Iași (to the North). The European route E574/DN11 is an important access road to Transylvania and the city of Brașov. The city is also located at the intersection of several national roads of secondary importance, and will be served in the future by the A7 motorway running from the border with Ukraine at Siret to Ploiești (junction with A3). As of 2020, this motorway intersects with the Bacău bypass (Centura Bacău).

== Culture ==
Bacău has a public university and several colleges. Two major Romanian poets, George Bacovia and Vasile Alecsandri were born here. The "Mihail Jora" Athenaeum and a Philharmonic Orchestra are located here, as well as the "G. Bacovia" Dramatic Theater and a Puppet Theater. Around Christmas every year, a Festival of Moldavian Winter Traditions takes place, reuniting folk artists from all the surrounding regions. The exhibition "Saloanele Moldovei" and the International Painting Camp at Tescani, near Bacău, reunite important plastic artists from Romania and from abroad. The local History Museum, part of the Museum Complex "Iulian Antonescu" has an important collection of antique objects from ancient Dacia. The city also has an astronomical observatory, The Victor Anestin Astronomical Observatory.

== Jewish community ==
A Jewish community was established in Bacău by the 18th century. A chevra kadisha (burial society) was founded in 1774, and in 1820 the city had 55 Jewish taxpaying heads of families. The community grew rapidly during the 19th century, reaching 3,810 people in 1859 and 7,902 in 1899, when Jews constituted 48.3% of Bacău's population.

Jewish religious, educational and charitable institutions developed alongside the community. A Talmud Torah was established in 1828, followed by a tailors' association in 1832, a mutual-aid society in 1836 and a Mishnah study society in 1851. The city's first Jewish elementary school was founded in 1863. During the late 19th century, Jews played a prominent role in Bacău's commercial and artisanal economy; in 1899, 563 of the city's commercial enterprises were Jewish-owned, while in 1901 there were 573 Jewish artisans. Bacău also became a centre of Hebrew printing.

By 1930, Bacău had 9,593 Jewish residents, representing 30.8% of the city's population, and just over half reported Yiddish as their mother tongue. The community maintained a kindergarten, separate primary schools for boys and girls, a hospital, an old-age home, an orphanage and a mikveh, as well as 25 synagogues. Bacău was also a centre of the Zionist movement. Among the city's prominent rabbis was Bezalel Ze'ev Șafran, who served in Bacău from 1905 until his death in 1929. A Hasidic centre operated at the synagogue on Leca Street.

Following the establishment of the National Legionary State and the rise of Ion Antonescu, Bacău's Jews were subjected to persecution and the confiscation of businesses and other property. After Romania entered World War II against the Soviet Union in June 1941, Jews from surrounding towns and villages were forcibly concentrated in Bacău, increasing the city's Jewish population to approximately 12,000. The community operated a kitchen that provided about 1,000 meals a day and gave financial assistance to approximately 1,000 families. Jewish men were sent to perform forced labour in Transylvania and Bessarabia, and in the spring of 1944 Jews in Bacău were compelled to dig defensive trenches as the front approached.

After Soviet forces entered the area in 1944 and local officials fled, members of the Jewish community temporarily assumed a number of municipal functions, including maintaining public order, operating the municipal hospital and paying municipal employees. Bacău's Jewish population reached approximately 18,000 in the immediate postwar period, but subsequently declined substantially as most of the community emigrated to Israel. By 2004, 359 Jews remained in the city.

The Jewish community has nevertheless continued to maintain an organized presence in Bacău. In December 2015, a new community headquarters was inaugurated at 2 Erou Costel Marius Hasan Street in a ceremony attended by Romanian Chief Rabbi Rafael Shaffer and Federation of the Jewish Communities of Romania president Aurel Vainer.

== International relations ==
=== Twin towns/Sister cities ===
Bacău is twinned with:

- Petah Tikva, Israel.
- Turin, Italy
- Mandaue, Philippines
- Caxias do Sul, Brazil (since 2017, after relationships between its citizens have developed exponentially)

== Sports ==
Athletics

- SCM Bacău
- CS Știința Bacău
- CSȘ Bacău

Badminton

- CS Știința Bacău
- CSȘ Bacău

Basketball

- CSȘ Bacău

Boxing

- SCM Bacău

Bridge

- Bridge Club Bacău

Football

- FCM Bacău
- CS Aerostar Bacău
- CS FC Pambac Bacău
- FC Willy Bacău
- AS Clipa VIO Bacău
- Siretul Bacău
- LPS Bacău
- FC Bacău
- CSM Bacău

Gymnastics

- SCM Bacău
- CS Știința Bacău

Team Handball

- C.S. Știința Municipal Dedeman Bacău
- CS Știința Bacău
- CSȘ Bacău
- CSM Bacău

Judo

- SCM Bacău
- Judo Club Royal Bacău

Karate

- SCM Bacău
- CS Știința Bacău
- CS Seishin Karate-Do Bacău
- Siretul Bacău
- Sfinx Club Karate-Do Bacau

Fights

- SCM Bacău

Modelism

- SCM Bacău
- CS Aerostar Bacău

Swimming

- SCM Bacău (înot, sărituri în apă)
- LPS Bacău (înot)

Tennis

- SCM Bacău
- ASTC Bistrița Bacău
- CSȘ Bacău

== People ==
- Aaron Aaronsohn, agronomist, botanist, and Zionist activist
- Vasile Alecsandri, poet
- Angela Alupei, rower
- George Apostu, sculptor
- Constantin Avram, academician
- Radu Beligan, actor, poet, essayist
- George Bacovia, poet
- Dragoș Benea, politician
- Dimitrie Berea, painter
- Julius Borcea, mathematician
- Andrei Burcă, footballer
- Constantin Cândea, chemist
- Vlad Chiricheș, footballer
- Radu Cosașu, writer and activist
- Sile Dinicu, composer and conductor
- Ion Drăgoi, violinist
- Nicu Enea, painter
- Gabriela Firea, journalist and politician, mayor of Bucharest
- Mariana Zavati Gardner, poet
- Paul Grigoriu, journalist
- Nicolae Gropeanu, painter
- Iulius Iancu, Jewish poet and writer
- David Korner, communist militant, syndicalist, and journalist
- Radu Lecca, double spy, journalist, fascist, antisemite, declared a war criminal by the communists
- Narcisa Lecușanu, handball player
- Solomon Marcus, mathematician
- Ioan Măric, artist
- Agnès Matoko, model
- Dumitru Mazilu, politician
- Doina Melinte, athlete, Olympic gold medalist
- Mihaela Melinte, athlete
- Marius Mircu, journalist and memoirist
- Cornel Palade, humorist and TV host
- Costel Pantilimon, footballer
- Lucrețiu Pătrășcanu, Marxist intellectual and politician
- Vasile Pârvan, istoric, archaeologist, and academician
- Gabriela Potorac, gymnast
- Gheorghe Rădoi, communist politician
- Monica Roșu, gymnast
- Mirela Rusu, double world champion in aerobic gymnastics
- Alexandru Șafran, Rabbi and senator
- Doru Sechelariu, racing driver
- Gianina Șerban, politician
- Olga Tudorache, theater and film actress, university professor
- Petru Răzvan Umbrărescu, racing driver
- Anamaria Vartolomei, actress
- Nicolae Vermont, painter
- Max Yankowitz, accordionist

== Gallery ==
Winter Festival

"Precista", detail

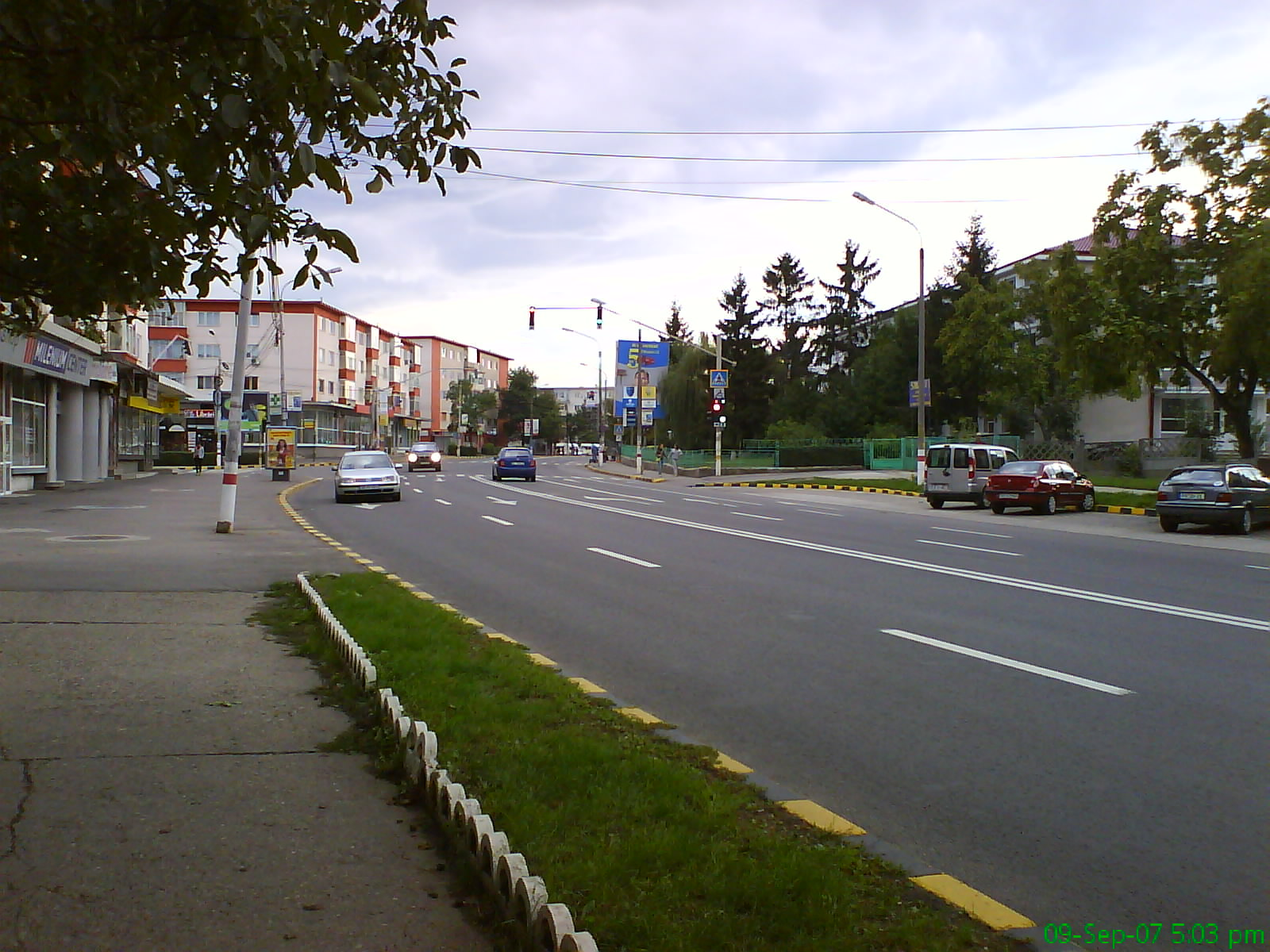
"9th of May" Street

== See also ==
- Bacău metropolitan area

== Sources ==
- Benda, Kálmán (2002). The Hungarians of Moldavia (Csángós) in the 16th–17th Centuries. In: Diószegi, László (2002); Hungarian Csángós in Moldavia: Essays on the Past and Present of the Hungarian Csángós in Moldavia; Teleki László Foundation - Pro Minoritate Foundation; ISBN 963-85774-4-4.
- Dobre, Claudia Florentina (2009). Mendicants in Moldavia: Mission in an Orthodox Land. AUREL Verlag. ISBN 978-3-938759-12-7.
- Pozsony, Ferenc (2002). Church Life in Moldavian Hungarian Communities. In: Diószegi, László (2002); Hungarian Csángós in Moldavia: Essays on the Past and Present of the Hungarian Csángós in Moldavia; Teleki László Foundation - Pro Minoritate Foundation; ISBN 963-85774-4-4.
- Rădvan, Laurențiu (2010). At Europe's Borders: Medieval Towns in the Romanian Principalities. BRILL. ISBN 978-90-04-18010-9.
- Spinei, Victor (2009). The Romanians and the Turkic Nomads North of the Danube Delta from the Tenth to the Mid-Thirteenth century. Koninklijke Brill NV. ISBN 978-90-04-17536-5.
- Treptow, Kurt W.; Popa, Marcel (1996). Historical Dictionary of Romania. The Scarecrow Press. ISBN 0-8108-3179-1.
