= Nicolae Gropeanu =

Romanian painter and illustrator

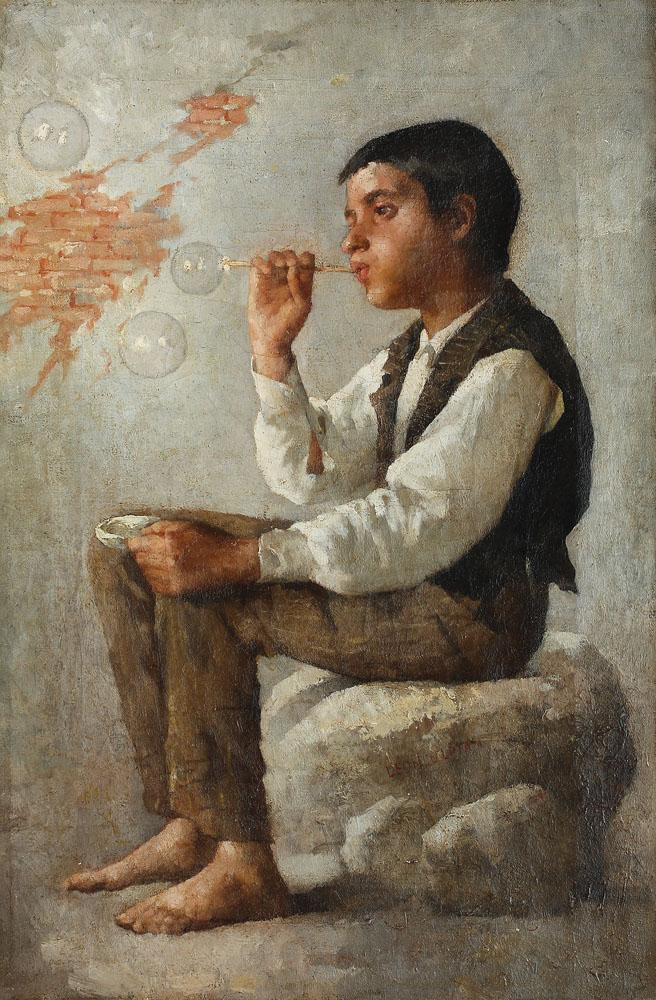
Bubbles

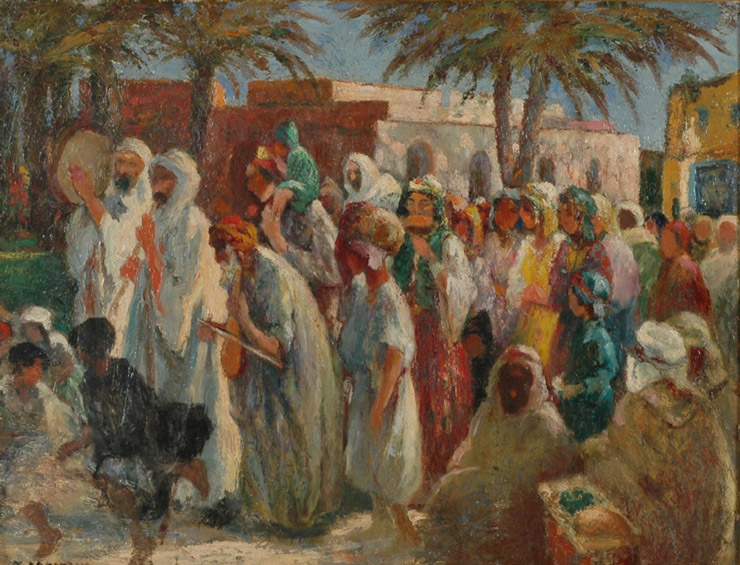
Procession in Palestine

Nicolae Orval Gropeanu or, in French, Nicolas Gropeano (28 November 1863 in Bacău – 6 January 1936 in Paris) was a Romanian painter, pastelist and illustrator; probably of Jewish ancestry. He is known primarily for genre scenes, portraits and figures. Other variations on his name as it appears in official documents include Nicolae Gropper, Naia Groper and Noah Gropper.

== Biography ==
He studied with Theodor Aman and Constantin Stăncescu, who was better known as an art critic. According to Jacques Doucet, a noted art collector, Gropeanu's debut at the Salon was very successful and the critics praised him as one of the best young Romanian painters. They were especially impressed with his pastels of children's portraits and oriental scenes.

For many years, he provided drawings to Le Figaro Illustré and later created illustrations for the stories of Elena Văcărescu.

Although he remained in Paris, he participated in exhibitions at home, notably at the "Societatea Ileana", an artists' association founded by Nicolae Vermont and Ștefan Luchian, and two solo exhibitions at the Romanian Athenaeum in 1909 and 1912. In 1935, he was named a Knight in the Legion of Honour.

Several of his works were purchased by the French government. The existence of numerous Orientalist works would suggest that he travelled through North Africa and the Middle East at some unknown date.
