= Maria Cândea =

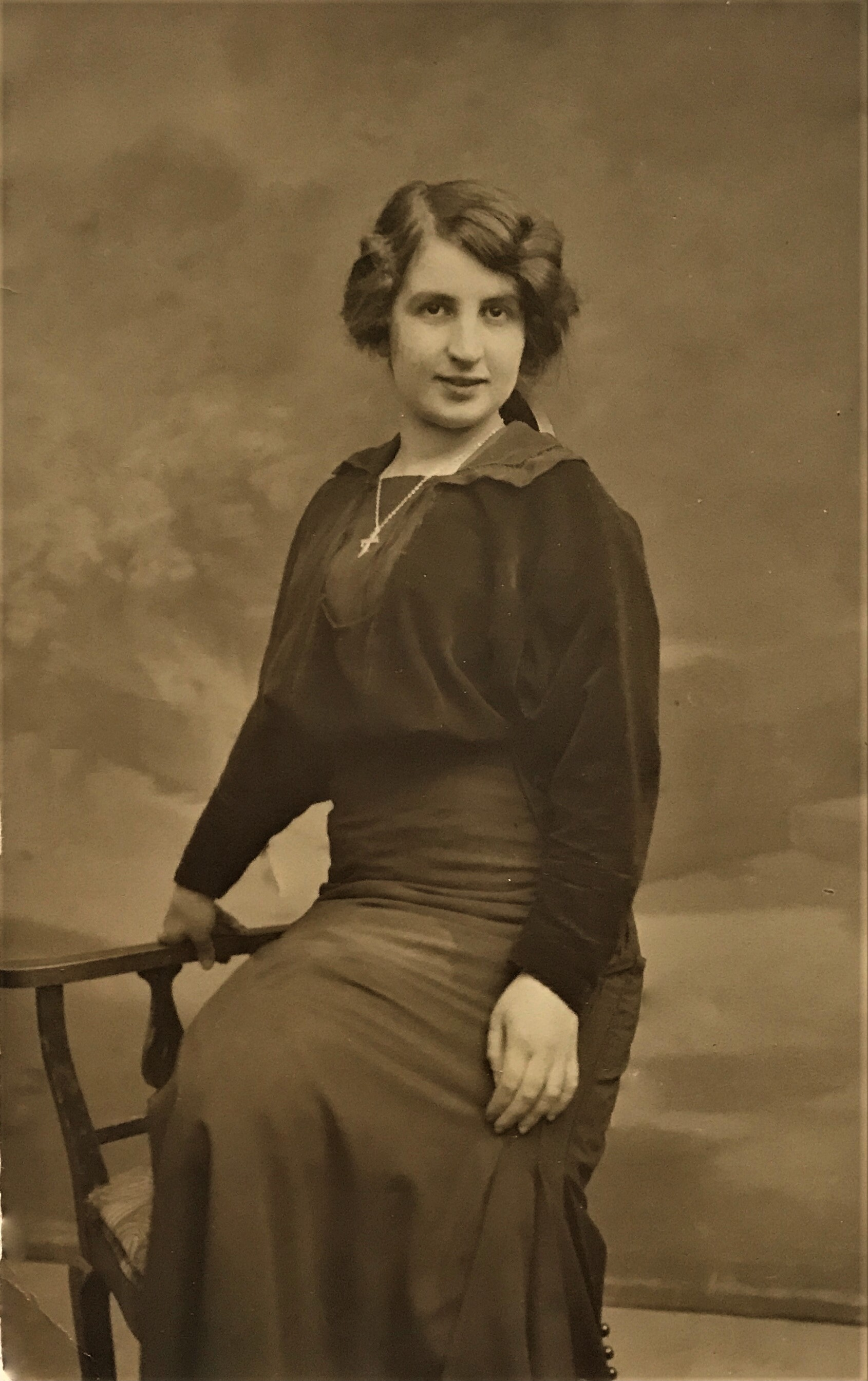
- Maria Cândea
- Born: Maria Antoniade; October 2, 1889; Galați, Kingdom of Romania
- Died: April 16, 1974 (aged 84); Bucharest, Socialist Republic of Romania
- Resting place: Bellu Cemetery (Figure 4), Bucharest; 44.40381°N 26.099685°E
- Education: Sorbonne
- Employer(s): Queen Marie Normal School for Girls, Ploiești
- Spouse: Constantin Cândea (1923)

Maria Cândea (Romanian pronunciation: [marja ˈkɨnde̯a]; October 2, 1889 – April 16, 1974) was a Romanian French language and literature teacher, Doctor of Letters from the University of Paris (Sorbonne), who founded and led as School director the Queen Marie Normal School for Girls in Ploiești.

== Biography ==
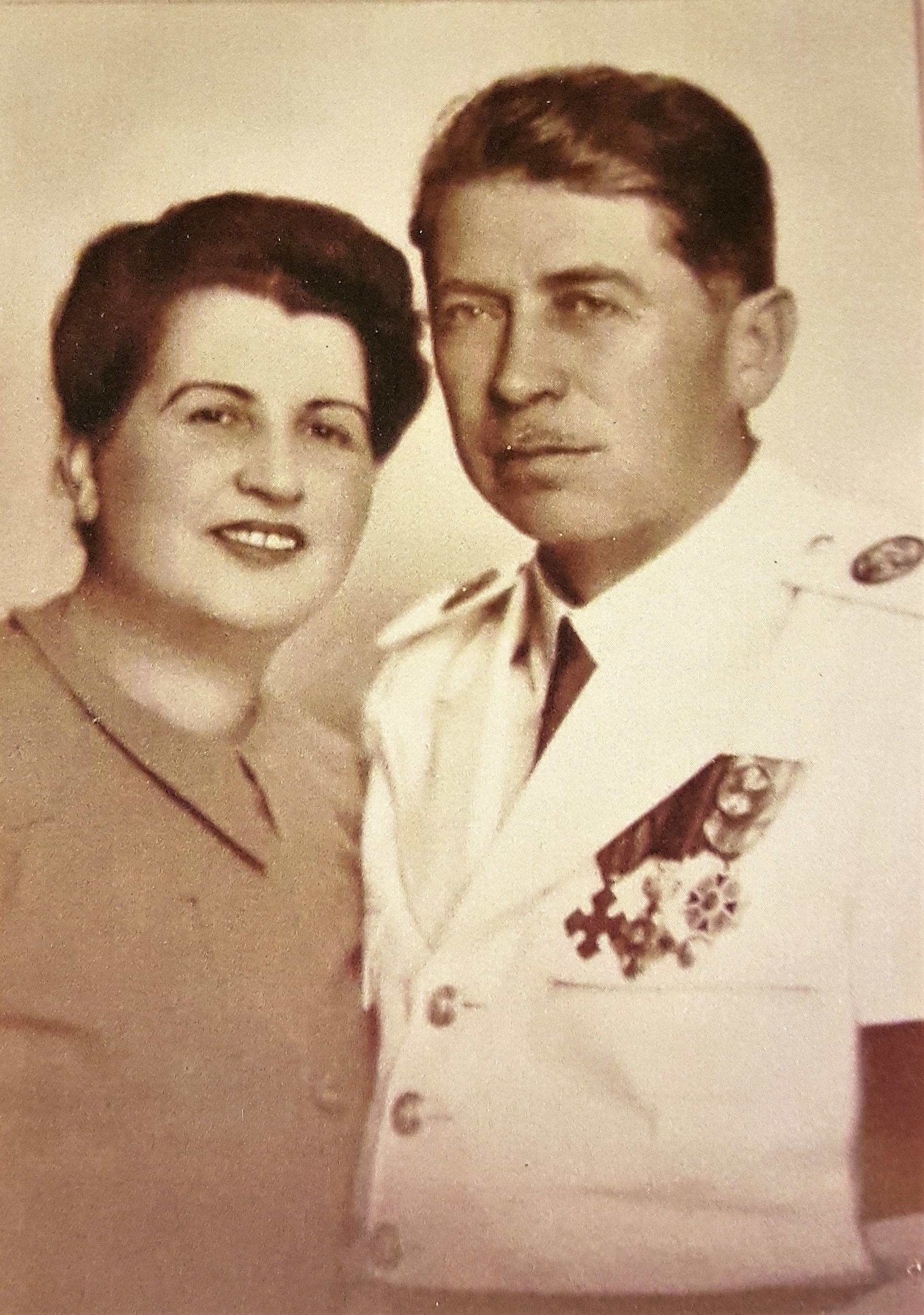
Constantin Cândea and Maria (Antoniade) Cândea

Maria Cândea (née Antoniade) was born on October 2, 1889, in Galați.

On September 27, 1923, she married Constantin Cândea (born December 15, 1887, Mărgineni, Bacău County – died March 4, 1971, Bucharest), a university professor, Doctor Docent, habilitatus engineer in chemistry, rector of Politehnica University of Timișoara, member of Parliament, and member of the Romanian Academy of Sciences.

Their marriage resulted in two children: Mioara-Rodica Cândea, married Georgescu, an architect (born July 9, 1924, Ploiești – died September 13, 2017, Montreal) and Ioan-Radu Cândea, a civil engineer (born September 24, 1925, Ploiești – died February 11, 2016, Bucharest).

Maria Cândea passed away on April 16, 1974, in Bucharest at the age of 84. She is buried at Bellu Cemetery, Plot 4.

== Education and early career ==
Maria Cândea (then Maria Antoniade) graduated from the "Vasile Alecsandri" High School in Galați, modern section, where her philosophy teacher was Florian Ștefănescu-Goangă.

Between 1910 and 1914, she attended the Faculty of Letters and Philosophy of the University of Bucharest, specializing in Romance philology, and obtained her Bachelor's degree in 1914. In the 1912–1913 academic year, she was a third-year student, and beginning January 1, 1914, she received a scholarship from the "Carol I" University Foundation, together with her sister, Aspasia Antoniade, who was enrolled in the same year and at the same faculty.

During her studies at the Faculty of Letters of the University of Bucharest, Maria Antoniade attended the lectures of prominent figures of Romanian culture and science, including Ovid Densusianu, professor of Romance philology, Ion Bianu, Nicolae Iorga, Simion Mehedinți, Dimitrie Onciul, Vasile Pârvan, Constantin Rădulescu-Motru, Eugen Lovinescu, Iuliu Valaori, Dumitru Evolceanu, Pompiliu Eliade, and Constantin Giurescu.

She corresponded with the philologist Ovid Densusianu, one of her professors; her letters were published in the volume Scrisori către Ovid Densușianu (Letters to Ovid Densușianu), vol. I (Minerva Publishing house, Bucharest, 1979).

Beginning May 1, 1911, she was appointed to the central administration of the Ministry of Domains as a typist in the Architecture Office. On April 1, 1912, she was transferred within the same ministry to the Directorate of Agriculture, in the Secretariat Office. She carried out this work in parallel with her university studies.

Her academic training thus took place in a high-level intellectual environment, during the formative period of the modern Romanian schools of philology, history, philosophy, and the humanities.

Between 1914 and 1916, she continued her academic training in France, obtaining her doctorate in Letters from the University of Paris (Sorbonne).

In 1916, she passed the qualifying examinations in Romanian language, French language, Latin, and philosophy, thereby earning the right to teach at the secondary-school level.

== Activity within the Red Cross (1916–1918) ==
During World War I, Maria Cândea (then Maria Antoniade) carried out volunteer work with the Romanian Red Cross, serving at the "Queen Elisabeth Polyclinic" Hospital in Bucharest, an institution located in the building that today houses the Foișor Orthopedics Hospital. There, she was involved in caring for wounded soldiers, contributing to medical assistance activities and providing moral support to hospitalized servicemen.

Her sisters, Aspasia Antoniade and Elena M. Antoniade, were also involved in this work, their names being mentioned in the press of the time among the ladies and young women who cared for the wounded. Their dedication and concern for the hospitalized soldiers were publicly acknowledged: in a note published in the press, soldiers who had been treated in one of the hospital wards expressed their gratitude by name to Miss Maria Antoniade and the other volunteers, thanking them for the care they had received, “which they would never forget for the rest of their lives.”

Her involvement in these activities reflects not only the civic spirit of the Antoniade family, but also her upbringing in an intellectual environment in which duty to the community was considered an integral part of education. The experience she gained during the war – organization, discipline, teamwork, and assuming responsibility in critical situations – contributed to shaping her later profile as an educator and organizer of school institutions.

== Teaching and Leadership Activity ==
On November 10, 1918, Maria (Antoniade) Cândea founded and served as principal of the Girls’ Preparatory School for Teachers in Gherghița. In 1919, this institution was transformed into the Girls’ Normal School "Queen Maria," and in 1920 it was moved to Ploiești, still under her leadership, to the building where it continues to operate today as the National Pedagogical College Regina Maria.

Maria (Antoniade) Cândea served as principal of the Girls’ Normal School "Queen Maria" from its founding in 1918 until the autumn of 1931, being reconfirmed in this position twice: beginning in March 1926 by Royal Decree no. 607 of February 15, 1926, published in the Official Gazette no. 64 of March 18, 1926 and beginning April 1, 1931, by Royal Decree no. 819 of March 20, 1931, published in the Official Gazette no. 75 of March 31, 1931.

Because her husband, Professor Dr. Eng. Constantin Cândea, was a university professor at the Politehnica University of Timișoara, Maria Cândea transferred, effective September 1, 1931, from the Girls’ Normal School in Ploiești (French Department) to the Boys’ Normal School in Timișoara – today the Jean Louis Calderon Theoretical High School – to Chair no. 2 of Romanian and Latin, by Decision of the Minister of Instruction, Religious Affairs and Arts no. 124,695 of August 26, 1931, published in the Official Gazette no. 227 of September 29, 1931.

According to Decision of the Minister of National Education no. 116,907 of July 2, 1939, published in the Official Gazette no. 152 of July 5, 1939, Maria Cândea, then a teacher at the Boys’ Normal School in Timișoara, was appointed, effective September 1, 1939, to Chair no. 3 of Romanian Language at the Girls’ High School "Carmen Sylva" in Timișoara.

== Activity in Ploiești (1919–1931) ==
Maria Cândea carried out extensive teaching, administrative, and cultural activity in Ploiești as headmistress of the Girls’ Normal School "Regina Maria.”

On November 16, 1920, the Girls’ Normal School in Ploiești was inaugurated in a solemn ceremony. The event took place in the presence of local authorities and the public, following a religious service, and the principal of the institution, Miss Maria Antoniade, delivered an official speech. On this occasion, a fundraising collection was also organized, the funds being intended for the material improvements needed by the school.

As happened every year, in July 1926, in her capacity as headmistress, she took part in the end-of-year celebration of the Girls’ Normal School "Regina Maria" in Ploiești, a public event dedicated to presenting the pupils’ educational and artistic activities.

As part of the events marking the 10th anniversary of the Union of Bessarabia, organized in Ploiești on May 4, 1928, Maria Cândea participated alongside Professor Dr. Constantin Cândea.

Under her leadership, on May 6, 1928, the Girls’ Normal School of Ploiești organized in the commune of Teișani, Prahova County, a large cultural and educational event that included a teachers’ cultural circle, pedagogical presentations, and a popular celebration with the participation of pupils, local authorities, and a large audience from neighboring villages.

On the occasion of the International Congress of Thalassotherapy held in Ploiești on May 15, 1928, the pupils of the Girls’ Normal School presented an artistic program in the hall of the National Houses, consisting of musical moments and national dances, the event being organized under the coordination of the institution she led.

In June 1928, Maria Cândea was among the members of the organizing committee for the public festivities held on Independence Boulevard in Ploiești, aimed at raising funds for the construction of an aerodrome near the city.

As part of the celebration of 10 years since the Union with Transylvania, a school gathering took place on December 1, 1928, at the Girls’ Normal School in Ploiești, and on December 23, 1928, the Christmas Tree celebration was held, during which Maria Cândea delivered a speech and gifts were offered to pupils from modest families.

In April 1929, she was elected a member of the committee of the "Cultul Patriei" Society, in her capacity as principal of the Girls’ Normal School in Ploiești.

In the context of the inauguration of the rural library of 1,300 volumes in the commune of Măneciu, Prahova County, on June 9, 1929, Maria Cândea participated in the cultural event organized by the School Inspectorate of Region VIII Bucharest, alongside representatives of the educational and local authorities, delivering a speech on this occasion.

The jubilee marking 10 years since the founding of the Girls’ Normal School "Regina Maria" was celebrated on July 6, 1929, through a festive ceremony opened by Maria Cândea with an extensive address, in which she presented the history of the institution, established in 1919 in the manor of His Majesty King Ferdinand I of Romania on the Romanian Crown Estate in the commune of Gherghița, Prahova County, as well as the difficulties encountered and the progress achieved during its first decade of existence.

In the autumn of 1930, Maria Cândea took part in the official reception of Abbot Metodiu Zavoral in Ploiești, an event of cultural and ceremonial character. Also in 1930, she attended the festivities marking the oath-taking of the Girl Scouts of Ploiești, an educational and civic event dedicated to youth.

In the summer of 1931, Maria Cândea participated in the celebration of Professor Dumitru Munteanu-Râmnic, organized as a public banquet in Ploiești, attended by numerous local personalities.

Her public activity in Prahova County concluded in August 1931, when she attended the solemn laying of the foundation stone for the new school building in the village of Cheia, Prahova County, an official and educational event.

On September 1, 1931, Maria Cândea ended her activity at the Girls’ Normal School in Ploiești, transferring to Timișoara, where her husband was working. The leadership of the institution was taken over by the mathematics teacher Florica Dascălu, initially entrusted with the interim management as of September 5, and subsequently appointed headmistress beginning November 1, 1931.

Her teaching activity took place in Ploiești and later in Timișoara, where her husband was also professionally active, their move to Bucharest occurred only after her retirement.

== Activity in Timișoara (1931–1949) ==
In 1931, Maria Cândea moved from Ploiești to Timișoara, where her husband, Dr. Eng. Constantin Cândea, was a university professor at the Polytechnic School.

In 1933, on the occasion of the Congress of the National Society of Chemistry held in Timișoara, the reception for participants at the Military Casino was organized by the Ladies’ Society of Timișoara under the leadership of Maria Cândea, who coordinated the entire event. Her husband was President of the Chemistry Society, Timișoara Section, and chairman of the congress organizing committee.

Between 1931 and 1949, she was a member of teachers’ tenure exam committees and baccalaureate committees, as a teacher of Romanian and French. She taught at the Boys’ Normal School in Timișoara until 1939 and subsequently at the Girls’ High School "Carmen Sylva" in Timișoara until her retirement in 1949.

On June 7, 1937, she was a member of the examination board for the teachers’ tenure exam in the Bucharest center, the board continued the oral examinations and other stages of the exam on October 15, 1937.

In December 1939, as a member of the ladies’ committee of the Patronage Society of Timișoara, Maria Cândea was involved in organizing a donation drive for the minors at the Re-education Institute. Subscription lists were drawn up to collect funds and necessary goods, and she took part in the meeting at which the Christmas Tree celebration was organized, featuring an artistic-musical program and charitable fundraising activities for these children.

During her teaching activity at the Girls’ High School "Carmen Sylva" in Timișoara, Maria Cândea coordinated various school artistic programs, including a literary-artistic gathering commemorating Ion Luca Caragiale in 1943 at the "Darul Ostașului" Hospital, where the pupils performed a play and offered 30 kilograms of apples to the wounded, as well as a celebration organized at the beginning of 1944 on the occasion of the holidays.

On March 10, 1943, Maria Cândea attended a lecture delivered by Maria Kasterska Sergescu at the French Institute in Timișoara, dedicated to the French writer Henry de Montherlant, alongside other teachers from the city.

In March 1943, she participated, as a teacher, in a meeting of the "Literary Group" of the Theoretical Girls’ Gymnasium of Timișoara, a cultural-educational event held within the framework of the School Youth Education Organization.

In 1943, she was a member of the "Association of Romanian Orthodox Women of Timișoara (Cetate district)," an organization involved in social, educational, and charitable support activities, such as assisting the army, soldiers’ families, and school institutions. In this capacity, she took part in fundraising events, including charitable teas, and in the Association's general assembly, where activity reports were presented and decisions were adopted regarding the organization's social initiatives.

On March 30, 1944, she is recorded as having participated in a committee meeting of the "Darul Ostașului" organization, held at the "Notre Dame" Hospital in Timișoara. The organization aimed to support soldiers and war wounded through public collections, donations, and cultural events. Within this activity, Maria Cândea was a member of the committee that reviewed the results of artistic festivals organized to raise funds for the aid of the army and military hospitals.

She continued her teaching work in Timișoara until 1949, the year of her retirement, after which she settled with her family in Bucharest.

== Affiliations ==
In addition to her educational and administrative career, Maria Cândea was involved in several cultural, educational, and philanthropic organizations.

In April 1929, while serving as principal of the Regina Maria Girls' Normal School in Ploiești, she was elected to the governing committee of the society Cultul Patriei ("The Cult of the Fatherland"), an organization dedicated to the promotion of national values and cultural activities.

After settling in Timișoara, she became active within the Societatea de Patronaj (Patronage Society) and was mentioned in 1939 as a member of the organization's ladies' committee. In this capacity, she participated in social welfare and charitable activities aimed at minors housed in re-education institutions and other vulnerable groups.

In 1943, she was a member of the Reuniunea Femeilor Române Ortodoxe din Timișoara (cartierul Cetate) (Association of Orthodox Romanian Women of Timișoara, Cetate district), an organization engaged in social, educational, and charitable activities, including support for the military, soldiers' families, and educational institutions.

In 1944, Maria Cândea served on the committee of the Darul Ostașului ("The Soldier's Gift") organization in Timișoara. The organization supported soldiers and war-wounded servicemen through public collections, donations, and cultural events. In this role, she participated in the evaluation and coordination of fundraising initiatives intended to assist the army and military hospitals.

Between 1931 and 1949, she was repeatedly appointed as a member of teacher certification and baccalaureate examination boards in Timișoara and other localities. In this capacity, she took part in the assessment and examination of teachers and secondary-school students.

Preceded by —	Principal of the National Pedagogical College „Regina Maria” Ploiești; 1918–1931	Succeeded by Florica Dascălu
