= Bacău railway station =

Bacău
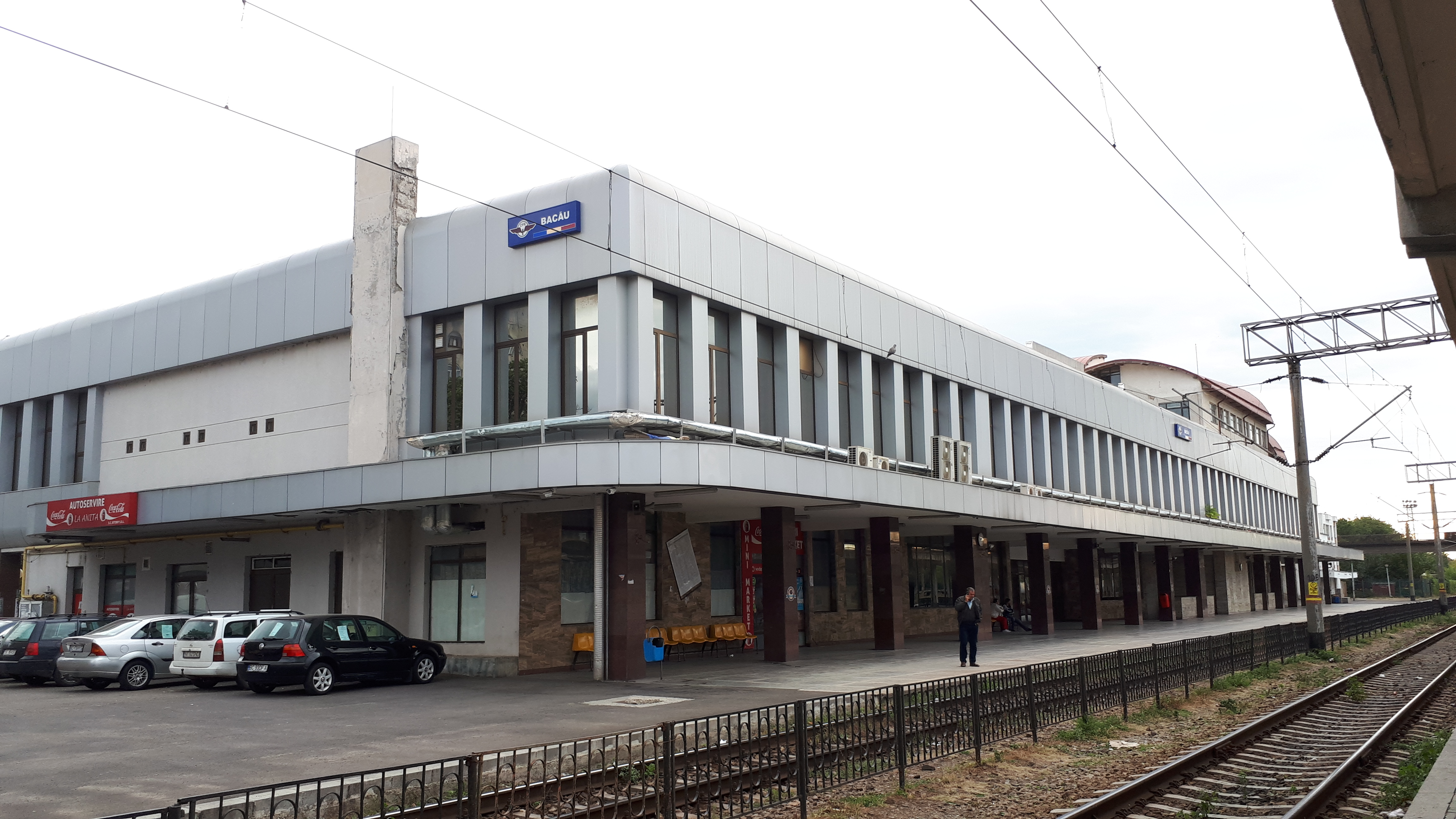

General information
- Location: Strada Gării 3, Bacău, Romania
- Coordinates: 46°33′56″N 26°53′43″E
- Owner: CFR
- Line: 5
- Platforms: 3
- Tracks: 3

Construction
- Parking: yes

History
- Opened: 1872
- Rebuilt: 1983
- Electrified: 28 May 1978
Location

Bacău railway station (Romanian: Gara Bacău) is the largest train station in the city of Bacău, Romania, and one of the most important in the north-east of the country.
