= Ioan Borcea =

Romanian zoologist (1879–1936)

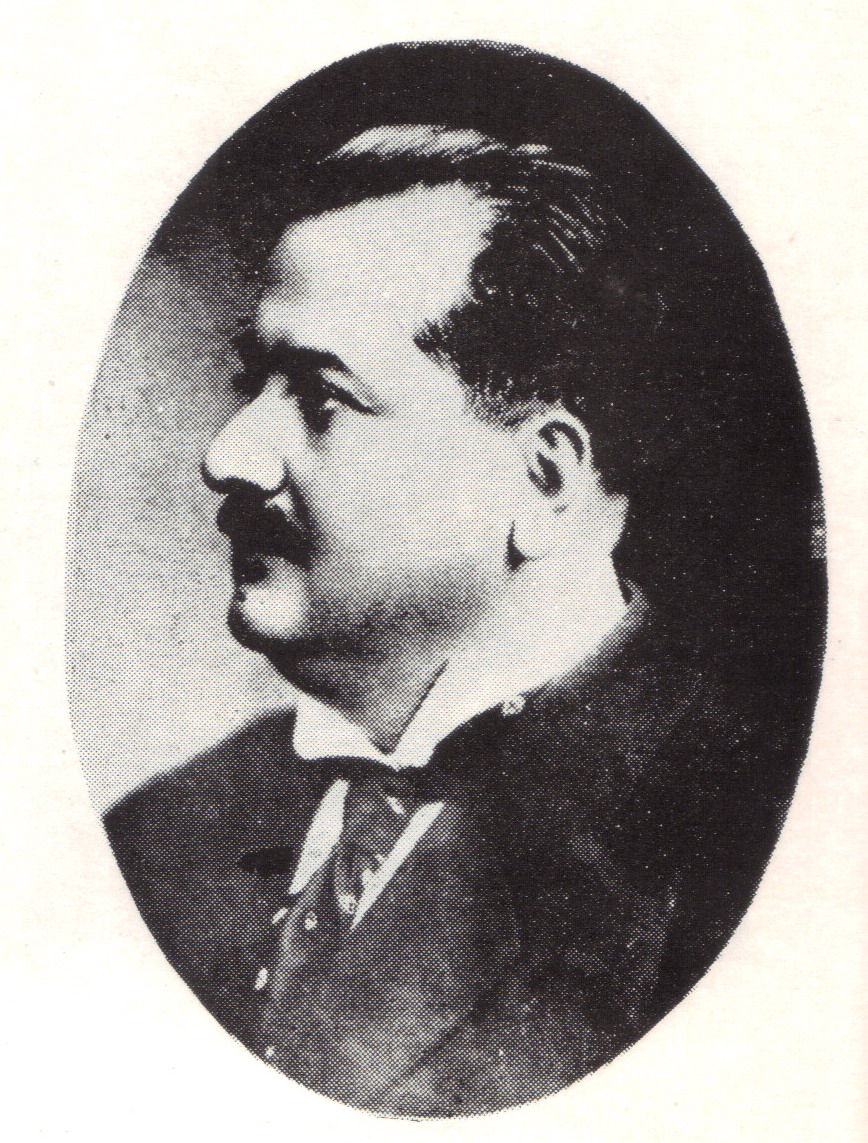
Romanian biologist Ioan Borcea

Ioan Borcea (January 30, 1879–July 30, 1936) was a Romanian zoologist. Born in Buhoci, Bacău County, he entered secondary school at the National College in Iași before going on to the Costache Negruzzi Boarding High School, from which he graduated in 1897. He then entered the natural sciences section of Iași University's sciences faculty, graduating in 1900. Initially a teaching assistant in the animal morphology department, Borcea received a scholarship to study in France the following year. In 1903, he obtained an undergraduate degree from the natural sciences faculty of the Sorbonne. In 1905, the same institution awarded him a doctorate; his thesis dealt with the genitourinary system of the Elasmobranchii. He performed research at the marine biology stations in the French villages of Banyuls-sur-Mer and Roscoff, as well as in Naples.

In 1909, Borcea became a professor at the Iași sciences faculty, at one point serving as dean remaining until his death. In 1926, he founded the Agigea Marine Biology Station, located on the Black Sea coast near Constanța, and served as its director for the last decade of his life. From 1919 to 1920, he served as Minister of Religious Affairs and Public Instruction in the government of Alexandru Vaida-Voevod. From 1912 to 1936, he directed the Iași Natural History Museum. In 1909, he became a member of the National Museum of Natural History in Paris, obtaining a similar position with the American Museum of Natural History in New York City in 1935. He was an honorary member of the Société zoologique de France, and edited the V. Adamachi Scientific Magazine. In 1919, he was elected a corresponding member of the Romanian Academy.

Borcea published over a hundred scientific works on theoretical and applied entomology, oceanography, museology, Black Sea fauna and the relicts of the Black and Caspian seas as well as the Lake Razelm area. He introduced the concept of biologically countering agricultural pests in Romania. He died at Agigea. The Ion Borcea Technical College, located in Buhuși, close to Borcea's birthplace, was named after him in 1990. Additionally, the Constanța Aquarium bears his name.
