= Bacău metropolitan area =

- Metropolitan area
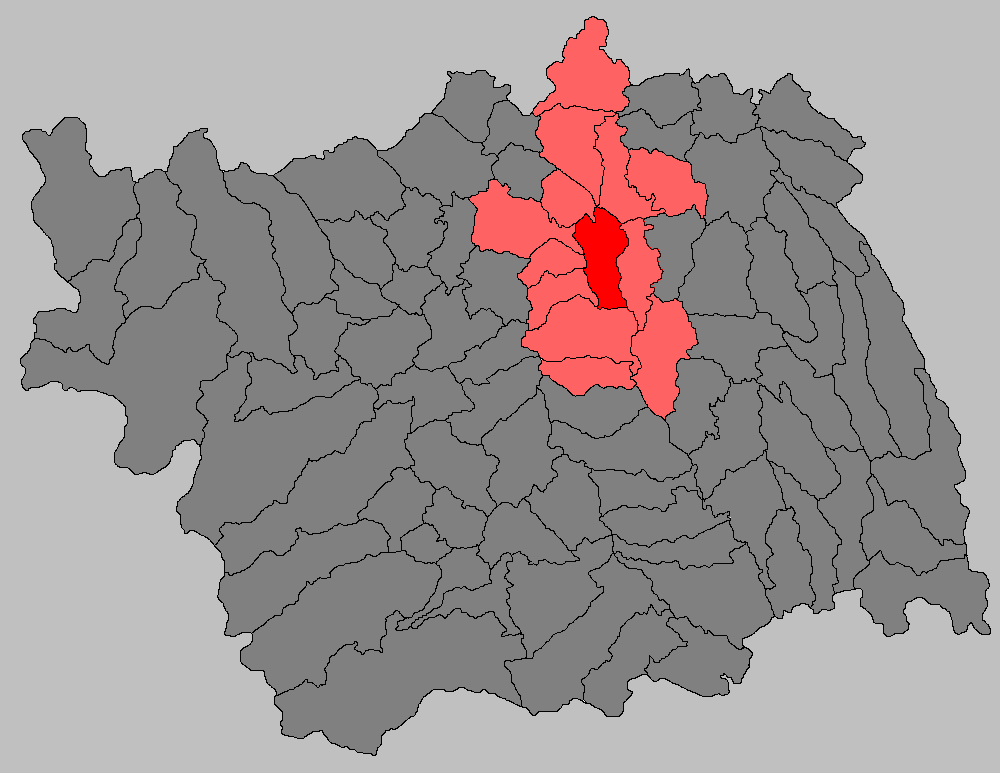
- Country: Romania
- County: Bacău
- Central Municipality: Bacău
- Functional: proposed

Area
  - Total: 700.47 km^{2} (270.45 sq mi)

Population (2011 census)
  - Total: 188,709
  - Density: 269/km^{2} (700/sq mi)
- Time zone: UTC+2 (EET)
  - Summer (DST): UTC+3 (EEST)
- Postal Code: 60wxyz^{1}
- Area code: +40 x34^{2}
- ^{1}w, x, y, and z are digits that indicate the street, part of the street, or even the building of the address^{2}x is a digit indicating the operator: 2 for the former national operator, Romtelecom, and 3 for the other ground telephone networks

The Bacău metropolitan area is a proposed metropolitan area project that includes the urban area of Bacău. It includes the communes of Letea Veche, Buhoci, Luizi-Călugăra, Săucești, Hemeiuș, Gârleni, Racova, Mărgineni, Măgura and others, and would extend to the town of Buhuși. If completed, the metropolitan would have an estimated population of 188,709 (as per 2011 census).

According to Eurostat, in 2007 Bacău had a larger urban zone of 196,435 residents, on an area of 102 km^{2}. As of 2015, the Bacău functional urban area has a population of 224,745 residents.
