= Constanța Aquarium =

Aquarium in Constanța, Romania

Coordinates: 44°10′15″N 28°39′47″E

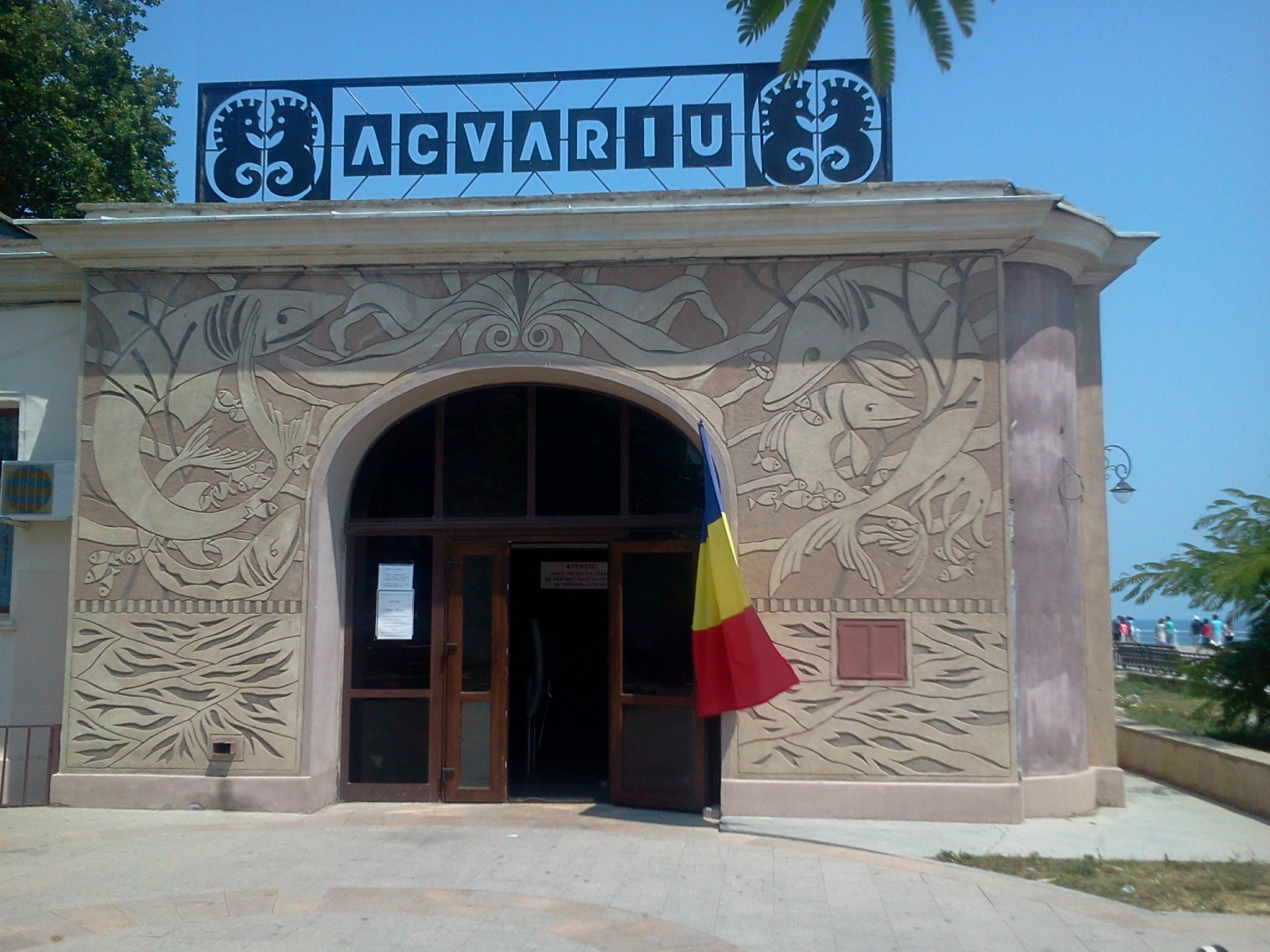
Constanța Aquarium

The Constanța Aquarium is located along the Black Sea in Constanța, Romania.

The building that hosts the aquarium dates to the early 20th century. It served as a restaurant for the adjacent Constanța Casino until the aquarium opened in 1958. For many years Romania’s only aquarium, it holds over 100 species of fish and other aquatic wildlife. These are divided into three sections: marine, freshwater and exotic fish.

The aquarium is named after marine biologist Ioan Borcea.
