= Constantin Cândea =

Romanian chemist

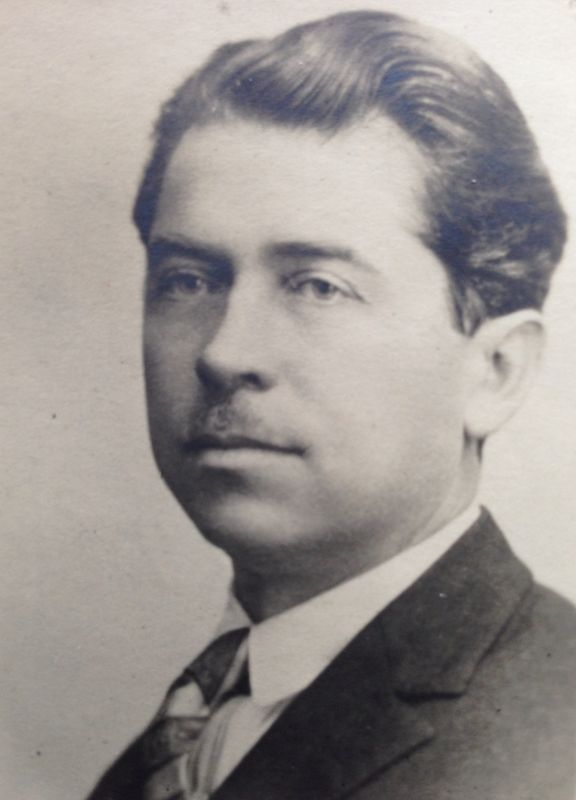
- Constantin Cândea in 1940
- Born: December 15, 1887; Mărgineni, Bacău, Kingdom of Romania
- Died: March 4, 1971 (aged 83); Bucharest, Socialist Republic of Romania
- Resting place: Bellu Cemetery (Figure 4), Bucharest; 44.40381°N 26.099685°E
- Education: Königlich Bayerische Technische Hochschule München
- Known for: Founder of the Chemistry Laboratories at the Polytechnic University of Timișoara (1921, 1922); Rector of the Polytechnic University of Timișoara 1946–1947; member of the Romanian Academy of Sciences; deputy (Member of Parilament)
- Spouse(s): Maria Cândea, née Antoniade
- Awards: Order of the Star of Romania; Order of the Crown of Romania; Commemorative Cross of the War 1916–1918; Order of Labor (Romania) 3rd class
- Scientific career
- Fields: Chemistry, Petrochemistry
- Workplaces: Polytechnic University of Timișoara

Constantin Cândea (Romanian pronunciation: [konstanˈtiŋ ˈkɨnde̯a]; December 15, 1887 – March 4, 1971) was a Romanian chemist, professor, Doctor Docent, Engineer with habilitation in Chemistry, and Rector of the Politehnica University of Timișoara (then the Polytechnic School of Timișoara) between 1946 and 1947. He founded the chemistry laboratories of the Polytechnic School of Timișoara, served as a deputy, and was a member of the Romanian Academy of Sciences.

== Biography ==
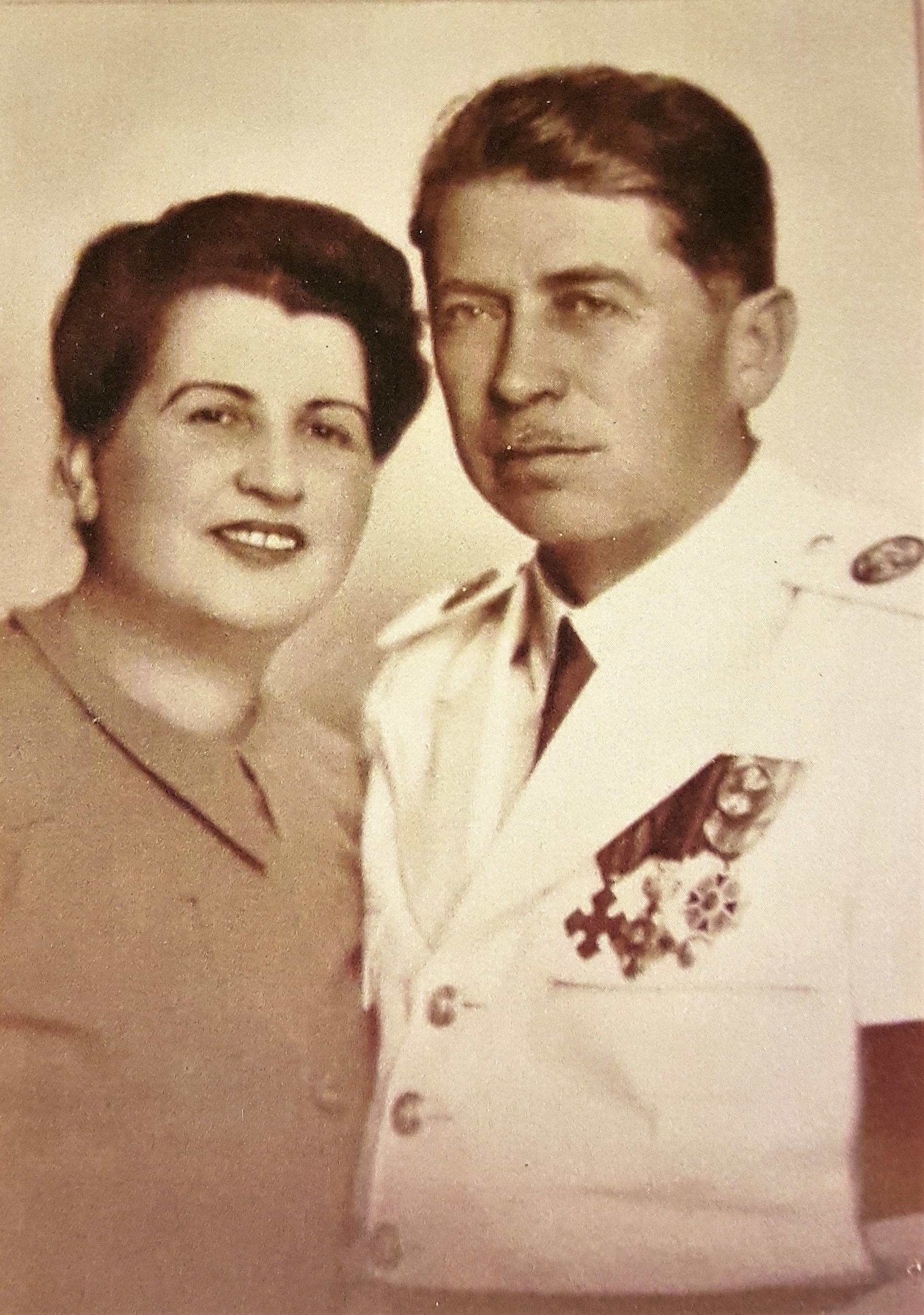
Constantin Cândea and Maria Cândea née Antoniade

Constantin Cândea was born on December 15, 1887, in the commune of Mărgineni, Bacău, Bacău County.

He married Maria Cândea née Antoniade on September 27, 1923 (born October 2, 1889 in Galați – died April 16, 1974 in Bucharest), a professor of French and Romanian, Doctor of Letters from the Sorbonne, who founded and served as principal of the Girls' Normal School "Queen Marie" (today the National Pedagogical College "Queen Marie") in Ploiești from November 10, 1918.

The couple had two children: Mioara-Rodica Georgescu née Cândea, an architect, (July 9, 1924, Ploiești – September 13, 2017, Montreal), and Ioan-Radu Cândea, a civil engineer (September 24, 1925, Ploiești – February 11, 2016, Bucharest).

Constantin Cândea passed away on March 4, 1971, in Bucharest at the age of 83. He was buried in Bellu Cemetery, Plot 4.

== Education ==
In 1906, he graduated from the "Prince Ferdinand" High School in Bacău, after which he attended the Königlich Bayerische Technische Hochschule München (today the Technical University of Munich), graduating in 1911 with a degree in Chemical engineering.

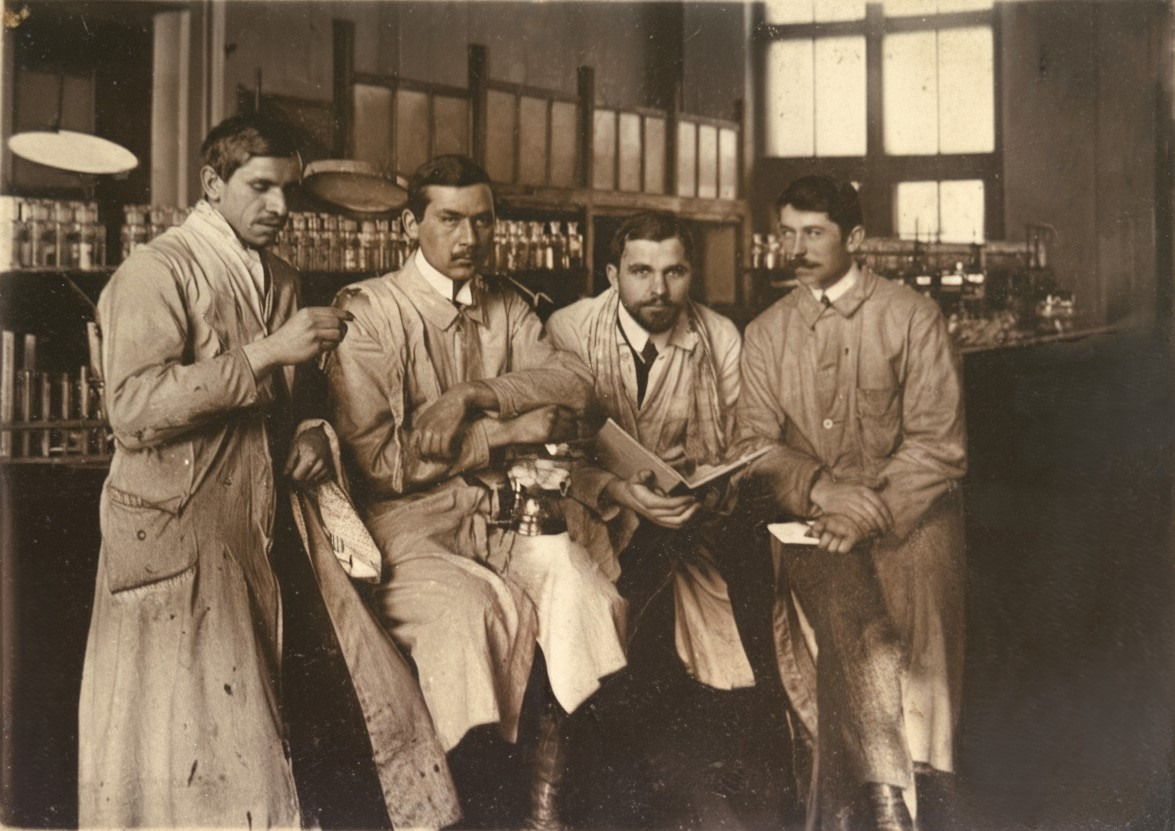
Constantin Cândea in the Quantitative Chemistry Laboratory at TUM, 1907

In 1920, Constantin Cândea obtained the degree of Doctor in Chemical Sciences from the Faculty of Sciences of Bucharest. His doctoral dissertation, structured in two parts, addressed both fundamental studies in organic chemistry and analyses concerning the economics of energy resources. The first part, entitled "On the Constitution of Diphenol-, Dithiophenol-, Di-α- and β-Naphthol, Dithionaphthol, Dimethylaniline-, Thionaphthenquinones, α-Naphtholisatin and Their Dye Derivatives", examined the structure and properties of a series of phenolic compounds and their derivatives relevant to dye chemistry. The second part, "The Importance of Petroleum for Romanian Industry", analyzed the strategic role of petroleum in the economic development of Romania during the first half of the twentieth century.

== Career and Professional Activity ==
At the beginning of his academic career, Constantin Cândea served as a lecturer at the Faculty of Sciences of the University of Bucharest, the institution where he also earned his doctorate in chemistry. At the same time, he was active as president of the Industrial Studies Circle, where he delivered lectures on policies for the development of Romanian industry.

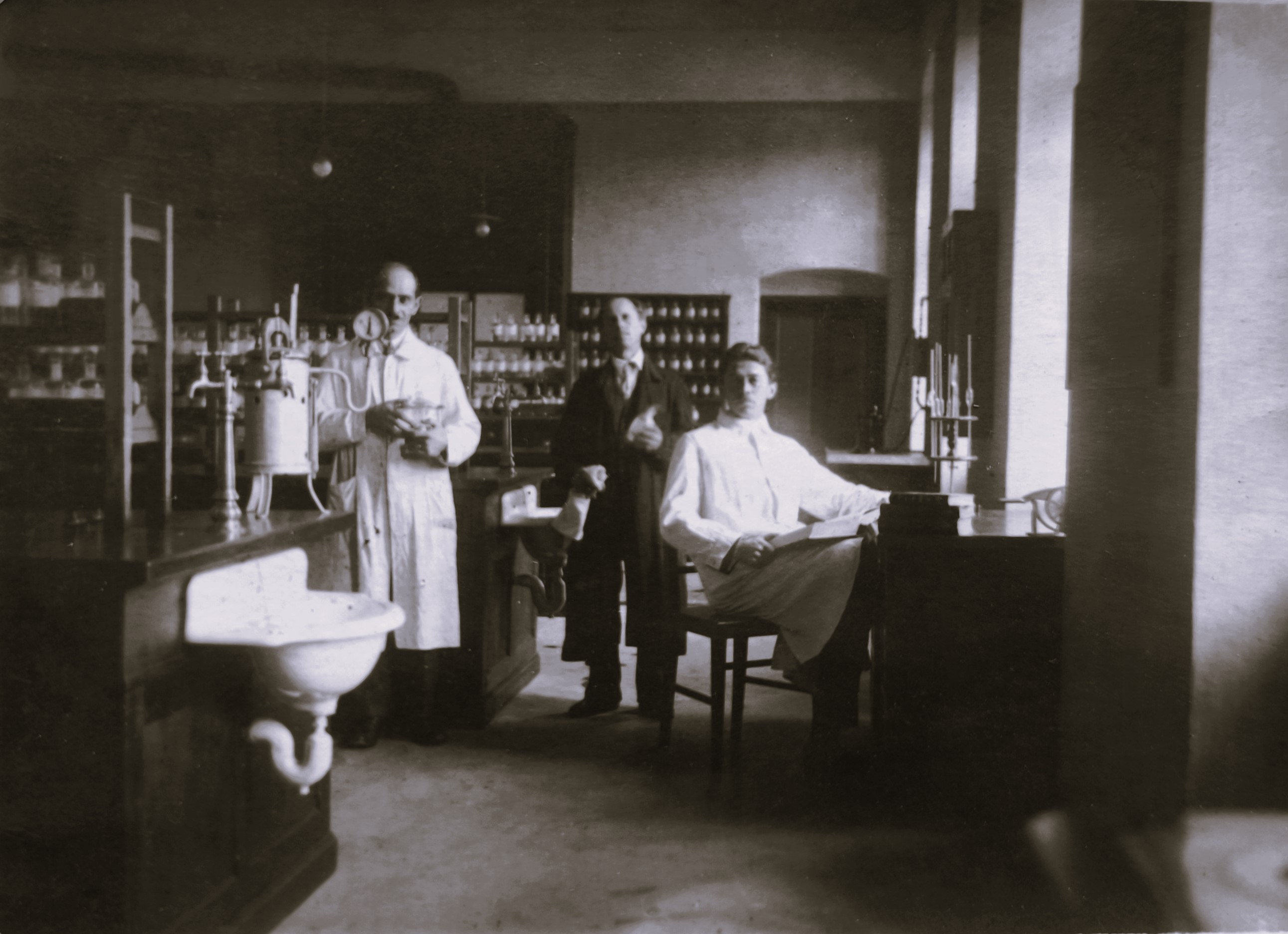
Constantin Cândea in the chemistry laboratory of the Polytechnic School of Timișoara

During the first academic year of the Polytechnic School of Timișoara, established following Royal Decree No. 4822 of November 11, 1920, issued by King Ferdinand I, Professor Constantin Cândea founded the chemistry laboratory, while Professor Constantin Stăncescu established the physics laboratory.

As part of his work at the Polytechnic School of Timișoara, during the 1922–1923 academic year, Constantin Cândea also established and directed an official Laboratory for Industrial Research, Studies and Analyses, separate from the teaching laboratories. The laboratory was intended to conduct applied research, technical-scientific studies, and chemical and chemical-engineering analyses for industry.

Organized into several industrial sections (inorganic industry, metallurgy, organic industry, fuels, and general expertise), the laboratory carried out analyses of industrial raw materials, fuels, oils, fats, metals, water, and chemical products, as well as studies with direct industrial applications. Constantin Cândea served as its director, working alongside specialists such as Er. Toporescu, Cerchez Manughevici, C. Ștefănescu, and other academic and technical staff members.

As part of his teaching activity, Constantin Cândea authored several university textbooks used as study materials at the Polytechnic School of Timișoara.

- 1928 – Course of Inorganic Chemistry: First Year, Polytechnic School of Timișoara
- 1928 – Course of Organic Chemistry: First Year, Polytechnic School of Timișoara
- 1929 – Course of Organic Chemistry II: Aromatic Series, Polytechnic School of Timișoara
- 1929 – Course of Petroleum Chemistry, Physics and Technology: Second Year, Polytechnic School of Timișoara

Throughout his academic career, Constantin Cândea regularly participated in international chemistry congresses, where he annually presented papers on the results of his research in organic and industrial chemistry in The Hague, Liège, Brussels, Prague, Paris, Madrid, Sardinia, Rome, and Nancy.

An important part of his scientific and educational work is today preserved in the collections of the Romanian Academy Library, where it is consulted as a reference source for the history of Romanian chemistry.

As Director of the Institute of Chemistry of the Polytechnic School of Timișoara, Constantin Cândea published numerous specialized studies in Romanian and foreign journals. Among these were "The Upgrading of Romanian Lignites", published in România Petroliferă, no. 393, May 31, 1943, and "The Utilization of Methane Gas", published in the same journal, no. 394, July 5, 1943, both reproduced in full by the publication.

On November 22, 1934, following elections for the leadership of the Polytechnic School of Timișoara, Constantin Cândea was elected President of the Council of Deans.

Beginning in 1942, Professor Constantin Cândea served as Vice-Dean of the Faculty of Mining and Metallurgy of the Polytechnic School of Timișoara, playing an important role in organizing the faculty's academic and administrative activities.

Subsequently, between 1946 and 1947, he served as rector of the Politehnica University of Timișoara—then known as the Polytechnic School of Timișoara.

== Technical and Industrial Expertise ==
=== Runcu–Scorțeni Investigation ===
In September 1929, Constantin Cândea participated as a petroleum-industry technical expert in the investigation of a major industrial accident that occurred at Well No. 4 "Romolea" of the Foraky Românească Company in the Runcu–Scorțeni oil field area of Prahova County.

The explosion occurred during intervention works on the extraction installation and resulted in fatalities, numerous serious injuries, and extensive material damage.

The investigation sought to determine the technical causes of the violent eruption of crude oil and gas, analyze the interventions carried out on the jammed well piston, and assess compliance with technical and safety regulations governing petroleum operations. The inquiry also examined the risks posed by accumulations of flammable gases and the procedures used during pressure-release operations in the well column.

Dr. Eng. Constantin Cândea's participation in this investigation reflected recognition of his scientific and technical expertise in petrochemistry and industrial safety. He was appointed by the Ministry of Labour to identify the causes of the accident, clarify responsibilities, and formulate recommendations aimed at preventing similar accidents in Romania's petroleum-producing regions.

== Patents ==
During his scientific and applied research career, Professor Constantin Cândea held several patents in the fields of industrial chemistry and hydrocarbon use, including:

- 1932: Constantin Cândea, as principal inventor together with J. Kühn, obtained Patent No. 20787/1932, entitled "Process for the Decomposition of Hydrocarbons into Carbon and Hydrogen". The patent was granted by Royal Decree No. 924 of 1932, published in the Official Gazette, Part I, No. 148 of June 27, 1932. In the subsequent detailed publication in the Official Gazette, Part I, No. 151 of June 30, 1932, the other co-applicants and economic holders of the patent are also listed, namely Maria Cassale-Sacchi and the company Cesag A.G., in accordance with the patent's administrative file.
- 1934: Constantin Cândea, as principal inventor together with Ilie G. Murgulescu and J. Kühn, obtained Romanian Royal Patent No. 23259/1934, entitled "Conversion of Methane by Metallic Chlorides". The patent is mentioned in the Official Gazette, Part I, No. 118 of May 28, 1945, in the context of the publication of the Ministry of National Education report concerning the transformation of the chemistry lectureship at the Faculty of Mining and Metallurgy of the Polytechnic School of Timișoara into a chair of Analytical and Physical Chemistry, and the appointment of Ilie G. Murgulescu as full professor.

== Political Activity ==
In June 1939, Constantin Cândea ran as an independent candidate and was elected a deputy to the Chamber of Deputies, representing the category of "Intellectual Professions" in the Timiș electoral district, in his capacity as an academic and technical personality. He served on the Committee for National Education, Religious Affairs, and Arts. His mandate ended in September 1940 with the dissolution of Parliament.

On June 23, 1939, as part of his parliamentary activity, Professor Cândea delivered a speech before the Chamber of Deputies in which he addressed the role of higher technical education, scientific research, and industry in economic development and the strengthening of national defense. He put forward concrete proposals concerning the modernization and expansion of polytechnic schools, the establishment of scientific research institutes connected to national defense, the development of the Polytechnic School of Timișoara, support for university research, the specialization of young engineers, the creation of strategic industries, the use of natural resources, and the encouragement of private enterprise.

== Honors and awards ==
Throughout his career, Constantin Cândea was awarded the Order of the Crown of Romania in the rank of Officer and the Order of the Star of Romania in the rank of Knight, in recognition of his contributions to the development of technical education and academic life during the interwar period. He also received the Commemorative Cross of the War of 1916–1918, a distinction attesting to his involvement in Romania's national efforts during World War I. In 1967 he was awarded the Order of Labor, 3rd class.

== Affiliations ==
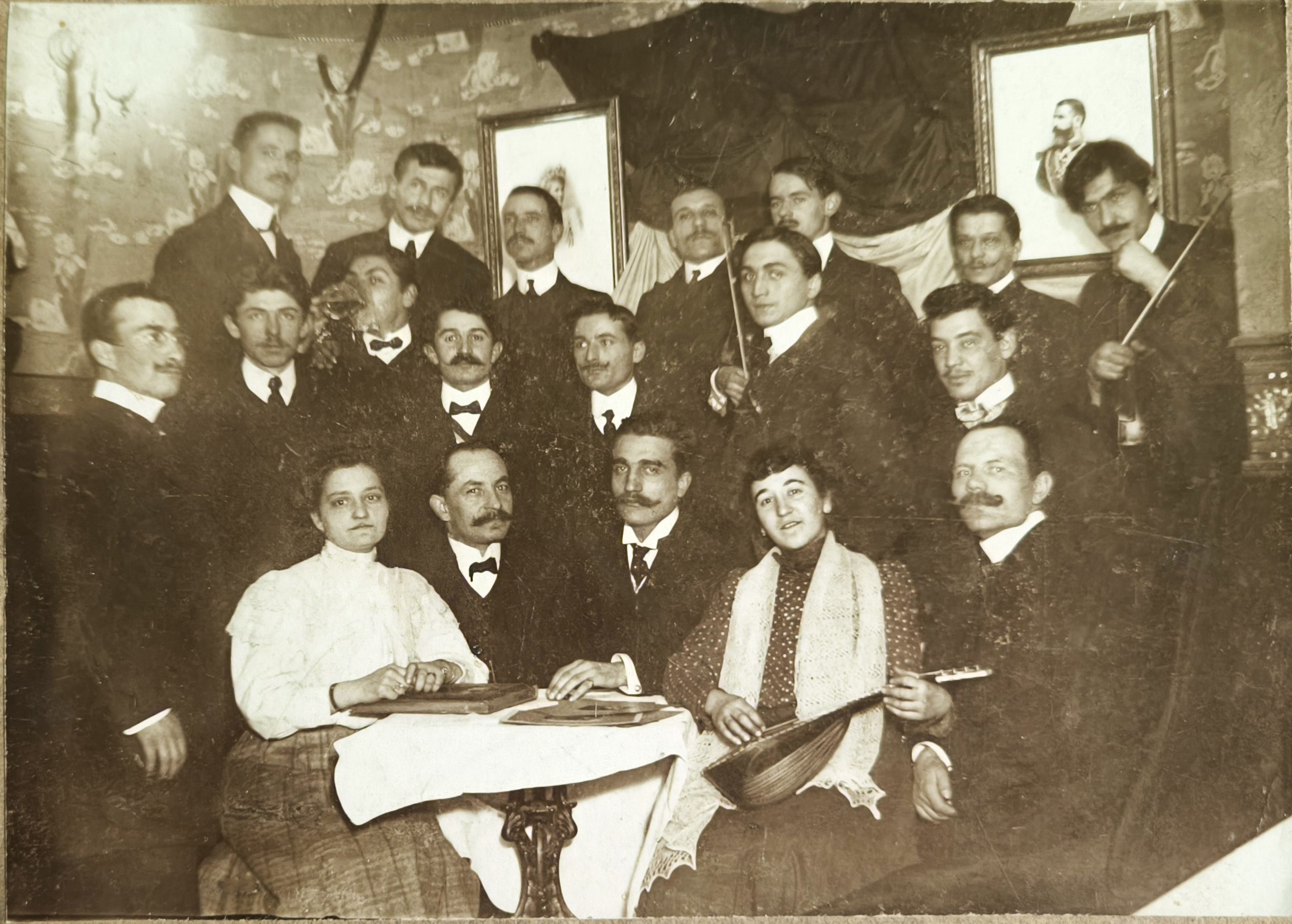
Constantin Cândea at the Romanian Students' Society in Munich, 1908

During his university studies in Munich, Constantin Cândea became a member of the Romanian Students' Society Patria in Munich in 1907. In May 1911, he was elected president of the organization, founded in 1898, whose objectives included the intellectual and cultural development of its members in the spirit of Romanian national identity, as well as the promotion of artistic, scientific, and literary activities and collegial and social engagement.

From February 1919, he became a member of the General Association of Engineers of Romania (AGIR).

From 1920, he served as president of the Industrial Studies Circle of the University of Bucharest.

Beginning in 1922, he served as honorary president of the Society of Students of the Polytechnic School of Timișoara; from 1923, he became a member of the Scientific Society of the Polytechnic School of Timișoara; and from 1925, he was part of the leadership of the Mining Students' Circle.

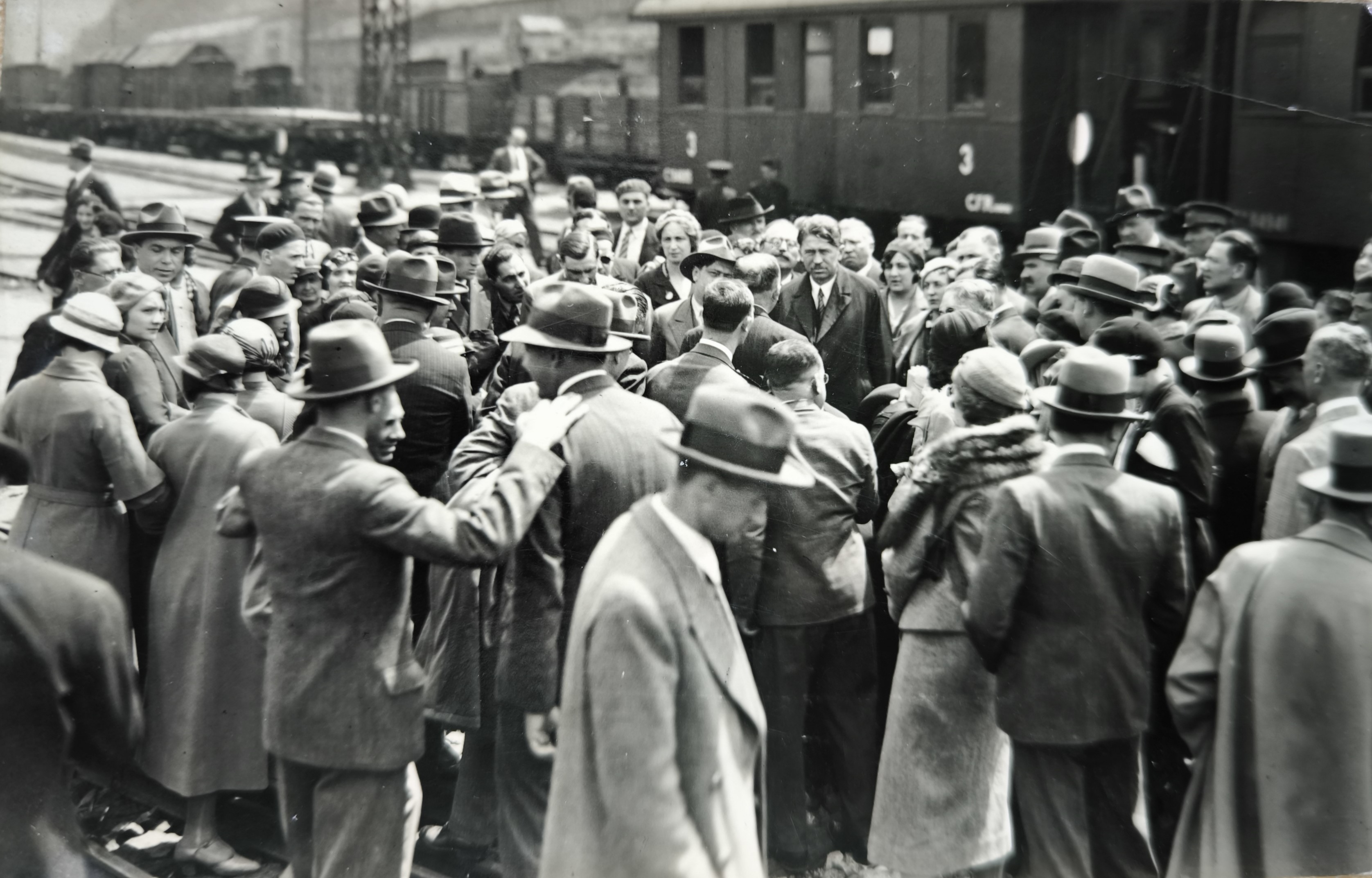
Constantin Cândea among the congress attendees at the railway station in Timișoara, 1933

In 1929, Constantin Cândea was appointed president of the Timișoara branch of the newly established Chemical Society of Romania. In this capacity, he coordinated the organization of the Fourth National Congress of Chemistry of Romania, held in Timișoara from May 21 to 24, 1933, serving as local chairman of the organizing committee. He led the branch until 1939, when the activities of the Chemical Society of Romania were suspended, resuming only in 1992.

From October 1935, he was a member of the Polytechnic Society of Romania.

He became a corresponding member of the Romanian Academy of Sciences on December 21, 1935, and a full member on December 20, 1936.

== Committees and Advisory Activities ==
Throughout his career, Constantin Cândea served on numerous committees and advisory bodies, contributing both to technical education and to industrial and national defense matters:

- Council for Advanced Studies of the Polytechnic School of Timișoara (from 1930) – as a delegated member of the professors' council, he participated in organizing educational activities and evaluating professional development programs.
- board of directors of the Polytechnic School of Timișoara (from 1930) – as a delegated member of the professors' council, he contributed to the institution's administrative and technical-pedagogical coordination.
- Executive Committee of the Banat-Crișana Social Institute (from 1932) – member.
- Technical Assessor to the Labor Court of Timișoara (from 1933) – provided expert opinions on technical and administrative issues in the engineering field.
- Advisory Commission of the Ministry of Army Equipment (from 1939) – appointed member of a scientific advisory commission dealing with technical and scientific matters related to national defense.
- Supervisory Administrator of the Municipal Electric Plant of Jimbolia (from June 12, 1945) – exercised oversight and technical coordination responsibilities in the local energy sector.
- Honorary Technical Adviser to the Ministry of Mines and Petroleum (from 1945) – honorary technical adviser to the Minister's Office, responsible for matters relating to industries connected with the mining sector.
- Member of the board of directors of the National Institute for Technological Research (from November 27, 1945), an institution established under Law No. 516 of June 30, 1945, and placed under the authority of the Ministry of Mines and Petroleum.

As a member and later chairman of university appointment committees, Constantin Cândea contributed to the promotion of Leon Sauciuc to the position of lecturer in Organic and Petroleum Chemistry at the Faculty of Mining and Metallurgy of the Polytechnic School of Timișoara, and of Ilie G. Murgulescu to the rank of full professor of Analytical and Physical Chemistry at the same faculty in 1945.

In 1946, at Constantin Cândea's initiative, in his capacity as chairman of the baccalaureate examination committee of the "Carmen Sylva" High School of Timișoara and Rector of the Polytechnic School of Timișoara, the sum of 642,000 lei was deposited into an account of the Savings and Deposit Bank (C.E.C.) to assist the victims of the drought and famine of 1946–1947 in Moldavia.

== Works ==
Professor Constantin Cândea maintained a prolific scientific activity in the fields of organic chemistry, inorganic chemistry, analytical chemistry, and petrochemistry. His works addressed topics such as the hydrogenation of petroleum and petroleum residues, the cracking and oxidation of hydrocarbons, the synthesis of organic compounds, qualitative and volumetric analysis of chemical substances, and the reactions of methane gas with various compounds. His contributions were published in both Romanian and international specialized journals, demonstrating a remarkable thematic and practical diversity.

All of the works listed below, together with his doctoral dissertation and the university textbooks he authored, are preserved in the collections of the Romanian Academy Library.

Year	Title (with English translation)	Co-authors	Journal / Venue	ISSN	Pages	Field
1924	Colorantul de dithymolizalină (Dithymolizaline Dye)	–	Buletinul Societății de Chimie din Timișoara	–	–	Organic chemistry / indicators
1932	La décomposition thermique du gaz méthane de Sărmășel (Thermal Decomposition of Sărmășel Methane Gas)	–	XIIe Congrès de Chimie Industrielle, Paris	–	–	Inorganic chemistry / methane
1933	Die Reduktion von Eisenerzen mit Naturgas (Reduction of Iron Ores with Natural Gas)	–	Rocznik Chemiczny (Polish Journal of Chemistry), vol. 13	–	–	Reduction reactions / metallurgy
1933	Sur la constitution de la bis-cliéthyl-anilinisatine et du colorant vert obtenu par oxydation (On the Constitution of Bis-Cliethyl-Anilinisatine and the Green Dye Obtained by Oxidation)	–	Bulletin Scientifique de l’École Polytechnique de Timișoara, tome 4, fasc. 3–4	–	–	Organic chemistry / dyes
1934	Die Reduktion von Eisenoxyd mit Naturgas (Reduction of Iron Oxide with Natural Gas)	–	Bulletin de la Société de Chimie de Roumanie	–	–	Metallurgical reductions
1934	Die Reduktion von Kupferoxyd und Zinndioxyd mit Naturgas (Reduction of Copper Oxide and Tin Dioxide with Natural Gas)	–	Petroleum, vol. 35	–	–	Metallurgy / reduction
1934	Die Umsetzung von Methan und Petroleum-Kohlenwasserstoffen mit Wasserdampf (Reaction of Methane and Petroleum Hydrocarbons with Steam)	–	Bulletin Scientifique de l’École Polytechnique de Timișoara, Band 5, Heft 2	–	–	Methane reforming
1934	La décomposition thermique du gaz méthane de Sărmășel – Communication présentée au XVIe Congrès de Chimie Industrielle (Thermal Decomposition of Sărmășel Methane Gas – Paper Presented at the 16th Congress of Industrial Chemistry)	–	Chimie et Industrie, vol. 33, nr. 4	–	–	Industrial chemistry
1934	Analitische Arbeitsmethoden (Analytical Working Methods)	L. Sauciuc	Bulletin Scientifique de l’École Polytechnique de Timișoara	–	–	Analytical chemistry
1934	Action du méthane sur le chlorure de sodium (Action of Methane on Sodium Chloride)	I. G. Murgulescu	XIVe Congrès de Chimie Industrielle, Paris	–	–	Methane reactivity / inorganic chemistry
1934	Trennung der Metalle der Kupfergruppe (Separation of the Copper-Group Metals)	–	Analytical and Bioanalytical Chemistry	1618–2642 (Print) / 1618–2650 (Online)	276–276	Analytical chemistry / metallurgy
1934	Zur Trennung der sauren Sulfide von den übrigen Gliedern des Schwefelwasserstoffniederschlags (On the Separation of Acid Sulfides from the Other Components of the Sulfide Precipitate)	–	Fresenius Journal of Analytical Chemistry	0937-0633 (Print) / 1432-1130 (Online)	118–118	Analytical chemistry
1934	Pour la séparation des sulfures acides des autres composés du précipité sulfuré (For the Separation of Acid Sulfides from the Other Components of the Sulfide Precipitate)	–	Analytical and Bioanalytical Chemistry	1618–2642 / 1618–2650	118–118	Analytical chemistry
1935	Action du gaz méthane sur les chlorures de lithium et de potassium (Action of Methane Gas on Lithium and Potassium Chlorides)	I. G. Murgulescu	Chimie et Industrie	–	–	Physical chemistry / inorganic chemistry
1935	Hydrogenation du pétrole roumain (Hydrogenation of Romanian Petroleum)	–	XIVe Congrès de Chimie Industrielle de France	–	–	Hydrogenation
1935	Beitrag zum Kracken eines rumänischen Petroleum bei Atmosphärendruck (Contribution to the Cracking of a Romanian Petroleum at Atmospheric Pressure)	L. Sauciuc	Bulletin Scientifique de l’École Polytechnique de Timișoara	–	–	Petrochemistry / cracking
1935	Die Wärmespaltung von rumänischem Petroleum aus Moreni (Thermal Decomposition of Romanian Petroleum from Moreni)	C. Manughevici	Bulletin Scientifique de l’École Polytechnique de Timișoara	–	–	Thermal degradation of petroleum
1935	La catalyse du pétrole lampant de Moreni (Catalysis of Moreni Kerosene)	J. Kühn, C. Manughevici	Paris	–	–	Catalysis / petroleum products
1935	Bromderivés de quinoléinhomoneurine (Brominated Derivatives of Quinoléinhomoneurine)	E. Macovski, J. Kühn	Atti del V Congresso nazionale di chimica pura ed applicata, Sardegna	–	–	Brominated organic compounds
1935	La decomposizione termica del petrolio rumeno di Moreni nei riguardi della formazione di etilene (Thermal Decomposition of Romanian Petroleum from Moreni with Respect to Ethylene Formation)	C. Manughevici	Atti del V Congresso nazionale di chimica	–	–	Cracking / ethylene
1935	Die konduktometrische Titration der Molybdate mit Silbernitrat (Conductometric Titration of Molybdates with Silver Nitrate)	I. G. Murgulescu	Bulletin de la Société Chimique Roumaine, vol. XVII	–	103–110	Analytical chemistry
1935	Die konduktometrische Titration der Wolframate mit Silbernitrat (Conductometric Titration of Tungstates with Silver Nitrate)	I. G. Murgulescu	Bulletin de la Société Chimique Roumaine, vol. XVII	–	223	Analytical chemistry
1936	Anreicherung der aromatischen Kohlenwasserstoffe in Benzin (Enrichment of Aromatic Hydrocarbons in Gasoline)	L. Sauciuc	Bulletin Scientifique de l’École Polytechnique de Timișoara	–	–	Aromatic hydrocarbons
1936	Die thermische Spaltung von Benzin und Heizöl unter Berücksichtigung der Äthylen-Bildung (Thermal Decomposition of Gasoline and Fuel Oil, with Consideration of Ethylene Formation)	C. Manughevici	Bulletin Scientifique de l’École Polytechnique de Timișoara, tome 6, fasc. 3–4	–	–	Industrial chemistry / petrochemistry
1936	Einfluss der hohen Temperaturen auf Krackgase, erhalten durch thermische Spaltung von rumänischem Petroleum (Moreni) (Influence of High Temperatures on Cracking Gases Obtained by Thermal Decomposition of Romanian Petroleum (Moreni))	E. Macowski	Bulletin Scientifique de l’École Polytechnique de Timișoara, tome 6, fasc. 3–4	–	–	Industrial chemistry / petrochemistry
1936	Hydrogénation destructive des résidus du pétrole roumain de Moreni (Destructive Hydrogenation of Romanian Petroleum Residues from Moreni)	A. Marschall	Chimie et Industrie	–	–	Hydrogenation / petroleum residues
1936	Dosage volumétrique du plomb et des molybdates avec des indicateurs d’absorption (Volumetric Determination of Lead and Molybdates Using Adsorption Indicators)	I. G. Murgulescu	Annales de chimie analytique	–	–	Analytical chemistry / titrimetry
1936	Action du gaz méthan de Sărmășel sur le chlorure de lithium et de potassium (Action of Sărmășel Methane Gas on Lithium and Potassium Chloride)	I. G. Murgulescu	Chimie et Industrie, vol. 36, nr. 5	–	–	Methane reactivity
1937	Action du méthan sur le chlorure de strontium et de baryum (Action of Methane on Strontium and Barium Chlorides)	I. G. Murgulescu	Chimie et Industrie, vol. 38, nr. 1	–	–	Inorganic chemistry / methane reactions
1937	Blei (Lead)	–	Analytical and Bioanalytical Chemistry, vol. 110, nr. 5	1618–2642 / 1618–2650	206–208	Analytical chemistry
1937	Hydrogenation du pétrole roumain (Hydrogenation of Romanian Petroleum)	–	IIe Congrès mondial du Pétrole, Paris	–	–	Hydrogenation
1937	Hydrogenation du pétrole roumain (Hydrogenation of Romanian Petroleum)	–	Comptes rendus de l’Académie des Sciences de Roumanie	–	–	Hydrogenation
1937	Hydrogenation destructive de la paraffine (Destructive Hydrogenation of Paraffin)	–	Acad. des Sciences de Roumanie	–	–	Hydrogenation
1937	Spalten schwerer Mineralöle bei Atmosphärendruck (Decomposition of Heavy Mineral Oils at Atmospheric Pressure)	L. I. Sauciuc	Bulletin Scientifique de l’École Polytechnique de Timișoara, tome 7, fasc. 1–2	–	–	Industrial chemistry / petrochemistry
1937	Über den Einfluss verschiedener Stoffe auf das Verhalten von Motortreibmittel bei der Oxydation (On the Influence of Various Substances on the Oxidation Behavior of Motor Fuels)	N. Cristodulo	Bulletin Scientifique de l’École Polytechnique de Timișoara, tome 7, fasc. 1–2	–	–	Industrial chemistry / fuels
1938	Destruktive Hydrierung eines rumänischen Paraffins (Destructive Hydrogenation of a Romanian Paraffin)	L. Sauciuc	Atti del X Congresso Internazionale di Chimica	–	–	Hydrogenation / paraffins
1938	Hydrogénation du pétrole roumain de Bucsani (Hydrogenation of Romanian Petroleum from Bucsani)	J. Kühn	XVIIIe Congrès de Chimie Industrielle, Nancy	–	–	Petrochemistry / hydrogenation
1939	Spalthydrierung von Petroleum (Hydrogenative Cracking of Petroleum)	–	Petroleum, nr. 43, 42	–	–	Hydrogenation / thermal degradation
1939	Hidrogenarea țițeiului de Bucșani (Hydrogenation of Bucșani Crude Oil)	–	Petroleum	–	–	Petrochemistry
1939	Destruktive Hydrierung eines rumänischen Paraffins (Destructive Hydrogenation of a Romanian Paraffin)	–	Petroleum Zeitschrift	–	–	Hydrogenation
1939	Die Hydrierung von Erdöl aus Boldesti im rotierenden Autoklaven (Hydrogenation of Boldești Petroleum in a Rotating Autoclave)	J. Kühn	Petroleum Zeitschrift	–	–	Hydrogenation technology
1939	Qualitative Analyse (Qualitative Analysis)	–	Analytical and Bioanalytical Chemistry, vol. 108, nr. 9	1618–2642 / 1618–2650	340–345	Analytical chemistry
1939	Brennstoffe, Kraftstoffe (Fuels and Motor Fuels)	–	Analytical and Bioanalytical Chemistry, vol. 118, nr. 5	1618–2642 / 1618–2650	208–222	Petrochemistry / fuels
1941	Die Oxydation rumänischem Petroleums (Oxidation of Romanian Petroleum)	C. Manughevici, N. Cristodulo	Bulletin Scientifique de l’École Polytechnique de Timișoara	–	–	Petroleum oxidation
1941	Hydrierung rumänischer Braunkohle; Die Oxydation von Petroleum; Die Kondensation der Oxybenzaldehyde mit Nitrofluoren (Hydrogenation of Romanian Lignite; Oxidation of Petroleum; Condensation of Oxybenzaldehydes with Nitrofluorene)	–	Institut des Sciences de Roumanie	–	–	Hydrogenation / oxidation / synthesis
1941	Hydrierung rumänischer Braunkohle (Hydrogenation of Romanian Lignite)	–	Acad. des Sciences de Roumanie, Tome V, 1–2	–	–	Lignite hydrogenation
1941	Hydrierungsversuche an rumänischer Braunkohle (Hydrogenation Experiments on Romanian Lignite)	–	Öl und Kohle, vol. 39, nr. 2	–	–	Hydrogenation
1942	Druckhydrierung von Krackbenzin (Pressure Hydrogenation of Cracked Gasoline)	–	Institut des Sciences de Roumanie	–	–	High-pressure hydrogenation
1942	Die Kondensation der Oxybenzaldehyde und Nitrobenzaldehyde cu 2.7-Dinitro-fluoren (Condensation of Oxybenzaldehydes and Nitrobenzaldehydes with 2,7-Dinitrofluorene)	–	European Journal of Inorganic Chemistry, vol. 75, nr. 12	1434–1948	2017–2018	Organic synthesis
1942	Gazul metan în legătură cu apărarea națională (Methane Gas in Relation to National Defense)	–	Buletinul Academiei de Științe din România, nr. 10	–	–	Energy strategy
1943	Organische Stickstoffverbindungen (Organic Nitrogen Compounds)	–	Analytical and Bioanalytical Chemistry, vol. 125, nr. 1	1618–2642 / 1618–2650	48–57	Organic chemistry
1943	Die Umsetzung von Methan-Gas mit Zinkchlorid (Reaction of Methane Gas with Zinc Chloride)	I. G. Murgulescu	Angewandte Chemie	0044-8249 / 1521–3757	247–248	Methane reactivity / inorganic chemistry
1943	Die Oxydation rumänischer Handelsbenzine (Oxidation of Romanian Commercial Gasolines)	N. Cristodulo	Bulletin Scientifique de l’École Polytechnique de Timișoara	–	–	Gasoline oxidation
1943	Hydrierung von Erdölrückständen (Hydrogenation of Petroleum Residues)	L. Sauciuc	Bulletin Scientifique de l’École Polytechnique de Timișoara	–	–	Hydrogenation of petroleum residues
1943	Innobilarea ligniților românești (Upgrading of Romanian Lignites)	–	Buletinul Societății Politehnice din România, April 15, 1943	–	–	Lignite processing
1944	Die Oxydation von Maisöl und Sonnenblumenöl (Oxidation of Corn Oil and Sunflower Oil)	C. Manughevici	Bulletin Scientifique de l’École Polytechnique de Timișoara	–	–	Oxidation of vegetable oils
1945	Hidrogenarea cărbunilor de Doman din Banat (Hydrogenation of Doman Coals from Banat)	Filofteia Dobrescu	Bulletin Scientifique de l’École Polytechnique de Timișoara	–	–	Coal hydrogenation
1948	Hidrogenarea petrolului (Hydrogenation of Petroleum)	–	Bulletin de Science et Technique de la Polytechnique de Timișoara, tome 13, fasc. 1	–	7 p.	Petrochemistry / hydrogenation

Preceded by Marin Bănărescu	Rector of the Polytechnic University of Timișoara; 1946–1947	Succeeded by Ilie G. Murgulescu
