= Romanian Academy of Sciences =

Science academy in Romania (1935–1948)

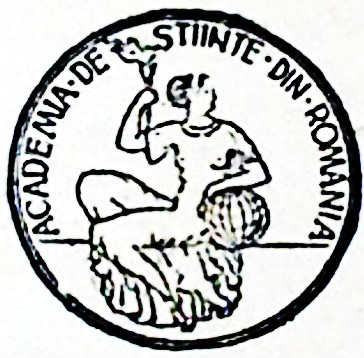
Logo of the Romanian Academy of Sciences

The Romanian Academy of Sciences was an institution established in Romania by a group of 26 scientists, dissatisfied with the imperfect organization of the Scientific Section of the Romanian Academy, which was left in the background, with only 12 seats to represent all sciences.

== Short history ==
On March 29, 1935, the institution, which was established de facto on March 11, 1935, received legal personality.

According to the statute, the purpose of the Romanian Academy of Sciences was to encourage and guide the scientific creation by:

a) facilitating the networking of the researchers in various pure and applied scientific specialties and circulation of their research results through communications, reports, publications, exhibitions, etc.
b) stimulating research through awards for valuable works, by subsidizing etc.
c) scientific initiation of the staff of the special institutions that depend to the Academy of Sciences.

To this end, finally, the Romanian Academy of Sciences set the number of full members to be 120, with up to 12 members of each of the 10 sections:

1.Section of Mathematics and Astronomy;
2.Section of Physics;
3.Section of Chemistry;
4.Section Biology (Zoology, Botany, Physiology);
5.Section of Applied Biology;
6.Section of Geology, Mineralogy and Geography;
7.Section of Military Science with application to the national defense;
8.Section of History and Philosophy of Science, Organizing, Education and Awareness;
9.Technical Section;
10.Section of Social and Economic Sciences.

Following the intervention in court of the Romanian Academy, by Decree Law no. 2418 / July 7, 1938, published in The Official Monitor no. 154/ July 8, 1938, the Romanian Academy of Sciences was banned from wearing the title of the Academy, considered as the monopoly of another older institution. As a result, on September 24, 1938, the General Assembly of the Romanian Academy of Sciences has decided to change its name to ″The Romanian Institute of Sciences″.

By the Decree Law 3714 / November 6, 1940, published on November 7, 1940 in the Official Monitor No. 261, Part I, it was decided that the ″Romanian Institute of Sciences″, legal person established in Bucharest, to be named again the ″Romanian Academy of Sciences″.

The Romanian Academy of Sciences was dissolved in 1948. By the Great National Assembly Presidium Decree no. 76, published in the Official Monitor No.132 bis / June 9, 1948, The Romanian Academy was turned into the Romanian People's Republic Academy and the Romanian Academy of Sciences was incorporated in the Romanian People's Republic Academy, all its movable and immovable goods and heritage being integrated in the new Academy.

Currently, the Academy of Romanian Scientists, founded in 2007, is considered the successor and sole legatee of the Romanian Academy of Sciences (1935-1948) and the Association of Romanian Scientists, founded in 1956.

== Bibliography ==
- *** Academia de Științe din România. Buletin, 1(1936) - 14(1945-1946).
- Botez, Elvira, Scurt istoric al Asociațiunii Române pentru înaintarea și răspândirea științelor, în NOEMA, IV, 2005, l, pp. 159–167.
- *** Comptes Rendus des séances de l'Académie des Sciences de Roumanie, I (1936-1937) - VIII (1946-1947).
- Negulescu P. P., Reforma învățământului. Ed. 2-a. București 1927, Ed. Casei Școalelor, pp. CLXXIX-CLXXX.
- Rusu, Dorina N., Istoria Academiei Române. Repere cronologice, București, Ed. Academiei Române, 1992, p. 227.
- Rusu, Dorina N., Membrii Academiei Române 1866-2003 Dicționar, București, Ed. Academiei Române, 2003.
