= List of people from Timișoara =

This is a list of people from Timișoara, Romania (included in the list are natives as well as permanent and/or temporary residents).

== Arts ==
=== Architecture ===
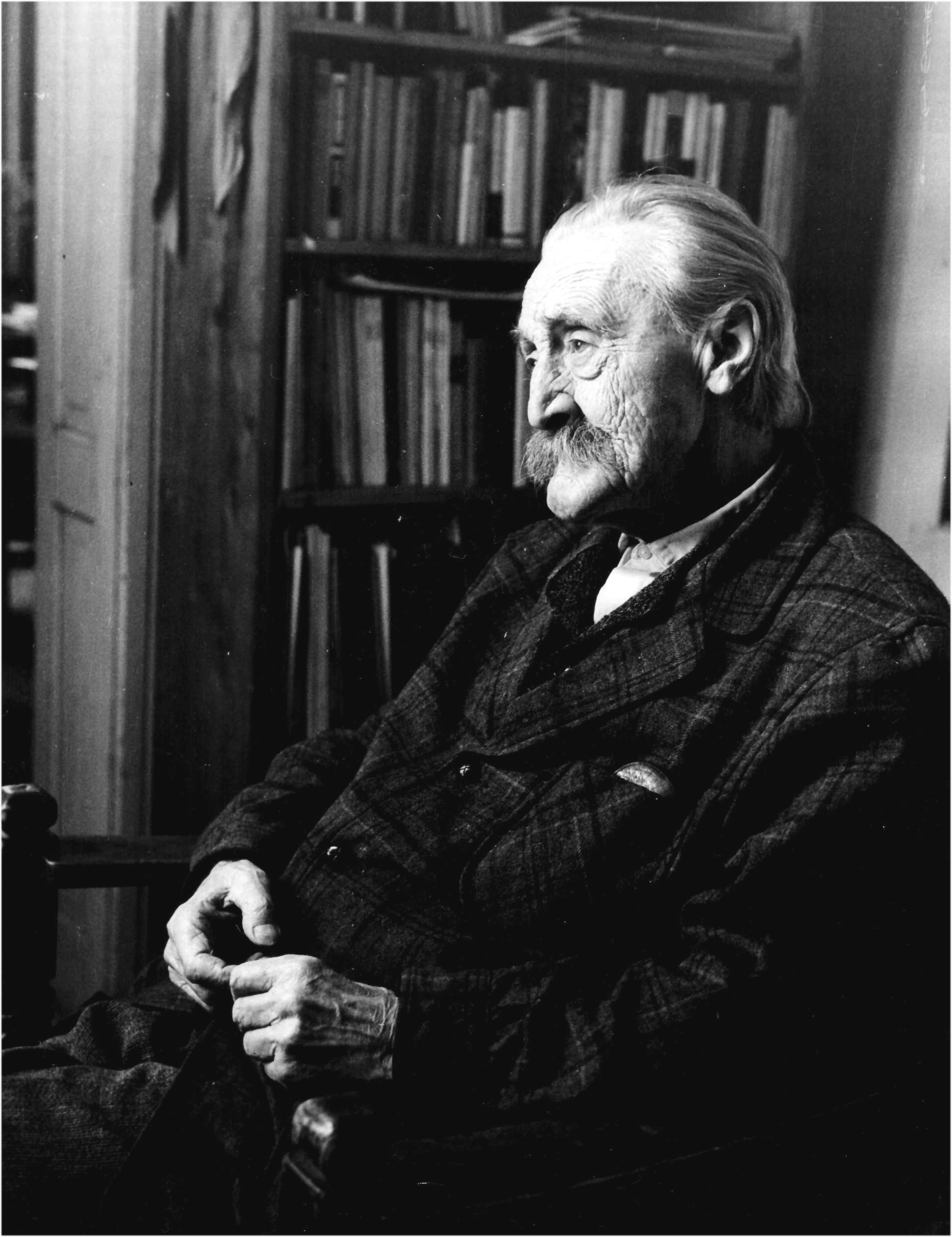
Károly Kós

- Ferenc Reitter (1813–1874), architect and engineer
- Aladár Árkay (1868–1932), architect, craftsman and painter
- Ernő Foerk (1868–1934), architect
- Károly Kós (1883–1977), architect, writer, graphic artist, ethnographer and politician

=== Comics ===
- André François (1915–2005), cartoonist

=== Literature and poetry ===
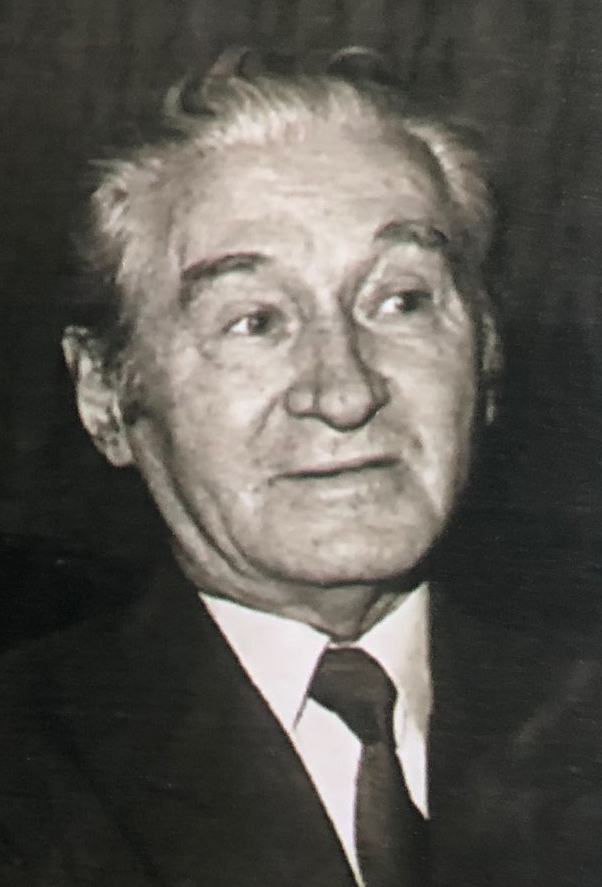
Miloš Crnjanski

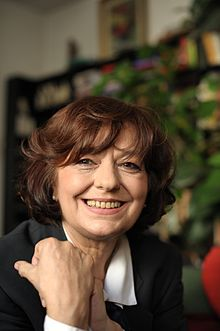
Ana Blandiana

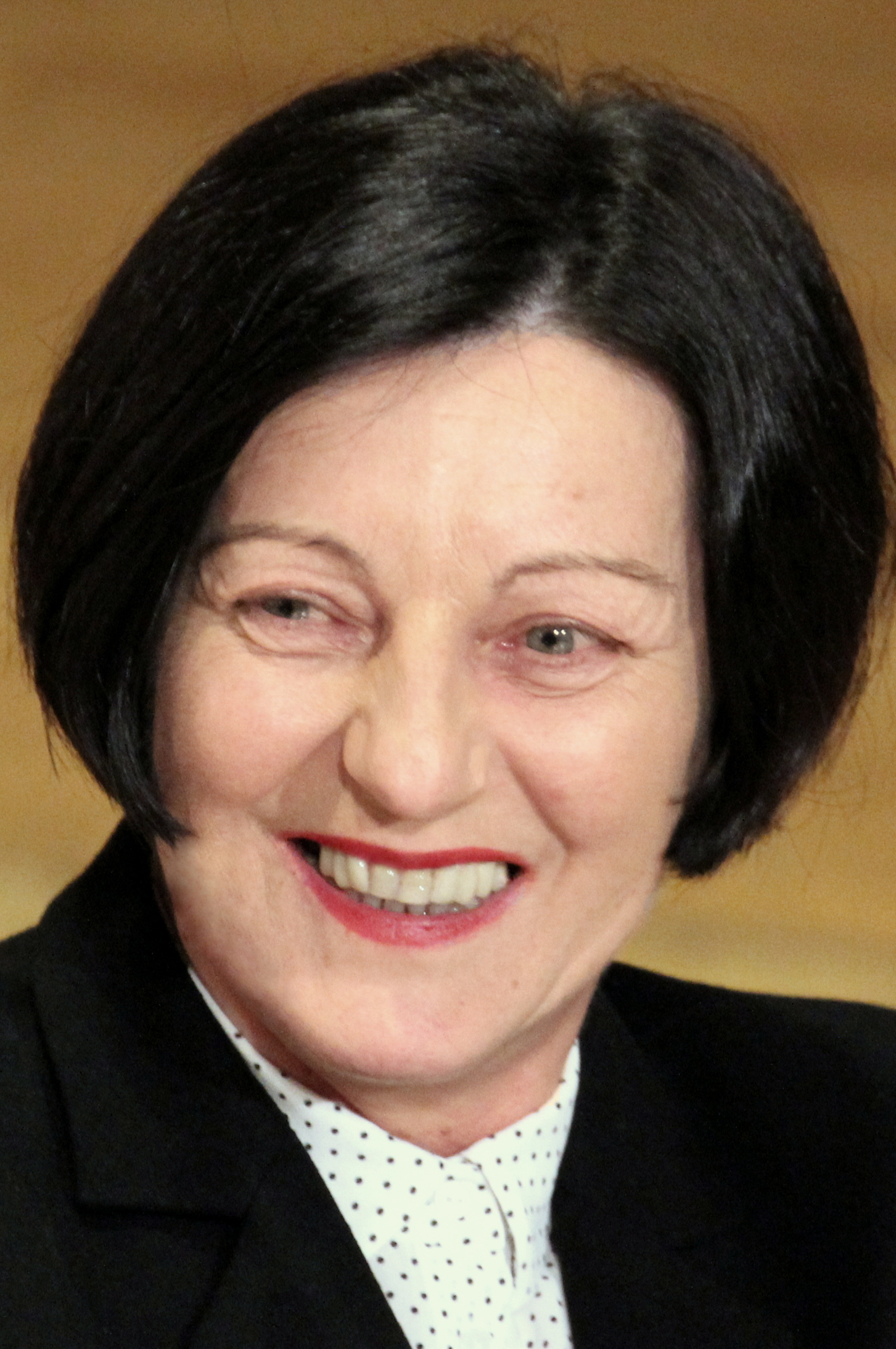
Herta Müller

- Pelbartus Ladislaus (1430–1504), Franciscan writer and preacher
- Osman Ağa (1670–1725), military officer and autobiographer
- Ioan Slavici (1848–1925), writer and journalist; he attended the German-language high school in Timișoara
- Franz Xaver Kappus (1883–1966), military officer, journalist, editor and writer
- Miloš Crnjanski (1893–1977), writer and diplomat; he grew up in Timișoara
- Camil Petrescu (1894–1957), playwright, novelist, philosopher and poet; he taught at the Higher School of Commerce in Timișoara
- Wilhelm Stepper-Tristis (1899–?), novelist, journalist and literary critic
- Ezra Fleischer (1928–2006), poet and philologist
- Petre Stoica (1931–2009), poet and translator; he attended high school in Timișoara
- Ana Blandiana (b. 1942), poet, essayist and civil rights activist
- Șerban Foarță (b. 1942), writer; he lives in Timișoara
- Dorin Tudoran (b. 1945), poet, essayist, journalist and dissident
- Marianne Hirsch (b. 1949), literary scholar
- Ioan Mihai Cochinescu (b. 1951), novelist and essayist
- Richard Wagner (1952–2023), novelist; he lived in Timișoara
- Herta Müller (b. 1953), novelist, poet, essayist and recipient of the 2009 Nobel Prize in Literature; she lived in Timișoara
- George Șerban (1954–1998), journalist, writer and politician; he lived in Timișoara
- Brîndușa Armanca (b. 1954), journalist and teacher

=== Painting ===
- Károly Brocky (1808–1855), painter
- Pavel Petrović (1818–1887), painter
- Ludwig Michalek (1859–1942), painter, graphic artist and engraver
- Adolf Hirémy-Hirschl (1860–1933), painter
- Julius Podlipny (1898–1991), painter, drawer and teacher; he lived in Timișoara
- Diet Sayler (b. 1939), painter and sculptor
- Bogdan Achimescu (b. 1965), visual artist

=== Sculpture ===
- Ingo Glass (b. 1941), sculptor

== Business ==
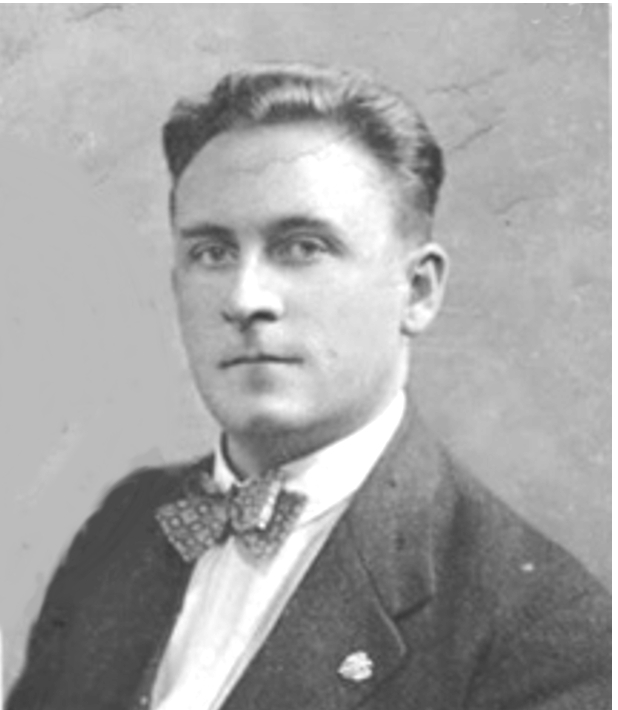
Francesco Illy

- Meir Amigo (18th century), businessman, philanthropist and community leader; he lived in Timișoara
- Adam F. Poltl (1891–1969), businessman and politician
- Francesco Illy (1892–1956), inventor of espresso machine and founder of illy
- Ovidiu Tender (b. 1956), businessman
- Florentin Banu (b. 1967), businessman

== Clergy ==
- Augustin Pacha (1870–1954), first bishop of the Roman Catholic Diocese of Timișoara
- Adalbert Boros (1908–2003), auxiliary bishop of the Roman Catholic Diocese of Timișoara
- Sebastian Kräuter (1922–2008), bishop of the Roman Catholic Diocese of Timișoara
- Martin Roos (b. 1942), bishop of the Roman Catholic Diocese of Timișoara
- László Tőkés (b. 1952), pastor and politician; he was an assistant pastor in Timișoara

== Criminal ==
- Emil Mătăsăreanu (1966–1997), bank robber in America

== Entertainment ==
=== Film, theatre and television ===
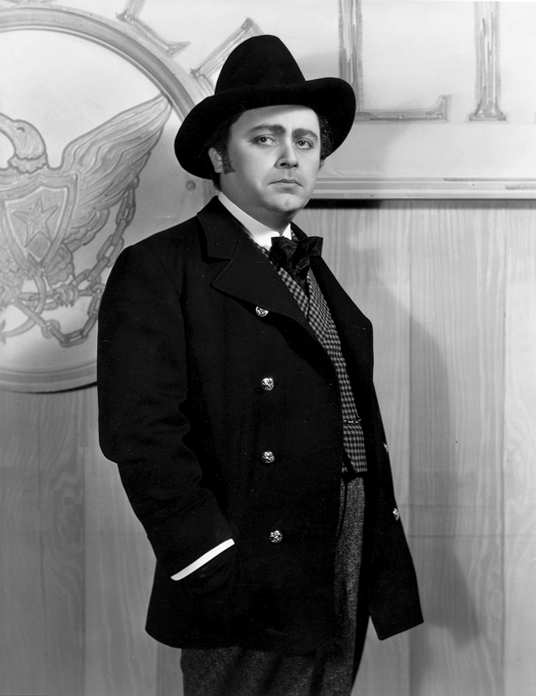
J. Edward Bromberg

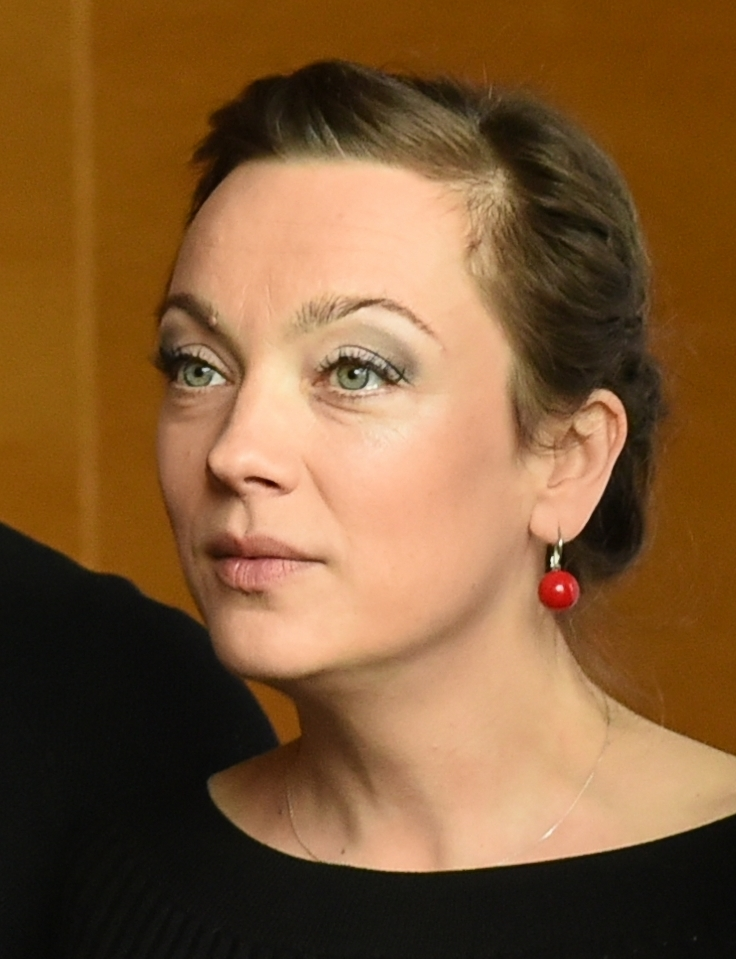
Anca Miruna Lăzărescu

- Aleksa Bačvanski (1832–1881), actor and theatre director
- J. Edward Bromberg (1903–1951), character actor
- Zita Johann (1904–1993), actress
- Silviu Stănculescu (1932–1998), actor
- Robert Dornhelm (b. 1947), film and television director
- Julieta Szönyi (1949–2025), actress
- Andrei Ujică (b. 1951), screenwriter and film director
- Florin Călinescu (b. 1956), actor, theatre director, TV host, and politician
- Hanno Höfer (b. 1967), film director, producer, and musician
- Gábor Rappert–Vencz (b. 1967), stage actor
- Dan Negru (b. 1971), TV presenter and host
- Mile Cărpenișan (1975–2010), war correspondent
- Anca Miruna Lăzărescu (b. 1979), film director and screenwriter
- Alexandru Potocean (b. 1984), actor
- Gratiela Brancusi (b. 1989), actress

=== Music ===
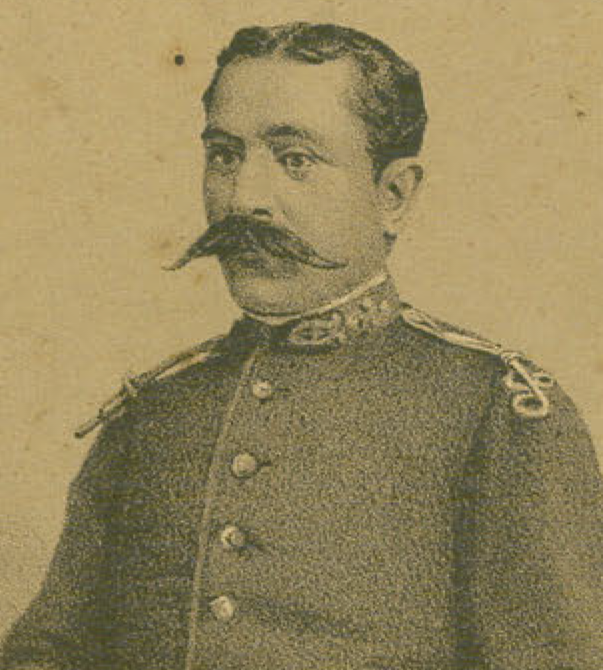
Ion Ivanovici

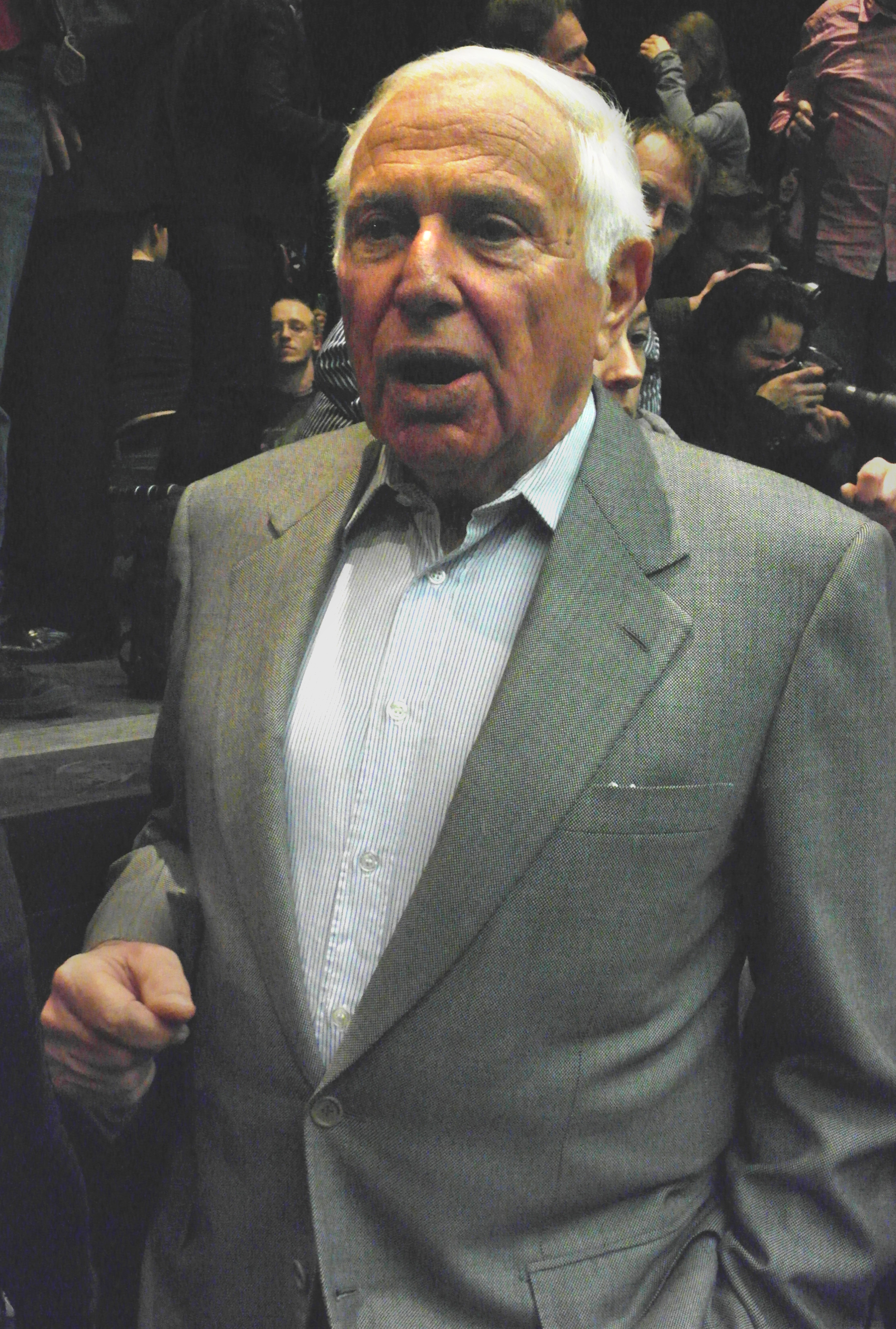
Ioan Holender

- Franz Limmer (1808–1857), composer and conductor; he lived in Timișoara
- Ion Ivanovici (1845–1902), military band conductor and composer
- Margaret Matzenauer (1881–1963), mezzo-soprano
- Zeno Coste (1907–1985), singer
- Charles Bruck (1911–1995), conductor
- Johanna Martzy (1924–1979), violinist
- Cornel Trăilescu (1926–2019), opera composer and conductor
- Francisco Kröpfl (1931–2021), composer and music theorist
- Ferdinand Weiss (1932–2002), pianist
- Hugo Jan Huss (1934–2006), conductor and music director
- Ervin Acél (1935–2006), conductor
- Ioan Holender (b. 1935), operatic baritone and the longest-serving director of the Vienna State Opera
- Yehuda Yannay (1937–2023), composer
- Nicu Covaci (1947–2024), soloist and guitarist of Phoenix
- Eugen Gondi (b. 1947), jazz drummer
- Mircea Baniciu (b. 1949), vocalist and guitarist of Pasărea Colibri
- Bujor Hoinic (b. 1950), composer, conductor and teacher
- Adrian Bărar (1960–2021), vocalist and guitarist of Cargo
- Aura Twarowska (b. 1967), mezzo-soprano; soloist of the Timișoara National Opera between 1997 and 2010
- Carmen Șerban (b. 1971), singer
- Pacha Man (b. 1975), hip-hopper
- Cristian Măcelaru (b. 1980), conductor
- Miss Platnum (b. 1980), singer, songwriter and musician

== Military ==
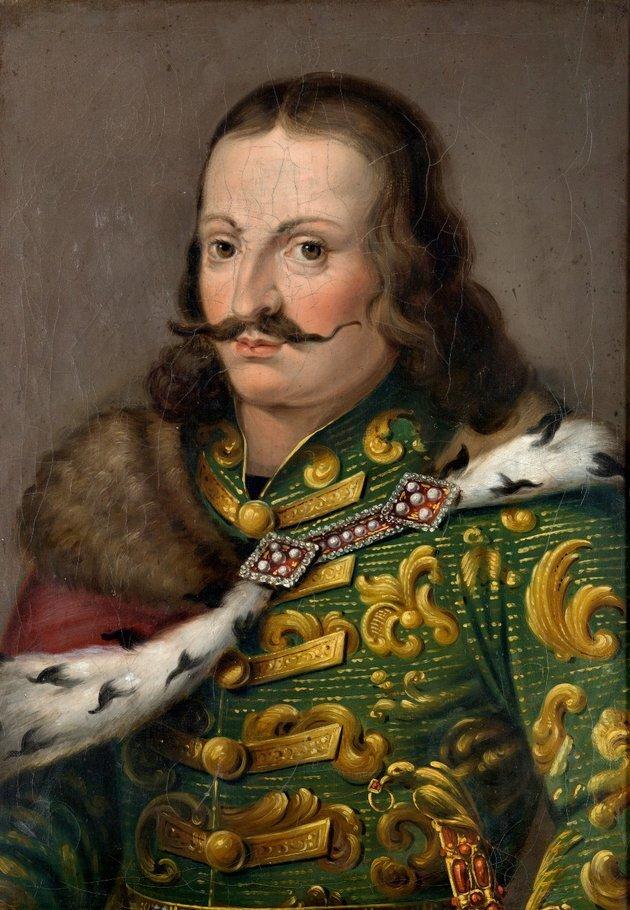
János Hunyadi

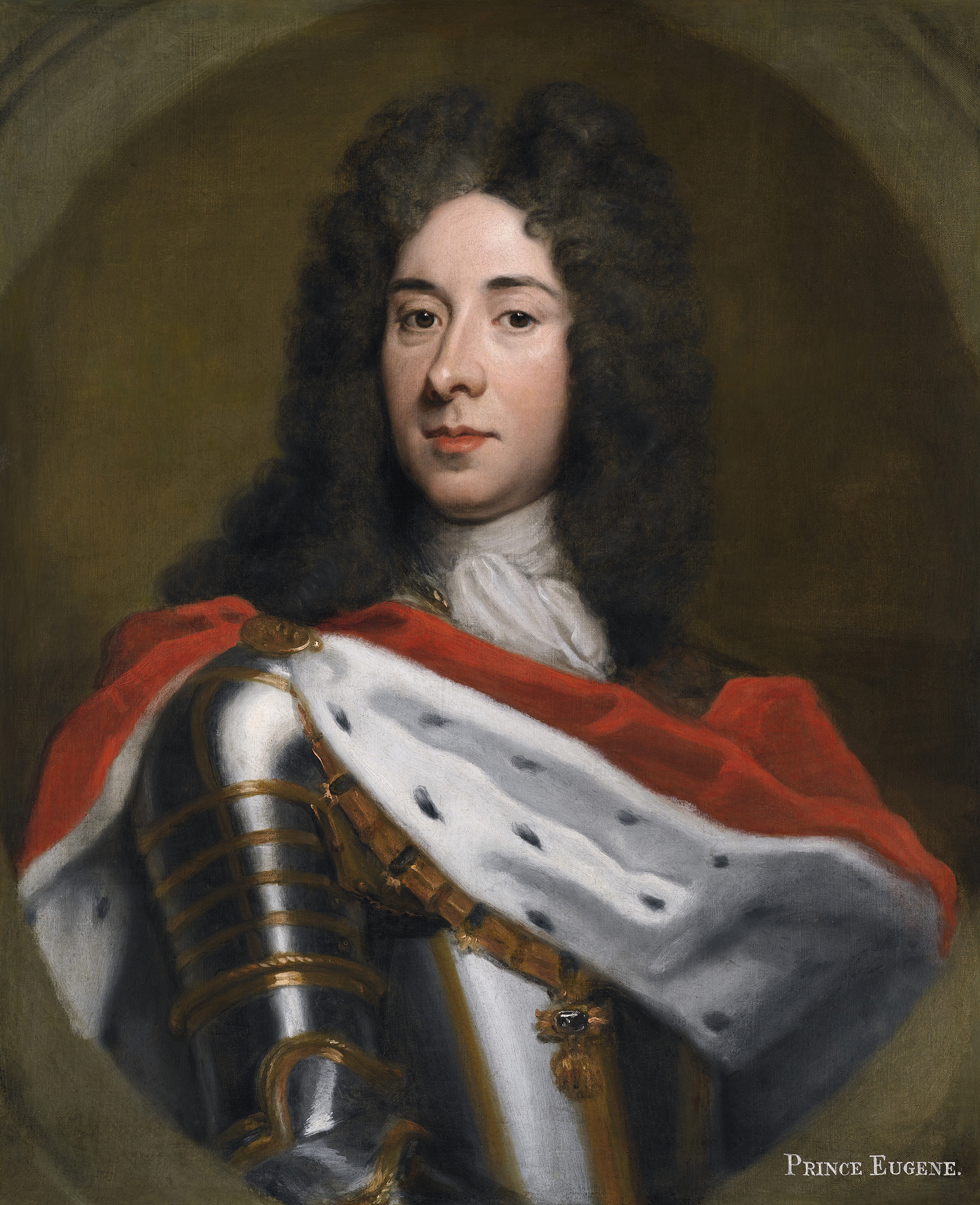
Eugene of Savoy

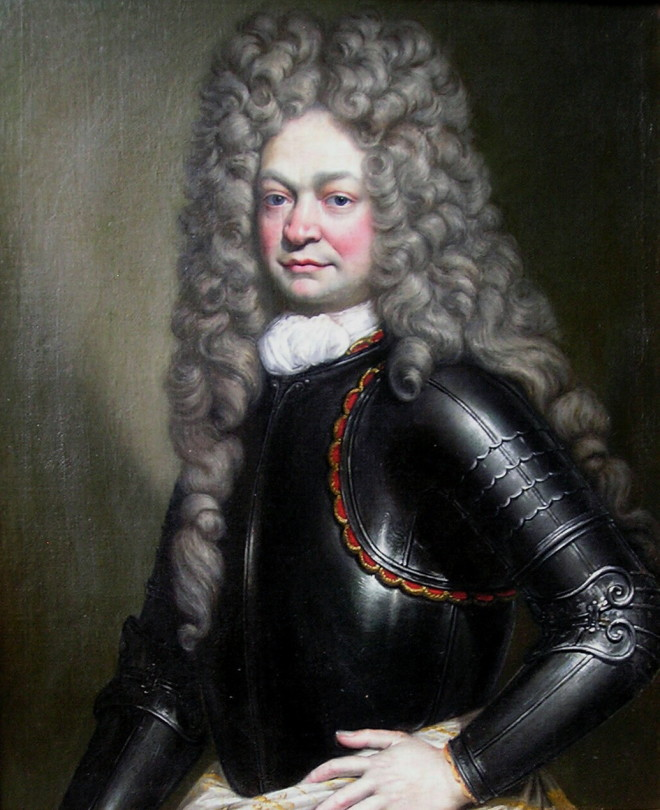
Claude Florimond de Mercy

- Pippo Spano (1369–1426), condottiero and merchant; ispán of Temes County between 1404 and 1424
- János Hunyadi (1407–1456), general and governor of Hungary; ispán of Temes County from 1441
- Pál Kinizsi (1432–1494), general; ispán of Temes County between 1478 and 1494
- György Dózsa (1470–1514), nobleman, soldier of fortune and leader of the Dózsa Rebellion of 1514; he was tortured and executed after unsuccessfully attempting to besiege the Timișoara Fortress
- Sava Temišvarac (fl. 1594–1612), vojvoda
- Eugene of Savoy (1663–1736), field marshal; liberator of Timișoara from the Ottoman occupation (1716)
- Claude Florimond de Mercy (1666–1734), field marshal; first governor of the Banat of Temeswar
- Ernő Kiss (1799–1849), lieutenant general and one of the 13 Martyrs of Arad
- György Klapka (1820–1892), general
- Hermann Kövess von Kövessháza (1854–1924), last commander-in-chief of the Austro-Hungarian Army
- Theodore Maly (1894–1938), priest and intelligence officer

== Politics ==
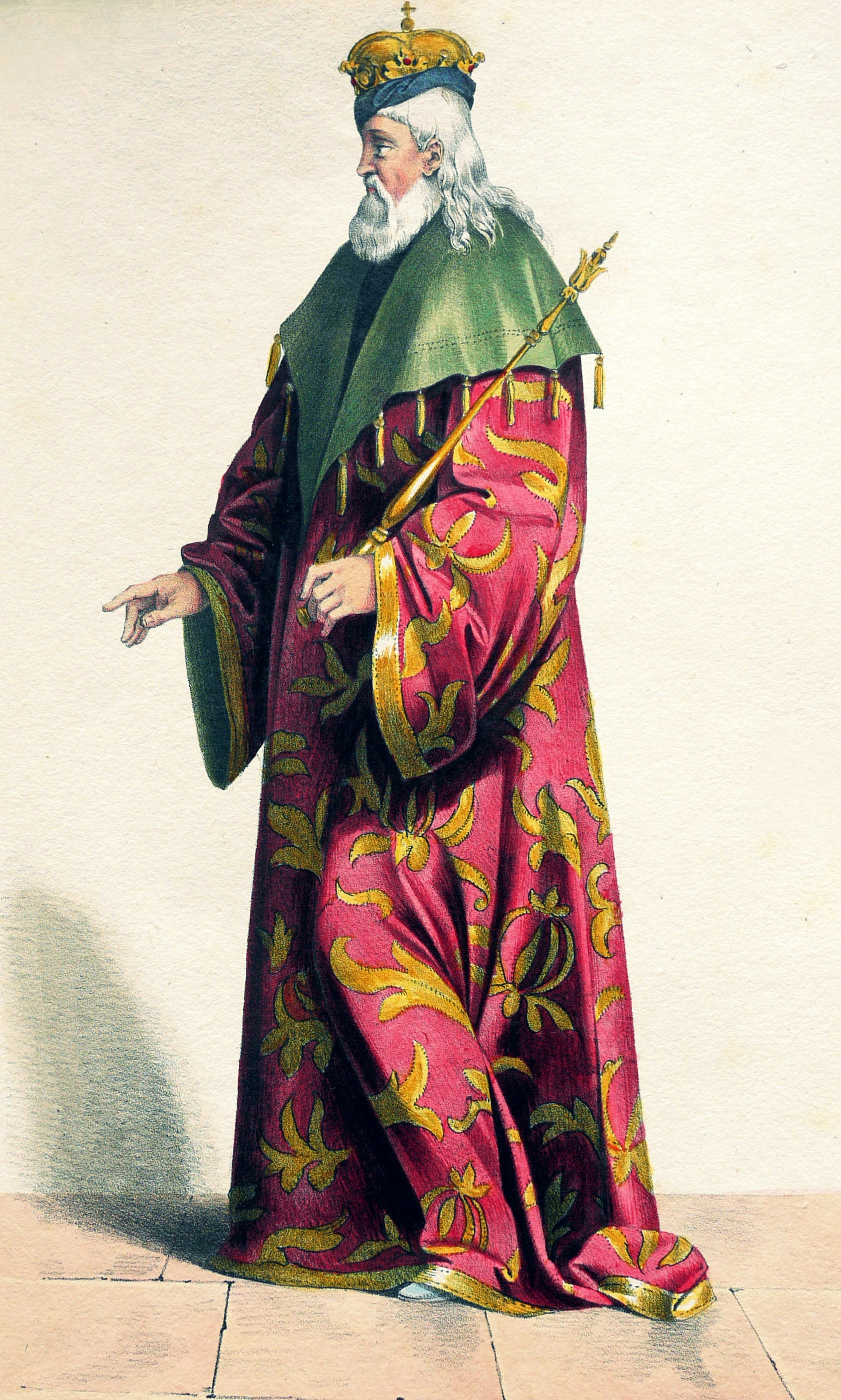
Charles I of Hungary

- Charles Robert (1288–1342), King of Hungary and Croatia; he moved his residence to Timișoara between 1316 and 1323
- Danilo Stefanović (1815–1886), Prime Minister of Serbia
- Vincențiu Babeș (1821–1907), lawyer, teacher, publicist and politician; he attended the German-language high school in Timișoara
- Fedor Nikolić (1836–1903), Civil Governor of Bosnia and Herzegovina, member of the Hungarian House of Magnates
- Carol Telbisz (1853–1914), lawyer, mayor of Timișoara and advisor to the Hungarian Royal Court
- Lucian Georgevici (1875–1940), lawyer and mayor of Timișoara
- Karl Leopold von Möller (1876–1943), writer and mayor of Timișoara
- Ferenc Marschall (1887–1970), politician
- Sorin Bottez (1930–2009), philologist, politician and diplomat
- Michael Harish (b. 1936), politician
- Viorel Oancea (b. 1944), major general and mayor of Timișoara
- Gheorghe Ciuhandu (b. 1947), building engineer and mayor of Timișoara
- Mona Muscă (b. 1949), philologist and politician; she attended the University of Timișoara
- Anton Anton (b. 1949), engineer and politician
- Nicolae Robu (b. 1955), computer scientist and mayor of Timișoara
- Slavoliub Adnagi (b. 1965), politician
- Marius Lazurca (b. 1971), diplomat
- Dan Mihalache (b. 1971), politician and diplomat
- Mihai-Bogdan Negoescu (b. 1977), politician and entrepreneur
- Ramona Pop (b. 1977), politician
- Dominic Fritz (b. 1983), conductor and mayor of Timișoara
- Raimond Scheirich (b. 1990), politician

== Scholars ==
- Alfred von Domaszewski (1856–1927), historian
- Gyula Pikler (1864–1937), philosopher of law
- Arnold Hauser (1892–1978), art historian and sociologist
- Károly Kerényi (1897–1973), philologist and father of Greek mythology studies
- George Călinescu (1899–1965), literary critic and historian, writer, publicist and academician; he taught at the C.D. Loga High School in Timișoara
- Viorel Cosma (1923–2017), musicologist, lexicographer, music critic and teacher
- Myriam Yardeni (1932–2015), historian
- Andrei Markovits (b. 1948), political scientist and sociologist

== Sciences ==
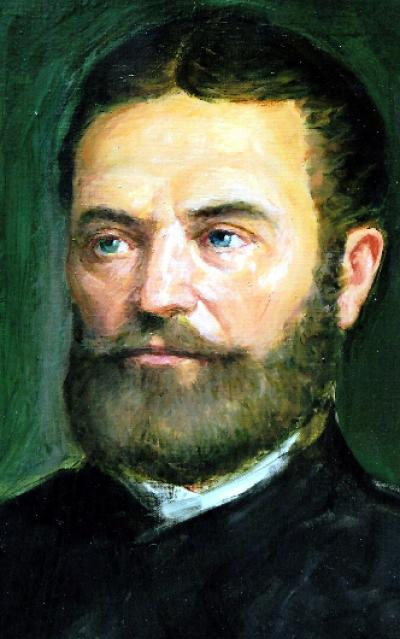
János Bolyai

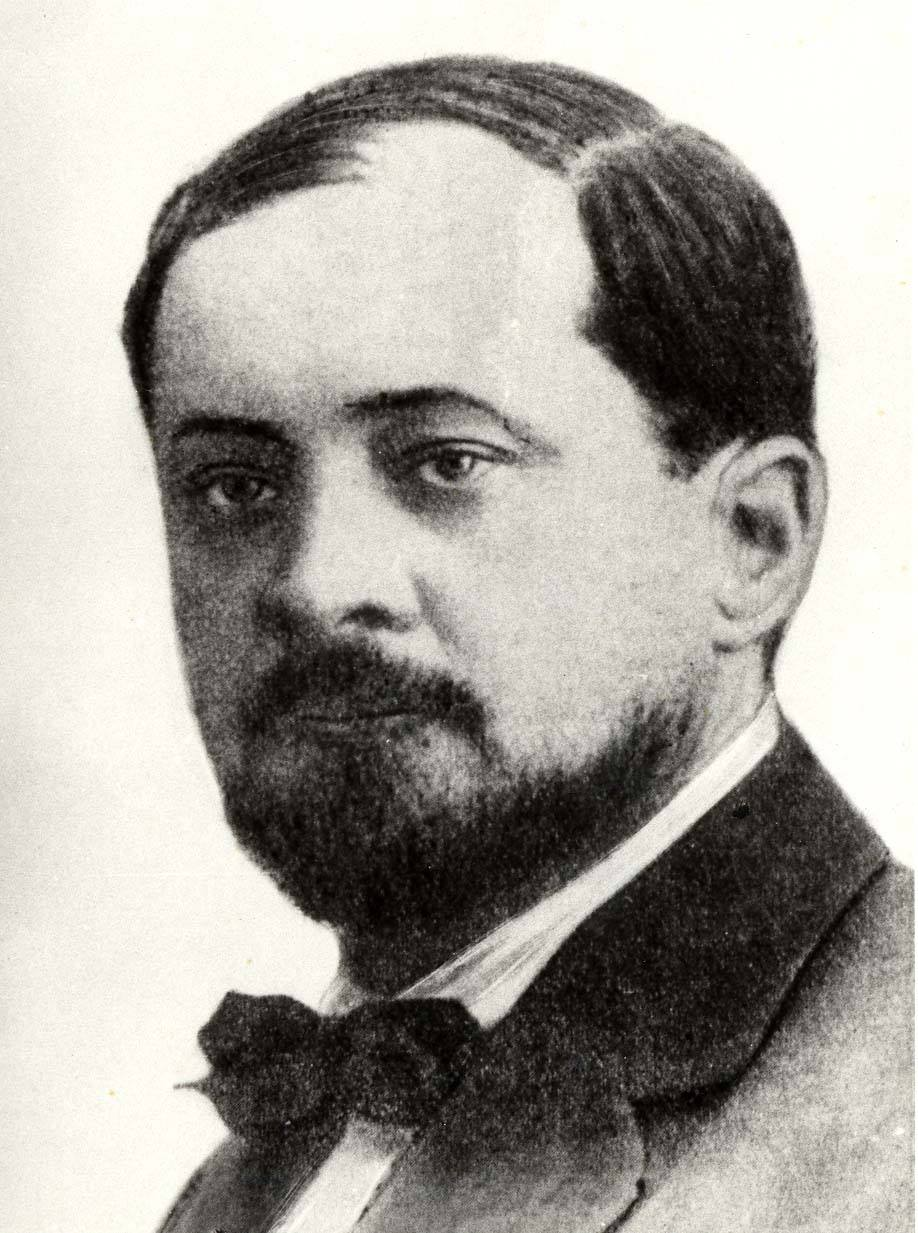
Traian Lalescu

- János Bolyai (1802–1860), mathematician and father of non-Euclidean geometry; he did his military service at the Austrian garrison in today's Liberty Square
- Pavel Vasici-Ungureanu (1806–1881), physician
- Traian Lalescu (1882–1929), mathematician; he taught at the Polytechnic Institute of Timișoara
- Dimitrie Leonida (1883–1965), energy engineer; he taught at the Polytechnic Institute of Timișoara
- Jovan Hadži (1884–1972), zoologist
- Victor Vâlcovici (1885–1970), mechanician and mathematician; he taught at the Polytechnic Institute of Timișoara
- Constantin Cândea (1887–1971), chemist; he worked in Timișoara
- Constantin C. Teodorescu (1892–1972), engineer; he taught at the Polytechnic Institute of Timisoara
- Constantin Dinculescu (1898–1990), energy engineer; he taught at the Polytechnic Institute of Timișoara
- Remus Răduleț (1904–1984), electrical engineer; he attended the Polytechnic Institute of Timișoara
- Ioan Vlădea (1907–1976), engineer; he studied and taught at the Polytechnic Institute of Timișoara
- Constantin Avram (1911–1987), structural engineer; he lived in Timișoara
- Caius Iacob (1912–1992), mathematician; he taught at the Polytechnic Institute of Timișoara
- Erwin Ringel (1921–1994), psychiatrist, neurologist and founder of the International Association for Suicide Prevention
- Victor Mercea (1924–1987), nuclear physicist
- Marianne Fillenz (1924–2012), neuroscientist
- Zvi Laron (b. 1927), endocrinologist; he attended the Institute of Medicine of Timișoara
- Alexandru Balaban (b. 1931), chemist
- Coleta de Sabata (1935–2021), engineer; she lived in Timișoara
- Peter Freund (1936–2018), theoretical physicist
- Peter L. Hammer (1936–2006), mathematician
- Reuven Ramaty (1937–2001), astrophysicist
- Karl Fritz Lauer (1938–2018), phytopathologist and herbologist; he studied and worked in Timișoara
- Păun Otiman (b. 1942), agronomist and economist; he lives in Timișoara
- Alexandru Moisuc (b. 1942), agronomist
- Gheorghe Benga (b. 1944), physician and molecular biologist
- George Lusztig (b. 1946), mathematician
- Traian V. Chirilă (b. 1948), chemist; he studied in Timișoara
- Valeriu Tabără (b. 1949), agronomist and politician; he lives in Timișoara
- Tudor Ratiu (b. 1950), mathematician
- Adrian Ioviță (b. 1954), mathematician
- Paul Pîrșan (b. 1956), agronomist; he lives in Timișoara
- Titu Andreescu (b. 1956), mathematician
- Laura Baudis (b. 1969), particle astrophysicist
- Adrian Constantin (b. 1970), mathematician
- Cosmin Alin Popescu (b. 1974), environmental scientist; he lives in Timișoara

== Sports ==
=== Athletics ===
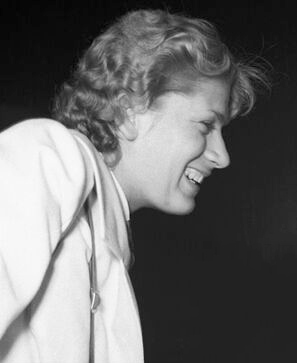
Iolanda Balaș

- Erzsébet Vígh (b. 1935), javelin thrower
- Iolanda Balaș (1936–2016), Olympic high jumper
- Alin Firfirică (b. 1995), discus thrower

=== Chess ===
- Gertrude Baumstark (1941–2020), chess player
- Sabina-Francesca Foisor (b. 1989), chess player

=== Fencing ===
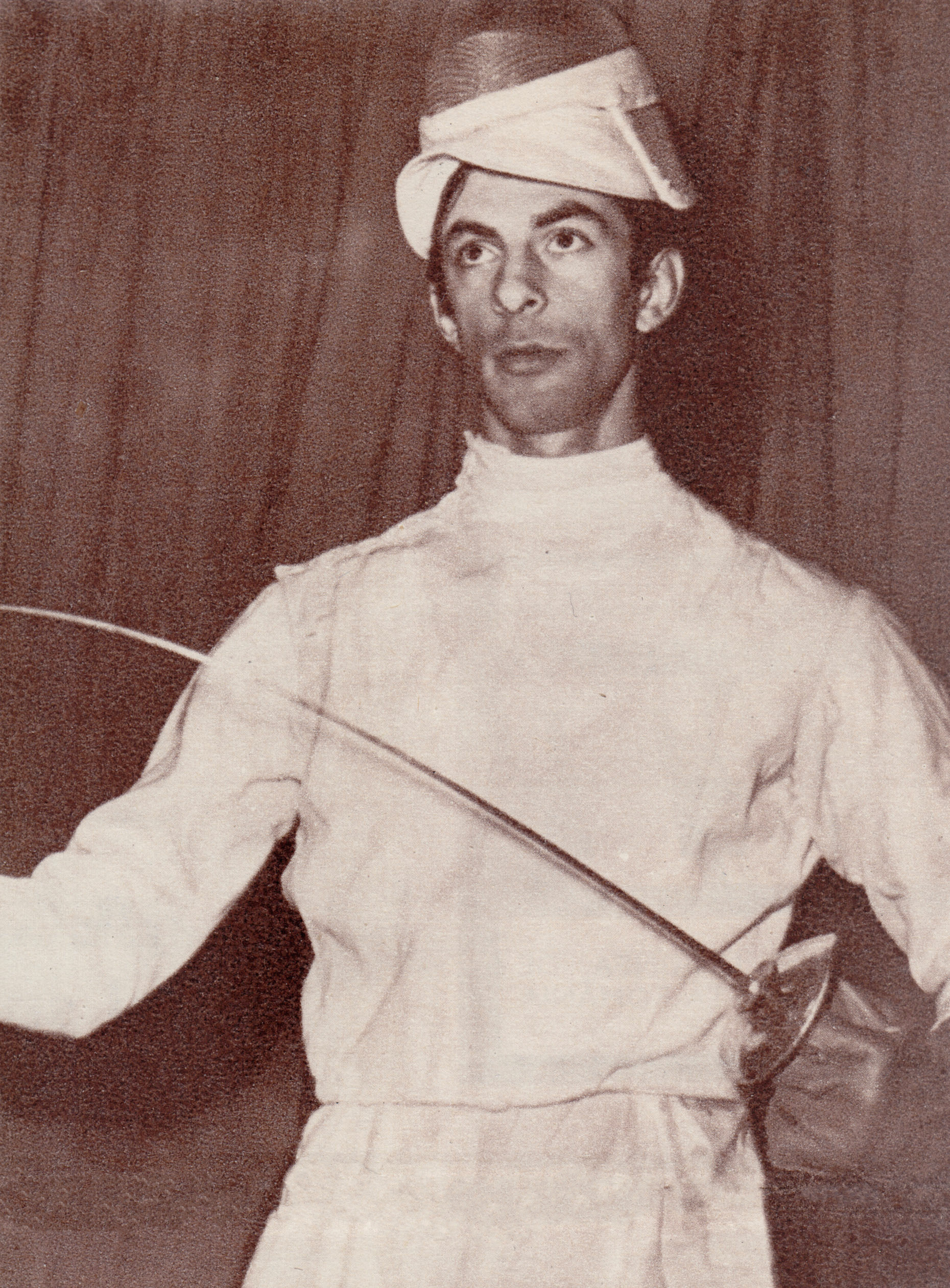
Ion Drîmbă

- Ion Drîmbă (1942–2006), Olympic fencer
- Andre Spitzer (1945–1972), fencing master and coach, one of the 11 athletes and coaches killed by terrorists in the Munich massacre

=== Football ===
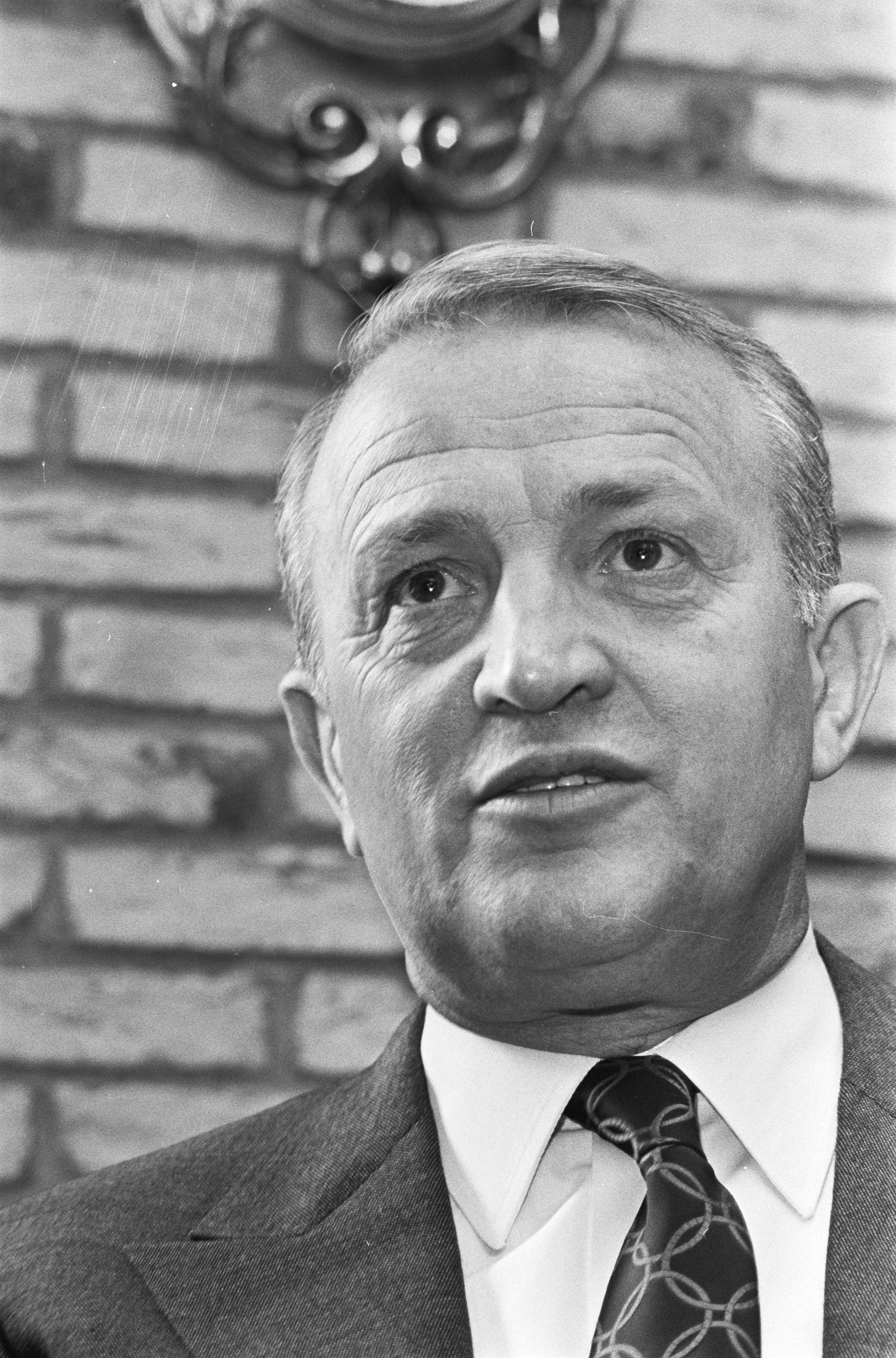
Ștefan Kovács

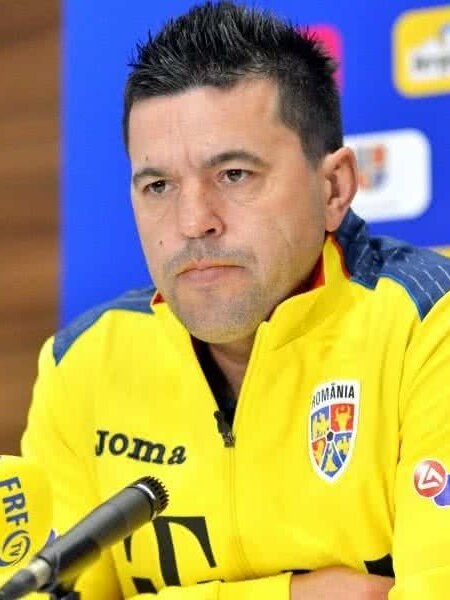
Cosmin Contra

- Rudolf Wetzer (1901–1993), football player and manager
- Samuel Zauber (1901–1986), football player
- Mihai Tänzer (1905–1993), football player
- Emerich Vogl (1905–1971), football player and coach
- Petre Steinbach (1906–1996), football player and manager
- Ilie Subășeanu (1906–1980), football player
- Vilmos Zombori (1906–1993), football goalkeeper
- Adalbert Steiner (1907–1984), football player
- Rudolf Bürger (1908–1980), football player and coach
- Elek Schwartz (1908–2000), football player and coach of the Netherlands national team; he played for CA Timișoara
- Vasile Deheleanu (1910–2003), football player and coach
- Gusztáv Juhász (1911–2003), football player and coach
- Rudolf Kotormány (1911–1983), football player and coach
- Dumitru Pavlovici (1912–1993), football goalkeeper
- Adalbert Kovács (1920–1999), football player
- Ștefan Kovács (1920–1995), football player and coach
- József Pecsovszky (1921–1968), football player
- Iosif Ritter (1921–2006), football player and referee
- Adalbert Androvits (1926–2005), football player
- Petre Bădeanțu (1929–1993), football player
- Abraham Klein (b. 1934), football referee
- Bujor Hălmăgeanu (1941–2018), football player and manager
- Alin Artimon (b. 1971), football player and manager
- Cosmin Contra (b. 1975), football player and manager
- Paul Codrea (b. 1981), football player and manager
- Alin Coțan (b. 1982), football player
- Cristian Ianu (b. 1983), football player
- János Székely (b. 1983), football player
- Srdjan Luchin (b. 1986), football player; he played for FC Politehnica Timișoara
- Zoltán Meskó (b. 1986), American football punter
- Gabriel Torje (b. 1989), football player
- Romario Benzar (b. 1992), football player
- Daniel Benzar (b. 1997), football player
- Marius Marin (b. 1998), football player

=== Gymnastics ===
- Elena Mărgărit (b. 1936), artistic gymnast
- Andreea Ulmeanu (b. 1984), artistic gymnast
- Diana Bulimar (b. 1995), artistic gymnast

=== Handball ===
- Hans Moser (b. 1937), handball player and coach
- Herbert Müller (b. 1962), handball player and coach
- Alexandru Șimicu (b. 1988), handball player
- Sabine Klimek (b. 1991), handball player

=== Mountaineering ===
- Horia Colibășanu (b. 1977), mountain climber

=== Racing ===
- Colin Kolles (b. 1967), team principal of Hispania Racing

=== Tennis ===
- Andreea Ehritt-Vanc (b. 1973), tennis player
- Adrian Cruciat (b. 1983), tennis player
- Edina Gallovits-Hall (b. 1984), tennis player
- Anca Todoni (b. 2004), tennis player

=== Water sports ===
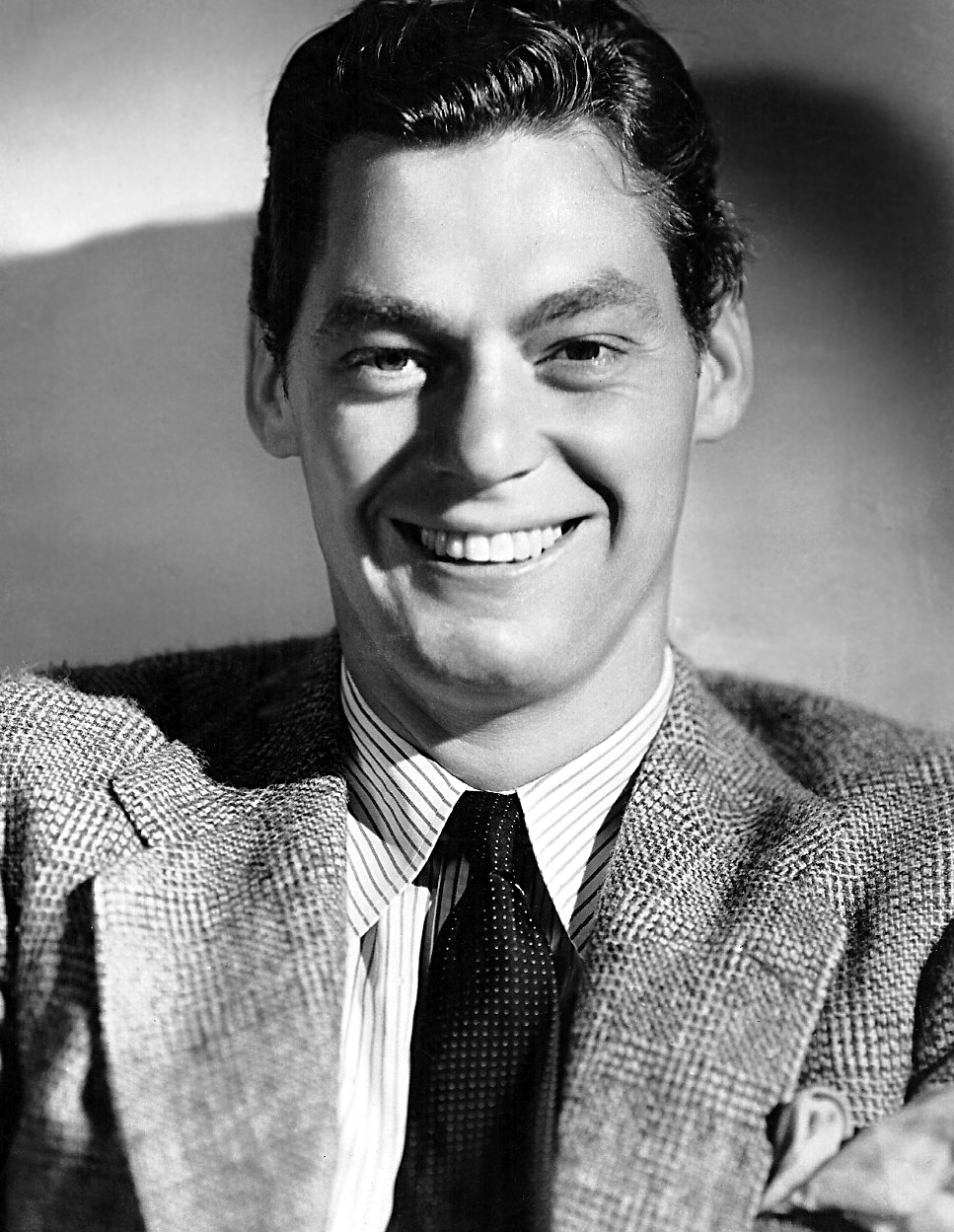
Johnny Weissmuller

- Johnny Weissmuller (1904–1984), Olympic swimmer, water polo player and actor
- Aneta Matei (b. 1948), coxswain
- Maria Micșa (b. 1953), rower
- Aurora Pleșca (b. 1963), rower
- Róbert Mike (b. 1984), sprint canoeist
