= Karl Fritz Lauer =

Romanian-German agricultural scientist

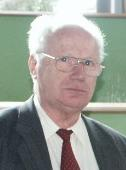
- Fritz Lauer in 2013
- Born: 11 April 1938; Săcălaz, Romania
- Died: 5 June 2018 (aged 80); Leonberg, Baden-Württemberg, Germany
- Citizenship: German, Romanian
- Education: Banat University of Agricultural Sciences and Veterinary Medicine
- Scientific career
- Fields: Agriculture, phytopathology and herbology
- Institutions: University of Regensburg; Technical University of Munich; Banat University of Agricultural Sciences and Veterinary Medicine

Karl Fritz Lauer (11 April 1938 – 5 June 2018) was a Romanian-German agricultural scientist in phytopathology and herbology.

== Biography ==
Lauer was born son of a German teacher and vice-notary in Banat, his older brother was the journalist Heinrich Lauer. Lauer started school in Vienna in 1944 during the family's flight from the ravages of war. After the war he returned to Banat and attended elementary school, then a middle school for the food industry and evening Lyceum in Timișoara where he took the final exams.

He then studied at the Agricultural University of Timișoara and qualified with a diploma in Agricultural Engineering (1965) and a doctorate of agriculture under Anghel (1974). He later worked for the Land Registry in Timișoara, completed his military service in Ploiești and worked at the Agricultural Experimental Station Lovrin.

After relocation to West Germany in 1981. He first worked as a scientist at the Botanical Institute of the University of Regensburg before taking over the management of the scientific field research for southern Germany for Rhône-Poulenc from 1983 to 1995.

In 1991, Lauer was appointed Honorary Professor for Plant Protection at the Agricultural University of Banat in Timișoara, and he also taught this subject at the Technical University of Munich in Freising. From 1996 on, he was a lecturer in Herbology at the Fachhochschule Weihenstephan and supervised Ph.D. students at Timișoara Agricultural University during their research and preparation of their dissertations, himself receiving an honorary doctorate.

Together with Păun Otiman he was an initiator of the re-opening in 2007 of the Vojteg Agricultural School, and served on its advisory board until his death. Also with the University Rectors Alexandru Moisuc (2004–2012), Paul Pirsan (2012–2016) and Cosmin Alin Popescu (since February 2016), he maintained intense relationships to build international contacts. In the European research project Biofector he was especially in the field experiments an important team member.

Lauer was married and lived with his wife in Leonberg; they had two children.

== Publications (selection) ==
- Lauer published 3 textbooks, wrote 40 documentaries on Plant Protection Agents and published more than 130 scientific treatises.
- in 1991 he was appointed Honorary Professor for Plant Protection at the Agricultural Science University of Timișoara
- in 1991 he also received an Honorary Doctorate as honoris causa of the University of Agricultural Science in Timișoara
- in 2002 he was awarded an Honorary Membership of the Academy of Agricultural Science in Bucharest
- in 2004 he received the Romanian Order of Merit as Commander

== Literature ==
- Ruxandra Ciofu (Coordinator), Nistor Stan, Victor Popescu, Pelaghia Chilom, Silviu Apahidean, Arsenie Horgos, Viorel Berar, Karl Fritz Lauer, Nicolae Atanasiu: Tratat de Legumicultura. Editura Ceres, Bucuresti 2003.
- Landwirtschaftliche Universität des Banat: Bericht 60 Jahre Agraruniversität in Temeschburg/Timișoara 2005.
- Anton Peter Petri: Biographisches Lexikon des Banater Deutschtums. Marquartstein 1992. (Karl Fritz Lauer; Seite 1004).
- Manfred G. Raupp (Hrsg.): Aktualne probleme ochrana rastlin. Sympozium Stary Smokovec (Tschechoslowakei) 1990.
