= Gârbovăț =

Gârbovăț may refer to several villages in Romania:

- Gârbovăț, a village in Bănia Commune, Caraș-Severin County
- Gârbovăț, a village in Ghidigeni Commune, Galați County
- Gârbovățu de Jos, a village in Corcova Commune, Mehedinți County
- Gârbovățu de Sus, a village in Căzănești Commune, Mehedinți County

and to:

- Gârbovăț, an alternate Romanian name for Gorbivtsi village, Terebleche Commune, Chernivtsi Oblast, Ukraine

== See also ==
- Gârbova, a commune in Alba county, Romania
