= Stepper (disambiguation) =

A stepper is a device used in the manufacture of integrated circuits.

Stepper may also refer to:

- Stepper motor, a type of electric motor
- Wilhelm Stepper, Austro-Hungarian novelist (1899 – after 1941)
- Stepper (Transformers), a fictional character
- "Stepper", a song by Latto from 777 (2022)

== See also ==
- Steppers (music), a style of reggae
- SXS or Strowger switch, an early type of stepping switch
