= Moisuc =

Moisuc is a Romanian surname. Notable people with the surname include:

- Alexandru Moisuc, Romanian agroscientist
- Viorica Moisuc, Romanian MEP
