= Baudis =

Baudis is a surname. Notable people with the surname include:

- Dominique Baudis (1947–2014), French ombudsman
- Laura Baudis (born 1969), Romanian-born German particle astrophysicist
- Pavel Baudiš (born 1960), Czech software entrepreneur, co-founder of Avast
