= Negoescu (disambiguation) =

Negoescu or Negoesco is a Romanian-language surname.

Negoescu or Negoesco may also refer to:

- Negoescu, a tributary of Vișeu, Romania
- Negoesco Stadium, Romania
