= Negoescu =

Negoescu or Negoesco is a Romanian-language surname. Notable people with the surname include:

- Claudiu Negoescu, Romanian footballer
- Cornel Negoescu, Romanian footballer, namesake of Stadionul Cornel Negoescu (now Metalul Stadium)
- Mihai-Bogdan Negoescu (born 1977), Romanian entrepreneur and politician
- Paul Negoescu (born 1984), Romanian film director
- Stephen Negoesco (1925-2019), Romanian-American soccer player
