= Șerbănești =

- Commune
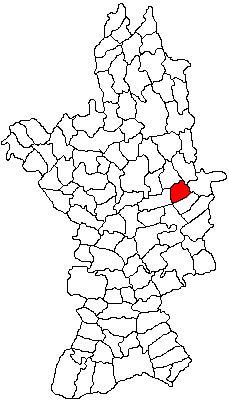
- Location in Olt County

- Location in Romania
- Coordinates: 44.3272°N 24.6936°E
- Country: Romania
- County: Olt
- Population (2021-12-01): 2,601
- Time zone: EET/EEST (UTC+2/+3)
- Vehicle reg.: OT

Șerbănești is a commune in Olt County, Muntenia, Romania. It is composed of three villages: Șerbănești, Șerbăneștii de Sus, and Strugurelu.

== Natives ==
- Paul Pîrșan
