= Bănia =

- Commune
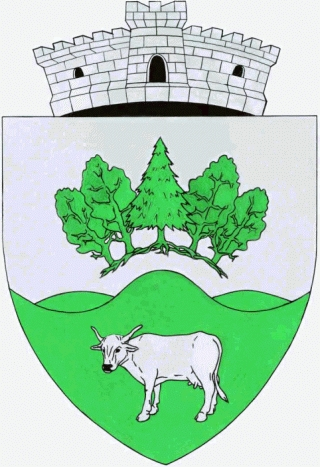
- Coat of arms

- Location in Caraș-Severin County

- Location in Romania
- Coordinates: 44°52′49″N 22°02′41″E
- Country: Romania
- County: Caraș-Severin

Government
  - Mayor (2024–2028): Alexandru-Vichentie Albu (PSD)
- Elevation: 294 m (965 ft)
- Population (2021-12-01): 1,480
- Time zone: UTC+02:00 (EET)
  - Summer (DST): UTC+03:00 (EEST)
- Postal code: 327010
- Area code: +(40) 02 55
- Vehicle reg.: CS
- Website: www.primariabania.ro

Bănia (Hungarian: Bánya) is a commune in Caraș-Severin County, western Romania, with a population of 1,480 as of 2021. It is composed of two villages, Bănia and Gârbovăț (Gerbóc).

Historical population
Year	Pop.	±%
1880	3,960	—
1910	4,259	+7.6%
1930	3,514	−17.5%
1977	2,489	−29.2%
2002	2,014	−19.1%
2011	1,752	−13.0%
2021	1,480	−15.5%
Source: Census data

== Natives ==
- Păun Otiman (born 1942), agricultural scientist and economist, academic, and politician
