= Bogdan Achimescu =

Polish and Romanian visual artist (born 1965)

Bogdan Achimescu (born 1965 in Timișoara) is a Polish and Romanian visual artist. His work mainly consists of drawings and installations. It explores themes of genetic inheritance, political dystopia and, more recently, imaginary architecture and artifacts.

Through his images, Achimescu "elaborates on human identity through its absence" and mocks established values from a humorous perspective rooted in his nomadic biography. Achimescu represented Romania at the 2001 Venice Biennial as a participant in the Context Network project. He collaborated with the Berlin-based Urban art group on bucharest-buchawork, an artistic project researching transition on the threshold of Romania's accession to the European Union.
