= Ingo Glass =

Sculptor

Ingo Glass (1941–2022) was a sculptor.

Ingo Glass participated with his metal art sculpture in the International Steel Sculpture Workshop and Symposium in 1987.

== Ingo Glass's art ==
- 2013 Kassak Museum, Budapest
- 2010 Haus der Kunst, Munich, Germany
- 2010 Kunsthalle Nürnberg, Germany
- 2001 Centre of Polish Sculpture, Orońsko, Poland
- 1994 Modern Art Museum Foundation, Hünfeld

== Links ==
- bio of Ingo Glass
