= Laura Baudis =

Romanian astrophysist

- Born: 29 October 1969; Timișoara
- Education: University of Heidelberg (Ph.D. in Physics)
- Occupation: Astrophysicist

Laura Baudis (1969) is a Romanian-born Swiss particle astrophysicist. She is employed as a full professor by the University of Zurich, Switzerland. Her research focuses on dark matter and neutrino physics. She is a member of the science strategy team for XENON as well as the CERN Scientific Policy Committee (2016–18) and the PSI Research Committee for Particle Physics.

== Early life, education and family ==
Baudis was born on 29 October 1969, in Timișoara, Romania. She attended the Lyceum for Mathematics and Physics, where she developed a fascination for mathematics, literature, philosophy, and architecture. After Romanian communist party leader Nicolae Ceaușescu died in 1989, her family moved to Heidelberg. She attended the Geschwister-Scholl Gymnasium in Mannheim.

She proceeded to study physics at the University of Heidelberg in 1993 and obtained her Ph.D. in 1999 ibidem.

During her studies, she worked as a research assistant at the Max Planck Institute for Nuclear Physics from 1997 to 1999. After obtaining her Ph.D., she became a postdoctoral fellow at the department of physics at Stanford University from 2000 to 2003. She was appointed assistant professor of physics at the University of Florida in 2003 and stayed there until 2006 when she became a Lichtenberg-Professor for Astroparticle Physics at RWTH-Achen. She has been a Professor for Physics at the University of Zurich since 2007.

She is married and mother of two.

== Academic career ==
During her studies at the University of Heidelberg, Baudis worked on double beta decay and the detection of Weakly interacting massive particles (WIMPs). In particular, she investigated how neutrinoless double-beta decay could be used in the search for dark matter. She participated in the Cryogenic Dark Matter Search, a collaboration that aimed to detect dark matter in the form of WIMPs. Since 2004, she has contributed to the XENON dark matter research project, which uses a chamber filled with liquid xenon to detect particle interactions. As part of the XENON project, she studied the technical limitations of current detection methods, with an emphasis on improving the sensitivity of direct dark matter detectors. These efforts were continued in the DARWIN project, which involves research and development on WIMP detectors. Like XENON, the DARWIN project aims to increase the sensitivity of liquid xenon detectors until they have a realistic chance of detecting and studying dark matter.

In 2011 at the international symposium on subnuclear physics held in Vatican City, she gave a talk Results from the XENON100 Dark Matter Search Experiment.

== Awards and positions ==
From 1997 until 1999, Baudis held a fellowship of the research training group at the University of Heidelberg for "Experimental methods in nuclear and particle physics". In 2005, she received the NSF Career Award. In 2006, she was awarded a Lichtenberg Professorship by the Volkswagen foundation. In 2013, she was offered a Canada Excellence Research Chair at Queens University, which she declined. The American Physical Society (APS) named her a Fellow in 2015 "for leadership and outstanding contributions to experimental searches for astrophysical dark matter by direct detection and for double beta decay". In 2017, Baudis received an Advanced Grant from the European Research Council for her project concerning a multi-ton xenon observatory for particle astrophysics. The Advanced Grant supported Baudis's project with over 3 million euros. Since 2019, she has held a Visiting Miller Professorship at the University of California, Berkeley. In 2022, Baudis was awarded the Charpak-Ritz Prize by the French and Swiss Physical Society.

Baudis has been a member of the CERN Science Policy Committee and editor-in-chief of the European Physical Journal C. She is a member of the KIT Center for Elementary Particle and Astroparticle Physics (KCETA) advisory board, the Astroparticle Physics European Consortium's scientific advisory committee, and was on the scientific advisory committee of the Technical University of Munich's Excellence Cluster. She has been a co-spokesperson for the XENON Experiment, and is the founder and spokesperson of the DARWIN project and was on the University of Zurich's Graduate Campus Board.
