= Alexandru Moisuc =

Romanian agricultural scientist

Alexandru Moisuc (born 22 September 1942, in Timișoara) is a Romanian agricultural scientist, University Professor and Rector of the Banat University of Agronomical Sciences and Veterinary Medicine (USABTM) 2004–2012.

His education started in primary school, followed by the Constantin Diaconovici Loga Lyzeum Timișoara. In 1959 he started his academic studies at the Polytechnic University of Timișoara and completed them with the degree Dipl. Ing agr. in 1965. He prepared his dissertation "Genmutation of Wheat" as scientific assistant at the ‘’Agricultural Institute Timișoara’’. After his conferral of a doctorate in agriculture ( Dr. agr) he became university lecturer (1977) and after his postdoctoral lecture qualification he became professor of agronomy (1992).

Moisuc has published 28 books, 250 scientific and popular science articles and 25 publications in international science journals. He participated in more than 20 agricultural research projects, mostly as the project leader.

Moisuc became vice president of the Agronomic Faculty (1978), senator of the university (1982), vice dean and dean of the Agro Faculty (1991–2004). In 2004 he was elected and 2008 reelected as rector of the USABTM. In January 2012 he retired as rector.

Moisuc is married to Ute Moisuc née Wagner. They have an adult daughter.

== Memberships and honorary degrees ==
- Member of the Romanian Society of Biology (since 1990)
- Member of the Society of Biotechnology – Artificial Fertilication (since 1992)
- President of the Romanien Gheorghe Ionescu - Şişeşti Trust (1994–2002)
- Associated Member of the Romanian Academie of Agricultural and Forest Science; Gheorghe Ionescu – Şişeşti (seit 2001)
- Honorary Member of the Association for Feedproduction in Serbia and Montenegro (since 2004)
- Doctor honoris causa of the Vasile Goldiş West University of Arad (2007)
- Agricultural Order of Merit (2007)
- Excellenze Diploma of several Romanian institutions.
