= Mihai-Bogdan Negoescu =

Romanian entrepreneur and politician (born 1977)

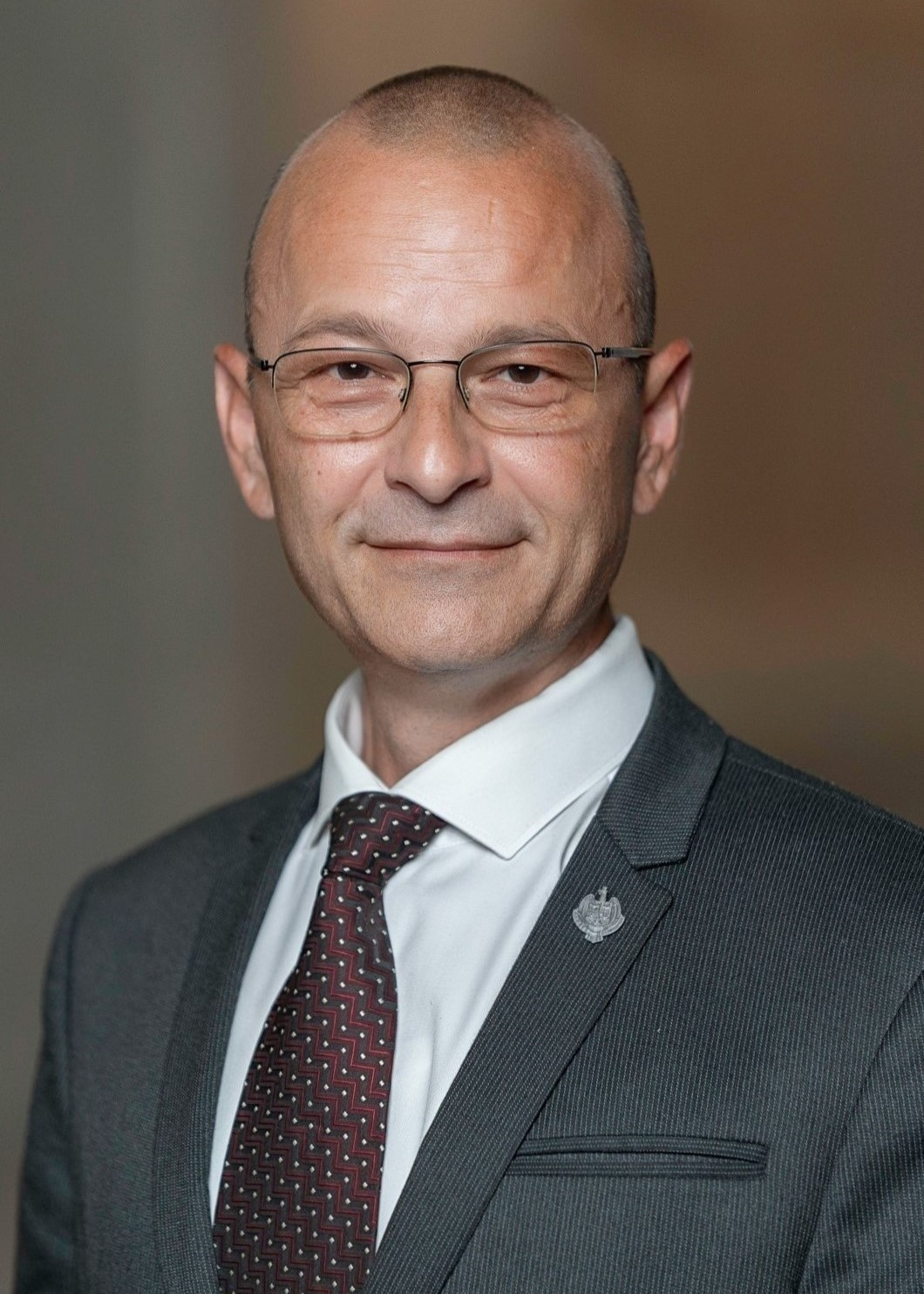
- Negoescu in 2025

Member of the Chamber of Deputies
- Incumbent
- Assumed office 21 December 2024
- Constituency: Timiș County

Personal details
- Born: 9 April 1977 (age 49) Timișoara, Socialist Romania
- Party: Alliance for the Union of Romanians (since 2019)
- Education: Constantin Diaconovici Loga National College; West University of Timișoara
- Occupation: Entrepreneur • Politician

Mihai-Bogdan Negoescu (born 9 April 1977) is a Romanian entrepreneur and politician who since 2024 has served as a member of the Chamber of Deputies for the Alliance for the Union of Romanians (AUR) party. Before entering politics, Negoescu worked in Romania's agricultural sector.

== Early life and education ==
Mihai-Bogdan Negoescu was born on 9 April 1977 in Timișoara, the capital of Timiș County, in the Socialist Republic of Romania. His father, Nicolae Negoescu (d. 2000), was a mathematics teacher and, in the late 1990s, served as president of the Timiș branch of the Greater Romania Party (PRM) led by Corneliu Vadim Tudor.

From 1991 to 1995, Negoescu attended the Constantin Diaconovici Loga National College in Timișoara, graduating as valedictorian with a 9.94 GPA and a perfect 10 on the baccalaureate exam. He went on to study at the Faculty of Economic Sciences (Finance and Insurance) at the West University of Timișoara from 1995 to 1999, where he again graduated with a 9.79 GPA and a 10 on his licensing exam.

Between 2000 and 2002, he completed postgraduate studies at the same university, earning a master’s degree in economic policy. In addition to his native Romanian, he speaks fluent English and has working knowledge of German and French.

== Professional career ==
Before entering politics, Negoescu pursued a career in the Romania agricultural sector. In July 2009, he inaugurated Timiș County's first fresh-milk vending machine. In February 2010, he launched the JOIANA, an automated sales solution aimed at increasing market visibility for small producers.

In October 2011, under his coordination, Timișoara saw the installation of Romania's first egg vending machine. In October 2015, he expanded the model by deploying three additional milk vending machines sourcing directly from his own farm in Arad County, reducing farmers' reliance on traditional distribution channels.

== Political career ==
Negoescu joined the newly founded Alliance for the Union of Romanians (AUR), led by civic activist George Simion, at the end of 2019, having not previously been affiliated with any political party. In the 2024 local elections on 9 June, he was elected to the Timiș County Council with his term effective from 4 November of that year.

=== Member of the Chamber of Deputies (2024–present) ===
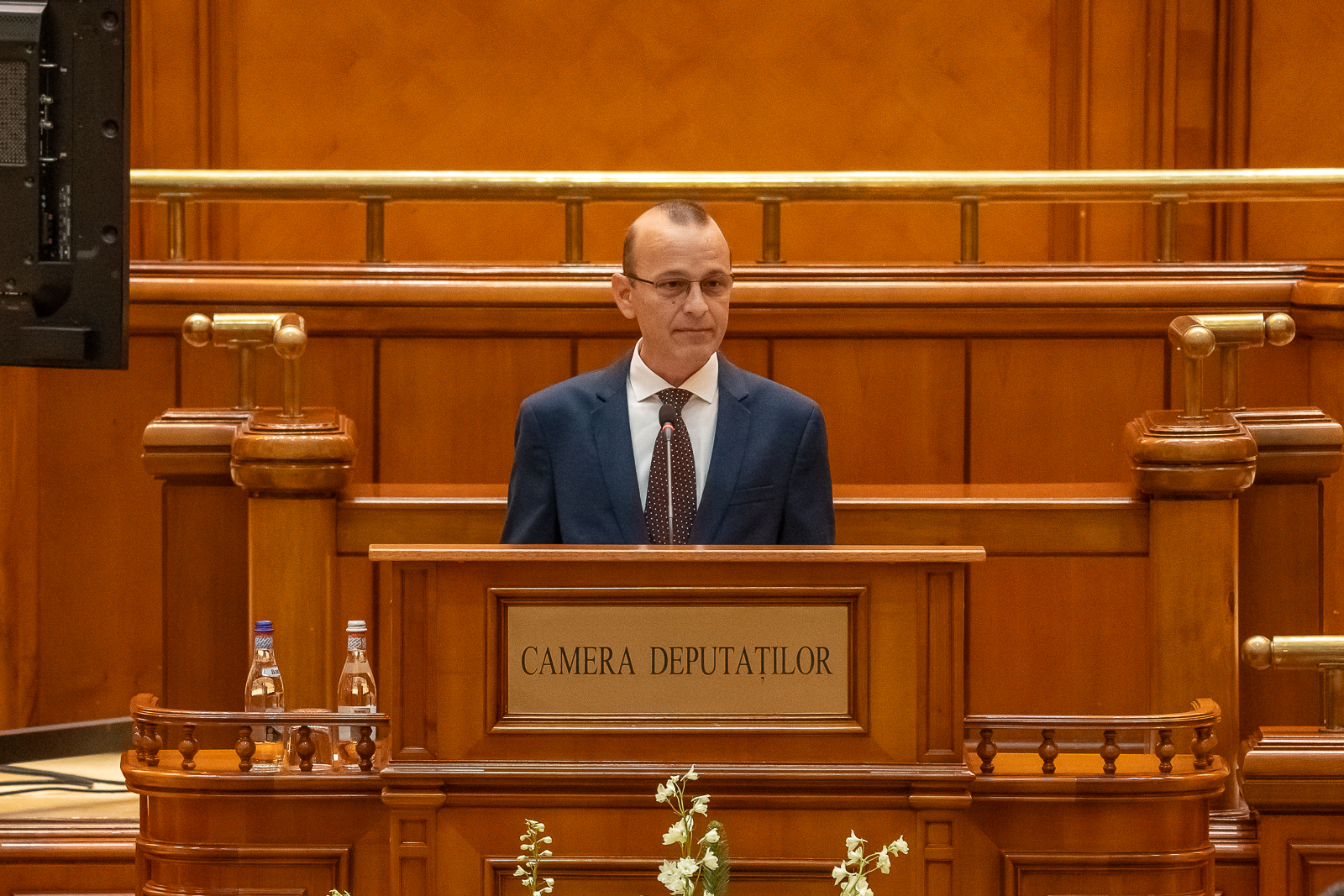
Negoescu taking the oath of office, 21 December 2024

In the 2024 parliamentary election on 1 December, Negoescu was elected a member of the Chamber of Deputies for the AUR in Timiș County, assuming office o 21 December.

As a deputy, he serves as secretary of the AUR parliamentary group and sits on the Committee for Economic Policy, Reform and Privatisation as well as the Committee for Labour and Social Protection. He also serves on the parliamentary friendship groups with Austria and Ecuador, being the chairman of the latter. In March 2025, he participated in a protest in support of Călin Georgescu following the annulment of the December 2024 presidential election due to accusations of Russian interference.

As of August 2025, Negoescu had submitted four written political declarations, initiated ten legislative proposals, one draft decision, and three motions.
