= Păun Otiman =

Romanian agricultural scientist and economist

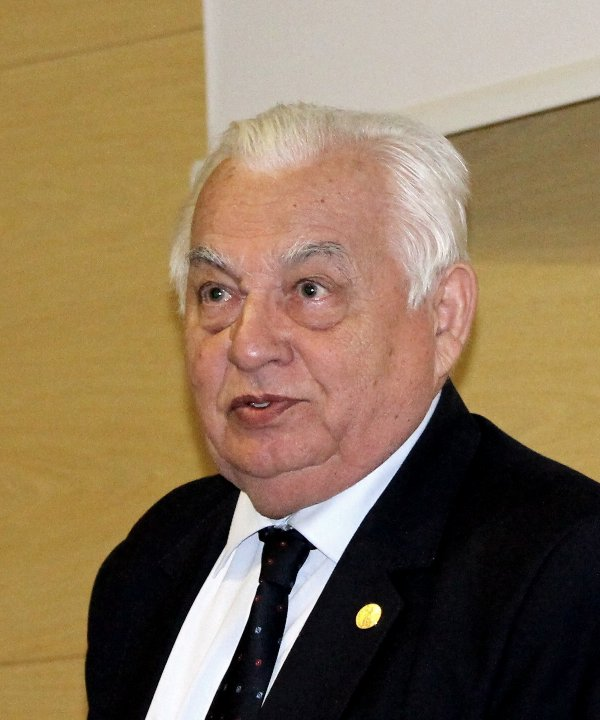
Păun Otiman, 2017

Păun Ion Otiman (born 28 May 1942) is a Romanian agricultural scientist and economist, University Professor, member of the Romanian Academy, Romanian Senator and former Rector of the Banat University of Agronomical Sciences and Veterinary Medicine.

== Biography ==
He was born in 1942 in Gârbovăț, Caraș-Severin County. In 1960 he started his academic studies at the Agronomy Faculty in Timișoara (Dipl. Ing. agr. 1965), followed by the Economical Sciences Faculty and studies at the Agricultural Economy Faculty in Bucharest, obtaining a Ph.D. in Management.

He became Assistant (1969), Lecturer (1971), Assistant Professor (1978) and Professor and Rector (1990) of the Banat's University of Agricultural Sciences and Veterinary Medicine, where he taught Management, Rural Economy, Rural Development, Economical Cybernetics, and Informational Systems. He was both senator of the Romanian Parliament and president of national commissions.

Otiman is married with Diana Otimanș they have an adult son.

== Fields of Research ==
- Technical and economical optimisation of agricultural processes
- Mathematical modelling of agricultural processes
- Economical analysis
- Rural Economy and Policy

== Memberships ==
- Member in the Publishing Board of the Revue "Forum" (1990–2008)
- Founding Director of the Revue "Agricultura Banatului" (1993–2008)
- Member in the Publishing Board of the Revue "Profitul agricol" (1998–2007)
- Honour Director of the Revue "Vatră nouă" (2000–2008)
- Member of the Publishing Board of the "Revue of Science Policy and Scientometry" (2002–2008)
- Member in the Publishing Board of Proceedings of the Romanian Academy, Series B: Chemistry, Life sciences and geosciences (2002–2005)
- Director of the Revue "Economy and Rural Development" (2008)
- Director and tam member in numerous Romanian and European research projects in Agricultural Reforms. Published 14 Books and more than 250 scientific papers in Romania and abroad.

== Management Positions ==
- Rector of the Banat's University of Agricultural Sciences and Veterinary Medicine Timișoara (1990–2004).
- Vice-President of the National Council of Rectors (2000–2004)
- President of the Board for Competitive Grant Schemes of World Bank in the field of Scientific Research and Consultancy in Agriculture (1998–2000).
- President of the National Council for Ethics (2004–2008)
- President of the Timișoara Branch of the Romanian Academy (2004–2006)
- General Secretary of the Romanian Academy (2006–2008)
- Director of the Institute for Agricultural Economics of the Romanian Academy (2008)

== Political activities ==
- Member in the Temporary National Union County Council (CPUN) (1990)
- Senator CDR/Democratic Convention of Romania (PAC/Civic Alliance Party) of Timiș County (1992–1996);
- Senator PNL/National Liberal Party of Timiș County (2000–2004)
- President of the Commission for Education and Science in the Romanian Senate (2000–2004)

== Honorary Degrees ==
- "Ion Ionescu de la Brad" Prize of the Romanian Academy in 1990 for the book "Optimisation of the Agricultural Production" (Facla Publishing House, 1987).
- OPERA OMNIA Prize of the Ministry of national Education in 2000, for the entire scientific activity.
- Honour Citizen of Philadelphia City – Mississippi USA (1993)
- Doctor Honoris Causa of the University of Agricultural Sciences and Veterinary Medicine Bucharest (2002)
- Doctor Honoris causa of the University Cluj-Napoca
- Honour Citizen the origin village Bănia, Caraș-Severin County (2004)

== Publications ==
- Păun Ion Otiman: Agronomia Banatica Sau Dorinta de a Fauri Retrospectiva 1989–2006 Perspectiva 2015–2013, Bukarest und Timișoara 2015 ISBN 978-973-27-2538-2 und ISBN 978-973-108-632-3
