= Meir Amigo =

18th-century Sephardi Jewish community leader in Temesvár

- Born: Constantinople, Ottoman Empire
- Occupation(s): Community leader; diplomatic intermediary
- Known for: Influencing the repeal of the 1745 expulsion of Jews from Bohemia

Meir Amigo was Sephardi Jew who lived in the second half of the eighteenth century at Temesvár, Hungary. He was nicknamed El rey chico ('the little king') on account of his wealth, and was highly respected at the court of Maria Theresa.

== Biography ==
Amigo was born in Constantinople, and settled in Temesvár with a number of other Sephardi families in 1736, where he became leader of the city's Jewish community.

At Constantinople he had many connections, and was an intimate friend of Diego d'Aguilar. Amigo maintained contacts between his community and the Sephardi community in Vienna. When, through private sources, Aguilar learned of the imminent expulsion of the Jews from Bohemia in 1745, he wrote to Amigo asking the latter to go to Constantinople and bring his influence to bear in favour of his threatened coreligionists. Amigo went, and succeeded in persuading the sultan to send an envoy with an autograph letter to the empress. By this means she was induced to repeal the decree of expulsion.

His descendants continued to be prominent in the Jewish community of Hungary until the early 19th century.
