= Paul Pîrșan =

Romanian agricultural scientist

Paul Pîrşan (born February 28, 1956, in Șerbănești) is a Romanian agricultural scientist, university professor and rector of the Banat University of Agricultural Sciences and Veterinary Medicine (USABTM).

== Biography ==
After his academic studies Pîrşan managed the agricultural farm in the Recaș area of Timiș County. In 1986 he started as scientific assistant at the Agricultural Institute Timișoara. After his conferral of a doctorate in agriculture ( Dr. agr) he became university lecturer (1992) and after his postdoctoral lecture qualification he became Lecturer (1996) and professor of agronomy (2003). He participated in five agricultural research projects, mostly as the project leader. Pîrşan became director of the agricultural institut and Dean of the Agronomic Faculty (2005–2012), County Councillor and Chairman of the Culture Committee of the Timiș County Council since 2005. Pîrşan was elected rector of the USAB-TM in 2012.

== Research projects ==
- Project: Project Director; CNCSIS; Developing technology for growing maize farming in specific system (plant carpet) in plain west of the country, 2002–2004
- Project: Program Pandoer; International contract in collaboration with Ghent University, Belgium Government financing; Technology for corn crop, 2004–2006
- Project: Project Director; Program Agral; Research and development of innovative technologies for harvesting and ensilage of green fodder plants to improve nutritional quality of food and animal health, 2006–2008
- Project: Project Director; CEEX; Sustainable Recovery of medicinal herbs and hops to obtain the active biopreparate, 2006–2008
- Project: Project Director; Program IDEI; Research, foundation and development of cultivation technology for maize and sunflower grown in organic system 2009–2011
- Expert reviewer on 15 doctoral theses (2005–2012)

== Memberships and honorary degrees ==
- General Association of Engineers of Romania
- Multi-disciplinary Research Association of West
- General Horticulturists Association
- Visiting Professor to support lectures in the Faculty of Agriculture in Novi Sad and Banja Luka
- Lecturer in MAKIS Program – World Bank
- Supporter in the Office of Agricultural Consultants in Arad and Timis
- Head Training Agency Timis, supporting training courses to professionals of these institutions in agricultural technology
- Honorary member of the Chamber of Commerce and Industry, Timis
- Agricultural Order of Merit (2006)
- Excellenze Diploma of the Romanian Soil Research Association (2005)
