= Geschwister-Scholl-Gymnasium Ludwigshafen =

Coordinates: 49°28′24″N 8°27′09″E

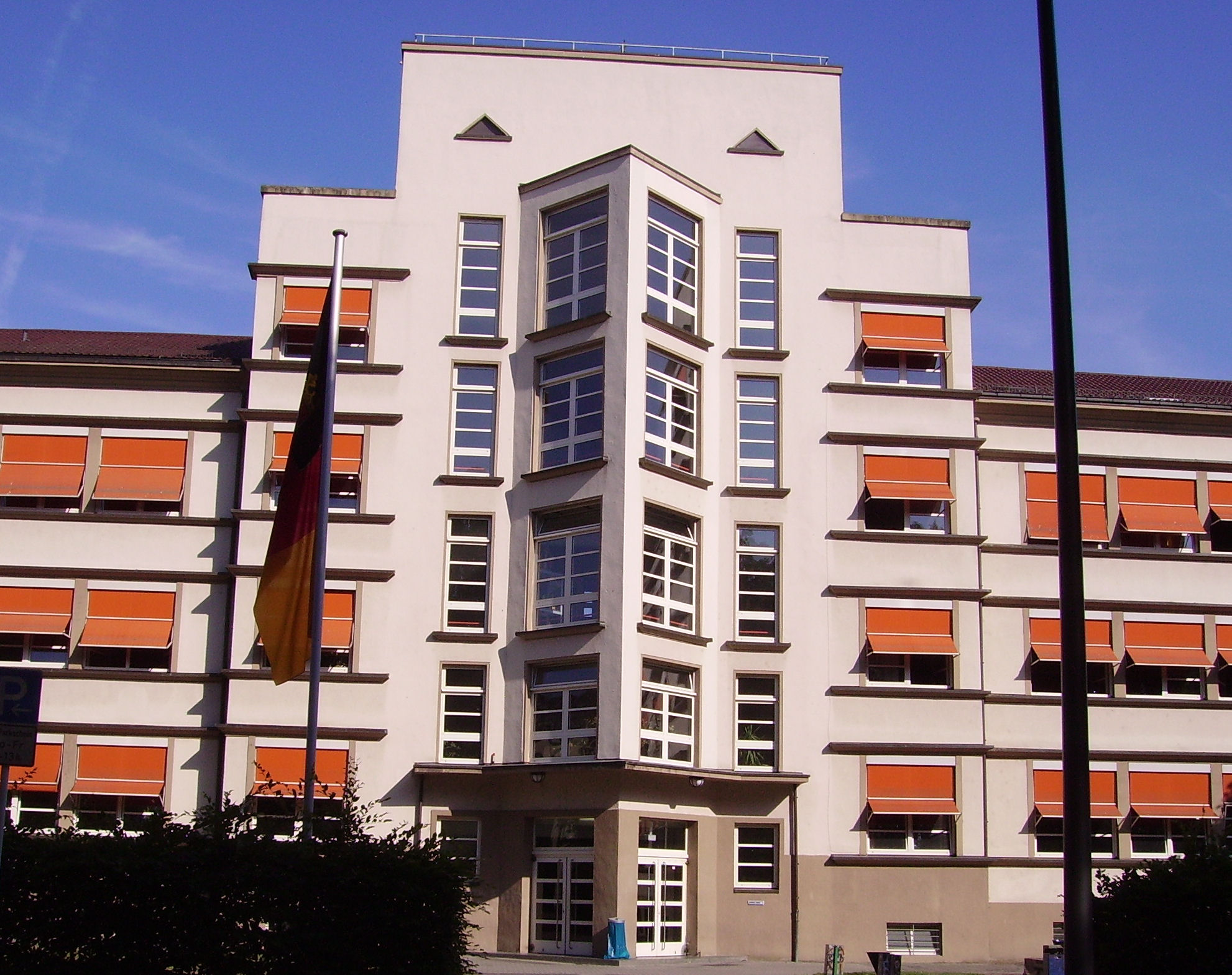

The Geschwister-Scholl-Gymnasium (GSG) in Ludwigshafen, Germany, is a high school established in 1875 and was originally a girls' school. It is named after Hans and Sophie Scholl.

== Subjects ==
Students learn English, German as a first language, mathematics, biology, chemistry, physics, music, religious education, French and art.
