= Wilhelm Stepper-Tristis =

Austro-Hungarian, Hungarian and Romanian novelist, journalist and literary critic

Wilhelm Stepper-Tristis (born Wilhelm Stepper; his given name is also rendered as Vily, Vilmos or William; 3 September 1899 – after 1941) was an Austro-Hungarian, Hungarian and Romanian novelist, journalist, and literary critic. He wrote his works in German, Hungarian and French. A communist militant during his youth, he actively supported the Hungarian Soviet Republic, and, during the interwar period, was a prominent figure in the cultural life of Timișoara city. His first novel, Brom-Delirium, was a critically acclaimed portrayal of Bohemian lifestyles.

An anti-fascist, Stepper-Tristis traveled extensively throughout Europe, preaching pacifism and drawing support for the League of Nations. He lived for a while in France, but was mostly reduced to homelessness and vagabondage. He joined the French Resistance following the occupation of France by Nazi Germany, was captured, and probably died in a concentration camp.

== Early years ==
Born in Timișoara (known then as Temeschwar or Temesvár), Wilhelm Stepper-Tristis belonged to an old family of Jewish merchants. Soon after receiving his matura at age 18, he enrolled in the Austro-Hungarian Army and took part in World War I, being sent to the Italian Front. He fought in the Battles of the Isonzo, and specifically in the Battle of Gorizia.

== Travels ==
In 1919, in the wake of the Aster Revolution, Stepper-Tristis was in Budapest, where he became a supporter of the Communist Party of Hungary. As the Romanian Army ended the communist experiment later in the year, he moved out of the city and embarked on a lengthy and perilous voyage through regions of Central Europe. Eventually, he regained his native Timișoara, which was by then part of Greater Romania. Stepper-Tristis started work for local German- and Hungarian-language newspapers, and became known inside the community of writers and artists. He was a popular figure in the society of Timișoara, and a celebrated raconteur.

== Literary society ==
Fascinated with France, he frequently traveled there and was fully integrated into the Bohemian society of Paris. This period was the subject of Brom-Delirium (1926), which was published in Timișoara and won the praise of modernist writers in Budapest. By 1928, he was the head of a literary society (the "Artists' Club"), which grouped together intellectuals from all backgrounds—members of the German, Hungarian, Jewish and Serb communities alike.

== Activist activities ==
In 1930, Stepper-Tristis decided to permanently leave Romania and move to France. Beginning in 1933, at signs that a war was under preparation, he became an activist in support of the League of Nations. Trying to return to Romania, Stepper spent time in Fascist Italy, passing through Verona and Milan—he was arrested there after being found sleeping on the streets, lacking any income. Released soon after, he later claimed to have unsuccessfully asked the Italian authorities to escort him to the Yugoslavian border.

== Later years ==
Shortly before World War II erupted, he was again imprisoned in Nice for a duration of 30 days—it was then that he authored his second novel, Mon espace vital. The volume was an account of his years as a drifter, and was published soon after in Paris. After the fall of France, Stepper-Tristis joined the Resistance. As the novel shows, he was romantically involved with a Frenchwoman named Clémence, who had promised to wait for him to be set free.

Little is known about his life after that point, but it is clear that, in 1941, he was captured by the Gestapo at a train station in Lyon. He was soon after sent to a concentration camp. No proof of his death was found.

Stepper's work was ignored in post-war Romania, although texts by him were first translated and republished in 1986 Bucharest-based magazine Secolul 20. Additional interest for his literature was raised by literary critic and West University professor Adriana Babeţi.
