= Cosmin Alin Popescu =

Romanian environmental scientist

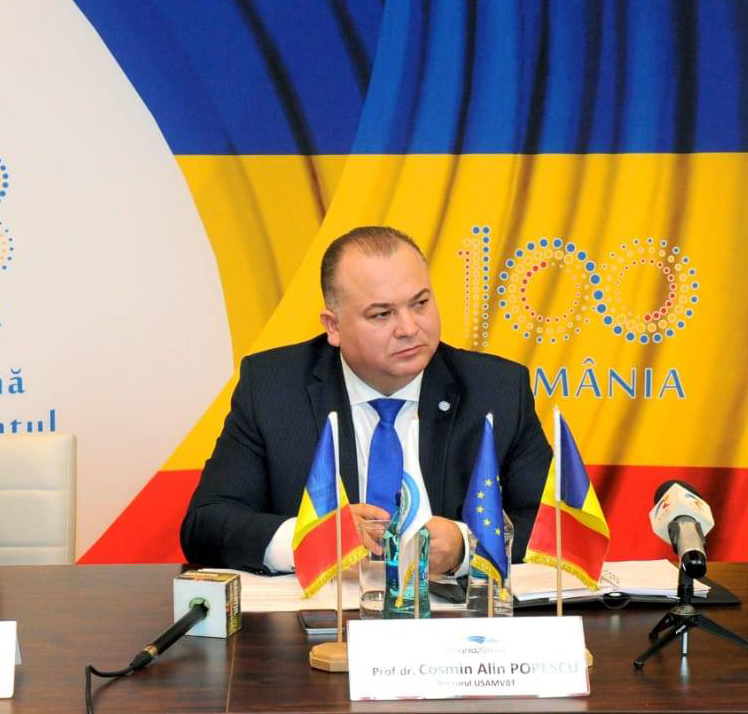
- Popescu in 2019
- Born: March 19, 1974; Babșa, Timiș County
- Citizenship: Romania
- Occupations: engineer, professor, rector

Cosmin Alin Popescu (born March 19, 1974, in Babșa, Timiș County) is a Romanian environmental scientist, University Professor and Rector of the Banat University of Agricultural Sciences and Veterinary Medicine. Professor Popescu was reelected in 2024 for another five years as rector.

== Biography ==
After leaving school Popescu studies Natural Science at the Faculty of Agriculture, specialising in environmental engineering (1998–1997). In order to deepen his knowledge of the subject he then took an internship at the University of Rennes in France studying the application of satellites to agricultural technology. There followed further qualifications in Environmental Technology and Cadastral Studies at the West University of Timișoara where he obtained a doctorate (Dr.-Ing.) and a post at the National Union of Realtors in Timișoara.

Popescu then returned to the Faculty of agriculture at Banat University with the Chair of Geodesy and Cadastry, and also as visiting professor at the Polytechnic University of Timișoara. He speaks Italian, French and English, and is a member of numerous professional bodies. He has expertise/experience in university administration, agricultural and environmental engineering, cadastre, urban planning. In February 2016, Popescu was elected rector of USABMT for a period of four years.
