= Constantin Diaconovici Loga National College (Timișoara) =

High school in Timișoara, Romania

- Colegiul Național „Constantin Diaconovici Loga”
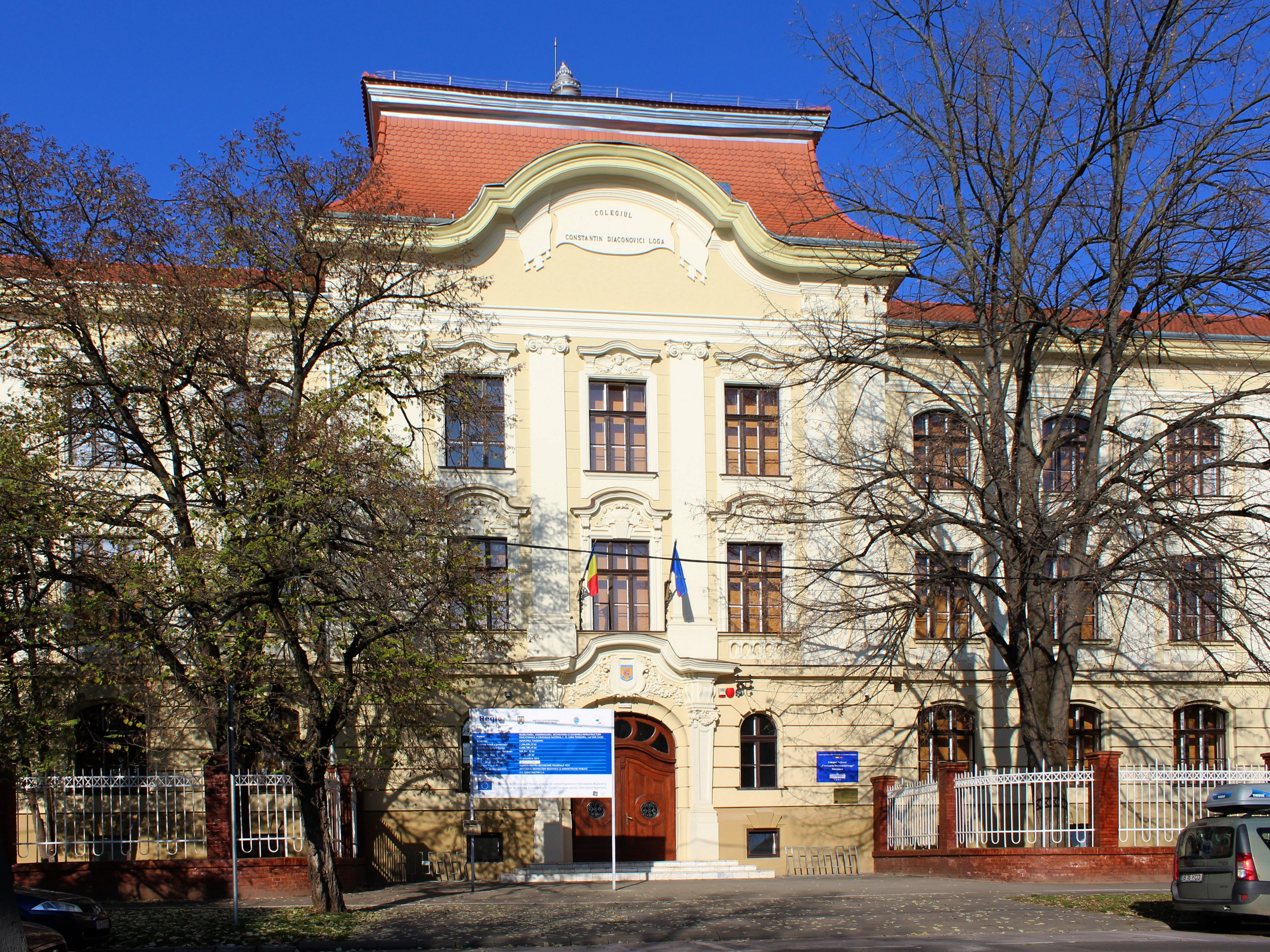

Location
- 37 Constantin Diaconovici Loga Boulevard, Timișoara
- 45°45′10″N 21°14′3″E

Information
- Type: High school
- Established: 7 August 1919; 106 years ago
- Authority: Ministry of National Education
- Principal: Tihomir Milin
- Faculty: 63 (2020/2021)
- Language: Romanian
- Website: cdloga.ro

Constantin Diaconovici Loga National College is one of the most prestigious high schools in Timișoara. It is named after Romanian educator Constantin Diaconovici Loga (1770–1850). Before the establishment of the communist regime in Romania, the Boys' High School functioned in the building. At the 2024 evaluation of Romanian secondary schools, the college came in 16th place, with a score of 9.39/10.

== History ==
In 1897, the State High School was established, with teaching in Hungarian. The courses take place on the second floor of the Primary and Vocational School in Huniade Square. On 1 August 1897, a contract was concluded between the Timișoara City Hall and the Minister of Religion and Education, Gyula Wlassics, regarding the construction of a new building for the State High School; it was completed in 1903. The first generation of students (15 Hungarians, 10 Romanians, 9 Jews, and the rest Germans, Serbs and Bulgarians) started school in the new building in the same year. Between 1903–1919 it operated as a Hungarian-language school, with Bertalan Schönvitzky (1903–1914) and János Reday (1914–1919) as principals.

On 7 August 1919, the school was taken over by the Romanian administration and became the first Romanian high school in Timișoara, named after educator Constantin Diaconovici Loga. It takes over the organization system of the Romanian secondary education: the lower cycle (grades I–IV) and the upper cycle (grades V–VIII). The first director was the Romanian language teacher Silviu Bejan. In 1926, under the principalship of Vasile Mioc, the high school became a college – Constantin Diaconovici Loga Banat National College.

In 1934, the section with teaching in Serbian – lower cycle – was established. In 1943, the upper cycle of the Serbian-language teaching department was established, which would function until 1948. In 1944, near the close of World War II, the school building was occupied and turned into a hospital by the Red Army. In 1945, following the establishment of a Romanian Communist Party-dominated government, a number of students took part in a spontaneous demonstration in favor of the embattled King Michael I. Students and teachers were then arrested; principal Vasile Mioc and his deputy Iuliu Ilca were sent to the Caracal labor camp for three months.

In 1948 the new authorities changed the title of the school to the Boys' High School no. 1. Subsequently, it will successively change its name in Secondary School no. 1, Nikos Beloyannis High School and High School of Mathematics and Physics. In 1959, the section with teaching in Hungarian was established, which will operate for 10 years.

In 1970 the school will retake the name of its spiritual patron under the title of Constantin Diaconovici Loga High School. In 1990, by moving to the category of colleges, the name of the school became Constantin Diaconovici Loga College, and in 1999 it obtained the status of national college. Between 2013 and 2016, the building was evacuated for major repairs, the teaching activity taking place in the building of the former Tudor Tănăsescu School Group on Lorraine Street. Rehabilitation involved the complete restoration of the roof and the redistribution of school spaces.

== Material base ==
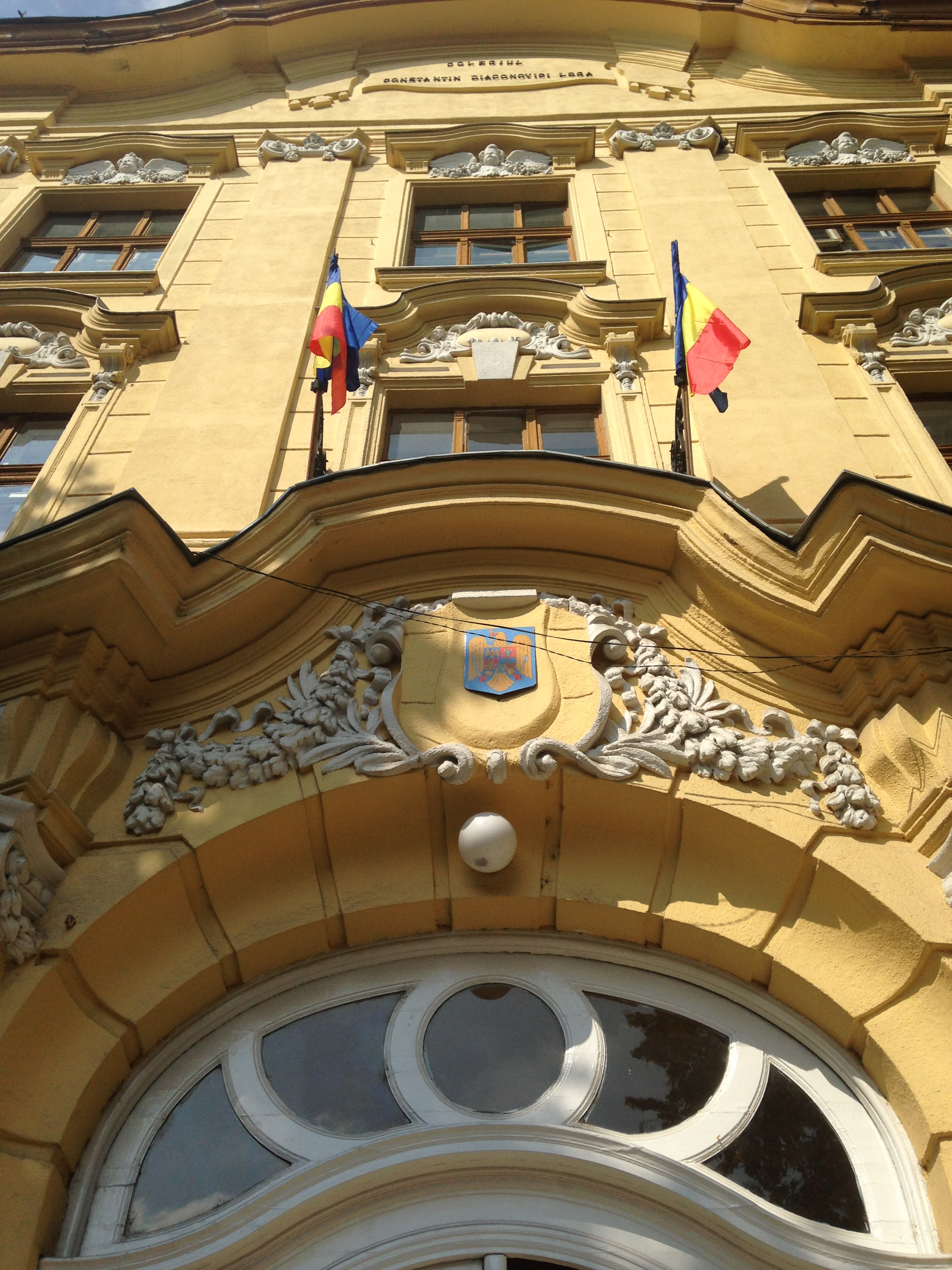
Architectural details on the main facade of the college

The ensemble of the Constantin Diaconovici Loga National College totals an area of 6,473 m^{2} and is located in the central area of the city, in the square delimited by Constantin Diaconovici Loga and Mihai Eminescu boulevards and by René Brasey and Camil Petrescu streets. The building is inscribed in the list of historical monuments with the code TM-II-m-B-06146.

The building was erected between April 1902 and July 1903, on a 2,500-square-fathom plot of land, with four street fronts, the main facade being individualized by a huge access gate made of solid wood, beautifully decorated. It was designed by Ignác Alpár. The building is distinguished by a balanced, solemn architecture, obtained by a strong massiveness, being composed of a main body with two wings and a building adjacent to the first body that houses the sports hall. The architectural style is that of the Viennese Baroque, distinguished by symmetry and balance. The windows and the pediment on the first floor have baroque frames, and the windows on the upper floor have semicircular arches with decorations.

In 1949, the festivities hall was built, with 350 seats, by superposing the sports hall. Both are embedded in the high school building and, even if they were built in successive stages, fall within the compositional principles of the original core.

== Notable teachers ==
- Titu Andreescu (born 1956), mathematician
- George Călinescu (1899–1965), literary critic, literary historian, novelist, academician and journalist
- Camil Petrescu (1894–1957), playwright, novelist, philosopher and poet

== Principals ==
Name	Term
Bertalan Schönvitzky	1903–1914
János Reday	1914–1919
Silviu Bejan	1919–1922
Augustin Coman	1922–1926
Silviu Bejan	1926–1927
Augustin Coman	1927–1928
Silviu Bejan	1928–1940
Constantin Cioflec	1940
Ioan Roșiu-Roșioru	1940
Gheorghe Oancea-Ursu	1940–1941
Vasile Mioc	1941–1948
Alexandru Grossu	1948–1949
Temistocle Bărcănescu	1949–1953
Emil Meșter	1953–1955
Trandafir Bălan	1955–1967
Valentin Drăgușan	1967–1969
Ioan Viriș	1969–1978
Dorin Craina	1978–1987
Nicolae Negoescu	1987–1990
Ioan Nedin	1990–1996
Dorin Craina	1996–2001
Alexandru Radovan	2001–2006
Simona Stoia	2006–2010
Tihomir Milin	2010–2012
Mariea Ștefan	2012–2015
Gizela Fuioagă	2015–2016
Tihomir Milin	2017–present
