= King Michael I University of Life Sciences =

University in Romania

King Mihai I University of Life Sciences
- Universitatea de Științele Vieții „Regele Mihai I”
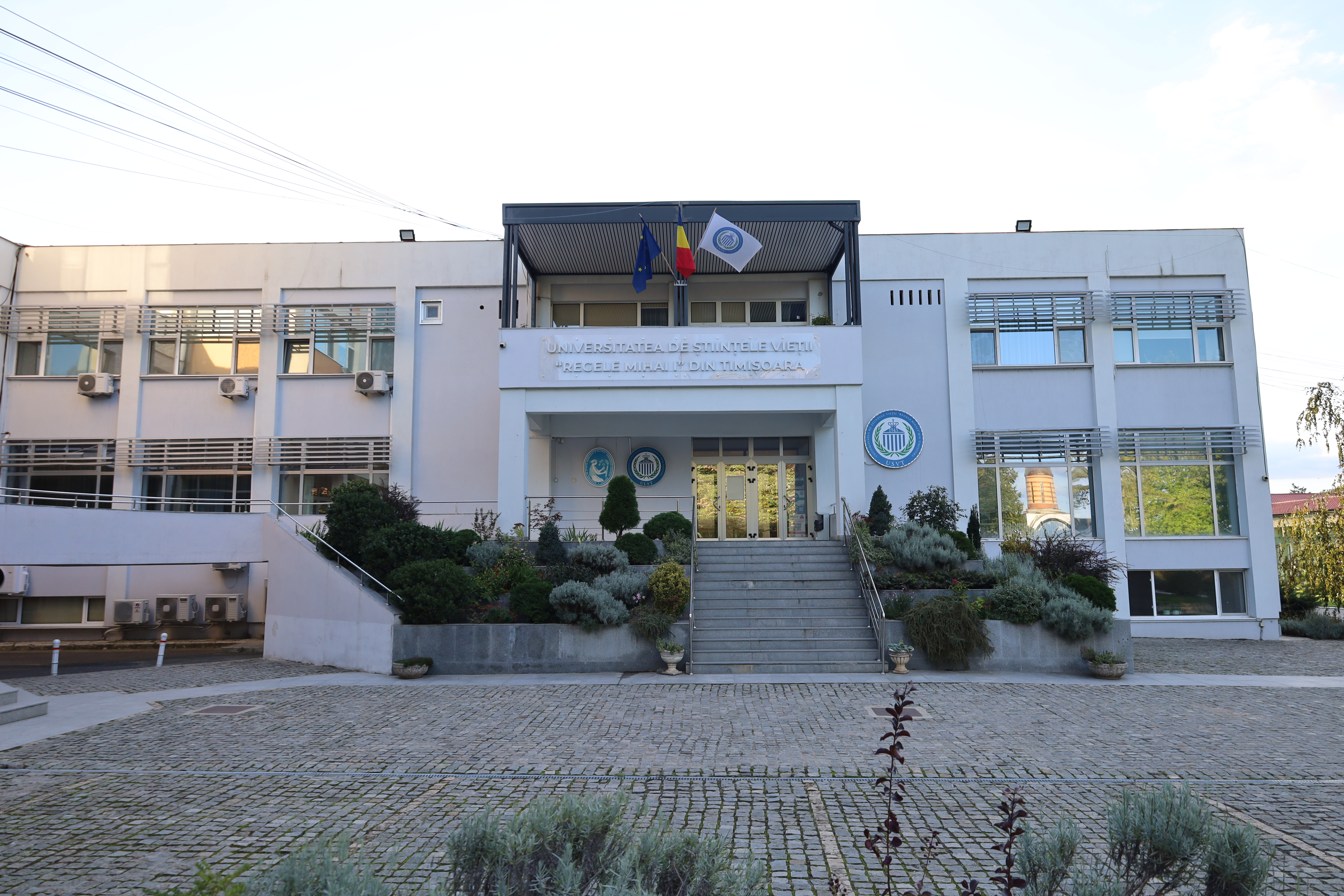
- Rectorate building
- Type: Public university
- Established: 30 July 1945; 81 years ago
- Founder: Mihai I of Romania
- Rector: Cosmin Alin Popescu
- Students: 6,540 (2025/2026)
- Location: 119 Calea Aradului, Timișoara, Romania; 45°47′1″N 21°12′50″E
- Campus: Urban
- Language: Romanian, English, French
- Website: www.usvt.ro

The King Mihai I University of Life Sciences (Romanian: Universitatea de Științele Vieții „Regele Mihai I”; abbreviated USVT), formerly named the Banat University of Agricultural Sciences and Veterinary Medicine "King Michael I of Romania", is a public university in Timișoara, Romania, which specializes in life sciences and veterinary medicine. It was named in honor of King Michael I of Romania.

== History ==
The existence of USVT is related to the establishment of the Faculty of Agronomy, within the Polytechnic Institute of Timișoara, by Law no. 617 promulgated by King Michael I on 30 July 1945. In 1948, the Faculty of Agronomy was transformed into an Agronomic Institute. In the same year, the Institute of Zootechnics and Veterinary Medicine was established in Arad, with two faculties: Zootechnics and Veterinary Medicine. In 1955, the Faculty of Zootechnics was transferred to the Agronomic Institute in Timișoara, and in 1957, the Faculty of Veterinary Medicine was integrated into a similar faculty in Bucharest. In 1957, the Faculty of Zootechnics was transformed into a section of the Faculty of Agronomy and functioned until 1962 under the name of the Faculty of Agriculture and Zootechnics. In 1962, the Faculty of Veterinary Medicine was established within Timișoara's Agronomic Institute. In 1968, by the Order of the Minister of Education no. 80646, the Faculty of Zootechnics was re-established, the Agronomic Institute functioning, until 1987, with three faculties: Agriculture, Zootechnics and Veterinary Medicine.

The overall degradation of the economic and social life, the crisis of the Romanian society and the restructuring of the university life by reduction in 1987 finds the Agronomic Institute with a single faculty with three sections (Agriculture, Zootechnics and Veterinary Medicine). In 1991, based on the Order of the Minister of Education no. 4894, the Agronomic Institute becomes the Banat University of Agricultural Sciences. In 1995, by Government Decision no. 568, the name of the university becomes the Banat University of Agricultural Sciences and Veterinary Medicine, and in 2013, by Government Decision no. 493, the institution is named after King Michael I of Romania, the symbolic founder of the university. The current name was approved by Government Decision no. 976 of August 2022.

== Faculties ==
Faculty	Dean	Bachelor's degree specializations	Master's degree specializations
Faculty of Agriculture	Florinel Imbrea	9: Agriculture; Agriculture (in English); Biology; Environmental engineering and protection in agriculture; Environmental engineering and protection in agriculture (in French); Land measurements and cadastre; Machinery and installations for agriculture and food industry; Operation of machinery and installations for agriculture and food industry; Plant protection	7: Biology applied in agriculture; Environmental and natural resource management; Management of systematic registration of agricultural lands in the context of rural development; Organic farming; Phytosanitary protection and expertise; Sustainable technologies for field crops; Sustainable use of agricultural land
Faculty of Animal Resources Bioengineering	Ioan Peț	3: Agricultural biotechnologies; Entrepreneurship in food production; Zootechnics	5: Design and technical-economic evaluation of animal productions; Nutrition and fodder base; Pets and recreational animals; Reproductive biotechnologies in animal breeding; Sustainable biotechnologies
Faculty of Food Engineering	Călin Jianu	3: Consumer and environmental protection; Food control and expertise; Food engineering	5: Advanced technologies in food industry; Human nutrition; Modern techniques in gastrotechnics and catering; Safety and biosecurity of agri-food products; Sustainability in agriculture, food production and food technology in the Danube region (in English)
Faculty of Engineering and Applied Technology	Alin Dobrei	4: Forestry; Genetic engineering; Horticulture; Landscaping	9: Conditioning, storage and tasting of wines (in French); Diversity of forest ecosystems; Forest management; Phytopharmaceutical biotechnologies; Quality of wine products and by-products; Safety and quality of primary horticultural products; Seed breeding and production in cultivated plants; Technologies in horticultural ecobiological systems; Urban ecodesign
Faculty of Management and Rural Tourism	Ramona Ciolac	3: Engineering and management in public alimentation and agrotourism; Engineering and management in tourism industry; Engineering and management of agricultural businesses	6: Agribusiness; Agricultural business administration; Agricultural business administration (in English); Bioeconomy (in English); Management in public alimentation and agrotourism; Sustainable rural development management
Faculty of Veterinary Medicine	Sorin Morariu	3: Veterinary medicine; Veterinary medicine (in English); Veterinary medicine (in French)	–

== Campus ==
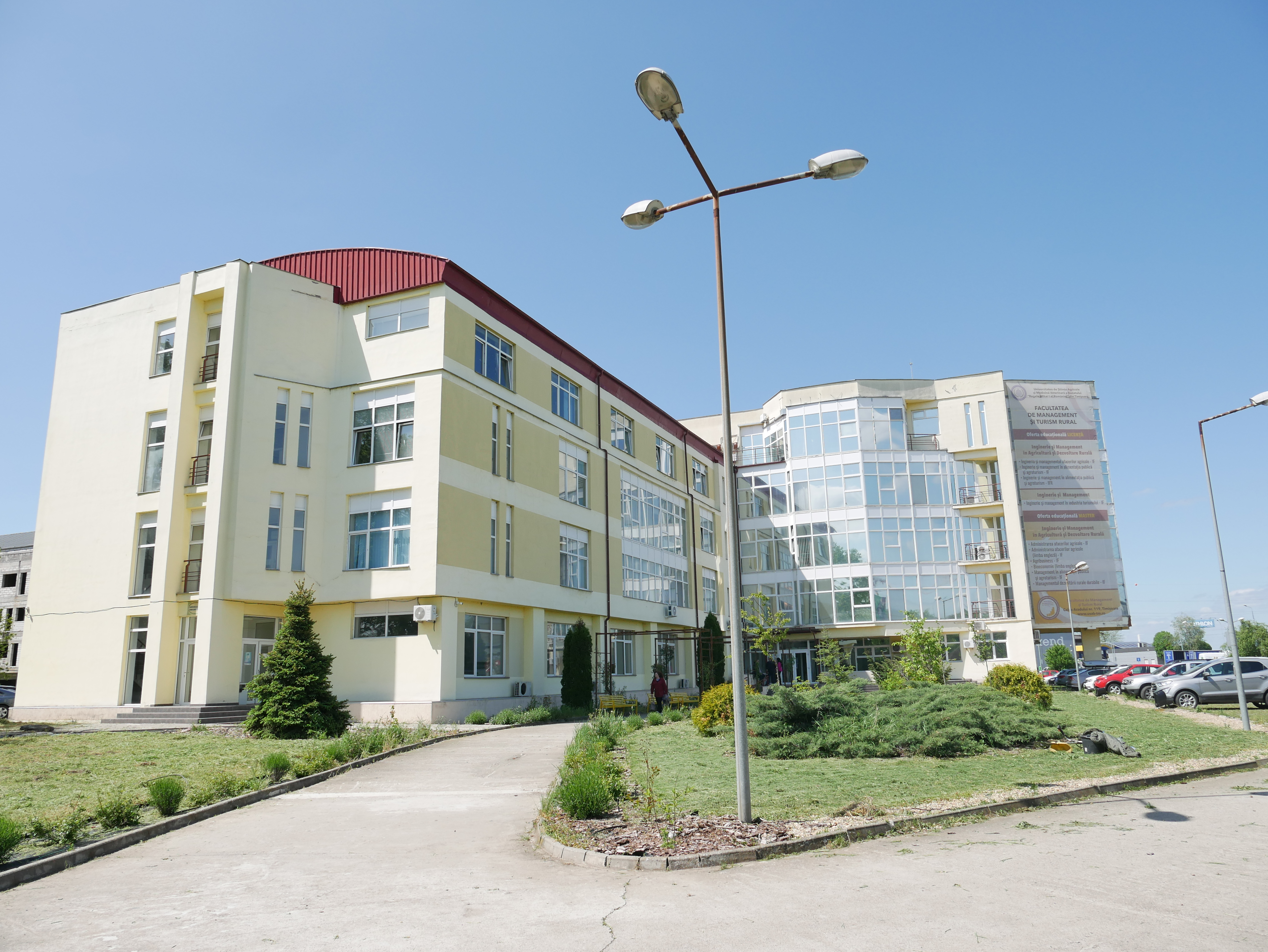
Building of the Faculty of Food Engineering and the Faculty of Management and Rural Tourism

The university campus is located at 119 Arad Way, at the exit to Arad. It was built between 1972 and 1982. All the faculties, the library, the dormitories, the canteen, the lands and a sports hall, as well as the biggest internship grounds – the didactic station – are in the same perimeter.

The structure of the educational spaces totals 15,630 m^{2} (168,200 sq ft) of usable area and 25,370 m^{2} (273,100 sq ft) of developed area. Students have access to modernized spaces, amphitheaters, laboratories, classrooms and seminar rooms. USVT offers its students a number of 1,516 places in five student dormitories. The student canteen, with a number of 450 seats and an area of 1,589 m^{2} (17,100 sq ft), is considered one of the most modern and beautiful in the country. Among other things, the university has pig, cow and poultry farms, crops for all seasons, fruit tree orchard and greenhouses, a lake and a fishery – where sturgeon and African catfish are bred. The internship of the university students takes place at the didactic station, Farm 1 – Cioreni, Farm 2 – Km 6 (former protocol base of the Romanian Communist Party), Farm 3 – Lugoj, Farm 9 – Green Forest, in the veterinary clinics, at the Young Naturalists Station, Romanian-German Center for Training and Professional Development in the Field of Agriculture, as well as profile companies.

In 2014, USVT received a certificate of excellence for "Best Campus" offered by Oxford University.

== Doctores honoris causa ==
- Karl Fritz Lauer (1938–2018), phytopathologist and herbologist
- Erwin Teufel (b. 1939), Minister-President of Baden-Württemberg (1991–2005)
- Margareta of Romania (b. 1949), eldest daughter of King Michael I
- Heinrich Gräpel (b. 1951), phytopathologist and entomologist
- Ioan Selejan (b. 1951), Metropolitan of Banat (2014–present)
