= Ioan Vlădea =

Romanian engineer

Ioan Vlădea (24 October 1907, Râșnov, 24 November 1976, Timișoara) was a Romanian engineer from IAR Brașov, who developed the compressor of plane engine IAR 80. After World War II he served as professor at Polytechnic University of Timișoara.

He is considered the founder of Timișoara school of thermal engineering.

== Early years and education ==
He was born in Râșnov, as the only son among the five children of Ioan and Elena Vlădea, a poor peasant family.

He attended the Facultatea de Electromecanică of Universitatea Politehnica of Timișoara, and graduated in 1931. He had as professors Victor Vâlcovici, Valeriu Alaci, Plautius Andronescu, Pompiliu Nicolau, Victor Vlad and Marin Bănărescu. On 23 February 1931 received his engineering diploma titled Alimentarea cu energie electrică a orașului Brașov (Power supply of Brașov city), under the guidance of Dimitrie Leonida.

Then he gets a scholarship in aerodynamics, 1 March 1932 at „Technische Hochschule Aachen” from Aachen, where on 21 July 1933 he sustains dissertation under the guidance of Hermann Starke (1874–1960) titled Über den Einfluss des Rumpfes (Gondeln) auf einige aerodynamische Eigenschaften des Flügels Despre influența fuselajului (gondolelor de motoare) asupra unor proprietăți aerodinamice ale aripii, thesis published in Sibiu in 1934 by author and also in „Bulletin Scientifique de l'École Politehnique de Timișoara” (1938).

== At IAR Brașov ==
From 15 October 1933 he worked at Industria Aeronautică Română Brașov, until 10 December 1944. Until 31 August 1935 worked as designer of wing cells, guided by Elie Carafoli.

In this period he designs several types of propellers.

== Didactic career ==
In October 1945 Marin Bănărescu invites Vlădea to teach at Politehnica of Timișoara the course „Motoare Ușoare” (plane engines). In March 1946 he passed the exam of lecturer at discipline „Mașini termice”. He commutes between Brașov–Timișoara.

On 8 December 1948 he is appointed professor and head of Department of Thermal engineering newly founded by division of former Department of Termotehnică și Mașini Termice, whose head was Marin Bănărescu, position held until retirement, on 30 September 1973.

As recognition of merits, in 1970 he was awarded the title of Professor universitar emerit.

After retirement he remains consulting professor, guiding PhDs like that of Sabin Peculea concerning heavy water.

== Engineering achievements ==
Researches at IAR work Calculul de rezistență al elicelor aeriene, Efectul giroscopic asupra elicelor aeriene and Compresorul motorului de avion, awarded 1940 „Adamachi” prize Academiei Române and first prize of Cercul Aeronautic Român.

After 1951, : technical translation vol. 1 din Taschenbuch für den Maschinenbau by Heinrich Dubbel, 2000 entries to Lexiconul Tehnic Român, chapter „Căldura” from Manualul Inginerului (coord. Gheorghe Buzdugan) of 1956.

Starting from 1953 Teoria și calculul turnurilor de răcire, does grant researches with Institutul de Studii și Proiectări Energetice (ISPE) and Institutul de Cercetări și Modernizări Energetice (ICEMENERG) in heat and mass transfer.

Results of inquiries in these fields were published in over 60 articles in Buletinul științific și tehnic IPT, Buletinul Institutului de Energetica al Academiei RSR, revistele Energetica, Brensthoff Wärme Kraft, Luft- und Kältetechnik, Energietechnik, Chemie Ingenieur Technik etc., in the textbook Instalații și utilaje termice.

== Publications ==
- Compresorul motorului de avion, București: Editura Monitorul Official, 1940

Courses and textbooks:

- Termodinamica tehnică, vol. 1 curs, Timișoara, 1955, 450 p.
- Producerea și transmiterea căldurii, vol. 2 curs, Timișoara, 1957, 382 p.
- Bazele teoretice ale termotehnicii, vol. I, 1956 și vol. II, 1957, București: Editura Tehnică
- Manual de termotehnică, București: Editura Didactică și Pedagogică, vol. 1, 1962 și vol. 2, 1963
- Termodinamica tehnică; Producerea și transmiterea căldurii., vol. 2 (1963, 398 p.)
- Instalații și utilaje termice, București: Editura Tehnică, 1966
- Tratat de termodinamică tehnică și transmiterea căldurii, București, Editura Didactică și Pedagogică, 1974

== Awards ==
- „Adamachi” Prize of Romanian Academy (1940), for the book Compresorul motorului de avion,
- First Prize from Ministerului Învățământului și Culturii (1963), for Manual de termotehnică,
- Medal Meritul Științific (1966),
- Title of Professor universitar emerit (1970).
