= Berești (disambiguation) =

Berești may refer to several places in Romania:

- Berești, a town in Galați County
- Berești, a village in Sascut Commune, Bacău County
- Berești, a village in Hănțești Commune, Suceava County
- Berești, a village in Lăpușata Commune, Vâlcea County
- Berești-Bistrița, a commune in Bacău County
- Berești-Meria, a commune in Galați County
- Berești-Tazlău, a commune in Bacău County
