= Gheorghe Ciuhandu =

Romanian politician

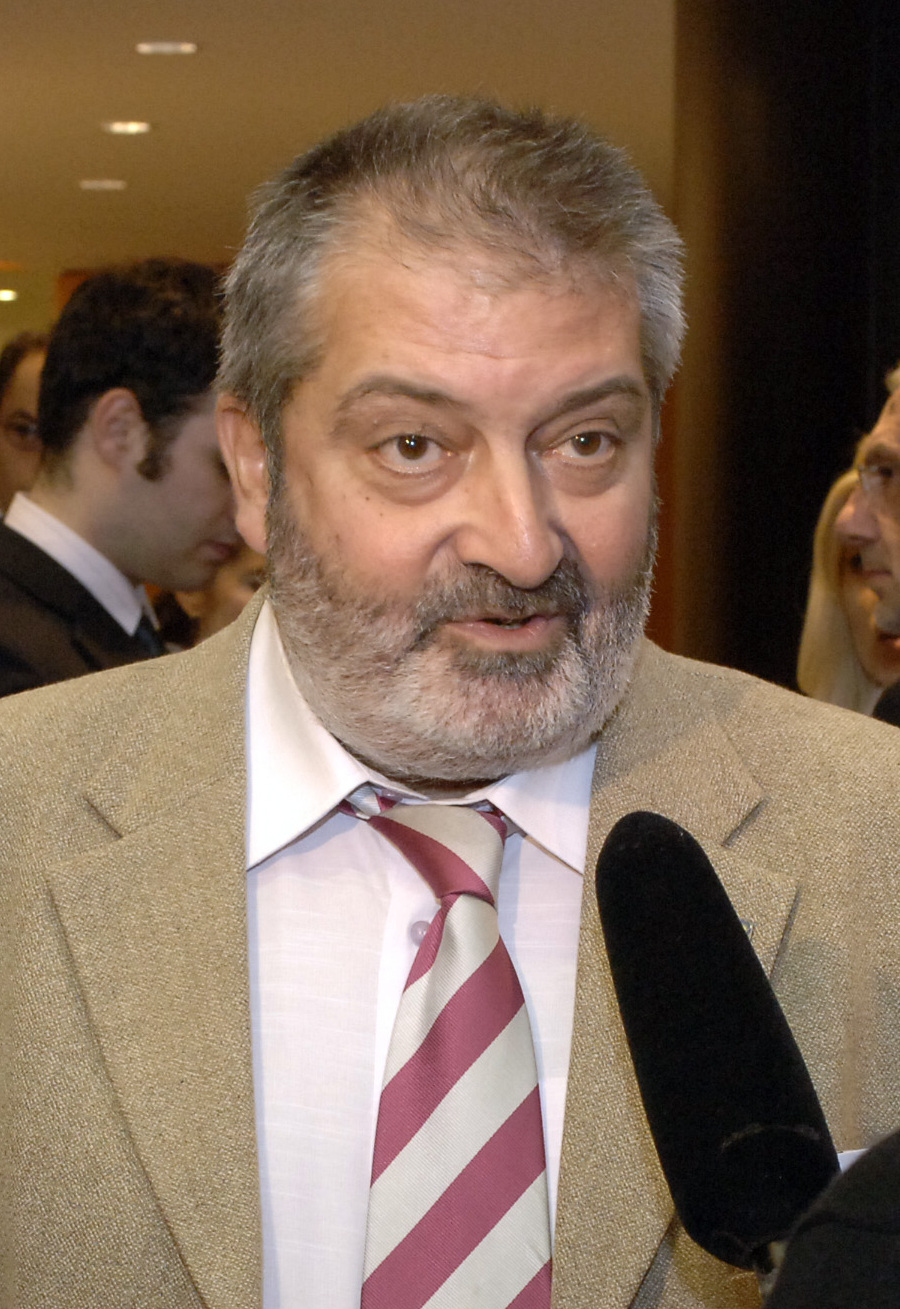
- November 2006

Mayor of Timișoara
- In office 3 June 1996 – 9 June 2012
- Preceded by: Viorel Oancea
- Succeeded by: Nicolae Robu

Personal details
- Born: 15 June 1947 (age 78) Timișoara, Romania
- Party: Christian Democratic National Peasants' Party (PNȚCD)

Gheorghe Coriolan Ciuhandu (Romanian pronunciation: [ˈɡe̯orɡe kori.oˈlan tʃjuˈhandu]; born 15 June 1947) is a Romanian politician.

A building engineer by profession, he graduated from the Traian Vuia Polytechnic Institute in 1970, earning a doctorate in 1986 and joining the faculty in 1993. He was the mayor of Timișoara from 1996 to 2012 and was one of the losing candidates for president in the 2004 presidential elections, in which he represented the Christian Democratic National Peasants' Party (PNȚCD). He replaced Victor Ciorbea as president of the PNȚCD in 2004, and, in 2007 he was replaced by Marian Petre Miluț as president of PNȚCD.

== Honours ==
- (Romania) Romanian Royal Family: 42nd Knight of the Royal Decoration of the Cross of the Romanian Royal House

== Electoral history ==
=== Presidential elections ===
Election	Affiliation	First round			Second round		
Election	Affiliation	Votes	Percentage	Position	Votes	Percentage	Position
2004	PNȚCD	198,394	1.9%	5th			
