= Alexandru Piru =

Romanian literary critic and historian

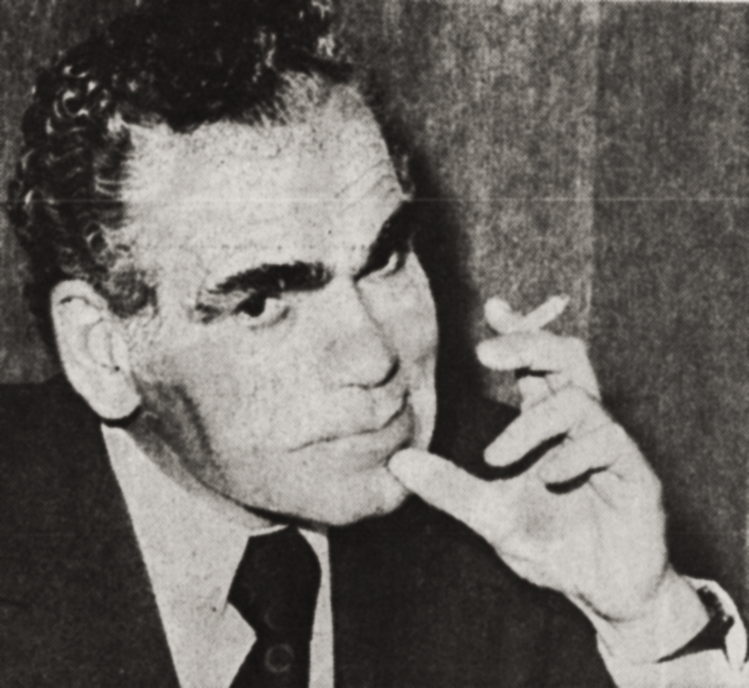
Piru in 1978

Alexandru Piru (August 22, 1917 – November 6, 1993) was a Romanian literary critic and historian.

Born in Mărgineni, Bacău County, his parents were Vasile, a notary, and his wife Elena (née Chelaru). In 1936, he graduated from Ferdinand I High School in Bacău, thereupon enrolling in the literature and philosophy faculty of the University of Iași. He graduated in 1940, and completed the pedagogical academy in Bucharest the following year. From 1943 to 1944, he taught at the National College in Iași. Piru then settled for good in Bucharest. In early 1946, he became a teaching assistant in George Călinescu's department at the University of Bucharest. In mid-1947, he received a doctorate; the thesis dealt with the works of Garabet Ibrăileanu. In 1967, he was awarded a doctorate in philology. Excluded from teaching and from public life by the new communist regime in 1948 for political reasons, he worked as a surveyor, lathe operator, and methane gas fitter until 1955. He was allowed to return to higher education the following year. Piru eventually became a full professor and chairman of the Romanian literature department. He was a titular member of the academy of social and political sciences. Late in life, following the Romanian Revolution of 1989, he served as a Senator for the National Salvation Front.

Piru's first published work appeared in Jurnalul literar in 1939. He also contributed to Ramuri (where he was editor-in-chief from 1969 to 1974), Luceafărul and România Literară. His first book, the 1946 Viața lui G. Ibrăileanu, was immediately followed by Opera lui G. Ibrăileanu, published only in 1959. Barred from publishing during his years as a laborer, he collected his postwar criticism as Panorama deceniului literar românesc 1940-1950 (1968). The two-volume Poezia românească contemporană. 1950-1975 (1975) also focused on contemporary literature, as did Debuturi (1981). Literatură română veche (1961) and Literatură română premodernă (1964), originally adapted from courses, were re-edited as Istoria literaturii române de la origini până în 1830 (1977). The same approach of synthesis, combined with a feeling for the ineffable rare among historians, is visible in his studies of a monographic nature: Liviu Rebreanu, 1965 (translated into French, English and German), C. Negruzzi, 1966; Poeții Văcărești, 1967; I. Eliade Rădulescu, 1971; Introducere în opera lui Vasile Alecsandri, 1978; and G. Călinescu. Some of these were collected as Permanențe românești (1978).

Other studies, not as extensive but covering the entire breadth of Romanian literature, are found in volumes of the Varia series, as well as in Analize și sinteze critice, Valori clasice, Marginalia and Reflexe și interferențe, attempts at comparative literature. His historical synthesis was brought up to date in Istoria literaturii române de la început până azi (1981). He supervised and prefaced numerous editions of classic and modern writers, from Mihai Eminescu and Ion Creangă to Tudor Arghezi, George Bacovia, Emil Botta and Călinescu, whose Istoria literaturii române de la origini până în prezent he revised and enlarged into a second edition in 1982. According to critic Cornel Moraru, Piru's novel Cearta (1969) and his verses in Jurnalul literar confirm his literary talent. Alex. Ștefănescu finds that the novel, which deals with the mores of the intellectual class, with an emphasis on erotic relations, was an unsuitable medium for Piru, who remained precise and prosaic even when attempting jocularity. He notes that it is a roman à clef, like Călinescu's Bietul Ioanide, but minor in comparison.

Initially, Piru's criticism was far too indebted to Călinescu, later diverging on an independent course. This was not so much deliberate as a natural result of allowing his own talent to flourish. He came to be regarded as among the most important of his country's critics and literary historians. In 1973, Piru was awarded the Bucharest writers' association prize, and in 1977 took the Romanian Academy's B. P. Hasdeu award. His wife Elena was herself a critic. In 2006, he was posthumously elected to the Academy.
