= Constantin C. Teodorescu =

Romanian engineer

Constantin C. Teodorescu (March 22, 1892–1972) was a Romanian engineer.

Born in Bucharest to a low-ranking employee of the Education Ministry, he attended primary school in his native city. Subsequently, he went to Iași on a scholarship, first going to the Costache Negruzzi High School, followed by the National High School. He graduated from the latter institution's science department in 1911, then winning a place at the National School for Bridges and Roads. There, his professors included Anghel Saligny, Elie Radu, Ion Ionescu-Bizeț, David Emmanuel, and Nicolae Vasilescu-Karpen. After obtaining a degree as a bridge and road engineer in 1916, he was named an engineer in the munitions directorate, subsequently passing to the Public Works Ministry's bridges and roads directorate. He worked there in 1920, when he was named teaching assistant at his alma mater's strength of materials department.

In the autumn of 1920, Traian Lalescu invited him to become assistant director of the new Timișoara Polytechnic School, and he held this position until 1924. Meanwhile, he was substitute professor of rational mechanics (1920–1921) and strength of materials (1921–1923). In 1923, he was named acting professor of materials resistance, becoming permanent professor in 1926 and remaining as such until 1939. While at Timișoara, he served as rector from 1934 to 1939. Subsequently, he transferred to what had become the Polytechnic School of Bucharest. There, he was rector from January 1941, in the aftermath of the Legionnaires' rebellion, until October 1944, after the coup against the country's pro-Axis dictator. He was also professor of materials strength from 1940 to 1948. Following the education reform imposed by the new Communist regime, he was assigned to teach at the Bucharest railway institute until this was absorbed by the Polytechnic. He retired in 1959 and was granted the title of professor emeritus in 1962.
