= Arțari =

Arțari may refer to several places in Romania:

- Arțari, a village in Ileana Commune, Călăraşi County
- Arțari, a village in Hănțești Commune, Suceava County
