= Ion Vidu =

Romanian composer and choral conductor

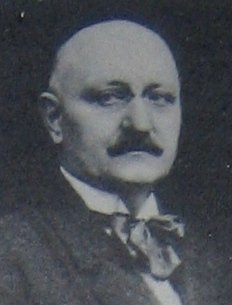
Ion Vidu

Ion Vidu (29 December 1863 [O.S. 17 December] (Note: The Arad County used old style dates until 1920.) – 7 February 1931), was a Romanian composer and choral conductor. Under his influence the small town of Lugoj, which up until that time had not that much in the way of artistic institutions, became a well-known center of choral music in Romania.

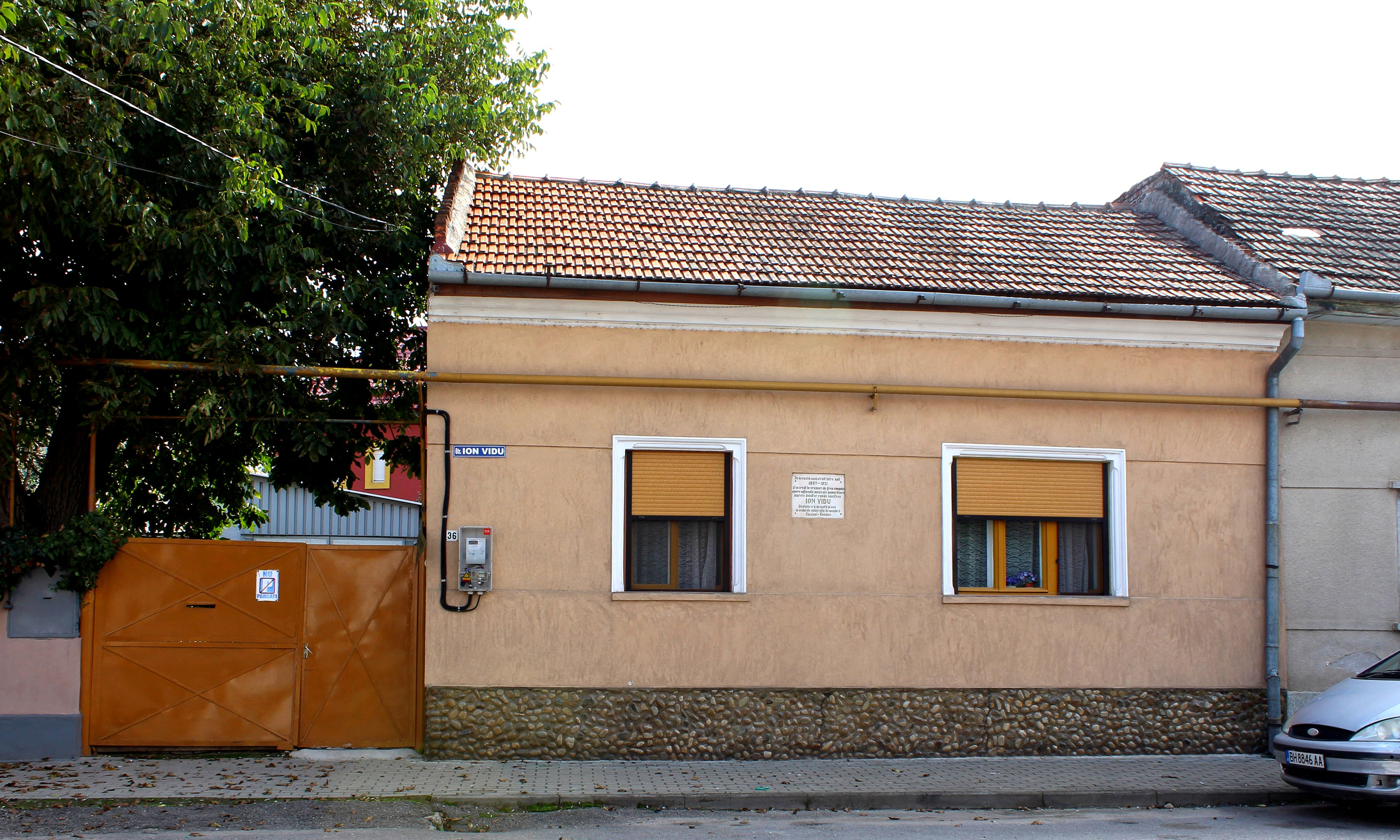
Ion Vidu's house in Lugoj

Vidu was born in Mânerău, Arad County, Austrian Empire, where he initially studied music at the Arad Conservatory (1880–1881) and later at Caransebeș in the Banat region just south of Arad (1885). From 1890 to 1891 he attended the Conservatory of Music and Declamation in Iași (in the historical region of Moldavia, very near the northeastern border of modern Romania), studying harmony and choral conducting with Gavriil Musicescu. He subsequently moved back to Banat, obtaining a post in Lugoj (midway between Caransebeș and Timișoara), where he stayed for the rest of his life. Almost all of his compositions are for chorus. In 1922 he organized the Banat Choral and Brass Band Society, which at one time included more than 10,000 peasant singers. Like his friends and fellow composers Gavriil Musicescu, Béla Bartók, and Dumitru Kiriac-Georgescu, he was an avid collector of folk music. Vidu based most of his music on Romanian folk tunes, although he avoided the modes characteristic of folk music and primarily used major and minor tonality. His first collection of choral music, Severina (1899), became so well known, that many of the original melodies from it are often mistakenly thought to be authentic folk tunes. The patriotic, anti-Habsburg flavor of his succeeding works also proved to be very popular.
