= List of mayors of Timișoara =

Mayor of Timișoara
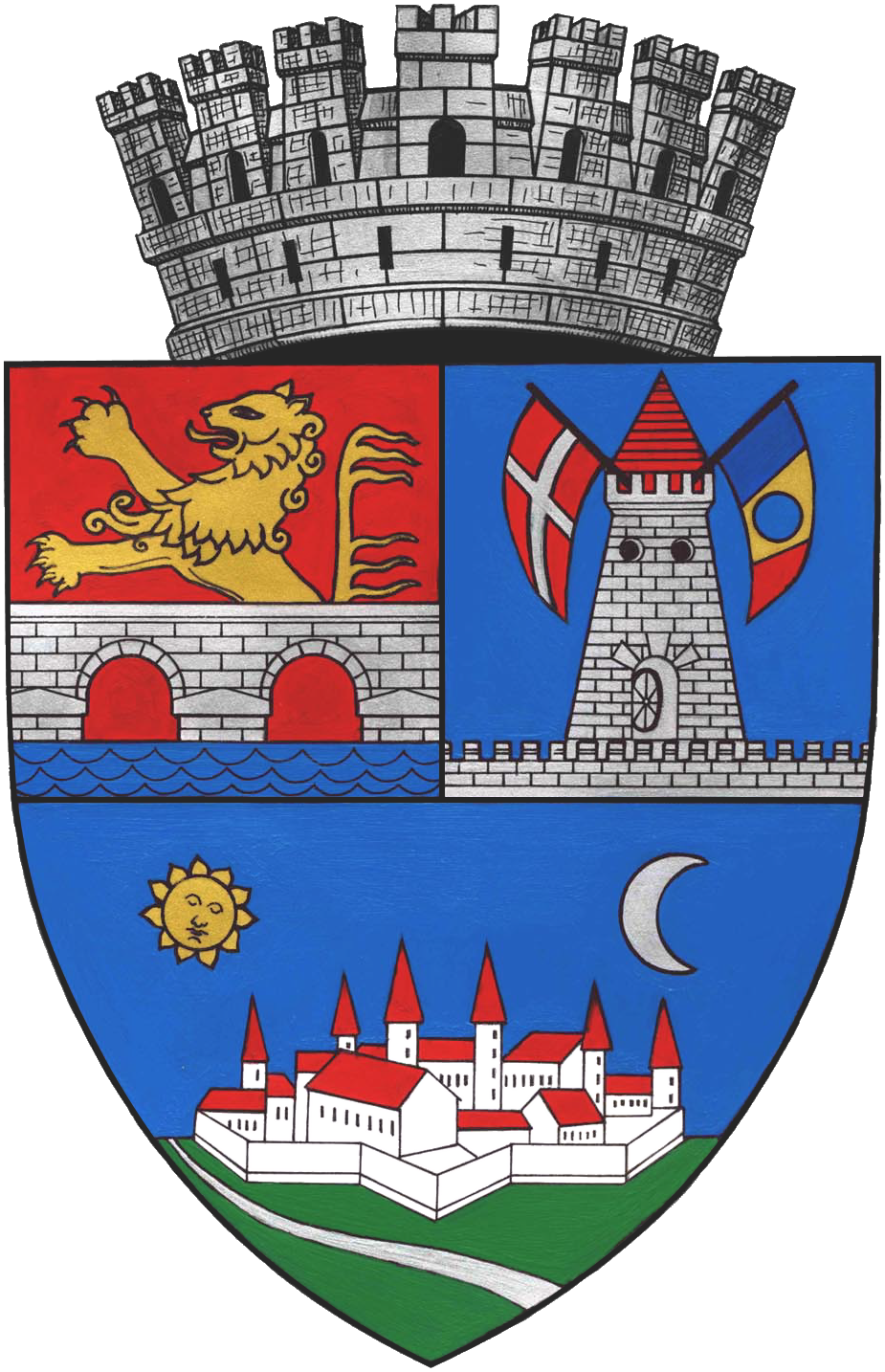
- Coat of arms of Timișoara

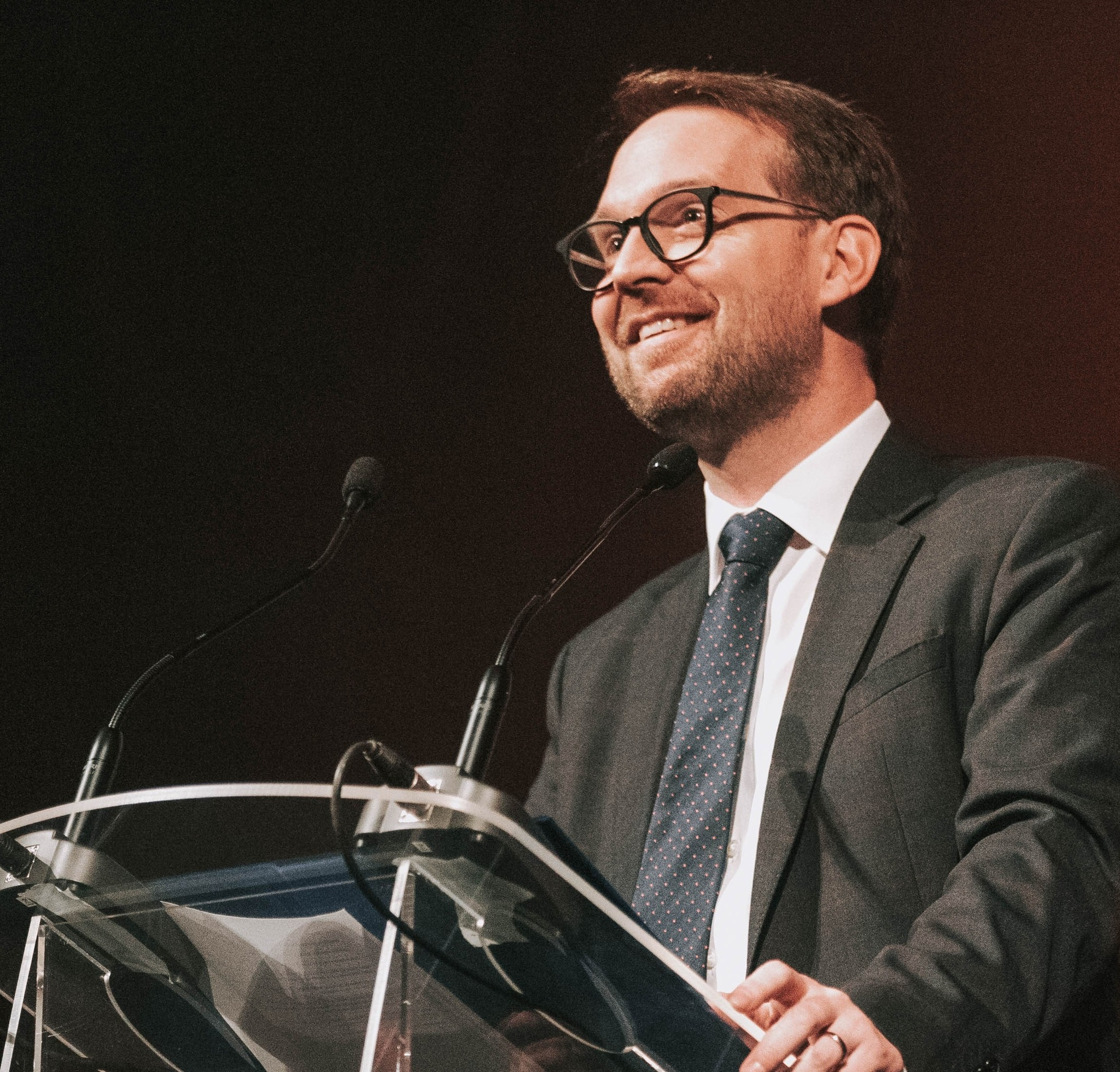
- Incumbent; Dominic Fritz since 28 September 2020
- Timișoara City Hall
- Seat: New City Hall, Timișoara
- Term length: Four years
- Constituting instrument: Administrative Code § 154
- Inaugural holder: Tobias Hold
- Formation: 1 January 1718
- Deputy: Two vice mayors
- Salary: RON 18,720 per month
- Website: www.primariatm.ro

This is a list of mayors of Timișoara from 1718, when Banat, including Timișoara, were incorporated into the Kingdom of Hungary, to the present day when it is part of Romania. The position was created on 1 January 1718 by Count Claude Florimond de Mercy, governor of Banat, under the name of magistrate. Until 1780, Timișoara had two magistrates, one German for the German population settled here and one Illyrian or Rascian for the local population. The first German magistrate of the city was Tobias Balthasar Hold, a campaign medical doctor from Bavaria and among the first foreign, Western settlers to arrive in Timișoara. Together with the Rascian magistrate, its task was to enforce measures to maintain public safety and hygiene, collect taxes and enforce the fire authority's regulations.

== 18th century ==
- Tobias Hold, 1718–1719
- Florian Blam, 1719–1720
- Tobias Hold, 1720–1722
- Peter Solderer, 1722–1742
- Andreas Pfann, 1742–1745
- Peter Mayer, 1745–1749
- Joseph Leibnitzer, 1749–1754
- Michael Auer, 1754–1756
- Anton Klang, 1756–1758
- Pietro Antonio Delpondio, 1758–1761
- Adam Ebelshauser, 1761–1762
- Joseph Anton Kulterer, 1762–1771
- Bartholomäus Lederer, 1771–1774
- Pietro Antonio Delpondio, 1774–1780
- Johann Michael Leudoldt, 1780–1782
- Pietro Antonio Delpondio, 1782–1786 (Note: Joint tenure between 1783 and 1786)
- Adam Ingrueber, 1783–1786
- Thomas Reyhuber, 1786–1787
- Sebastian Schmid, 1787–1789
- Ignaz Koppauer, 1789–1808

== 19th century ==
- Simon Petrovics, 1808–1810
- Peter Plavisics, 1810–1812
- Michael Kuenatter, 1812–1816
- József Tessényi, 1816–1819
- Joseph Klapka, 1819–1833
- Johann Speckner (Koronghy von Korongh), 1833–1844
- Johann Preyer, 1844–1858
- Aloise Marguet (governing commissar), 1858–1859
- Karl Küttel, 1859–1861
- Joseph Weigl, 1861–1867
- Karl Küttel, 1867–1872
- Franz Steiner, 1872–1876
- János Török, 1876–1885
- Karol Telbiz, 1885–1914

== 20th century ==
- Joseph Geml, 1914–1919
- Karl Leopold von Möller, 1919
- Stan Vidrighin, 1919–1921
- Cornel Grofșorean, 1921–1922
- Stan Vidrighin, 1922
- Lucian Georgevici, 1922–1926
- Samuil Sagovici, 1926
- Ioan Doboșan, 1926–1927
- Joseph Gabriel, 1927
- Lucian Georgevici, 1927–1929
- Gheorghe Crăciun, 1929
- Gheorghe Domășnean, 1929
- Franz Schmitz, 1929
- Coriolan Băran, 1929–1930
- Coriolan Balta, 1930–1931
- Cornel Grofșorean, 1931–1932
- Cornel Lazăr, 1932
- Liviu Gabor, 1932–1933
- Petru Olariu, 1933
- Augustin Coman, 1933–1937
- Alexandru Miletici, 1937–1938
- Gheorghe Andrașiu, 1938
- Nicolaie Table, 1938
- Vasile M. Teodorescu, 1938
- Rodig Modreanu, 1938
- Coriolan Băran, 1938–1939
- Emil Tieranu, 1939
- Coriolan Băran, 1939–1940
- Ilie Radu, 1940–1941
- Hans Jung, 1941
- Eugen Pop, 1941–1943
- Ioan Doboșan, 1943–1944
- Liviu Gabor, 1944–1945
- Traian Novac, 1945–1946
- Iosif Petric, 1946–1948
- Vasile Botezatu, 1948–1950
- Ion Hașmanian, 1950
- Ioan Jurjac, 1950–1953
- Valeriu Țidorescu, 1953
- Ioan Silindean, 1953–1954
- Radu Donosie, 1954–1956
- Vasile Botezatu, 1956–1961
- Ioan Popeți, 1961–1965
- Leonida Tămaș, 1965–1968
- Coriolan Pop, 1968–1971
- George Micota, 1971–1977
- Radu Bălan, 1977–1980
- Petru Moț, 1980–1989
- Pompiliu Alămorean, 1990
- Liviu Borha, 1990–1992
- Viorel Oancea (PAC), 1992–1996
- Gheorghe Ciuhandu (PNȚCD), 1996–2012

== 21st century ==
- Gheorghe Ciuhandu (PNȚCD), 1996–2012
- Nicolae Robu (PNL), 2012–2020
- Dominic Fritz (USR), 2020–present
