= Ion Maiorescu National College =

High school in Romania

Coordinates: 43.8924°N 25.9664°E

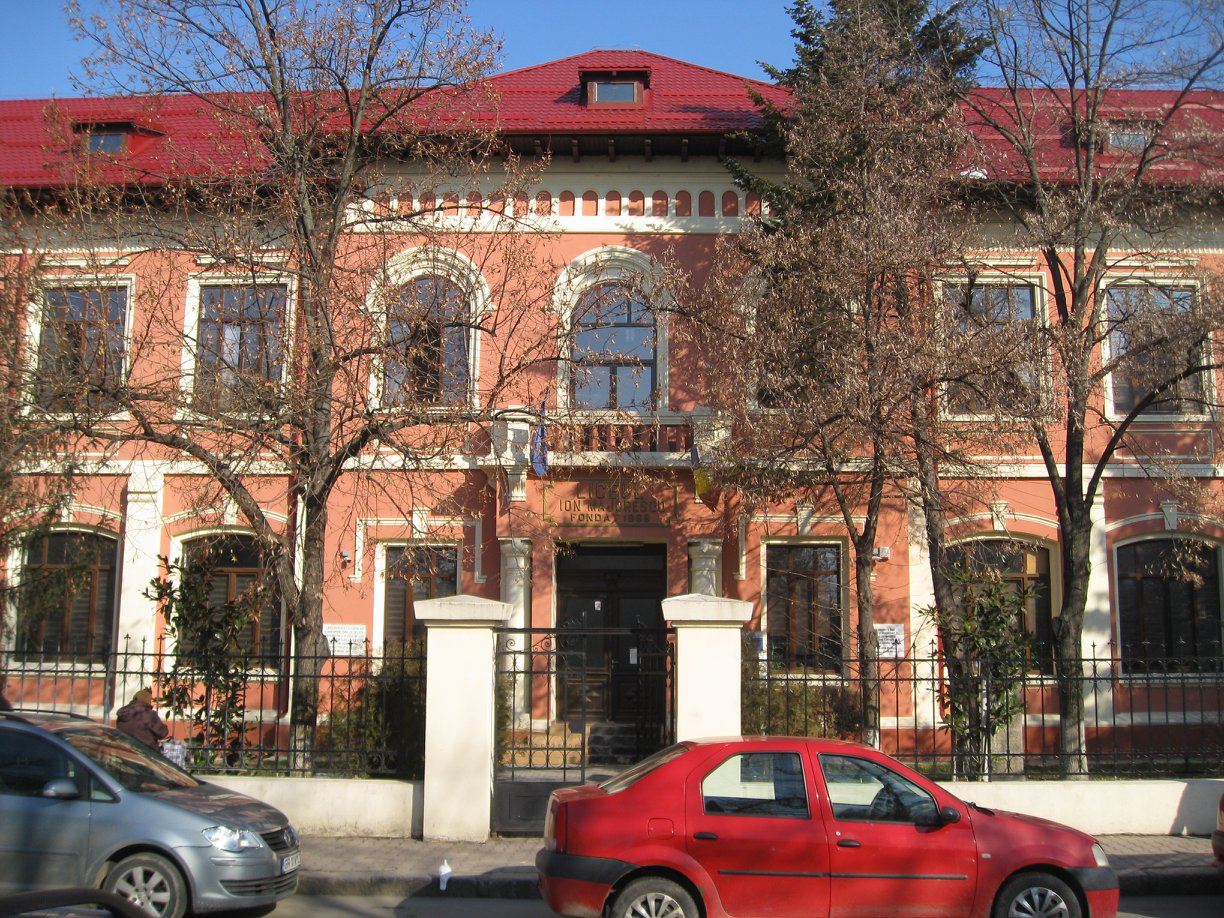
Ion Maiorescu National College

Ion Maiorescu National College (Romanian: Colegiul Național Ion Maiorescu) is a high school located at 8 Nicolae Droc Barcian Street, Giurgiu, Romania.

The Giurgiu City Council decided to open a gymnasium in 1868, and work soon began on a building. Ready in little over a year, the school opened in November 1869. It had eighteen pupils taught by two teachers. Nicolae Droc Barcian joined the faculty in 1870, rising to principal in 1873 and becoming a prominent local figure. In 1890, Upon his suggestion, the school was named after 1848 revolutionary and education reformer Ion Maiorescu. The current school building was started in 1895 and completed the following year. During World War I, between 1916 and 1918, the school was closed, with teachers protesting its occupation by German troops.

With the addition of another grade, the gymnasium became a high school in 1919. Its new status was enshrined by law in 1923, when the full complement of grades started to function. The institution acquired significant prestige in the interwar period, with renowned teachers, strict discipline and a high level of learning.

In 1948, the new communist regime reduced the course to eleven grades; the next set of 12th-graders would not graduate until 1969. A new wing was added in 1957–1959, while the gymnasium dates to 1976. The number of faculty rose from 33 to 44 from 1968 to 1969, reflecting a rise in the student population. In 1996, following the Romanian Revolution, it was declared a national college.

The school building is listed as a historic monument by Romania's Ministry of Culture and Religious Affairs.

== Faculty and alumni ==
=== Faculty ===
- Nicolae Cartojan
- Traian Lalescu

=== Alumni ===
- Nicolae Dărăscu
- Tudor Vianu
