= Valeriu Alaci =

Valeriu Alaci (October 22, 1884–1955) was an Austro-Hungarian-born Romanian mathematician.

Alaci was a native of Cacica, a village in the Duchy of Bukovina. Having lost his father at the age of 3, his mother returned to her hometown, Vaslui, where Valeriu Alaci attended primary school and the Mihail Kogălniceanu Gymnasium. He completed his secondary education at the Roșca Codreanu High School in Bârlad, which he graduated in 1905. He then attended the sciences faculty of the University of Bucharest in the Romanian Old Kingdom, graduating in 1909. He taught mathematics at Dimitrie Cantemir High School in Bucharest and Mircea cel Bătrân High School in Constanța. In 1916–1918, during World War I, he taught at a refugee camp in Sculeni, near Iași. In 1921, he obtained his PhD from the University of Bucharest, with thesis advisor Traian Lalescu, after which he became a professor at Politehnica University of Timișoara.

He died in Timișoara. A street in this city is named after him.
