= Itești =

- Commune
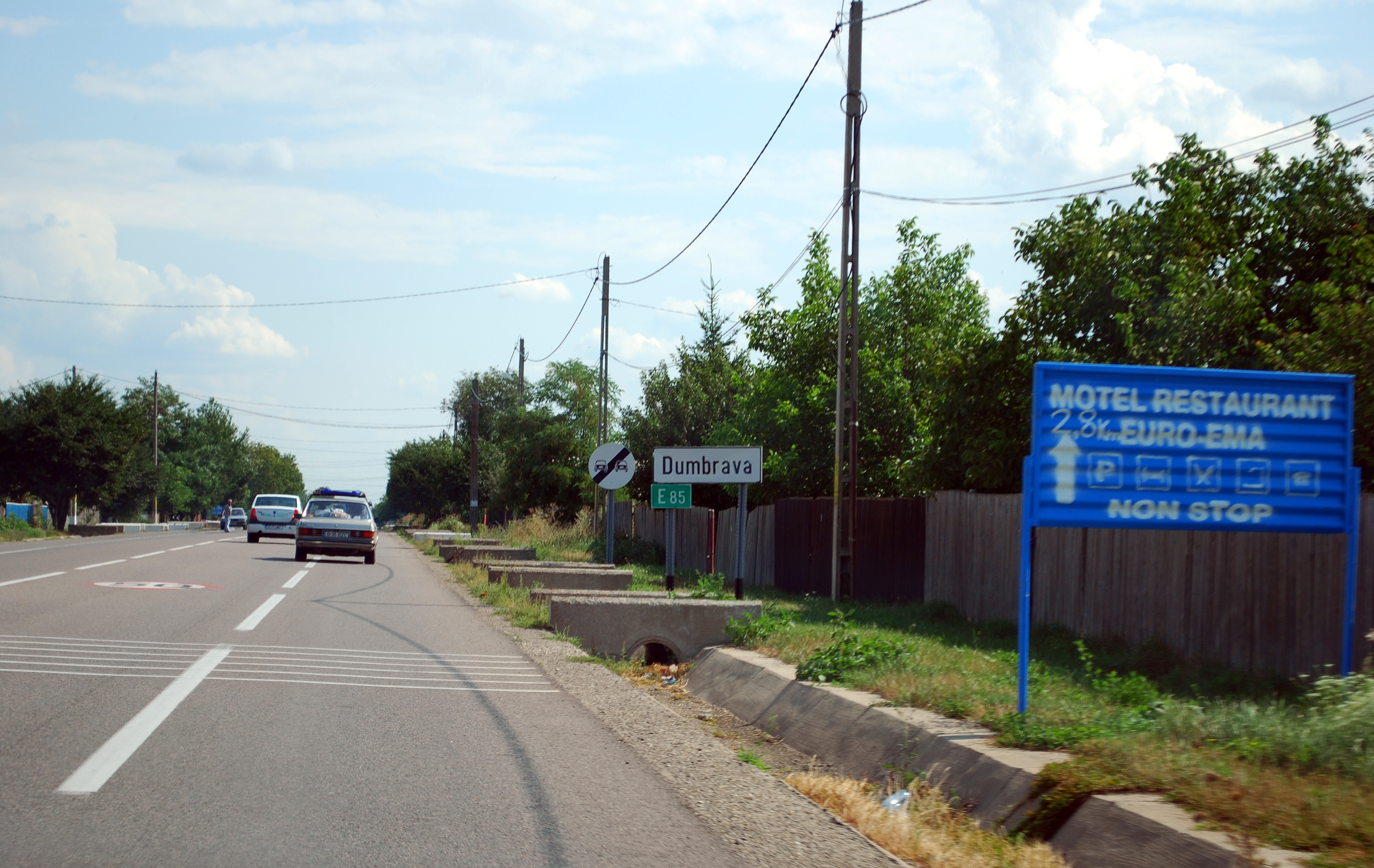
- The DN2 road entering the village of Dumbrava

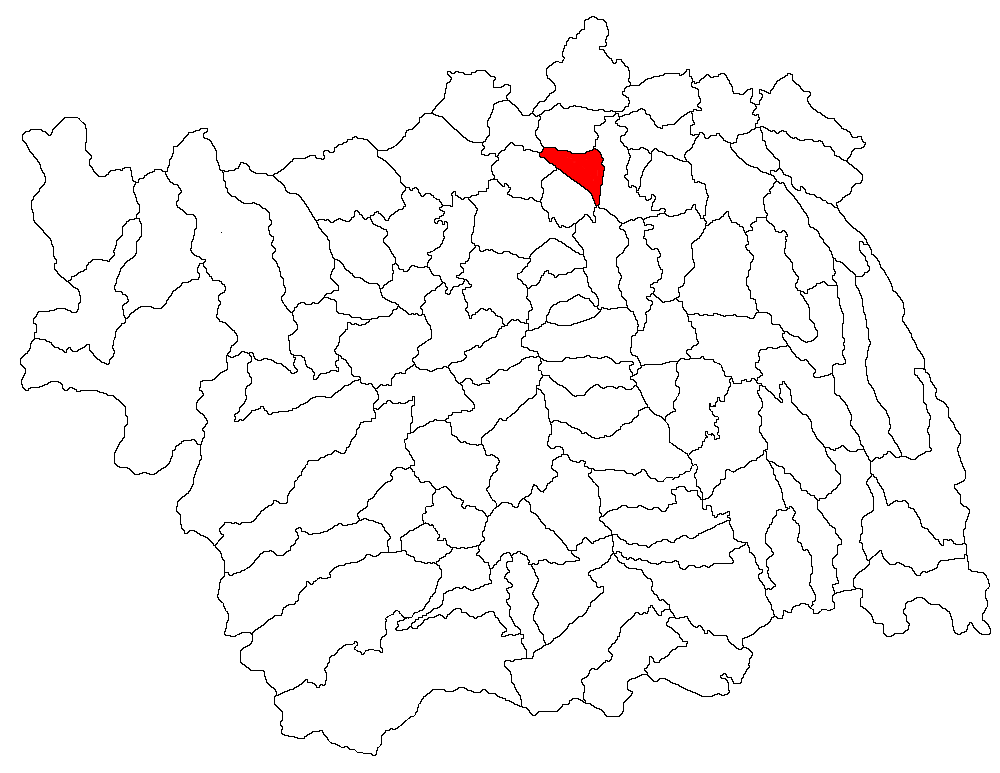
- Location in Bacău County

- Location in Romania
- Coordinates: 46°39′N 26°52′E
- Country: Romania
- County: Bacău

Government
  - Mayor (2024–2028): Norocel Călin Ciubotaru (PNL)
- Area: 36.2 km^{2} (14.0 sq mi)
- Elevation: 240 m (790 ft)
- Population (2021-12-01): 1,374
  - Density: 38.0/km^{2} (98.3/sq mi)
- Time zone: UTC+02:00 (EET)
  - Summer (DST): UTC+03:00 (EEST)
- Postal code: 607047
- Area code: +(40) 234
- Vehicle reg.: BC
- Website: comunaitestibacau.ro

Itești is a commune in Bacău County, Western Moldavia, Romania. It is composed of four villages: Ciumași, Dumbrava, Făgețel, and Itești. These were part of Berești-Bistrița Commune until 2005, when they were split off.

== Natives ==
- Constantin Avram (1911–1987), structural engineer
