= Lucian Georgevici =

Austro-Hungarian-born Romanian lawyer and politician

Lucian Georgevici (January 16, 1875–February 9, 1940) was an Austro-Hungarian-born Romanian lawyer and politician.

Born in Ictar, Timiș County, in the Banat region, his parents were George and Cristina Georgevici. He attended the primary grades at a church school in his native village, followed by high school in Timișoara, Lugoj and Beiuș, taking his graduating examination at Samuil Vulcan High School in the latter town. His parents would have liked him to be a priest, but he chose to attend the law academy in Oradea, and took his examination at the law faculty of Franz Joseph University in Cluj. After performing his military service, he returned to the Banat upon his parents' insistence, settling in Timișoara. He was a lawyer's intern from January 1902 to August 1905; he spent the second half of this period in the office of activist Emanuil Ungurianu.

Subsequently, admitted to the bar, he opened a lawyer's office in Recaș in November 1905 and became involved in the Romanian national movement. He soon attracted a large clientele, defending numerous peasants from lawsuits and helping them purchase land put up for sale in the surrounding villages. He contributed funds to village reading rooms and choirs, and was very active in the Ungurianu-headed Timișoara chapter of Astra, which expanded into the Banat in 1896. During the 1906 Hungarian parliamentary election, he campaigned on behalf of the candidate of the Romanian National Party (PNR), who lost the race. In 1910, he again campaigned on behalf of the party's candidate, who was forced to withdraw by the authorities. Georgevici was drafted into the Austro-Hungarian Army during World War I, where he saw action on the Serbian and Italian fronts as a captain. At the end of the war, he was in the Timișoara garrison.

The city was in a tense and uncertain position, and on October 31, 1918, an ad-hoc committee presided over by Aurel Cosma selected Georgevici as commander of the area's Romanian national guards. On November 25, he was elected among the district's representatives to the Great National Assembly at Alba Iulia. He arrived there on November 30, the day before the union of Transylvania with Romania was approved. Together with other regional delegates, he emphasized that the Banat, recently occupied by the Serbian Army, should form part of Romania. After returning home, he helped found Bănatul newspaper in order to promote the Romanian cause; it started running the following February. Georgevici was publisher and the editors were allowed to use a room in his lawyer's office. In the summer of 1919, after the Versailles Peace Conference had decided that the eastern part of the Banat should be part of Romania, he helped set up the central administration in Timiș-Torontal County. After giving a loyalty oath, he continued his lawyer's activity. At the November 1919 election, the first held in Greater Romania, he won a seat for the Assembly of Deputies in the Recaș district, forming part of the Alexandru Vaida-Voevod-led majority. In October 1920, after the Vaida-Voevod government had fallen, Georgevici followed Cosma and the rest of the Timiș-Torontal PNR chapter into the National Liberal Party (PNL).

In August 1922, with the PNL by then in power, Georgevici was named mayor of Timișoara. During his term, a tramway line was completed, many streets paved, the abattoir modernized, new schoolrooms inaugurated and dormitories for students and workers begun. His adversaries charged him with serious acts of corruption, to which Georgevici responded by calling for an investigation. In December 1925, one of his accusers was jailed and fined for calumny. He served until April 1926, when he resigned after the party had been ousted, and resumed the practice of law for another year. At the June 1927 election, which the PNL won with a strong majority, he was re-elected deputy, but in September, returned as mayor. He remained in that office until January 1929, after the PNL again left government. He again worked as a lawyer in Timișoara from February 1929 to August 1930, and then in Recaș until May 1935. At that point, he was excluded from the bar because he had taken a position as a notary public in Reșița, a position he held until his death. He died in the latter city and was taken to the Fabric district of Timișoara, where he was buried following a Romanian Orthodox funeral.
