= Constantin Avram =

Romanian structural engineer

Constantin Avram (February 19, 1911 – February 20, 1987) was a Romanian structural engineer.

Born in Ciumași, Bacău County, his parents Nicolai and Maria were peasants; in addition, his father was a mechanic for Căile Ferate Române. The couple worked hard for their children's education; their four sons all earned university degrees, with three becoming structural engineers and the fourth a chemical engineer. Constantin attended Ferdinand I High School in Bacău from 1923 to 1930. He then enrolled in the military engineers officers' school in Bucharest, graduating first in his class in 1932 and becoming a second lieutenant in the Romanian Army. After a yearlong internship, he was sent on a government scholarship to the École militaire et d'application du génie de Versailles. Upon his return home, he attended the construction faculty of the Bucharest Polytechnic School. In 1940, he graduated first in his class and earned a degree as a structural engineer. He married Emilia Petrescu in 1939.

In October 1940, he became a teaching assistant at the Polytechnic's reinforced concrete building department. In February 1948, following the onset of the communist regime, he was transferred as a full professor to the construction faculty of the Polytechnic University of Timișoara. There, his teaching focused on reinforced concrete until his retirement in 1975. Other fields he taught included reinforced concrete bridges; statics (1948-1950); material resistance and the theory of elasticity (1948-1953); statics and dynamics of construction (1960-1963). He helped set up a construction faculty at the Cluj Polytechnic Institute, where he taught reinforced concrete from 1954 to 1959, commuting between Timișoara and Cluj. He became a doctoral adviser in 1952, guiding dozens of students through the process.

He wrote a number of textbooks in his field, and, either alone or in collaboration, authored some 110 scientific publications. He was chairman of the reinforced concrete and building department from 1953 to 1975, and rector at Timișoara from 1963 to 1971. In 1963, he was elected a corresponding member of the Romanian Academy. In his limited spare time, he read classic literature and was a passionate supporter of Poli Timișoara football team. He died in 1987.
