= Nicolae Robu =

Romanian politician and engineer

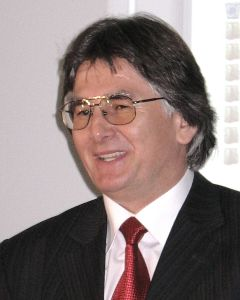

Mayor of Timișoara
- In office 10 July 2012 – 27 October 2020
- Preceded by: Gheorghe Ciuhandu
- Succeeded by: Dominic Fritz

Senator in Romanian Parliament
- In office 19 December 2008 – 22 June 2012

Former President of PNL Timiș
- In office March 2010 – September 2020

Former rector of Politechnic Institute of Timișoara
- In office 2004–2012

Vice-president of National Council of Rectors
- Incumbent
- Assumed office 2008

Member of Parliamentary Assembly of the Council of Europe

Member of PNL National Executive Council

Member of PNL Central Political Bureau

Personal details
- Born: 28 May 1955 (age 70) Bocsig, Arad County, Romania
- Party: National Liberal Party (PNL)
- Spouse: Florica Robu
- Children: 2

Nicolae Robu (born May 28, 1955) is a Romanian politician, engineer, and computer science professor.

He was mayor of Timișoara from 2012 until 2020 and the former president of PNL Timiș. He served as rector of the Politehnica University of Timișoara from 2004 to 2012 and prorector from 1990 to 2000. He also sat in the Senate for Timiș County from 2008 to 2012. He is a member of the National Liberal Party (PNL).

Born in Bocsig, Arad County, he attended the Politehnica University of Timișoara from 1975 to 1980, earning a doctorate from the same institution in 1995, in the field of automatic control systems. He worked as an engineer in Timișoara from 1980 to 1985 before becoming a scientific researcher with the Institute for Automatic Research in the city. In 1986, he began teaching at his alma mater, becoming a university professor in 1997. He was assistant rector of the university from 1990 to 2004, serving as rector from 2004 to 2012.

In 2008, he was elected to the Romanian Senate for Timiș County; he sat on the education committee. He resigned his seat in June 2012. That month, at the local election, he won the race to be mayor of Timișoara while running on the lists of the Social Liberal Union. He took 49.8% of the vote, with his nearest rival winning 23.4%. Within his party, he has headed the president of the Timiș County chapter since 2009, and has sat on the central political bureau since 2011.

Robu is married and has two children, Andreea Robu and Raul Robu.
