= Iulius Iancu =

Romanian Jewish poet and writer

Iulius Iancu יוליוס ינקו
- Drawing by Rubinstein
- Born: March 24, 1920; Bacău, Kingdom of Romania
- Died: April 3, 2013 (aged 93); Haifa, Israel
- Occupations: Physician and writer

Dr. Iulius Iancu (Romanian pronunciation: [ˈjuljus ˈjaŋku]; Hebrew: יוליוס ינקו; born March 24, 1920, died April 3, 2013) was a Jewish poet and writer writing in Romanian.

== Biography ==
Iancu was born on 24 March 1920 in the town of Bacău, in eastern Romania. He spent his childhood according to Jewish traditions. He graduated from Ferdinand I High School in Bacău and then earned a degree in medicine from the University of Bucharest in 1949. He practised medicine for 50 years as a radiologist, publishing numerous studies and articles in his domain of medicine, some of them quoted in classical manuals. Between 1999 and 2004, he published the four volumes of his memoir, Noi, Copii Străzii Leca, which was awarded prizes and was praised by a number of political and literary personalities from Israel and abroad. In 2005, he published his first volume of verse, Poeme De Amurg, which was also appreciated for its literary qualities. He frequently wrote for publications in Israel, Romania, and Canada. Studies about his writings were published in the volumes Scriitori Din Țara Sfântă by Ion Cristofor, Dicționar Neconvenţional Al Scriitorilor Evrei De Limba Română by Alexandru Mirodan, Medici, Scriitori Și Publiciști by Dr. M. Mihailide, Bacăul Literar by Eugen Budău and Medici Scriitori by Dr. I. Marton. Iancu was a member of Asociația Medicilor Scriitori/ The Association Of The Doctors Writers of Romania, of The 'Haifa' Literary Club and of The 'Șai Agnon' Cultural Club.

== Literary career ==
- Târgul amintirilor (1940) – single copy, lost now
- Poveste naivă (1998) – family edition – exhausted
- Evenimente în desene (2000) – single copy
- "Noi, copiii strazii Leca" (English: "We are Leca street children", Hebrew: "אנחנו ילדי לקה") Volumes 1–4
- Editura Minimum Israel
  - Vol. I – Târgul amintirilor (1999)
  - Vol. II – Un om, un drum, o epocă (2001)
  - Vol. III – Bacăul de odinioară (2002)
  - Vol. IV – Generația de la capătul drumului (2005)
- Din jurnalul unui pensionar (English: The journal of a pensioner, Hebrew: מיומנו של פנסיונר), written in 2006.
- Poeme de amurg – vol. I (2006)
- Poeme de amurg – vol. II: Aştept ziua de mâine (2007)
- "Printesa din Harduf" (English: "The Princess of Harduf", Hebrew: הנסיכה מהרדוף), a book about facing the Alzheimer's disease. The book was published in Romanian at 2009 and was translated to English by Mariana Zavati Gardner and her daughter.

== Magazine publications ==
- "Viața noastră", Israel, nr.15/2000
- "Semnalul", din Canada, nr.64/2000
- "Minimum", nr.187/2002;
- "Orient Expres", 5 Dec. 2005;
- "Magazin"
- "Jurnalul Săptămânii"

== The Princess of Harduf ==
The "Prințesa din Harduf" cover

The Princess of Harduf is a book about survival and understanding, about hope and loss. It is about the journey made by Iancu and his wife Rita, shoulder to shoulder through life and ultimately stoically facing her Alzheimer together. The volume is written with immense compassion from the point of view of the doctor and with the deep love of the husband, protector of a vulnerable wife. Mixing the diary format with the documentary notes, The Princess of Harduf is written in the first person with the energy of despair at a crescendo pace. It tells the real story of Rita's becoming swamped by Alzheimer and plunging into her own reality with space for one person only, with family and friends locked outside. The narrative reveals how Rita's reality has gradually been stripped away. Iancu narrates about his wife's transformation and descent into darkness, from the unnoticed building up of the symptoms and to the obvious. The emphasis is on the way members of the family and paid help assist Rita. Domestic detail mixes with medical detail. Rita's ongoing transformation is followed by sequences of precise medical notes combined with the deepest emotions. The Princess of Harduf is deeply touching as it captures the ability of the human spirit to overcome momentous difficulties.

== Works in preparation ==
- Opinii literare (cărți și cărturari)
- Din jurnalul unui pensionar – vol.II
- Despărțiri (poezii)

== Awards ==
- Fundația 'Sara & Haim Ianculovici' 2001
- Fundația 'Iacob Groper' 2008

== Memberships ==
- The 'Haifa' Cultural Club
- 'Șai Agnon' Cultural Club
- Societatea medicilor scriitori din România și Europa

== Critical studies ==
- Ion Cristofor Filipas – Scrisori Din Țara Sfânta
- Al. Mirodan – Dictionar Neconventional Al Scriitorilor Evrei De Limba Româna
- Dr. M. Mihailide – Medici, Scriitori Si Publicisti
- Eugen Budău – Bacaul Literar
- Dr. I. Marton – Medici Scriitori
- Ion Cristofor Filipas – Cetatea Culturală/ Cluj-Napoca 2008

== Dr. Iulius Iancu's work was included in ==
- The Muses Visit (album) Ed. Teva 2005
- Ateneul Personalitatilor Bacauane 'Vasile Alecsandri' Bacău (permanent documentary presentation)
- Expozitia Medicilor Desenatori Tel-Aviv 2009
- Yad Vashem (Library – Testimonies)
- Muzeul Evreiesc Bacău – Permanent Display
- A.C.M.E.O.R. Library Tel-Aviv
- The National University Library – Jerusalem
- The Hebrew University Library – Jerusalem
- The 'Eugen Budau' Regional Library – Bacău
- Biblioteca Academiei Romane – București

== External links (in Romanian) ==
- Un poet sentimental ION CRISTOFOR
- Aştept ziua de mâine de Cornel Galben
- Poeme de amurg de Cornel Galben
- Liviu Moscovici primit de la autor bianca marcovici
