= Bocsig =

- Commune
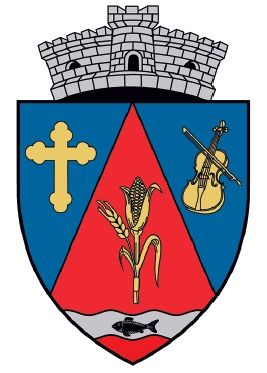
- Coat of arms

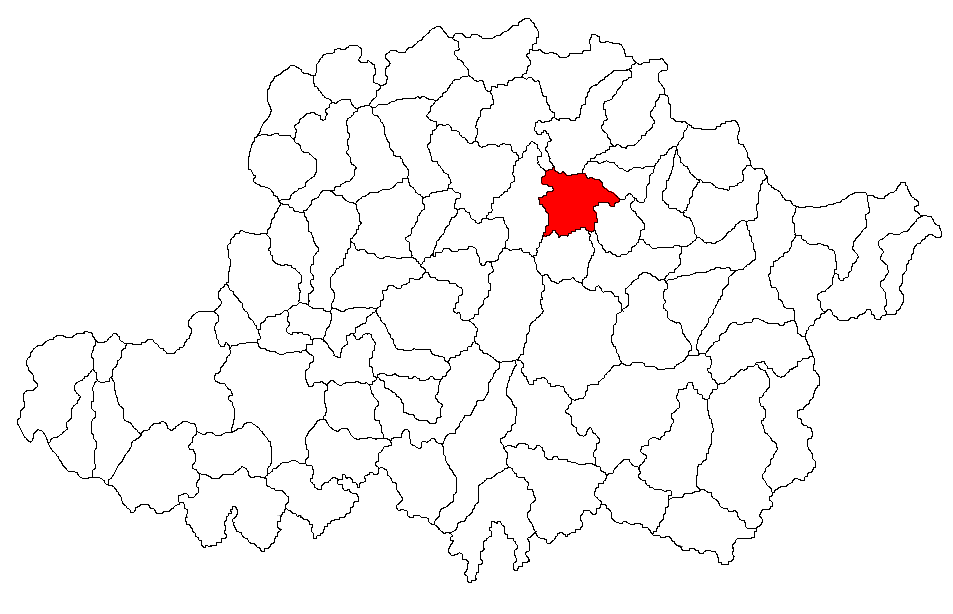
- Location in Arad County

- Location in Romania
- Coordinates: 46°25′N 21°57′E
- Country: Romania
- County: Arad

Government
  - Mayor (2020–2024): Teodora Abrudean (PNL)
- Area: 74.79 km^{2} (28.88 sq mi)
- Elevation: 122 m (400 ft)
- Population (2021-12-01): 3,068
  - Density: 41/km^{2} (110/sq mi)
- Time zone: EET/EEST (UTC+2/+3)
- Postal code: 317055
- Area code: (+40) 0257
- Vehicle reg.: AR
- Website: bocsig.ro

Bocsig (Hungarian: Bokszeg) is a commune in Arad County, Romania. The commune is situated in the Ineu Basin, along the Crișul Alb River, and it stretches over 74.79 km^{2} (28.88 sq mi). It is composed of three villages: Bocsig (situated at 67 km (42 mi) from Arad), Mânerău (Monyoró), and Răpsig (Repszeg).

== Population ==
At the 2002 census, the commune had 3,553 inhabitants, out of which 90.3% were Romanians, 6.8% Roma, 2.7% Hungarians, and 0.2% of other or undeclared nationalities. At the 2021 census, Bocsig had a population of 3,068; of those, 91.3% were Romanians and 2.15% Roma.

== History ==
The first documentary record of the locality Bocsig dates back to 1553. Mânerău was mentioned in documents in 1341, while Răpsig in 1553.

== Natives ==
- Nicolae Robu (born 1955), politician, engineer, and computer science professor
- Ion Vidu (1863–1931), composer and choral conductor

== Economy ==
Although the economy of the commune is mainly agricultural, the secondary and tertiary economic sectors have also developed since the 1990s.

== Tourism ==
There is a castle in Bocsig, built in the 19th century in late Renaissance style. The commune is also on the Crișul Alb River valley.
