= Berești-Bistrița =

- Commune
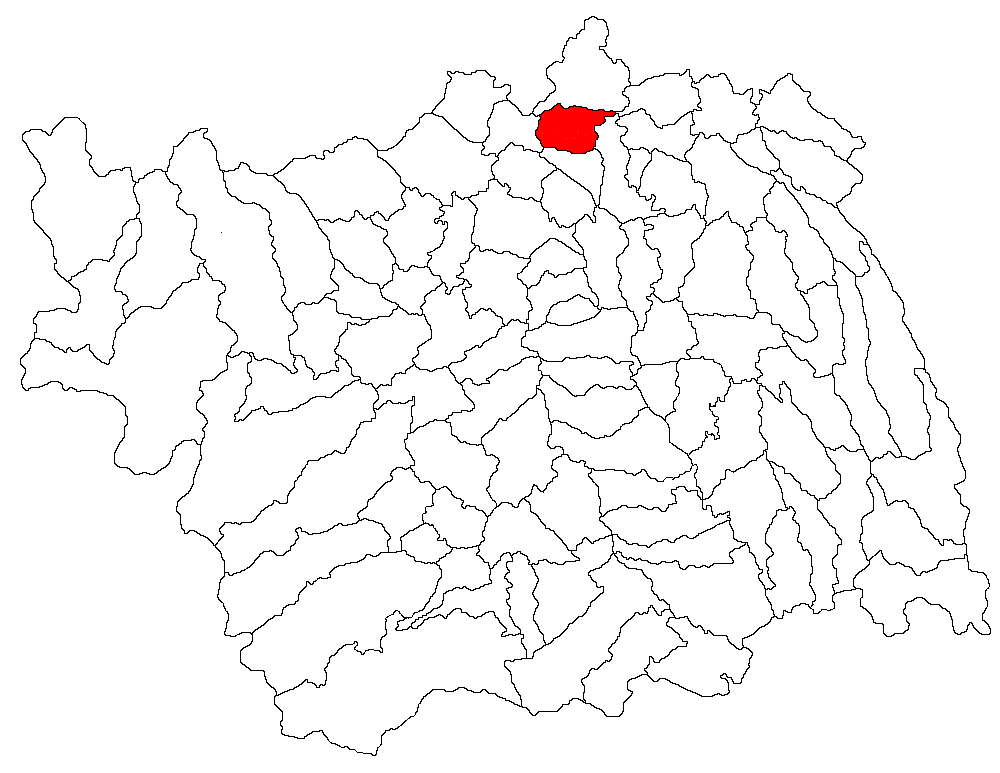
- Location in Bacău County

- Location in Romania
- Coordinates: 46°43′N 26°50′E
- Country: Romania
- County: Bacău

Government
  - Mayor (2024–2028): Ionel Alcaz (PSD)
- Area: 37.69 km^{2} (14.55 sq mi)
- Elevation: 237 m (778 ft)
- Population (2021-12-01): 2,175
  - Density: 58/km^{2} (150/sq mi)
- Time zone: EET/EEST (UTC+2/+3)
- Postal code: 607040
- Area code: +(40) 234
- Vehicle reg.: BC
- Website: primariaberestibistrita.ro

Berești-Bistrița is a commune in Bacău County, Western Moldavia, Romania. It is composed of four villages: Berești-Bistrița, Brad, Climești, and Pădureni. It also included Ciumași, Dumbrava, Făgețel and Itești villages until 2005, when they were split off to form Itești Commune.

Historical population
Year	Pop.	±%
2002	2,024	—
2011	1,983	−2.0%
2021	2,175	+9.7%
Source: Census data
