= Carol Telbisz =

Austro-Hungarian public figure and mayor of Banat Bulgarian origin

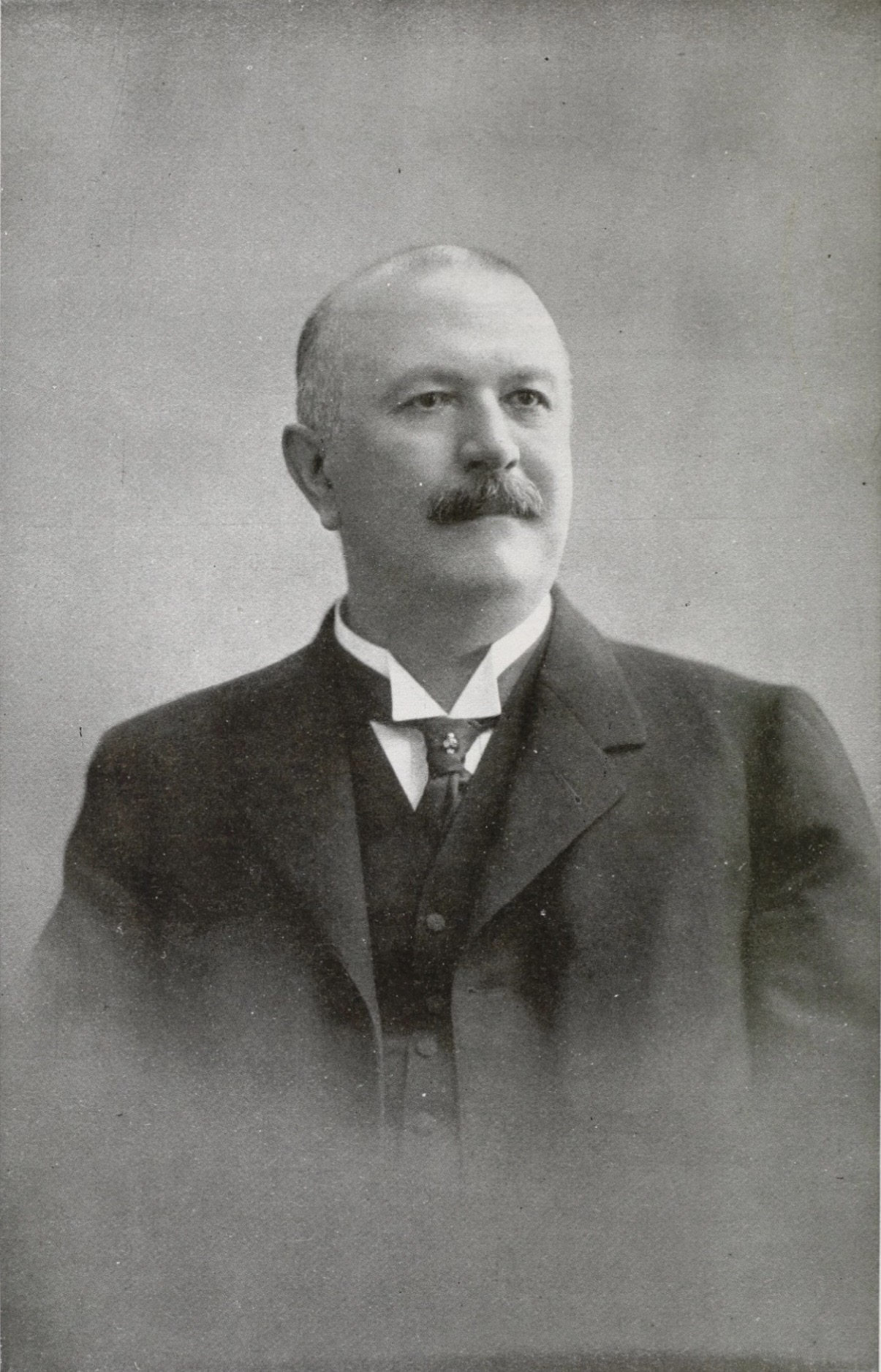
- Carol Telbisz in Magyarország vármegyéi és városai: Temesvár

Mayor of Timișoara
- In office 1885–1914
- Preceded by: János Török

Personal details
- Born: 19 November 1854 Őscsanád, Austrian Empire
- Died: 14 July 1914 (aged 59) Pörtschach am Wörther See, Austria-Hungary
- Party: Liberal Party

Carol Telbisz (Hungarian: Telbisz Károly, German: Karl Telbisz, Romanian: Carol Telbisz, Bulgarian: Карол Телбиз) (1853 – 14 July 1914) was an Austro-Hungarian public figure of Banat Bulgarian origin and a long-time Mayor of Temesvár (modern Timișoara, Romania).

== Biography ==
Born in Nagycsanád, Kingdom of Hungary, Austrian Empire (today Cenad, Romania), and descending from the old Banat Bulgarian family of Telbiz from Stár Bišnov (today Dudeștii Vechi, Romania), Telbisz graduated in law from the University of Budapest and later took a doctor's degree in administrative law from the University of Vienna. He was awarded the noble title of Baron.

Between 1885 and 1914, Telbisz was mayor of Temesvár, the capital of the Banat. During his term in office, he contributed a great deal to the city's modernization, destroying the old fortifications and reshaping the city according to a new Western European urbanization plan, with wide boulevards, sewerage, water supply, electrification and an electric-powered rail public transport. During his term in office, Temesvár boasted the earliest first aid station in modern Hungary besides the first asphalt-paved street (1895) and the first electric tram (1899) in what is today Romania. Upon the end of his mayoralty, some considered Timișoara as Austria-Hungary's third city in importance, after Vienna and Budapest.
