= Victor Vâlcovici =

Romanian mechanician and mathematician

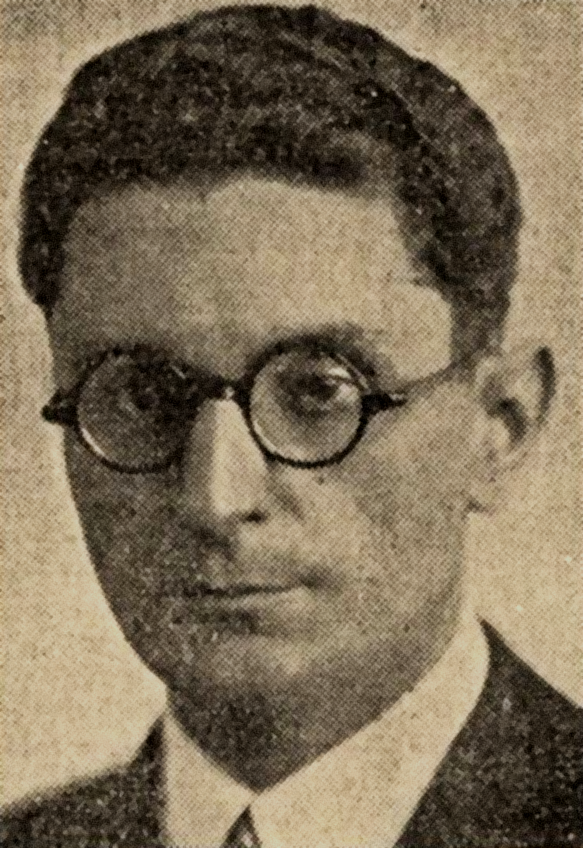
- Vâlcovici in the 1930s
- Born: September 21, 1885; Galați, Kingdom of Romania
- Died: 21 June 1970 (aged 84); Bucharest, Socialist Republic of Romania
- Resting place: Bellu Cemetery, Bucharest
- Education: Nicolae Bălcescu High School
- Alma mater: University of Bucharest; University of Göttingen
- Scientific career
- Fields: Mathematics, Mechanics
- Institutions: University of Iași; Polytechnic School of Timișoara; University of Bucharest
- Thesis: Ueber die diskontinuierliche Flussigkeitsbewegungen mit zwei freien Strahlen (1913)
- Doctoral advisor: Ludwig Prandtl

Minister of Public Works and Communications
- In office April 18, 1931 – June 5, 1932
- Prime Minister: Nicolae Iorga
- Preceded by: Ion Răducanu
- Succeeded by: Gheorghe Mironescu

Minister of Justice
- In office January 7 – January 9, 1932
- Prime Minister: Nicolae Iorga
- Preceded by: Constantin Hamangiu
- Succeeded by: Valer Pop

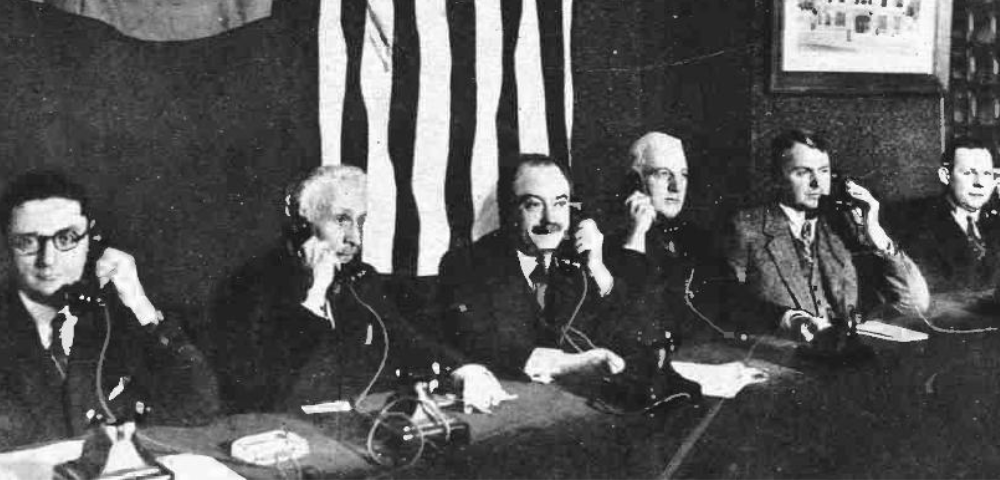
The first-ever call from Bucharest to New York City, on December 25, 1931. Vâlcovici is first from the left, followed by Dimitrie I. Ghika, the Minister of Foreign Affairs, and Grigore Filipescu, president of the Romanian Telephone Company

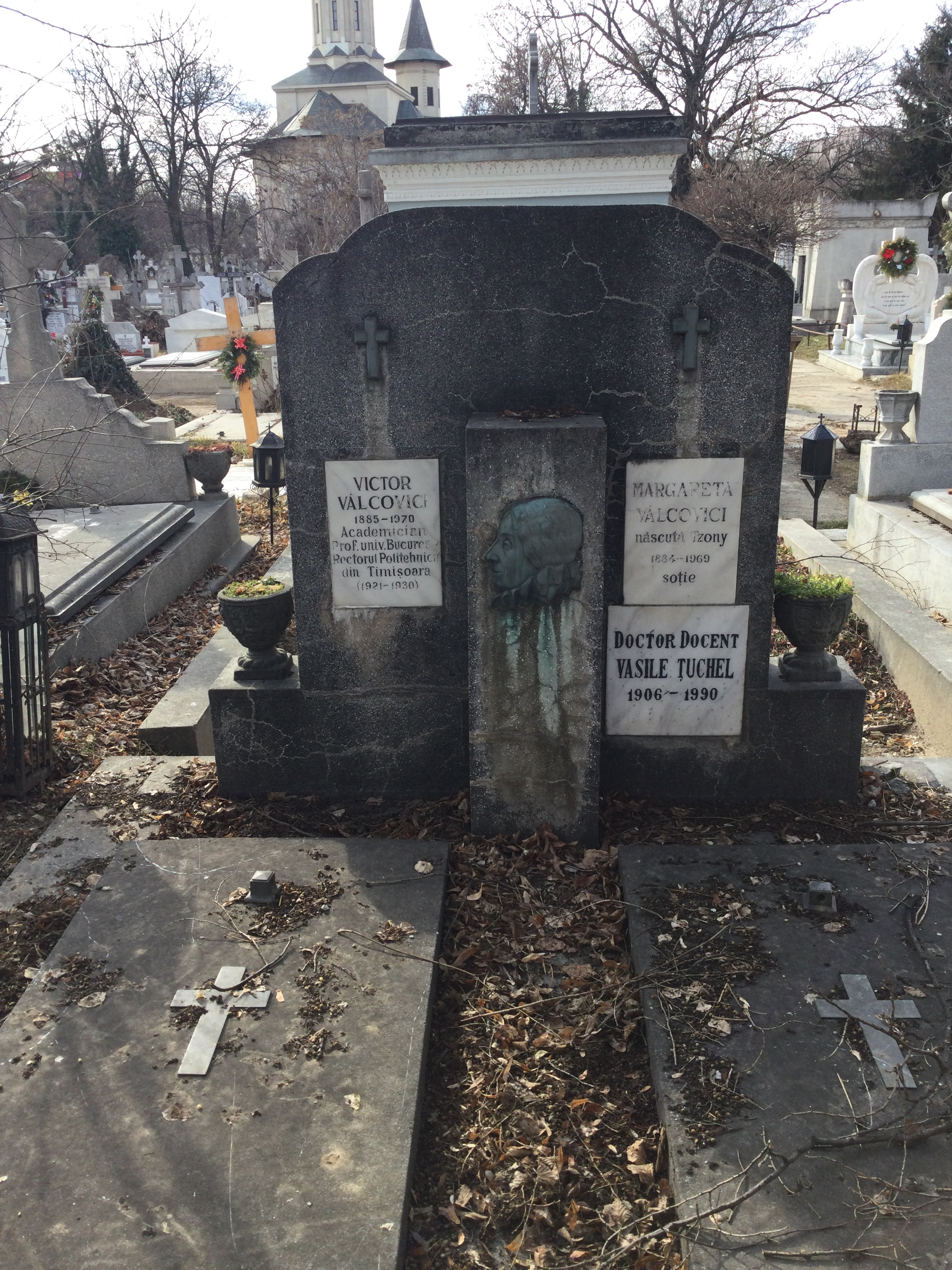
Grave at Bellu Cemetery

Victor Vâlcovici (21 September [O.S. 9 September] 1885 – 21 June 1970) was a Romanian mechanician and mathematician.

== Biography ==
Born into a modest family in Galați, he graduated first in his class in 1904 from Nicolae Bălcescu High School in Brăila. Entering the University of Bucharest on a scholarship, he attended its faculty of sciences, where he had as teachers Spiru Haret and Gheorghe Țițeica. After graduating in 1907 with a degree in mathematics, he taught high school for two years before leaving for University of Göttingen on another scholarship to pursue a doctorate in mathematics. He wrote his thesis under the direction of Ludwig Prandtl and defended it in 1913; the thesis, titled Ueber die diskontinuierliche Flussigkeitsbewegungen mit zwei freien Strahlen (Discontinuous flow of liquids in two free dimensions), amplified upon the work of Bernhard Riemann.

He was subsequently named assistant professor of mechanics at the University of Iași, rising to full professor in 1918. In 1921, he became rector of the Polytechnic School of Timișoara. There, he was also professor of rational mechanics and founded a laboratory dedicated to the field. During his nine years as rector, he worked to place the recently founded university on a solid foundation. From 1930 until retiring in 1962, he taught experimental mechanics at the University of Bucharest. In the government of Nicolae Iorga, he served as Minister of Public Works from 1931 to 1932. During this time, he introduced a modern road network that featured paved highways. In 1936 he gave an invited talk at the International Congress of Mathematicians in Oslo, with title Sur le sillage derrière un obstacle circulaire (In the wake of a circular obstacle).

Elected a corresponding member of the Romanian Academy in 1936, he was stripped of his membership by the new communist regime in 1948, but made a titular member of the Romanian Academy in 1965. His numerous articles on theoretical and applied mechanics covered topics such as the principles of variational mechanics, the mechanics of ideal fluid flow, the theory of elasticity and astronomy.

He died in 1970 in Bucharest, and was buried in the city's Bellu Cemetery. Streets have been named after Victor Vâlcovici in Brăila, Galați, and Timișoara; a school in Galați also bears his name.

== Books ==
- Vâlcovici, Victor (1958). Une extension des liaisons non holonomes et des principes variationnels (in French). De Gruyter. doi:10.1515/9783112498545. ISBN 978-3-11-249854-5. MR 0090218. S2CID 118604371.
- Vâlcovici, Victor (1971). Mecanica fluidelor și teoria elasticității (in Romanian). București: Editura Academiei Republicii Socialiste România. OCLC 886523167.

== Notes ==
Preceded by Traian Lalescu	Rector of the Polytechnic University of Timișoara; 1921–1930	Succeeded by Victor Blăsian
