= Politehnica University of Timișoara =

University in Romania

- Universitatea Politehnica Timișoara
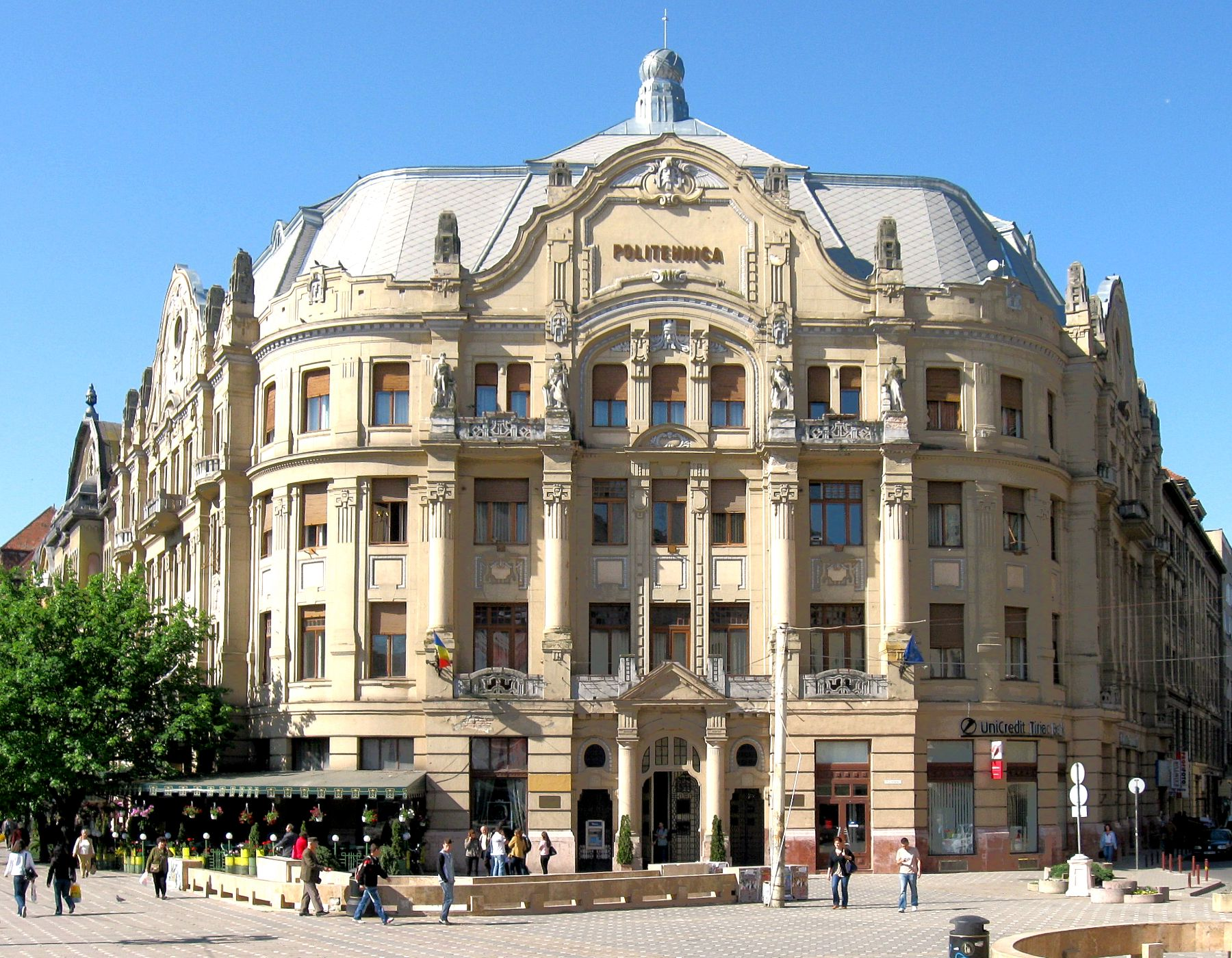
- The rectorate in Victory Square
- Former names: Polytechnic School (1920–1948); Polytechnic Institute (1948–1970); Traian Vuia Polytechnic Institute (1970–1991); Technical University (1991–1995)
- Motto: Nu zidurile fac o școală, ci spiritul care domnește într-însa
- Motto in English: "It is not the walls that make a school, but the spirit that reigns in it"
- Type: Public
- Established: 15 November 1920; 105 years ago
- Budget: RON 284,325,514 (2020/2021)
- Rector: Florin Drăgan
- Academic staff: 1,016 (2020/2021)
- Students: 13,081 (2020/2021)
- Undergraduates: 9,577 (2020/2021)
- Postgraduates: 2,964 (2020/2021)
- Doctoral students: 540 (2020/2021)
- Location: Timișoara, Timiș, Romania; 45°45′12″N 21°13′29″E
- Campus: Urban
- Colors: White and blue
- Website: upt.ro

University rankings

Global – Overall
- QS World: 1401+ (2024)
- THE World: 1501+ (2024)

Politehnica University of Timișoara (Romanian: Universitatea Politehnica Timișoara; abbreviated UPT) is a public university in Timișoara. Founded in 1920, it is one of the largest technical universities in Central and Eastern Europe. The 10 faculties of the university provide study programs for about 13,000 students. In 2011, Politehnica University of Timișoara was classified as an advanced research and education university by the Ministry of Education. The university is a founding member of the Romanian Alliance of Technical Universities (ARUT).

== History ==
=== 1920–1948: Polytechnic School ===
The idea of establishing a polytechnic school in Timișoara appeared since the beginning of the 20th century, the Austro-Hungarian Empire wanting both the industrial development of Banat and offering a reason for satisfaction to the majority Romanian population. Following the proposal of the City Council meeting of 26 November 1906, in 1907 mayor Carol Telbisz submitted a memorandum to the Ministry of Public Instruction in Budapest on the need for a polytechnic school. But the Minister of Instruction's proposal to the Budapest Parliament in 1911 was rejected. However, the ministry delegated a commission consisting of the rector of the Budapest Polytechnic and nine professors to deal with the issue together with the Timișoara City Hall. Proceedings resumed in 1916, but were blocked by World War I. However, on 23 November 1917, the City Hall decided to cede an 8-hectare plot of land on the left bank of the Bega for the Polytechnic buildings and to arrange the building of a school or a barracks for the temporary operation of the school. After the war, at the insistence of Emanuil Ungureanu, on 27 February 1919, the mayor Stan Vidrighin submitted to the Governing Council, the Resort of Cults and Instruction, a memorandum requesting the establishment of the school. The Governing Council decided to establish the Polytechnic on 27 February 1920, and according to the Official Gazette no. 3191 of 22 October 1920, the Romanian Council of Ministers approved the establishment starting with 15 November 1920, allocating one million lei. The decree, with no. 44822, was countersigned by King Ferdinand I on 11 November.

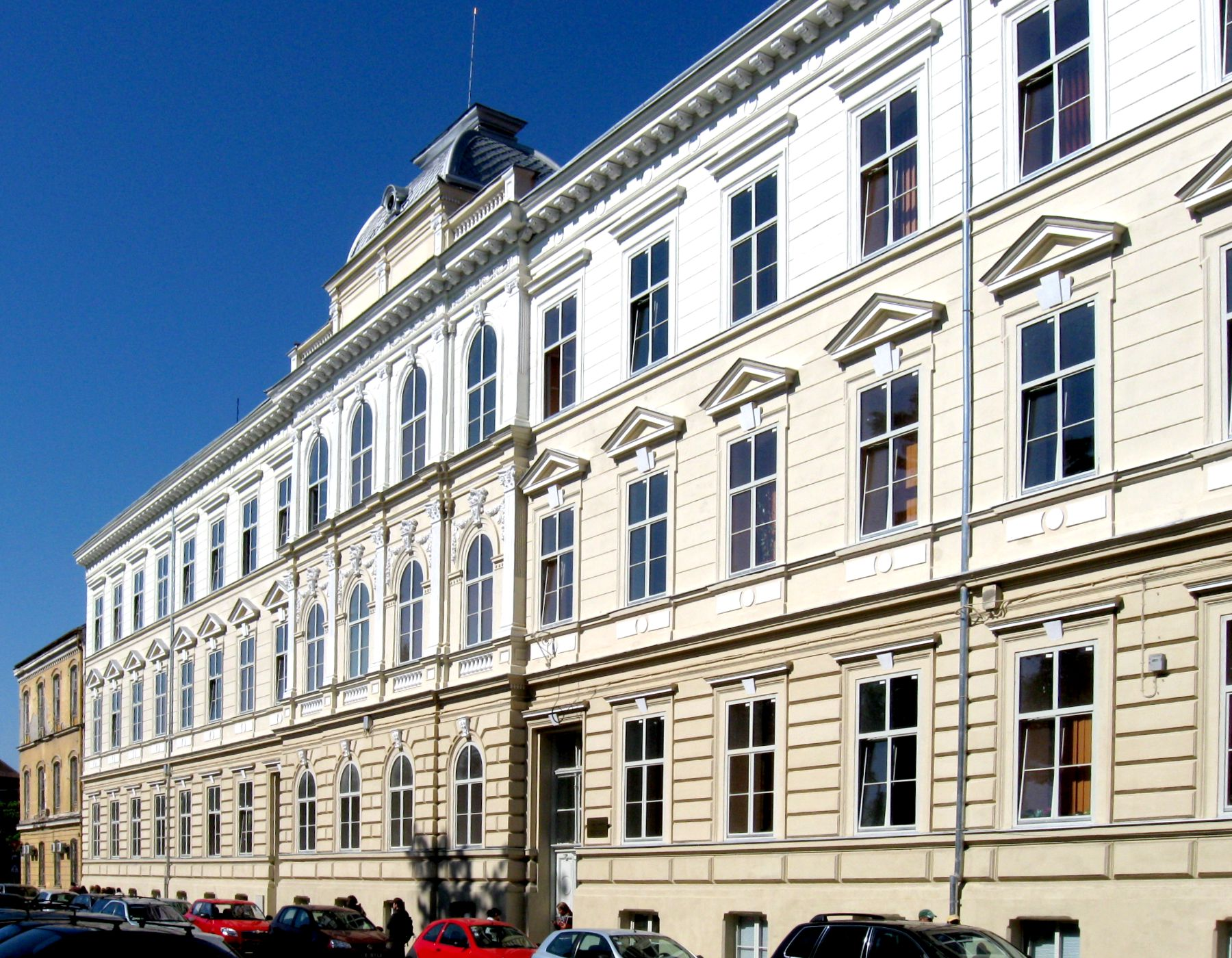
The building on Carol Telbisz Street, where the first classes were held

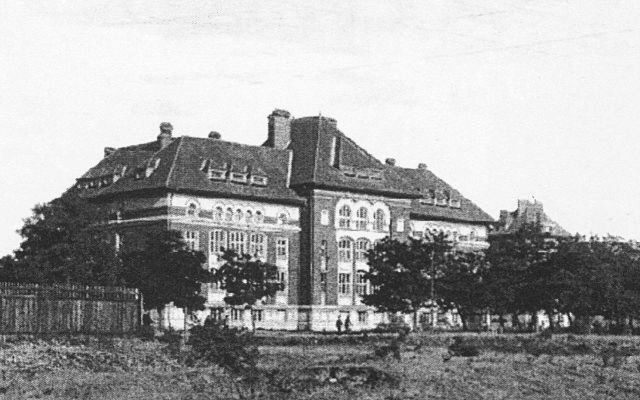
The building on Michel the Great Boulevard in 1923, currently the headquarters of the Faculty of Mechanics

At first, as the school did not have its own headquarters, it functioned with a secretariat within the City Hall. This is where the first registrations for the candidates and their verification took place. In the first year, the Polytechnic School started its activity with a number of 117 students from all Romanian provinces: 89 enrolled in the first year and 28 in the preparatory year. Courses began on 29 November 1920. The teaching staff consisted of rector Traian Lalescu (who taught mathematical analysis), Constantin Teodorescu (strength of materials and theoretical mechanics), Victor Vlad (descriptive geometry), Constantin Cândea (chemistry) and Augustin Coman (mathematics). Traian Lalescu's name is related to the establishment of the prestigious publication Revista matematică din Timișoara (15 March 1921), the Yearbook of the Polytechnic School, the Student Circle and the Student Sports Association ("Politehnica"). The courses were held in the premises of a primary school on Carol Telbisz Street, a place still in the patrimony of the Polytechnic. In 1923, the construction of pavilions began on Michael the Brave Boulevard, which groups the laboratories, museums and other rooms of the Polytechnic. King Ferdinand also took part in the inauguration of the pavilions on 11 November 1923, stating:

The rich Banat was deliberately chosen, for this school so necessary for our growing industrial development, to be not only a serious factor in the preparation of future generations of true pioneers, but also a nest of Romanian thought and feeling and a clot between the Old Kingdom and the provinces that through our bravery have been brought to our old country for centuries. It is not the walls that make a school, but the spirit that reigns in it.

=== 1948–1991: Polytechnic Institute ===
In 1948, the Polytechnic School changed its name to the Polytechnic Institute and comprised four faculties (Mechanics, Electrotechnics, Constructions and Chemistry) with 12 specialization sections.

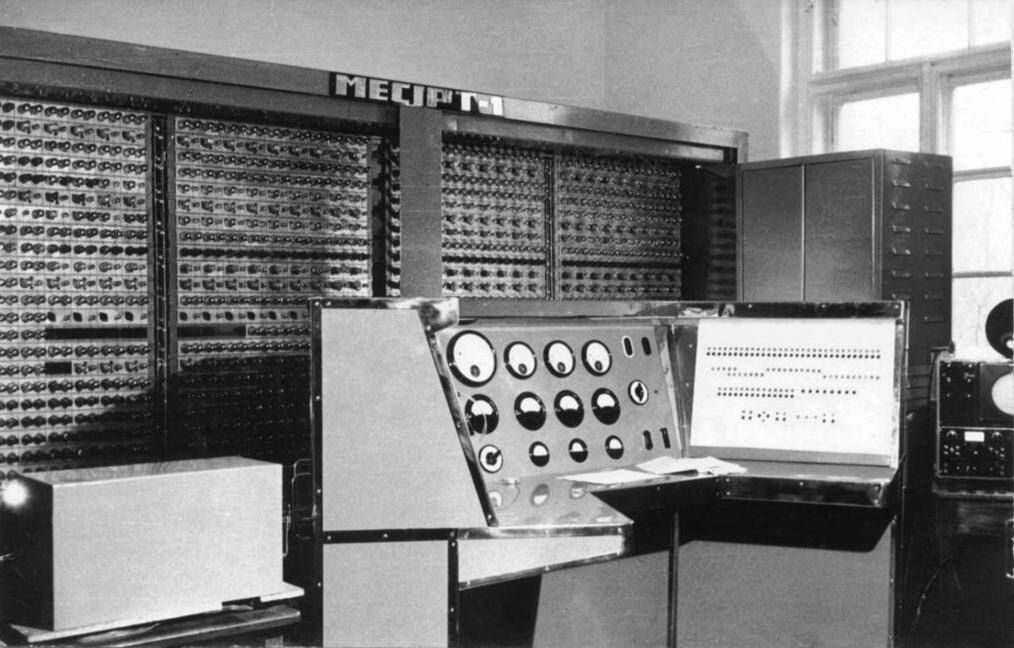
MECIPT-1 in the laboratory of the Faculty of Electrotechnics, 1961

The Computer Center was established in 1961. This was the core of the future IT industry in the area. Also here was built MECIPT-1, the first electronic computer built in a university in Romania and the second in the country after CIFA-1 from the Institute of Atomic Physics in Măgurele. The computer was used both in the teaching process and for the calculations needed for projects such as the Vidraru Dam and the RomExpo. The creators of MECIPT-1, Wilhelm Löwenfeld and Iosif Kaufmann, were decorated by the country's president in 2003 with the highest civil order – the Star of Romania in the rank of Knight – for their contribution to the development of computer technology in Romania. At the initiative of Horia Gligor and Dan Bedros, the MECIPT-1 computer was exhibited in a section of the Museum of Banat, in 2001, and along the way it was restored. Currently, MECIPT-1 has returned to the Politehnica University, being the central piece of the UPT Museum, along with other exhibits that highlight the pioneering role of Timișoara's Polytechnic in the development of computer technology in Romania.

The half-centenary of the institute was celebrated in 1970, on which occasion it was granted the right to bear the name of Traian Vuia Polytechnic Institute. The institute comprised five faculties with 24 specialization departments for engineers and sub-engineers, 537 teachers and 5,653 students. In 1974, according to the State Council Decree no. 147, the sub-engineering institutes from Hunedoara and Reșița became subordinated to the Traian Vuia Polytechnic Institute.

=== 1991–present: Politehnica University ===
In 1991, based on the Order of the Minister of Education and Science no. 4894, the Traian Vuia Polytechnic Institute was renamed the Technical University of Timișoara. Four years later, by Government Decision no. 568, it became the Polytechnic University of Timișoara.

== Faculties ==
Faculty	Location	Dean	Established	Students (2020/2021)
Architecture and Urbanism arh.upt.ro	2A Traian Lalescu Street, Timișoara	Ioan Andreescu	2005	753
Automation and Computers ac.upt.ro	2 Vasile Pârvan Boulevard, Timișoara	Marius Marcu	1990	3,266
Communication Sciences sc.upt.ro	2A Traian Lalescu Street, Timișoara	Daniel Dejica-Carțiș	2011	568
Constructions ct.upt.ro	2 Traian Lalescu Street, Timișoara	Raul Zaharia	1941	1,413
Electronics, Telecommunications and Information Technology etc.upt.ro	2 Vasile Pârvan Boulevard, Timișoara	Dan Lascu	1990	1,722
Electrotechnics and Electroenergetics et.upt.ro	2 Vasile Pârvan Boulevard, Timișoara	Ciprian Șorândaru	1948	792
Engineering fih.upt.ro	5 Revolution Street, Hunedoara	Ovidiu Tirian	1970	766
Industrial Chemistry and Environmental Engineering chim.upt.ro	6 Vasile Pârvan Boulevard, Timișoara	Mihai Medeleanu	1948	470
Mechanics mec.upt.ro	1 Michael the Brave Boulevard, Timișoara	Virgil Stoica	1948	2,413
Production and Transport Management mpt.upt.ro	14 Remus Street, Timișoara	Marian Mocan	1996	918

== Infrastructure ==
=== Dormitories ===
Politehnica University manages a number of 16 student dormitories, of which 14 are located in the Student Complex (Romanian: Complexul Studențesc) and two are located in the perimeter of the Faculty of Mechanics. As of 2017, the accommodation capacity of the dormitories is about 6,000 places.

=== Hotels ===
The university has two hotels in the city center, the Polytechnic House 1 (17 rooms) and the Polytechnic House 2 (31 rooms), both equipped at a three-star level and with their own restaurant.

=== Canteens ===
On the student campus, the university has two canteens: the student canteen and the 1MV fast food. Cafés also exist in many of the university buildings.

=== Central Library ===
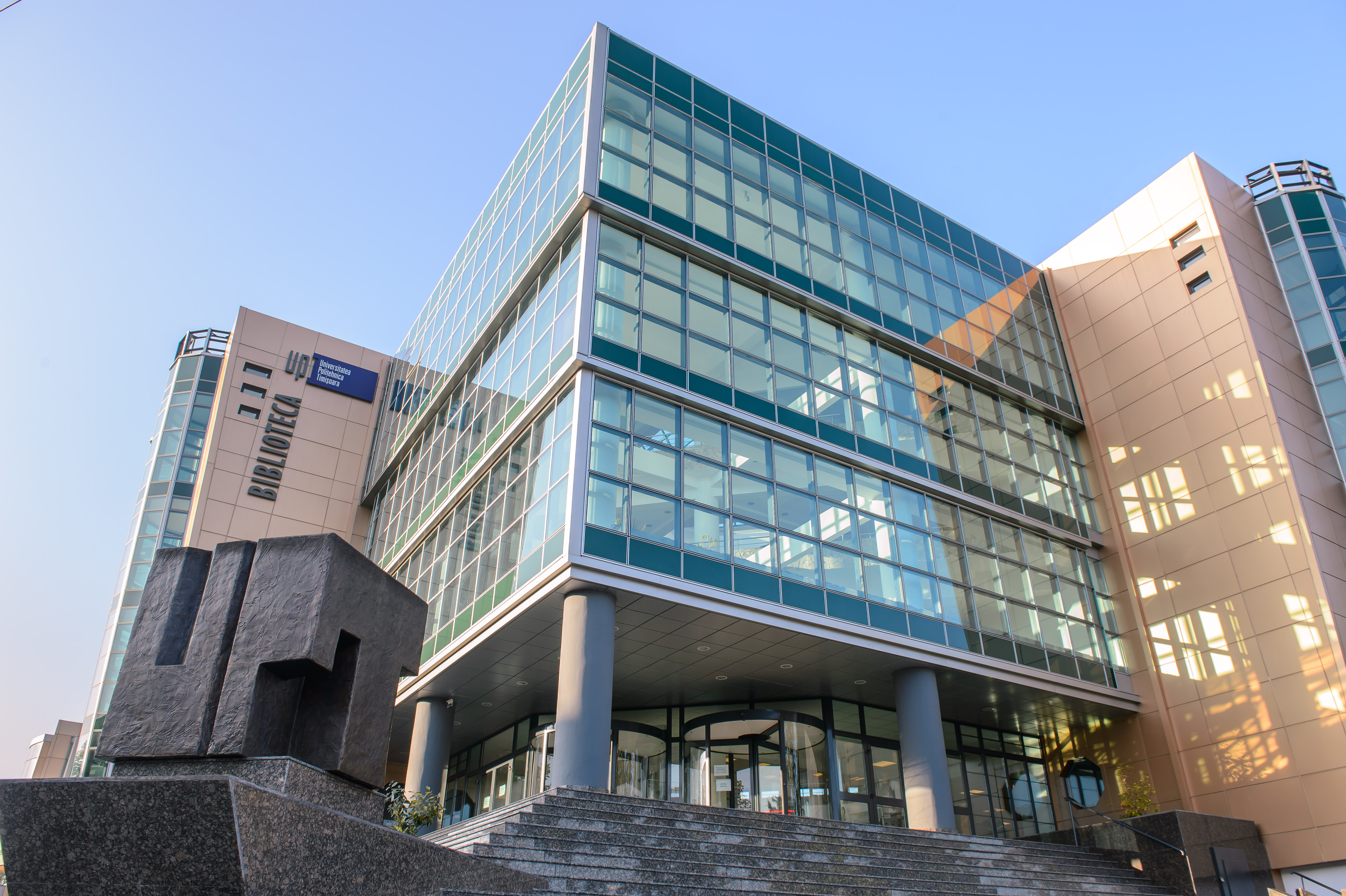
Central Library

The library was also founded in 1920, together with the Polytechnic School. The activity of the library was started in the building of the primary school on Carol Telbisz Street, where it was active until 1947, when its collections were moved to the headquarters on Piatra Craiului Street. Since November 2014, the library has a new headquarters at 2B Vasile Pârvan Boulevard. With about one million volumes in its inventory, the library has a daily traffic of over 1,000 users (exceeding even 2,000 users per day during exam sessions).

=== Sports facilities ===
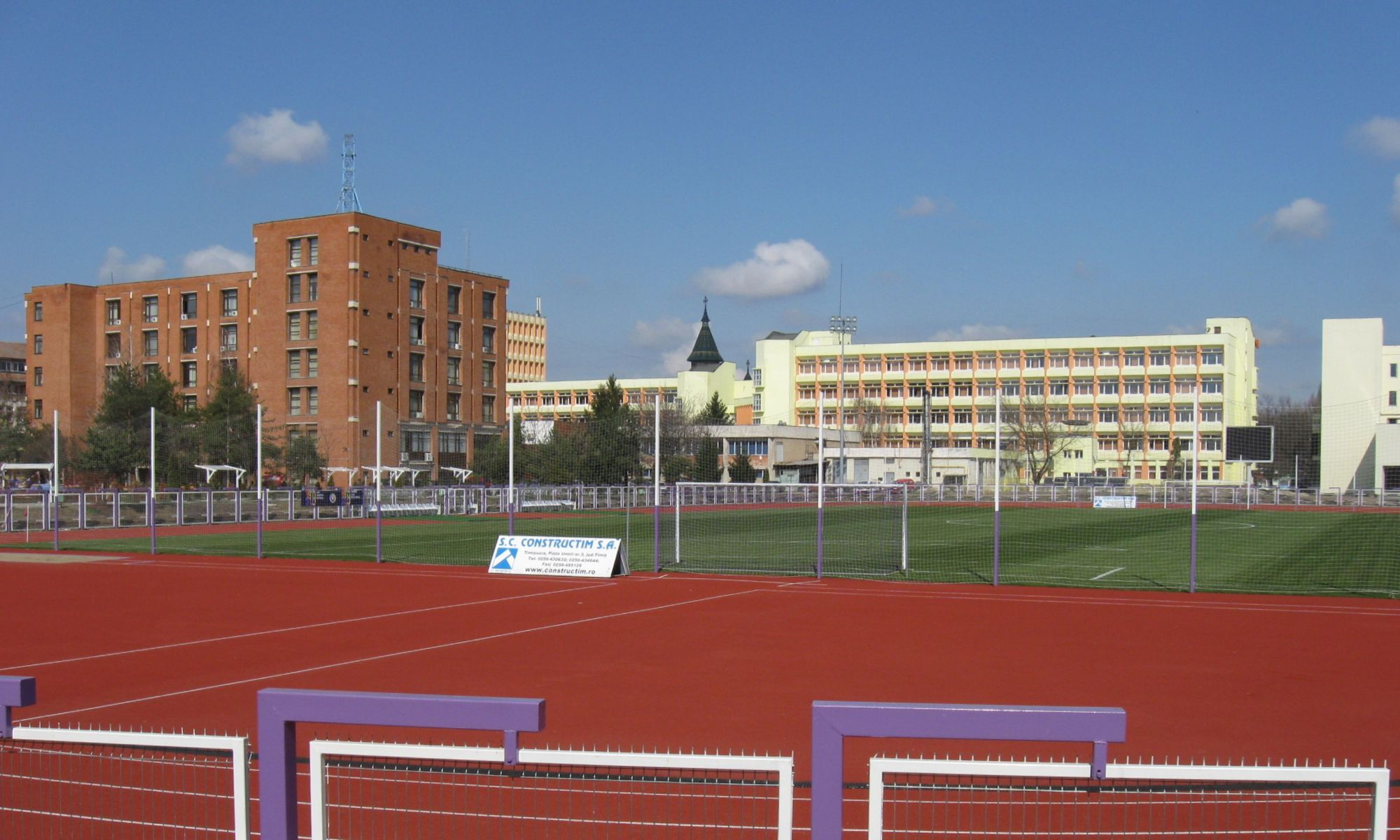
Sports base 1

Politehnica University has many sports facilities, including two sports bases with two indoor halls equipped for ball games, two standard football pitches for competitions, a football dome with synthetic grass, six tennis courts with floodlight, two handball courts, a complex of swimming pools, fitness rooms and facilities for many other sports games. Sports base 1 comprises an athletics track, indoor mini-football pitches, a football pitch and a gym, while sports base 2 has swimming pools, a sports hall, tennis courts, basketball courts and football pitches, among others.

Construction on a new 2,560-seat polyvalent hall began in 2010. The new arena will be used for basketball, volleyball, handball, tennis and other sports, but will also become a venue for various events and concerts.

== Mobility and international cooperation ==
The most part of the outgoing and incoming mobility is developed within the frame of the Erasmus Programme, currently Erasmus+. Besides Erasmus+, other mobility programmes are running or are expected to be implemented in UPT, based on bilateral agreements with foreign universities or on various mobility programmes and financial mechanisms, like EEA, CEEPUS, AUF and DAAD mobility schemes.

The university has more than 300 Erasmus+ agreements and over 100 framework cooperation agreements with universities in Europe, Asia, Africa, North America and South America. Every year more than 200 students carry out a study or internship mobility abroad, while more than 100 students from partner universities come to study or practice under the coordination of UPT teachers.

Internationally, the university is affiliated with:

- Association for Computing Machinery (ACM)
- Association for Smart Learning Ecosystem and Regional Development (ASLERD)
- Agence universitaire de la Francophonie (AUF)
- European Association for Architectural Education (EAAE)
- European Association for International Education (EAIE)
- European Distance and E-learning Network (EDEN)
- European University Association (EUA)
- Fédération internationale du béton (FIB)
- Institute of Electrical and Electronics Engineers (IEEE)

== Rectors ==
Name	Term
Polytechnic School
Traian Lalescu	1920–1921
Stan Vidrighin	1921
Victor Vâlcovici	1921–1930
Victor Blasian	1930–1933
Constantin Teodorescu	1934–1939
Corneliu Severineanu	1939–1940
Ilie Popescu	1940
Victor Lațiu	1940–1941
Plautius Andronescu	1941–1944
Marin Bănărescu	1944–1946
Constantin Cândea	1946–1947
Polytechnic Institute
Ilie Murgulescu	1947–1949
Nicolae Maior	1949–1950
Ioan Beligăr	1950–1956
Coriolan Drăgulescu	1956
Alexandru Rogojan	1956–1957
Marin Rădoi	1957–1962
Gheorghe Silaș	1962
Constantin Avram	1963–1971
Ioan Anton	1971–1981; 1989
Coleta de Sabata	1981–1989
Politehnica University
Radu Vladea	1990–1992
Alexandru Nichici	1992–1996
Ioan Carțiș	1996–2004
Nicolae Robu	2004–2012
Viorel Șerban	2012–2020
Florin Drăgan	2020–present

== Notable faculty ==
- Plautius Andronescu (1893–1975), engineer
- Constantin Avram (1911–1987), engineer
- Aurel Bărglăzan (1905–1960), engineer
- Constantin Dinculescu (1898–1990), engineer
- Coriolan Drăgulescu (1907–1977), chemist
- Caius Iacob (1912–1992), mathematician
- Traian Lalescu (1882–1929), mathematician
- Corneliu Miklósi (1887–1963), engineer
- Ilie Murgulescu (1902–1991), chemist
- Ștefan Nădășan (1901–1967), engineer
- Remus Răduleț (1904–1984), engineer
- Victor Vâlcovici (1885–1970), mathematician
- Victor Vlad (1889–1967), architect and engineer
- Ioan Vlădea (1907–1976), engineer

== See also ==
- List of modern universities in Europe (1801–1945)
