= Traian Lalescu =

Romanian mathematician (1882–1929)

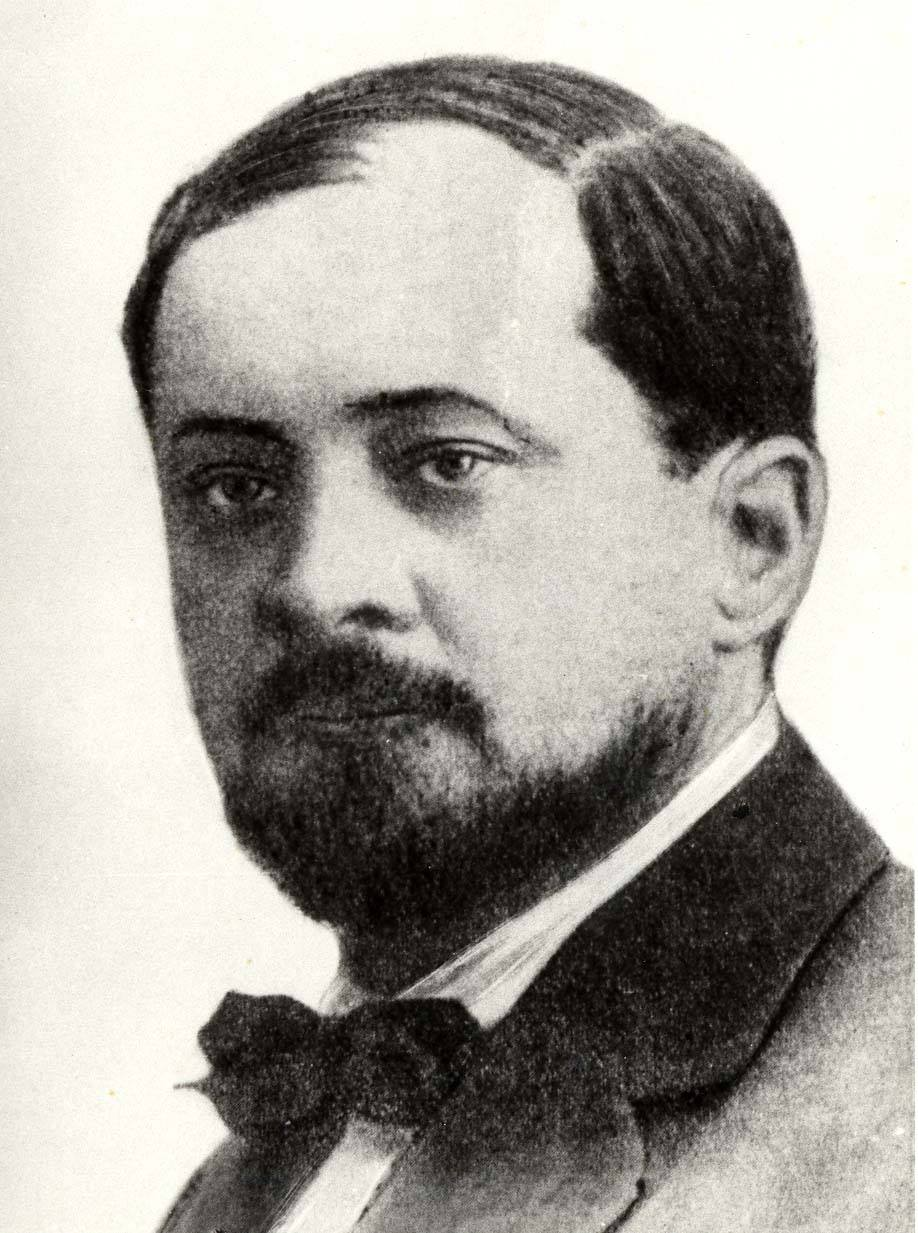
- Traian Lalescu in 1920
- Born: 12 July 1882; Bucharest, Kingdom of Romania
- Died: 15 June 1929 (aged 46); Bucharest, Kingdom of Romania
- Education: University of Bucharest; University of Paris
- Known for: Integral equations
- Spouse: Ecaterina Lalescu
- Children: 4
- Father: Traian Lalescu
- Scientific career
- Fields: Mathematics
- Workplaces: Politehnica University of Bucharest; University of Bucharest; Politehnica University of Timișoara
- Thesis: Sur les équations de Volterra (1908)
- Doctoral advisor: Émile Picard
- Doctoral students: Valeriu Alaci

Traian Lalescu (Romanian: [traˈjan laˈlesku]; 12 July 1882 – 15 June 1929) was a Romanian mathematician. His main focus was on integral equations and he contributed to work in the areas of functional equations, trigonometric series, mathematical physics, geometry, mechanics, algebra, and the history of mathematics.

== Life ==
He was born in Bucharest. His father, also named Traian, was originally from Cornea, Caraș-Severin and worked as a superintendent at the Creditul Agricol Bank. Lalescu went to the Carol I High School in Craiova, continuing high school in Roman, and graduating from the Boarding High School in Iași. After entering the University of Iași, he completed his undergraduate studies in 1903 at the University of Bucharest.

He earned his Ph.D. in Mathematics from the University of Paris in 1908. His dissertation, Sur les équations de Volterra, was written under the direction of Émile Picard. That same year, he presented his work at the International Congress of Mathematicians in Rome. In 1911, he published Introduction to the Theory of Integral Equations, the first book ever on the subject of integral equations.

After returning to Romania in 1909, he first taught Mathematics at the Ion Maiorescu Gymnasium in Giurgiu. He then taught until 1912 at the Gheorghe Șincai High School and the Cantemir Vodă High School in Bucharest. From 1909 to 1910, he was a teaching assistant at the School of Bridges and Roads, in the department of graphic statistics. A year later, he was appointed full-time professor of analytical geometry, succeeding Spiru Haret; he lectured at the School (which would later become the Polytechnic University of Bucharest) until his death. In 1916, he became the first president of Sportul Studențesc, the university's football club. Also that year, he was appointed tenured professor of algebra and number theory at the University of Bucharest, a position he held until his death. One of his PhD students there was Valeriu Alaci. In 1920, Lalescu became a professor and the inaugural rector of the Polytechnic University of Timișoara; for a year, he would commute by train for 20 hours between Timișoara and Bucharest to teach his classes. In 1921, he founded the football club Politehnica Timișoara.

His wife, Ecaterina, was a former student of his; they had four children—two sons and two daughters: Nicolae, Mariana, Florica, and Traian. She died in childbirth in 1921, at age 28. In 1920, Lalescu was elected to the Parliament of Romania as deputy for Orșova, and then re-elected twice as deputy for Caransebeș. He presented in parliament a well-received report on the budget project for 1925. In the fall of 1927, he caught a double pneumonia; in 1928, he went for a vacation in Nice and for treatment in Paris, but he succumbed to the disease the next year, at age 46. In 1991, he was elected posthumously honorary member of the Romanian Academy.

== The Lalescu sequence ==
In a 1900 issue of Gazeta Matematică, Lalescu proposed the study of the sequence

$$L_{n} = \sqrt[n+1]{(n+1)!}-\sqrt[n]{n!}$$.

It turns out that the Lalescu sequence is decreasing and bounded below by 0, and thus is converging. Its limit is given by

$$\lim_{n\to\infty} L_{n} = \frac{1}{e}$$.

== Legacy ==
There are several institutions bearing his name, including Colegiul Național de Informatică Traian Lalescu in Hunedoara and Liceul Teoretic Traian Lalescu in Reșița. There are also streets named after him in Craiova, Oradea, Reșița, and Timișoara. The National Mathematics Contest Traian Lalescu for undergraduate students is also named after him.

A statue of Lalescu, carved in 1930 by Cornel Medrea, is situated in front of the Faculty of Mechanical Engineering, in Timișoara and another statue of Lalescu is situated inside the University of Bucharest.

== Work ==
- T. Lalesco, Introduction à la théorie des équations intégrales. Avec une préface de É. Picard, Paris: A. Hermann et Fils, 1912. VII + 152 pp. JFM entry
- Traian Lalescu, Introducere la teoria ecuațiilor integrale, Editura Academiei Republicii Populare Romîne, 1956. 134 pp. (A reprint of the first edition [Bucharest, 1911], with a bibliography taken from the French translation [Paris, 1912]). MR 0085450

Preceded by -	Rector of the Polytechnic University of Timișoara; 1920–1921	Succeeded by Victor Vâlcovici
