= Remus Răduleț =

Romanian electrical engineer

Remus Bazilius Răduleț (May 3, 1904 – February 6, 1984) was a Romanian electrical engineer, who contributed to the development of the International Electrotechnical Vocabulary and theoretical electrotechnology. He was a titular member of the Romanian Academy and served as president of the International Electrotechnical Commission from 1964 to 1967.

== Biography ==
He was born in 1904 in Brădeni (then in Austria-Hungary, now in Sibiu County, Romania), the son of the priest Vasile Răduleț and his wife, Ana Răduleț. He attended elementary school in Berivoi and Sighișoara, and then studied at Radu Negru High School in Făgăraș from 1919 to 1923. He studied electromechanical engineering at the Politehnica University of Timișoara, then at ETH Zurich. He coordinated the writing of the Romanian Technical Lexicon, a vast multilingual technical encyclopedia. This activity enabled him to contribute to the international standardized vocabulary of electrotechnology.

Răduleț was elected corresponding member of the Romanian Academy in 1955, and titular member in 1963. He died in Bucharest in 1984.

== Works ==
- Lexiconul tehnic român, 18 volumes, 1948
- Bazele Electrotehnicii, 1966
