= Viorel Oancea =

Romanian politician and major general (1944–2026)

Mayor of Timișoara
- In office 18 February 1992 – 2 June 1996

Personal details
- Born: 8 December 1944 Brașov, Brașov County, Romania
- Died: 13 July 2026 (aged 81)
- Party: Partidul Alianța Civică (PAC)

Viorel Oancea (8 December 1944 – 13 July 2026) was a Romanian politician and a major general in the Romanian Armed Forces. He was advanced in rank by Presidential decree issued by former President Traian Băsescu on 21 October 2010.

== Romanian Revolution of 1989 ==
Oancea was the first Army officer to take a stance against the Communist regime during the Romanian Revolution on 22 December 1989. This act led to his imprisonment under General Ștefan Gușă.

In 1992, he was awarded the PL Foundation Freedom Award, shared with Radu Filipescu for his fight against the Romanian regime led by Nicolae Ceaușescu and his human rights advocacy.

== Political career ==
Oancea was the first freely elected Mayor of Timișoara, an office he held from 1992 to 1996.

In 1997, he became General Secretary of Ministry of Interior, a position he held until 1998. He then returned to Timisoara, to take up the position of Local Councillor until 2004. Running for state office, in 2004 he was elected Deputy at the Chamber of Deputies, a role he held until 2008.

His last political appointment before retiring from public office was Romanian Secretary of State (2009–2012), representing Romania's defense interests on the NATO Council.

== Death ==
Oancea died on 13 July 2026, at the age of 81.
