= Ferdinand I National College =

High school in Bacău, Romania

Coordinates: 46.5695°N 26.9059°E

Ferdinand I National College (Romanian: Colegiul Național "Ferdinand I") is a high school in Bacău, Romania, located at 45 George Bacovia Street.

Established in 1867, the school's early years were marked by a lack of faculty, a permanent building and teaching material. The first graduating class finished in 1871, and the first dedicated building was finished in 1891. That year, the school was named the Prince Ferdinand Gymnasium. This was changed to Prince Ferdinand High School when a new grade was added in 1897. It was known as Ferdinand I High School from 1914, when its namesake acceded to the Romanian throne, until 1948, when the Communist regime changed the name. For two decades after that point, the school had no particular name. In 1967, for its centenary, it was named after George Bacovia, a former student. In 1997, the school acquired its present name.

Former faculty include Garabet Ibrăileanu, Dimitrie D. Pătrășcanu, Gheorghe Dima, Vasile Pârvan, and Grigore H. Grandea. Aside from Bacovia, former students include Solomon Marcus, Toma Caragiu, Radu Beligan, Constantin Arseni, Gheorghe Cartianu-Popescu, Eugen Uricaru, Vladimir Hanga, Diana Lupescu, Nicolae Șova, Gheorghe Platon, Constantin Avram, Constantin Cândea, and Iulius Iancu.

The old school building is listed as a historic monument by Romania's Ministry of Culture and Religious Affairs.
