= Hănțești =

- Commune
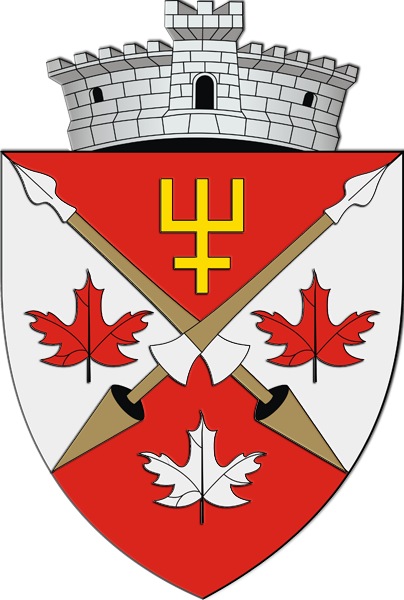
- Coat of arms

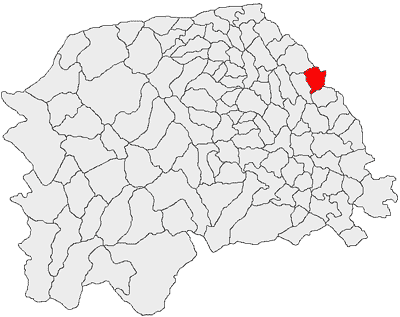
- Location in Suceava County

- Location in Romania
- Coordinates: 47°45′N 26°22′E
- Country: Romania
- County: Suceava
- Subdivisions: Hănțești, Arțari, Berești

Government
  - Mayor (2024–2028): Daniel Olariu (PSD)
- Area: 38 km^{2} (15 sq mi)
- Population (2021-12-01): 3,776
  - Density: 99/km^{2} (260/sq mi)
- Time zone: EET/EEST (UTC+2/+3)
- Postal code: 727011
- Area code: (+40) x30
- Vehicle reg.: SV
- Website: hantesti.ro

Hănțești is a commune located in Suceava County, Romania. It is composed of three villages: Arțari, Berești and Hănțești.
