= Adrian Cioroianu =

Romanian politician, academic and writer

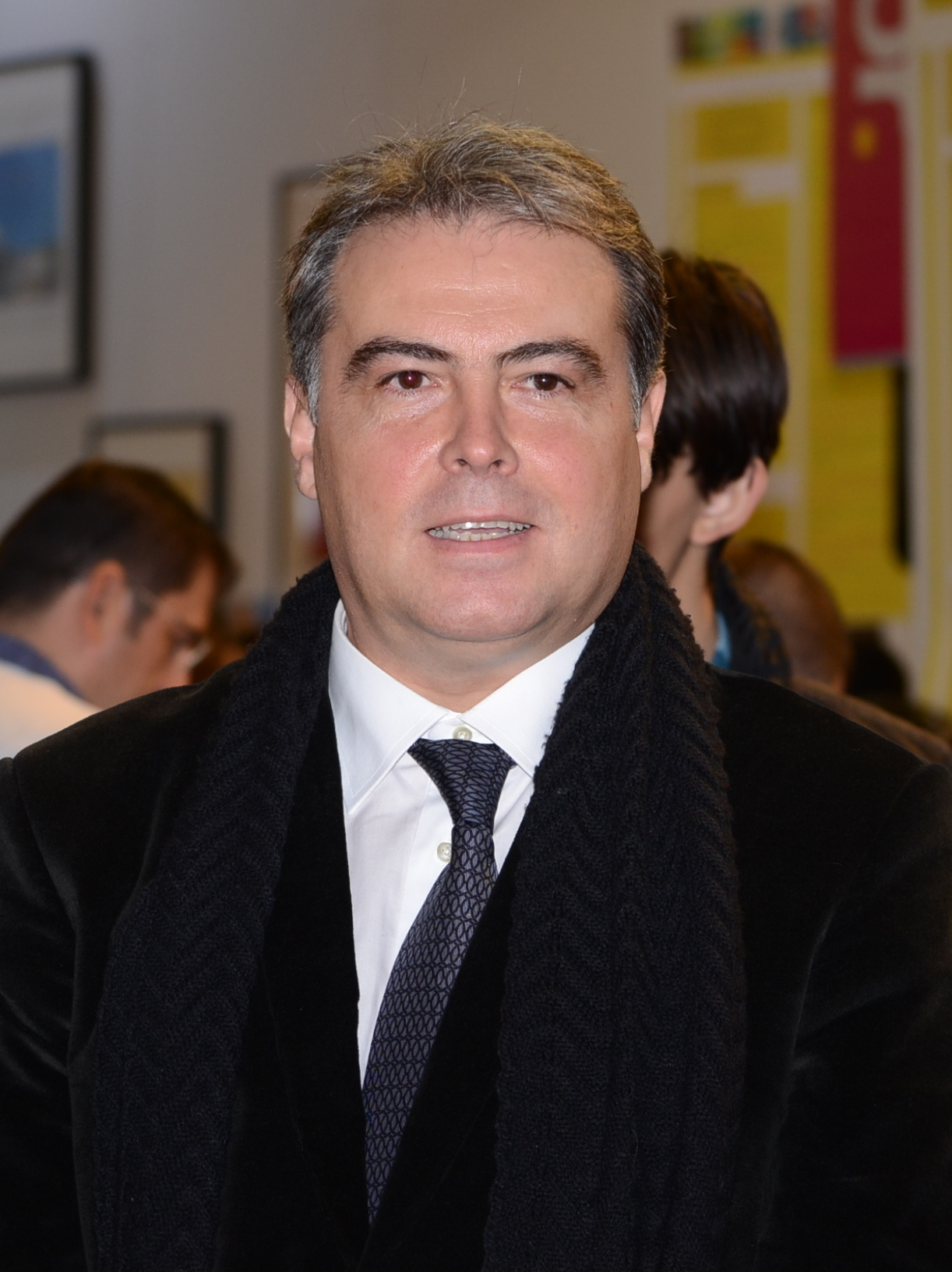
- Cioroianu in 2013

Minister of Foreign Affairs
- In office April 5, 2007 – April 15, 2008
- Preceded by: Călin Popescu-Tăriceanu
- Succeeded by: Lazăr Comănescu
- Constituency: Timiș County

Personal details
- Born: January 5, 1967 (age 59) Craiova, Dolj County
- Party: National Liberal Party (PNL)
- Spouse: Divorced
- Occupation: Historian, academic, journalist
- Website: www.cioroianu.ro

Adrian Mihai Cioroianu (born January 5, 1967, in Craiova, Romania) is a Romanian historian, politician, journalist, and essayist. A lecturer for the History Department at the University of Bucharest, he is the author of several books dealing with Romanian history (and specifically with the history of Communist Romania). He is also noted for his contribution as co-author of a high school textbook.

A member of the Group for Social Dialogue, he joined the National Liberal Party (PNL) and was elected to the Romanian Senate for Timiș County in 2004. Following the accession of Romania to the European Union (January 1, 2007), he served as a Member of the European Parliament in the Alliance of Liberals and Democrats for Europe (ALDE) and a vice president of the ALDE group in the European Parliament. On April 5, 2007, Cioroianu became Foreign Affairs Minister in the second Călin Popescu-Tăriceanu cabinet. On April 11, 2008, he announced his resignation, following a scandal involving the death of a Romanian citizen on hunger strike in Poland.

A contributor to numerous newspapers and magazines (including Cotidianul, 22, Sfera Politicii, Lettre International, and Dosarele Istoriei), he has been a member of the editorial staff for Dilema Veche since 1998, and an editor for Gazeta Sporturilor since 2003. Between 2000 and 2004, Cioroianu has hosted several talk shows on television (for Pax TV, TVR 1, and Realitatea TV).

== Biography ==
=== Early life ===
He was born on 5 January 1967. Born in Craiova to Iulian and Valeria, Cioroianu graduated from the University of Bucharest's Faculty of History in 1993, taking a Master's degree from Université Laval in Quebec (1997), and a PhD from the same institution (with the thesis The Myth, the Images and the Cult of the Leader in Communist Romania, 2002).

In 1993 he married Luminiţa, a university classmate who became an English-language translator. They had a son, Mihai, in 1999 before divorcing in November 2003. His wife cited an extramarital affair and a disinterest in family obligations as motives for the divorce.

=== Textbook controversy ===
One of his first noted public appearances took place in 1999, when several textbooks received endorsement from the Ministry of Education, as multiple alternatives to the older ones (which had been authored by the ministry itself). New methods and subjects proposed in the study of Romanian history became the center of controversy, which involved, among others, the textbook authored by Cioroianu and other University staff (Stelian Brezeanu, Florin Müller, Mihai Sorin Rădulescu, and Mihai Retegan) for Editura RAO; the book itself was criticized for not allocating a larger segment to the Romanian Revolution of 1989, and Cioroianu later explained that the editorial choice had been imposed by the level of trustworthy sources available at the time.

Cioroianu was also highly critical of the methods used by adversaries of the textbooks during the overall debate, and publicly sided with the authors of arguably the most innovative manual, the one published by Editura Sigma. He repeatedly argued in favor of the authors (Sorin Mitu, Ovidiu Pecican, Lucia Copoeru, Virgiliu Ţârău, and Liviu Ţîrău), debating the issue with Marius Tucă and Octavian Paler during television appearances of that year.

Throughout the Adrian Năstase premiership (2000–2004), Cioroianu remained critical of the Social Democratic Party's policies on education, and questioned the decision taken by the Minister of Education, Ecaterina Andronescu, regarding restrictions on the number of textbooks receiving official approval.

=== Political career ===
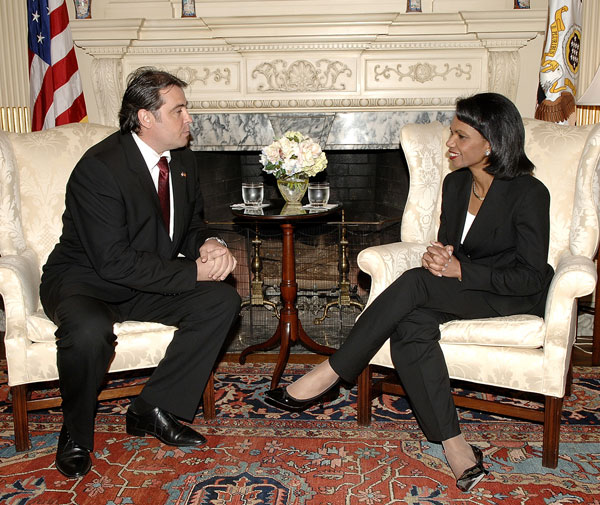
Adrian Cioroianu meets Condoleezza Rice in Washington, DC, June 13, 2007

Cioroianu entered politics as a PNL member in 2002, when he became an adviser on Theodor Stolojan's staff.

In 2004, he was elected to the Senate for Timiș County, a member of the Justice and Truth group inside the Parliament of Romania. He was Vice President of the Senate Committee on Culture, Arts and Media, and stood on the Committee of Inquiry into the activities of the Romanian Television Company.

With fellow National Liberal parliamentarians Mona Muscă, Viorel Oancea, and Mihăiţă Calimente, Cioroianu initiated the legislative project on lustration (aimed at preventing former Romanian Communist Party and Union of Communist Youth active cadres from holding public office over a period of ten years). Proposed at the same time as a more radical one drafted by National Initiative Party politicians, it reflected the legacy of the Timișoara Proclamation and was passed by the Senate in April 2006.

He became an observer to the European Parliament in 2005, and was subsequently selected MEP in 2007. On February 19, 2007, he was nominated as foreign minister by Prime Minister Călin Popescu Tăriceanu, following the resignation of Mihai Răzvan Ungureanu. President Traian Băsescu refused to approve the nomination, saying that Cioroianu lacked the necessary experience. In March, Tăriceanu asked the Constitutional Court to resolve the dispute.

Following the creation of the second Popescu Tăriceanu cabinet, Cioroianu was confirmed as foreign minister by President Băsescu and sworn in on April 5, 2007. He resigned on April 11, 2008, following a scandal involving an alleged Romanian thief who died following a hunger strike in Kraków, Poland, where he had been arrested. Romania's consular services were faulted for not intervening in his defense.

=== "Greatest Romanians" controversy ===
In autumn 2006, he was selected by TVR 1 to take part in the televised poll to determine the greatest Romanian, during which he was to showcase the career of Conducător Ion Antonescu, Romania's World War II dictator; the public had already selected Antonescu as one of the top 10 entries. Like other intellectuals chosen to take part in the campaign, each supporting a particular entry, Cioroianu narrated a short documentary film, and was subsequently involved in debates on the TVR 1 set (during two separate rounds of voting).

Unlike all other participants, he chose to base his account of Antonescu on criticism, exposing, among others, war crimes against the Jewish and Roma communities during the Holocaust (in Transnistria and elsewhere), as well as Antonescu's unquestioned support for Adolf Hitler (see Romania during World War II), while arguing that Antonescu was a mediocre politician.

The Romanian Academy's National Institute for the Study of Totalitarianism reacted to the program, accusing TVR 1 of mounting an overt campaign to denigrate Antonescu. It also questioned the fact that Cioroianu, a member of the Senate Committee on Culture, had accepted payment with public funds for his presence on the show. Criticism was also voiced by Ziua newspaper, which asked why the Television had not handed the office to a public person with more positive views of the former Romanian leader, and argued that Cioroianu had used his position to shame those who had voted for Antonescu.

In response, Cioroianu indicated that he had been invited on set as a history professor, not as an Antonescu defender or a senator, and argued that his was a version determined by research (arguing that the latter is "the best cure against all sorts of mythologies and clichés").

== Works ==
=== Authored ===
- Scrum de secol. O sută una poveşti suprapuse ("The Ashes of a Century. A Hundred and One Superimposed Stories"), Editura Curtea Veche, Bucharest, 2001
- Focul ascuns în piatră. Despre istorie, memorie şi alte vanităţi contemporane ("The Fire Hidden in Stone. On History, Memory and Other Contemporary Vanities"), Polirom, Iaşi, 2002
- Ce Ceausescu qui hante les Roumains: le mythe, les représentations et le culte du Dirigeant dans la Roumanie communiste ("This Ceauşescu Who Is Haunting the Romanians: the Myth, the Images and the Cult of the Leader in Communist Romania"; originally published in French), Editura Curtea Veche, L'agence Universitaire de la Francophonie, Bucharest 2005
- Pe umerii lui Marx. O introducere în istoria comunismului românesc ("On the Shoulders of Marx. An Incursion into the History of Romanian Communism"), Editura Curtea Veche, Bucharest, 2005. ISBN 973-669-175-6
- Sic transit gloria. Cronica subiectivă a unui cincinal în trei ani şi jumătate ("Sic Transit Gloria. The Subjective Chronicle of a Five-Year Plan Completed over Three and a Half Years"), Polirom, Iaşi, 2006

=== Co-authored ===
- With Lucian Boia and Tom Sandqvist: Arhiva Durerii ("The Archive of Pain"), Editura Fundaţia Academia Civică, Pionier Press 2000
