= June 1990 Mineriad =

Riot of protesters and miners in Bucharest

- Part of the mineriads and the Golaniad
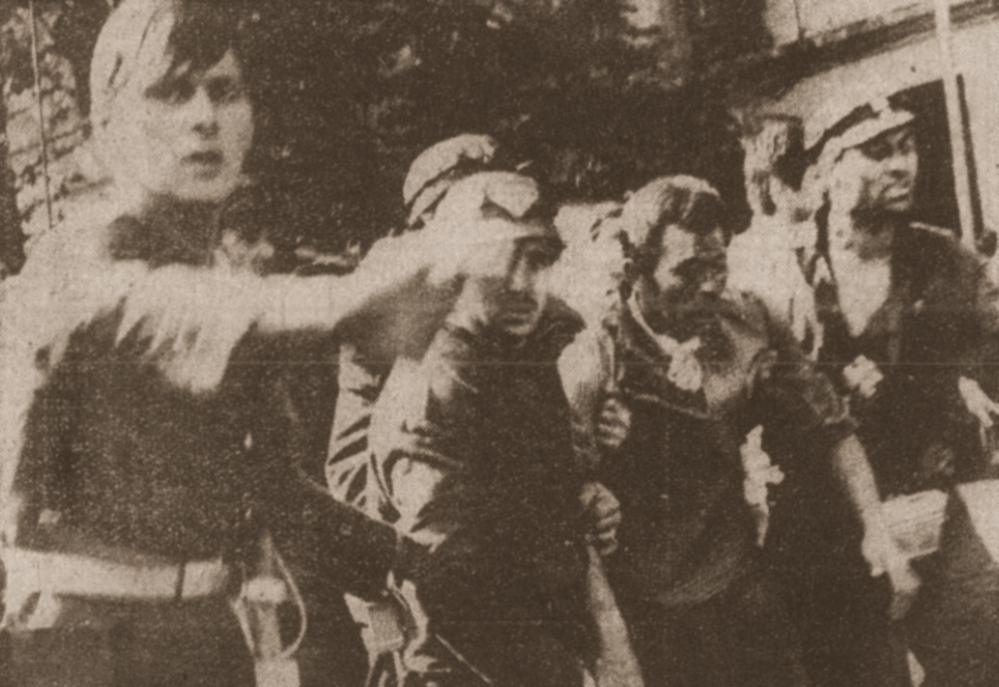
- Miners escorting a captive whom they viewed as engaged in acts of terrorism (14 June photograph by Marius Stoian)
- Date: 13–15 June 1990
- Location: Bucharest, Romania
- Methods: Demonstration; Revolt; Civil disobedience; Vandalism

Parties
Anti-government protesters	Government of Romania: National Salvation Front; Jiu Valley miners; Romanian Police

Lead figures
Marian Munteanu	Miron Cozma; Ion Iliescu

Casualties
- Deaths: 6 (official) over 100 (claims by opposition press)
- Injuries: 746–1,000

The June 1990 Mineriad was the suppression of anti-National Salvation Front (FSN) rioting in Bucharest, Romania by the physical intervention of groups of industrial workers as well as coal miners from the Jiu Valley, brought to Bucharest by the government to counter the rising violence of the protesters. This event occurred several weeks after the FSN achieved a landslide victory in the May 1990 general election, the first elections after the fall of the communist regime of Nicolae Ceaușescu. Many of the miners, factory workers, and other anti-protester groups, fought with the protesters and bystanders. The violence resulted in some deaths and many injuries on both sides of the confrontations. Official figures listed seven fatalities and hundreds of injured, although media estimates of the number killed and injured varied widely and were often much higher.

== Background ==
The initial enthusiasm after the Romanian Revolution of 1989 was tempered in January 1990, after the National Salvation Front (Frontul Salvării Naționale, FSN), an organization that emerged as the leader during the anti-Ceaușescu revolution, decided to run as a party in the elections it was set to organize. Further discontent was brought by the fact that many of the FSN leaders, including its president, Ion Iliescu, were former members of the Romanian Communist Party. When the 1989 Revolution occurred, the Communist Party had a membership of 4 million out of a population of 22 million.

The newly founded parties that opposed the FSN organised, beginning with April, large electoral meetings in University Square. Students and professors at the University of Bucharest also joined in the protests. One of their most vocal demands was the voting into law of the eighth demand of the Proclamation of Timișoara, which stated that communists should be prevented from holding official functions.

Iliescu dubbed the protesters as golani (rascals) or huligani (hooligans), and implied fascists groups participated in the protest in an attempt to seize power. The protesters eventually adopted the name golani and the movement came to be known as the Golaniad.

After Iliescu and the FSN won a landslide victory in the elections of May 20, 1990, the opposition parties decided to disband the meeting. Only a small part of the protesters remained in the square, where they set up tents. After several weeks, the government decided to forcefully evacuate the remaining protesters, but the police attempts were met with violence, and several state institutions, including the police headquarters, the national television station, and the Foreign Ministry, were attacked. President Iliescu issued a call to Romania's population to come to Bucharest in order to save the "besieged democratic regime" and restore order and democracy in Bucharest. The most important group to answer the call were the powerful miner's organizations from the Jiu Valley. Some 10,000 miners were transported to Bucharest in special trains.

== Prelude ==
On 22 April, the Christian-Democratic National Peasants' Party (Partidul Național Țărănesc Creștin și Democrat, PNȚCD) and other parties organised a demonstration in Aviators' Square. After the peaceful demonstration, groups of people marched towards the Romanian Television (TVR) station, calling for its political independence. They continued their protest in University Square and decided to sit in overnight. Two days later, they were still there, their numbers growing. They stated that they would not leave the Square, dubbing their protest "the big anti-communism protest".

Their main demands were the adoption of point 8 of the Proclamation of Timișoara (no former members of the disbanded Romanian Communist Party in the new government), the political independence of TVR, and inquiries about the truth of the Revolution. The Geology Faculty's balcony became the stage for almost a month of protest. The opposition decided to abandon protests after FSN's victory in the May elections.

On 11 June, negotiations between the government and the remaining demonstrators failed. About 100 people, dissatisfied with the result of the dialogue between the government and the hunger strikers, started rioting in Victory Square (Piața Victoriei) and closed in on Victoria Palace (Palatul Victoria, the government's headquarters).

Police, military police and army forces appeared, together with some armoured personnel carriers. The police pushed the demonstrators back to Calea Victoriei and retreated towards the Palace.

== 13 June ==
04:00: The police forces attacked the hunger strikers. Tents were ripped up and destroyed, and personal objects were confiscated. Strikers were arrested, but some escaped and took refuge in the hall of the InterContinental Hotel.

05:00: Police attacked the Architecture Institute (Institutul de Arhitectură), surrounded the Square and built barricades out of vehicles. The representatives of the Police Press Bureau declared that they didn't know what was happening in the city centre.

9:30: Demonstrators appeared around the barricade built between Colțea Hospital and "Luceafărul" Cinema and started chanting anti-government protests. Many arrests took place.

11:00: The number of arrests was made public by radio: about 240. At the Architecture Faculty (Facultatea de Arhitectură) there was a press conference of students and hunger strikers who were attacked but had managed to evade arrest.

12:00: The Architecture Institute was assaulted by a group of workers from the Bucharest's industrial platforms, shouting: "I.M.G.B. makes the law!". Another group, mostly of women, shouted: "I.C.T.B. makes the law!", brandishing makeshift weapons. The students barricaded themselves, but the building was assaulted. The police showed up. Other groups shouted anti-governmental slogans and split apart the two groups of workers.

14:00: From the Academiei and Colței streets protesters launch Molotov cocktails. In the area in the vicinity of the University, Architecture Institute and the Negoiu Hotel, the crowd shouted and booed. The police appeared, but withdrew because people were throwing bottles and rocks from the rooftops.

17:30: The demonstrators smashed the police barrage and reach the balcony. More policemen appeared, but were forced to withdraw under the heavy "artillery barrage" of rocks and bottles. An explosion set fire to the police bus that blocked the entry to the square. The police left and the square was occupied. At the truck barricade on Onești street a bus was set on fire. At the balcony of the Geology College (Facultatea de Geologie), Marian Munteanu, head of the Student League from the University of Bucharest, announced that the students were on strike and would barricade themselves in the building until their arrested colleagues were released. Shortly thereafter, the main HQs of the Bucharest Police, Interior Minister and SRI were attacked. Protesters threw Molotov cocktails, started fires, conducted various acts of violence, destroyed documents and objects, and took people hostage. There were rumours that trains full of miners were heading for Bucharest.

Ion Iliescu addressed the public, urging them to oppose the violent acts and do everything they could to re-establish order.

18:00: Thousands of demonstrators gathered in the Television yard, although the zone was guarded by police and civilians. Protesters armed with clubs and other improvised weapons went to the entrance to Pangratti Street. Violence ensued and broadcasting was interrupted. In the Television building, the film archive was destroyed, along with IBM subtitle machines, montage rooms and mobile phones. Telephone wires were cut, documents were stolen or destroyed, windows were broken and people were violently attacked.

== 14 June ==
In the early morning, coal miners from the Jiu Valley reached Bucharest on trains, along with their leader Miron Cozma. They headed for Victory Square, where they were welcomed and bread was distributed to them from army vehicles.

A number of officials appeared at the Council of Ministers at Victory Square, and finally Iliescu showed up accompanied by representatives of the miners. In his speech he accused the demonstrators of the University Square of being alcoholics, drug addicts, fascists (making reference to the Iron Guard "Legionnaires" of the World War II era), and bandits. In the square were also groups carrying banners showing that they are from particular factories.

During this period, the Opposition newspapers and magazines România Liberă, Dreptatea, Express, 22, Baricada were attacked and damaged, and some of the newspaper workers were assaulted. The building where România Liberă was printed was damaged. România Liberă and several publications of opposition political groups were not published in the interval of 15–18 June, as the typography workers refused to print the anti-government articles. The student demonstrators and protesters were engaged in violent confrontation with workers and other pro-government groups. The University and Architecture Institute was devastated and many students badly beaten.

From 14–15 June arrests of the people involved in the demonstration of University Square continued.

== Casualties ==
The number of victims is controversial. Officially, according to the evidence from the parliamentary commissions of inquiry, the number of wounded is 746, and the death toll is six: four dead by shooting, one dead of a heart attack and a person stabbed. Viorel Ene, president of the Association of Victims of the Mineriads, asserted that "there are documents, testimonies of doctors, of people from Domnești and Străulești cemeteries. Although we have said all along that the real number of dead is over 100, no one contradicted so far and there was no official position against." The opposition newspaper România Liberă alleged that over 128 unidentified bodies were buried in a common grave in Străulești II cemetery, near Bucharest.

A few weeks after the mineriad, several medical students conducted research in Străulești II cemetery, discovering two trenches with about 78 unmarked graves, which they claimed to contain victims of the events. There were also other people – journalists, photographers, students – who have carried out research and photographs at the Institute of Forensic Medicine and Străulești Cemetery. In August–September 1990, under the signature of Eugen Dichiseanu, România Liberă published, in a series of 10 episodes, a survey on the subject. The research, conducted by journalist Eugen Dichiseanu and members of the League of Students, including George Roncea, claimed to have found major irregularities, inaccuracies, negligencies, deficiencies of organization, but also attempts of default of evidence in the functioning of institutions involved in managing the situation of dead without identity: Police, Prosecution, Institute of Forensic Medicine (IFM), Bucharest City Hall.

== Aftermath ==
According to the report of Gheorge Robu and Interior Minister Doru-Viorel Ursu, from the events of 13–15 June 185 people were arrested; 34 put on trial; 2 freed unconditionally; 17 freed under parole after medical examinations; 81 freed under parole; 51 remained under arrest.

The demonstrations in University Square persisted until about 24–25 August 1990.

== Press reaction ==
The pro-FSN press (such as Adevărul, Dimineaţa, Azi) praised the miners and other workers for being the "defenders of liberty and democracy" and criticized the negative coverage of the international press who, they claim, saw only one part of the issue.

The official government position on the foreign press opinion was expressed on 15 June 1990 by Prime Minister Petre Roman. He declared that the international press had a "strange" point of view and that the intervention against the opposition was not a "fascist program", but it was the other way around, the protesters being the fascists.

== Differing perspective of the miners ==
See also The 1990s: the rise and decline of miners' unions

The Jiu Valley miners were vilified in the national and international press for their role in the confrontation and the subsequent violence and destruction. Subsequent interviews with miners participating in the confrontation provide a very different perspective of the events that transpired. Many claim that individuals reportedly representing the government came to the mines and union groups and told the miners that the new democracy was under attack by anarchists and provocateurs who wanted to bring down the elected government. It was their duty, the miners were told, to protect Romania and the new democracy. Few, if any, of the miners had any connection with or knowledge of the protesters and their demands, so they followed the direction of individuals they believed represented the government. In the view of many individuals in Jiu Valley, most of the violence was perpetuated by non-miners or agents provocateurs dressed like miners. The perspective that the Bucharest-controlled media refused to provide their version of events was and continues to be widely held throughout the Jiu Valley.

== Inquiry into potential involvement of the Romanian Intelligence Service ==
Later inquiries would show that these claims by the miners were not unfounded. Rumors and public suspicion (and later Parliamentary inquiries) of the potential role of the Serviciul Român de Informaţii (Romanian Intelligence Service), the successor to the former Securitate), in the instigation and manipulation of the June 1990 Mineriad contributed to the widespread public mistrust of the post-Ceauşescu Romanian intelligence service.

Government inquiries would show that the miners had indeed been "joined by vigilantes who were later credibly identified as former officers of the Securitate", and that for two days, the miners had been aided and abetted by former Securitate members in their violent confrontation with the protesters and other targets. In February 1994 a Bucharest court "found two security officers, Colonel Ion. Nicolae and warrant officer Corneliu Dumitrescu, guilty of ransacking the house of Ion Rațiu, a leading figure in the National Peasant Christian Democratic Party, during the miners’ incursion, and stealing $100,000."

In addition to accusations of having agents infiltrate and incite the opposition rally on 18 February 1990 and later directly participate in the June 1990 anti-opposition violence involving the Jiu Valley miners, there were also claims that during this period secret services were involved in distributing fake Legionary leaflets that claimed a fascist take-over in Romania was about to occur, and evidence that intelligence officials selectively released documents from Securitate archives in order to compromise opposition leaders.

According to a research report put out by the Conflict Studies Research Centre at Britain's Royal Military Academy Sandhurst:

Despite repeated denials by its leaders, there are clear indications of the SRI's involvement. Recently, Voican Voiculescu even accused Măgureanu of having staged the violence in order to take over as prime minister. Other sources claim that the miners' arrival in Bucharest was orchestrated by Major Dumitru Iliescu (now a colonel), the chief of President Iliescu's Special Guard and Protocol Unit (renamed the Protection and Protocol Service in July 1991).
