= Cristian Pațurcă =

Romanian composer, anti-communist and revolutionary

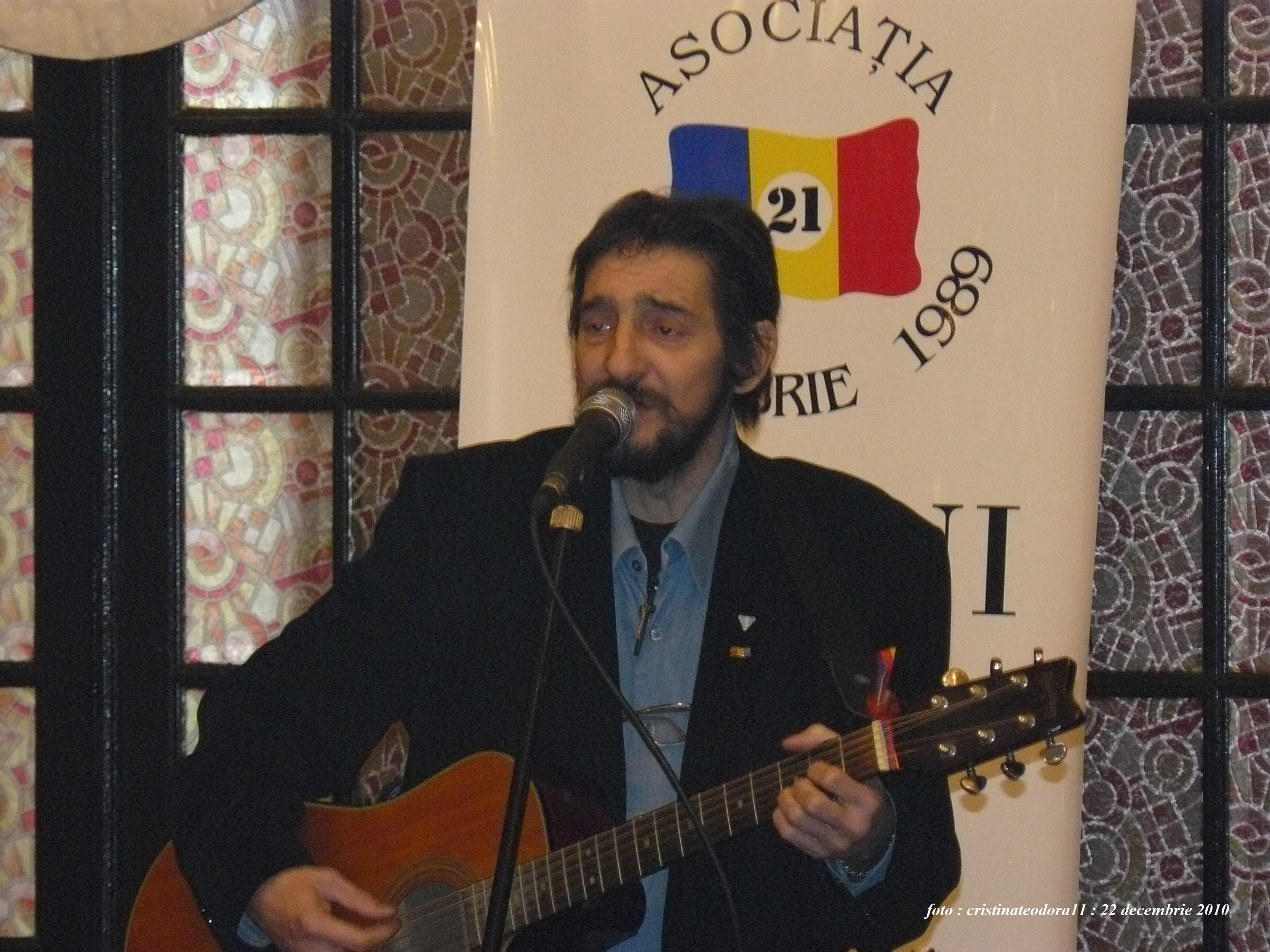
- Cristian Pațurcă (December 2010)

Background information
- Born: Cristian Pațurcă; September 10, 1964; Bucharest, Socialist Republic of Romania
- Died: 18 January 2011 (aged 46) Bucharest, Romania
- Genres: Folk; Rock
- Occupations: Singer, composer
- Instrument: Guitar
- Years active: 1981–2011

Cristian Pațurcă (10 September 1964 – 18 January 2011) was a Romanian songwriter, singer and composer renowned for his significant role in the Golaniad, a series of anti-communist protests that took place in 1990, in Bucharest. He is best remembered for singing "Imnul Golanilor" (The Hoodlums' Hymn) which became an anthem for the demonstrations.

== Early life and early musical career ==
Born in Bucharest, Romania, Pațurcă attended the "Tudor Vladimirescu" High School. In 1981, during his high school years, Pațurcă co-founded the band "Telefon" alongside George and Gabi Voiculescu. The group performed at various cultural venues across Bucharest, including local cultural centers and high school auditoriums. In the autumn of 1982, "Telefon" expanded its lineup to include Gabriel Andrieș as the lead vocalist and Mihai Negulescu on bass guitar, with Pațurcă continuing as the lead guitarist. This ensemble achieved notable success, securing first place at the National Festival "Cântarea României" and performing at several prominent clubs in Bucharest, such as "Tehnic Club," "Modern Club," and the "Mihai Eminescu" Cultural Center.

In 1989, Pațurcă joined the rock band „Rond”, alongside Călin Murg, Andrei Stanoievici, Florin Russo și Cristian Neag, gaining the trophy „Conexiuni Rock – Cluj-Napoca 1989” and other awards at festivals throughout the country, including some at Târgu Mureș, Buzău and Bacău. That same year, the band also clinched first place at the "Gala Muzicii Tinere" festival in Bacău.

Imnul Golanilor (The Hoodlums' Hymn)
Original Romanian-language lyrics	English translation
A fost o dată ca-n povești A fost în România, O gașcă mare de „golani", Ce-au alungat sclavia. Noi nu ne-am confundat nicicînd Cu „oamenii de bine", Numiți și neocomuniști Și fără de rușine. Refren: Mai bine haimana, Decît trădător, Mai bine huligan, Decît dictator, Mai bine „golan", Decît activist, Mai bine mort, Decît comunist. Vrem libertate, Nu comunism Și nici schimbări de formă Și de aceea, securiști, Să nu ne puneți normă. Noi nu vrem neocomunism, Nici neolibertate, „Democrații" originale Și nici minciuni sfruntate. Refren Ne-ați întrebat ce vrem aici Dar știe toată țara, Că noi susținem punctul 8 De la Timișoara. Să cadă patru-șapte-trei Ce ține TVR, Legînd în lanțurile ei, Chiar și cuvintele! Refren Alegeri fără comuniști, Fără nomenclatură, Și nu vă temeți de „golani" Fără coloratură. Din cei care au murit aici Ne-am reîntors năluci Să nu mai fie cum a fost Măcelul de atunci. Refren: Mai bine haimana, Decît trădător, Mai bine huligan, Decît dictator, Mai bine „golan", Decît activist, Mai bine mort, Decît comunist!	Once upon a time, like in a story, There was in Romania, A big bunch of "hoodlums", Who banished the slavery. We never confused ourselves With the "men of good", Also called neo-communists, And with no shame. Chorus: Better a vagabond Than a traitor, Better a hooligan Than a dictator, Better a hoodlum Than an activist, Better dead Than a communist. We want liberty, Not communism, And no fake changes, And therefore, Securitate agents, Don't impose norms on us. We don't want neo-communism, Nor neo-liberty, Original "democracies" And no blatant lies. Chorus You asked us what we want here, But the whole country knows, We support the 8th point From Timișoara. May four-seven-three fall, Which holds the TVR, Binding in its chains Even the words! Chorus Elections without communists, Without the nomenclature, And don’t fear the "hooligans", Without any coloratura. From those who died, We’ve returned as ghosts, So the there will never be, The massacre from then. Chorus: Better a vagabond Than a traitor, Better a hooligan Than a dictator, Better a hoodlum Than an activist, Better dead Than a communist!

== Role in the Golaniad ==
In the spring of 1990, Romania was undergoing significant political turmoil following the fall of the communist regime. Pro-democracy protesters gathered in Bucharest's University Square to oppose the transformation of the National Salvation Front into a political party and to demand genuine democratic reforms. The term "golan" (roughly meaning "hoodlum") was initially used pejoratively by the acting president Ion Iliescu to describe the protesters; however, they embraced the label, turning it into a symbol of their resistance. It was during these demonstrations that Pațurcă sang "Imnul Golanilor," a song that resonated deeply with the protesters and became emblematic of their struggle.

Beyond "Imnul Golanilor," Pațurcă wrote and performed several other songs that captured the spirit of the protests, including "Jos comunismul" (Down with Communism), "Cântecul baricadei" (Song of the Barricade), "Libertate, te iubim!" (Liberty, we love you!), "Vivat Golania" (Long Live the Hoodlums), "Scrisoare din Piața Universității" (Letter from the University Square), "Nu plecăm acasă!" (We aren't going home!) and "Golan post-mortem" (Hoodlum Post-Mortem). In 2010, the then-president of Romania, Traian Băsescu, awarded Pațurcă the National Order of Faithful Service in April 2010, 20 years after the Golaniad.

== Later years and death ==
In 2009, Pațurcă was twice evicted from his childhood home, the second time while he was in a hospital in Vălenii de Munte.

Throughout his later years, Pațurcă battled health issues, including tuberculosis and liver problems, which ultimately led to his untimely death on January 18, 2011, at the age of 46. He was laid to rest in Bucharest's Bellu Cemetery, on the Artists' Alley, alongside other notable Romanian cultural figures such as Tatiana Stepa, Florian Pittiș, and Adrian Pintea. A year after his death, a monument in his honor was placed near University Square, in front of the National Theatre Bucharest.

The president during the Golaniad, and the one who called on miners to attack the protesters during the June 1990 Mineriad, Ion Iliescu declared: "It is, generallly, regrettable that a young man like him succumbed at a... how should I say, still young age. He is a talented man too. I did not have any grudge from this point of view towards people like Pațurcă. It was the simple expression of some positions and that is what I wanted after the December Revolution. I wanted a democracy; that also means diverse opinions".

== See also ==
- Golaniad
- June 1990 Mineriad
