= Stelian Tănase =

Romanian activist (born 1952)

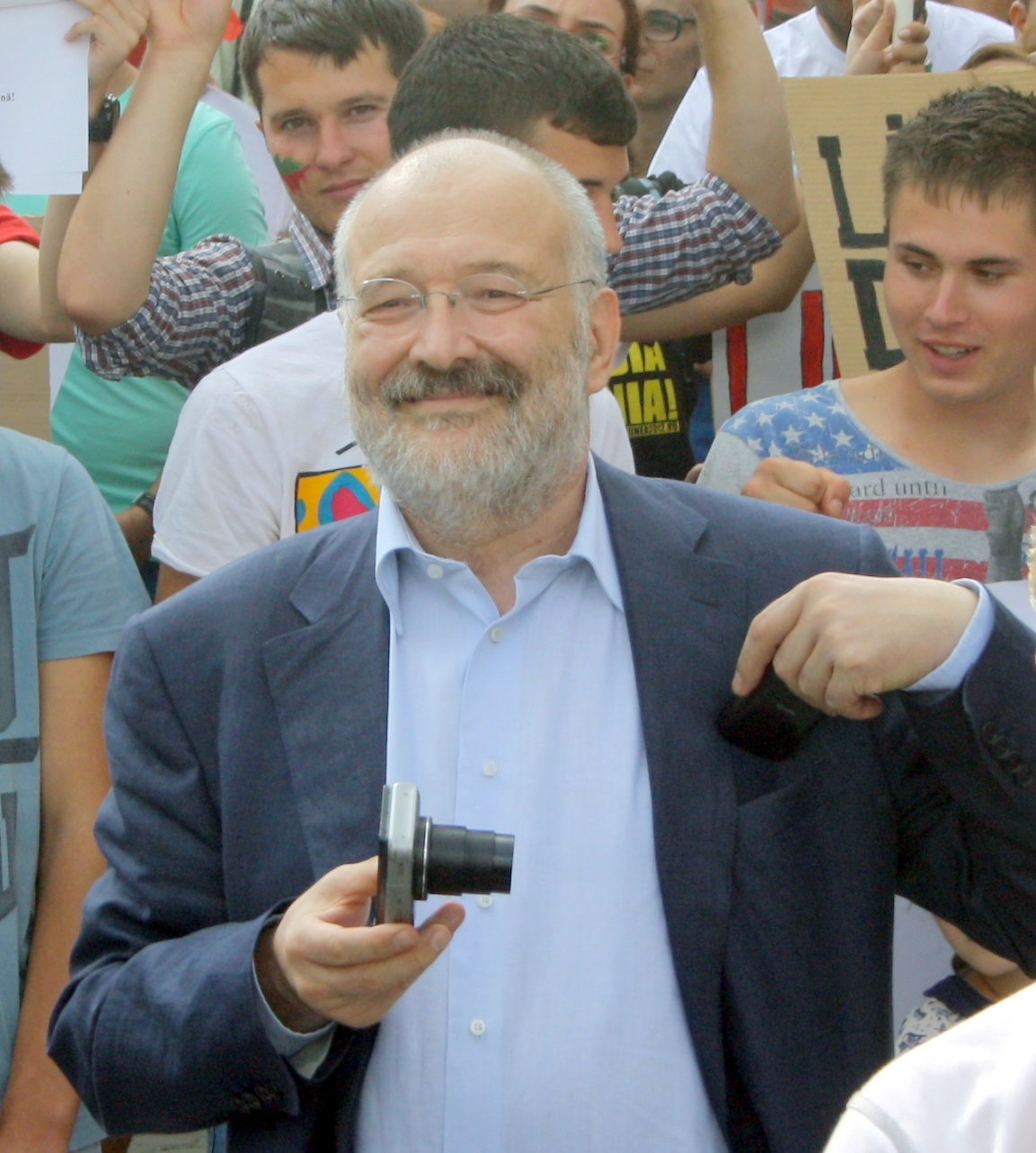
Stelian Tănase

Stelian Tănase (born February 17, 1952) is a Romanian writer, journalist, political analyst, and talk show host. Tănase was from November 2013 to October 2015 the president of TVR. Having briefly engaged in politics during the early 1990s, after the fall of the Communist regime, he has remained a leading figure of the Romanian civil society.

Stelian Tănase founded 22 magazine in January 1990 and was its first editor-in-chief. A founding member of both the Group for Social Dialogue and the Civic Alliance, Stelian Tănase was the latter's vice-president between 1991 and 1993. In 1992, he founded Sfera Politicii; he is a managing editor of both, as well as a regular contributor to various Romanian newspapers. Over the years, he was the host of several talk shows (2 plus 1 and Orient express for Antena 1; Maşina de tocat for TVR 1; Zece și un sfert, Zece fix, Tănase și Dinescu, and 3 X 3 for Realitatea TV).

Tănase is also vocal in the campaign to declassify all files kept in Securitate archives; in March 2002, he invited on his talk show a discussion with his best friend, after it was revealed that the latter had been a Securitate informant who regularly furnished information on Tănase himself.

== Biography ==
Born in Bucharest, he graduated from the local university's Faculty of Philosophy in 1977. Before 1989, two out of his first three books were banned by the Communist regime's censorship apparatus.

Tănase became a public figure soon after the Romanian Revolution of December 1989: in 1990, he was one of the main organizers of Piața Universității marathon protest, Golaniada, the protest movement against former members of the Romanian Communist Party who had gained power during the Revolution.

After July 1991, Tănase sided with the group inside the Civic Alliance that called for the organization's transformation into a political party. As a member of the newly created Civic Alliance Party inside the opposition alliance (the Romanian Democratic Convention), he was elected to the Chamber of Deputies for the 1992–1996 legislature, representing the city of Bucharest. He was vice-president of the Parliamentary Committee for Foreign Affairs (until April 1995) and member of the Special Committee for the Advancing a Legislative Proposal Regarding the Functioning of Political Parties.

In 2006, he was chosen as a member of the Presidential Commission for the Study of the Communist Dictatorship in Romania by its president, Vladimir Tismăneanu. The Commission was founded by President Traian Băsescu in order to provide for an official and academic basis for condemning the Romanian communist regime. This took place on December 18, 2006, when the President presented the Commission's 660 pages report to Parliament, making Romania the first Eastern Bloc country to officially condemn its communist regime.

== Academia ==
In 1996, he was granted a Ph.D. in political sociology by the University of Bucharest. A visiting professor at the University of California, Los Angeles Sociology Department in 1997, he currently teaches at the University of Bucharest's Faculty of Political Sciences.

Tănase was the recipient of several fellowships: Visiting Short-Term Fellow (1993) and Visiting Scholar (1994) at the Woodrow Wilson International Center for Scholars, granted a Visiting Short Term Collaborative research project at the University of California, Los Angeles (with Gail Kligman in 1996); a Fulbright scholar, post-Ph.D. grant, The New School for Social Research (1997); Visiting Short Term Scholar at the Holocaust Memorial Museum in Washington, D.C. (1998).

He has held conferences in Rome, Paris, Oslo, Vienna, Budapest, Washington, D.C., and also at prestigious American universities: the University of California, Los Angeles, the University of California, Berkeley, Stanford University, New York University, Columbia University, the University of Maryland, and The New School for Social Research.

== Works ==
=== Novels ===
- 1982 - Luxul melancoliei ("The Luxury of Melancholy"); 2 nd ed. 1993
- 1990 - Corpuri de iluminat ("Lighting Bodies"), written 1985-1987; 2 nd ed. 1998, 3 rd ed. 2004
- 1995 - Playback; 2 nd ed. 2004
- 2008 - Maestro
- 2010 - "Dracul şi Mumia" ("The Old Nick and the Mummy)
- 2011 - "Moartea unui dansator de tango" ("The death of the tango dancer"), translated into Italian and Spanish
- 2012 - "Skepsis. Cartea cu Poveşti".
- 2017 - "Nocturna cu vampir Opus 1". ("Nocturne with a Vampire opus no. 1")
- 2018 - "Partida de vânătoare" ("The Hunting")

=== Studies and essays ===
- 1993 - Şocuri şi crize ("Shocks and Crises"), collected political articles
- 1995 - Ora oficială de iarnă ("Official Winter Time"), diary 1986–1990
- 1996 - Sfidarea memoriei. Convorbiri cu Alexandru Paleologu ("Defying Memory. Conversations with Alexandru Paleologu")
- 1996 - Revoluţia ca eșec. Elite şi societate ("Revolution as Failure. Elites and Society"), political studies
- 1997 - Anatomia mistificării. Procesul Noica-Pillat ("Anatomy of Mystification. The Noica-Pillat Trial")
- 1998 - LA vs NY. Jurnal american ("LA vs NY. American Diary")
- 1998 - Elite și societate. Guvernarea Gheorghiu-Dej (1948–1965) ("Elites and Society. The Gheorghiu-Dej Government")
- 1999 - Miracolul revoluţiei. O istorie politică a căderii regimurilor comuniste ("The Miracle of Revolution. A Political History of the Fall of Communist Regimes")
- 2002 - Acasă se vorbeşte în șoaptă, Dosar & jurnal din anii târzii ai dictaturii ("At Home There is Only Speaking in a Whisper: File and Diary Recording in the Late Years of the Romanian Dictatorship"); contains excerpts from his file at the political police Securitate
- 2004 - Zei și semizei la început de secol ("Gods and Demigods at the Dawn of the Century")
- 2005 - Clienții lu' tanti Varvara. Povești clandestine ( "Aunt Varvara's Clients. Clandestine Stories"), translated into English and Spanish
- 2017 - "Dinastia" ( "The Dynasty")
- 2018 - "Conversații cu Regele Mihai" ("Talking with King Michael")

== Filmography ==
=== Directed ===
- 1991 - Piața Univesităţii - România ("University Square - Romania"), documentary

=== Screenplays ===
- 1999 - Asaltul cerului ("The Siege of the Sky"), documentary for Antena 1; 6 episodes
- 2000 - Struma, documentary for Antena 1
- 2004 - Vizionarii ("The Foreseers"), portraits of 19th and 20th century Romanian politicians (Mihail Kogălniceanu, Ion Brătianu, Nicolae Iorga, Nicolae Titulescu, Iuliu Maniu), documentary for Realitatea TV; 5 episodes
- 2004 - Istoria alegerilor în România secolului XX ("The History of Elections in 20th century Romania"), documentary for Realitatea TV; 6 episodes
- 2006 - Dinastia ("The Dynasty"), portraits of the four kings of the Romanians, documentary for the Romanian Television Company; 21 episodes

== Awards ==
- (Romania) Romanian Royal Family: Knight of the Royal Decoration of the Cross of the Romanian Royal House
- Order of the Star of Romania, Officer rank (2000)
