= Better dead than red =

Anti-communist slogan

"Better dead than red" is an anti-communist slogan.

== Etymology ==
Red is the emblematic color of communism and has thus become a synonym for "communist" (plural reds). Thus "better dead than red" means that 'one would rather die or be dead than to become or be a communist', and vice versa.

== History ==
The slogan became widespread during the Cold War, first gaining currency in the United States during the late 1950s, amid debates about anti-communism and nuclear disarmament.

The first phrase, "better red than dead", is often credited to British philosopher Bertrand Russell, but in his 1961 Has Man a Future? he attributes it to "West German friends of peace". In any event, Russell agreed with the sentiment, having written in 1958 that if "no alternatives remain except Communist domination or extinction of the human race, the former alternative is the lesser of two evils", and the slogan was adopted by the Campaign for Nuclear Disarmament, which he helped found.

The first known English-language use of either term came in 1930, long before their widespread popularity. In an editorial criticizing John Edgerton, a Tennessee businessman who had mandated morning prayers in his factories to help keep out "dangerous ideas", The Nation sarcastically wrote:

It is high time in any case that the workers learned to live by faith, not work. As for those weaklings who may fall by the wayside and starve to death, let the country bury them under the epitaph: Better Dead than Red.

The first known use of "better red than dead" came in August 1958, when the Oakland Tribune wrote: "The popular phrase 'better red than dead' has lost what appeal it ever had." As anti-communist fever took hold in mid-century, the version "better dead than red" became popular in the United States, especially during the McCarthy era. The quote was also used by Oleg Troyanovsky, the Permanent Representative of the Soviet Union to the United Nations in 1980 when a dissident Marxist group threw red paint on him and US ambassador William vanden Heuvel in the United Nations Security Council chamber.

With the end of the Cold War, the phrases have increasingly been repurposed as their original meanings have waned. For example, "better dead than red" is sometimes used as a schoolyard taunt aimed at redhaired children or Chinese American children. Some American alt-right groups such as Patriot Front have also used the phrase in their propaganda, in particular against Chinese Americans during the COVID-19 pandemic in the United States.

== Other languages ==
The phrases may have been invented or inspired by Germans. Folklorist Mac E. Barrick linked it to Lewwer duad üs Slaav ("better dead than a slave"), a phrase used by Prussian poet Detlev von Liliencron in his ballad Pidder Lüng. Later, in Nazi Germany, Slav replaced Slaav, giving the anti-Slavic "better dead than a Slav".

Also during the Nazi period, lieber tot als rot ("better dead than red") was used as a slogan. It is unclear whether it was the inspiration for either of the English phrases. The opposite slogan, lieber rot als tot ("better red than dead"), was popular among German speakers during the Cold War as well.

In the strong pacifist movement in France in 1937, Jean Giono, a leading spokesman, asked, "What's the worst that can happen if Germany invades France? Become Germans? For my part, I prefer being a living German to being a dead Frenchman."

Another version of the phrase took hold in Francoist Spain, adapted to Antes roja que rota ("better red than broken"), in reference to the threat posed by separatist groups in the regions of Catalonia and the Basque Country.

In Romania, during the Golaniad protest of 1990, a song Imnul golanilor by Cristian Pațurcă was written, that has become an anthem of the revolt. It contains the words Mai bine mort, decât comunist, which means Better dead than communist.

== See also ==
- Liever Turks dan Paaps ("Rather Turkish than Papist") – slogan used during the 16th-century Dutch Revolt
