= George Șerban =

Romanian journalist, politician and writer

Gheorghe Șerban (25 June 1954 – 31 December 1998) was a Romanian journalist, politician and writer, best known for his role in the writing of the Proclamation of Timișoara in the wake of the 1989 Revolution.

Șerban was born in Buzău. Before 1989, he taught Marxism at the Polytechnic University of Timișoara. After taking part in the Revolution, he became a member of the Timișoara Society and a journalist for Timișoara newspaper.

In 1994, he joined the Christian Democratic National Peasants' Party (PNȚ-CD) and was later elected to the Chamber of Deputies for Timiș County.
