= Mona Muscă =

Romanian philologist and politician

Mona Octavia Muscă (born Mona Octavia Nicoară; May 4, 1949) is a Romanian philologist and politician. A former member of the National Liberal Party (PNL) and of the Liberal Democratic Party (PLD), she was a member of the Romanian Chamber of Deputies for Caraș-Severin County from 1996 to 2004 and for Bucharest from 2004 to 2007. In the Călin Popescu-Tăriceanu cabinet, she served as Minister of Culture and Religious Affairs from 2004 to 2005.

== Biography ==
She was born in Turda and attended the Philology Faculty of the West University of Timișoara. Following graduation, she became assistant professor at her alma mater, teaching the Romanian language to foreign students. She was also a scientific researcher at the Romanian Academy's Iorgu Iordan Institute of Linguistics, with articles and speciality studies to her name.

Following the 1989 Revolution, Muscă joined the Civic Alliance Foundation and then the Civic Alliance Party, joining the PNL in 1995. She arrived in Parliament in 1996, on the lists of the Romanian Democratic Convention, surviving that alliance's 2000 defeat due to her closeness to Valeriu Stoica. In the Chamber, she sat on the committees for culture, art and mass media (1996–2007); equal opportunity between men and women (2000–2004; 2006–2007); and foreign policy (2007); and was vice president of the body from December 2004 to January 2005. During her legislative career, Muscă initiated bills on a number of subjects: setting up ROMPRES, legal holidays, prevention of cruelty to animals, protection for victims of domestic violence, national security, conflict of interest in public functions and free access to public information. It was this last proposal, made in 2001, that gave her public visibility, allowing her to cast herself as a link between politicians and civil society. She also helped initiate a lustration law, inspired by the Proclamation of Timișoara and meant to exclude from public office those "who were part of the power structures and repressive apparatus of the Communist regime". In 2004, she was the only politician to file a penal complaint against Prime Minister Adrian Năstase in the "Zambaccian" corruption case. Following the election that year, Năstase defeated her in her bid to become President of the Chamber of Deputies. Muscă instead was named Culture and Religious Affairs Minister by the new PNL Prime Minister Călin Popescu-Tăriceanu. She resigned in August 2005, citing incompatibility with Tăriceanu, whom she had criticised for not calling early elections. Within her party, she was a vice president of the PNL.

In August 2006, Evenimentul Zilei newspaper published documents indicating that Muscă had collaborated with the Securitate secret police during the 1970s. In response, she made public a collaboration agreement signed in March 1977, in which she accepted the code name "Dana" and agreed to provide information about foreign students. She expressed her regret at having signed, but said she did not realise this would involve her in collaboration with the secret police. A dossier attests that she gave 15 notes containing information to the secret police, although only two such written documents were discovered. The following month, the PNL removed her from the party and the CNSAS, an institution charged with investigating Securitate affiliations, declared her a collaborator. Later that year, she challenged the ruling, which the CNSAS then affirmed. She also joined the new PLD about that time. In March 2007, the Bucharest Court of Appeal confirmed the CNSAS verdict, prompting her resignation from Parliament and from the PLD. Although she faced prison or a fine for having issued an official declaration stating she had not collaborated with the Securitate, in 2010 prosecutors decided not to press charges against her.

Muscă divorced her first husband around the time of her Securitate collaboration. In 1982, she married Gavril Muscă, head of the Bucharest Chemical Energy Institute and a friend of the Ceaușescu family that then led Romania. She has one daughter.

== Notes ==
Government offices
Preceded by Răzvan Theodorescu	Minister of Culture of Romania; 2004 – 2005	Succeeded by Adrian Iorgulescu
