= Golaniad =

1990 protest in Bucharest, Romania

- Part of the aftermath of the Romanian Revolution
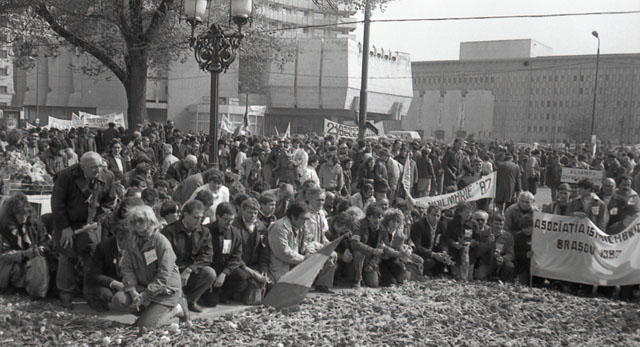
- A rally in University Square, Bucharest, 1990
- Date: 22 April–15 June 1990
- Location: Bucharest, Romania
- Caused by: Refusal of the government to follow the Proclamation of Timișoara
- Goals: Removal of former Communist Party members from power
- Methods: Demonstration; Revolt; Civil disobedience; Vandalism

Parties
Anti-government protesters Opposition parties: Christian Democratic National Peasants' Party; National Liberal Party; Romanian Social Democratic Party	Government of Romania: Jiu Valley miners; Romanian Police; Political support: National Salvation Front

Lead figures
Marian Munteanu; Corneliu Coposu; Radu Câmpeanu; Sergiu Cunescu	Miron Cozma; Ion Iliescu; Petre Roman

Casualties
- Deaths: 6 (official) over 100 (claims by opposition press)
- Injuries: 746–1,000

The Golaniad (Romanian: Golaniada pronounced [ɡolaniˈada], from the word golan meaning "hoodlum") was a protest in Romania in the University Square, Bucharest. It was initiated by students and professors at the University of Bucharest.

The Golaniad started in April 1990, before the election of 20 May 1990, which was the first election after the Romanian Revolution of December 1989. Their main demand was that former leading members of the Communist Party should be banned from standing in elections.

== Background ==
Ion Iliescu and the National Salvation Front (FSN) seized power during the 1989 revolution. The FSN organization was meant to act as a temporary government until free elections were to be held. However, on 23 January 1990, despite its earlier claims, it decided to become a party and to run in the elections it would organize. Some of the dissenters and anti-communists who joined the FSN during the revolution (including Doina Cornea) left following this decision.

Many of the FSN personalities, including its president, Iliescu, were ex-communists and as such the revolution was seen as being hijacked by the FSN. The FSN, which was widely known from the revolution and associated with it, won 66.3% of the votes, while the next party – the Democratic Union of Hungarians in Romania – obtained only 7.2% of the votes, followed by the National Liberal Party at 6.4%, with the Ecological Movement of Romania (MER) and the Christian Democratic National Peasants' Party (PNȚ-CD) trailing at around 2.6% (see 1990 Romanian general election).

== The protests ==
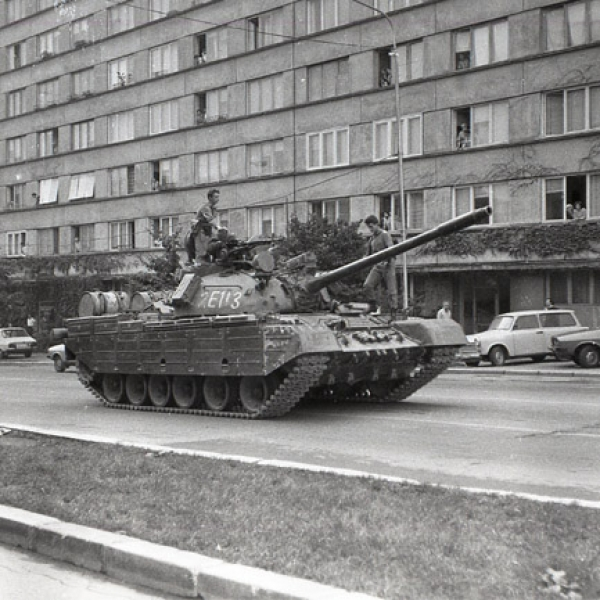
TR-85 tank in Bucharest in early 1990, during the Golaniad.

On 22 April 1990, the Independent Group for Democracy (Grupul Independent pentru Democrație) organised a demonstration in Aviators' Square. After the peaceful demonstration, groups of people marched towards the Romanian Television (TVR) station, calling for its political independence. The following day, the PNȚ-CD organized an even larger protest (around 2,500–3,000 people), occupying the road in the University Square, and some protesters decided to sit-in overnight.

The protests drew the ire of the authorities, who, during the night of 23–24 April, began a repression of the protesters. The law enforcement agents beat up the protesters and arrested some of them. The authorities' violence had the exact opposite effect than the one expected, as more people came. Two days later, they were still there, their numbers growing; on the evening of 25 April, their number reached 30,000. The sympathetic press reported even higher numbers, up to 50,000 each evening. A number of protesters began a hunger strike.

President Ion Iliescu refused to negotiate with the protesters and called them "golani" ("golan" meaning a hooligan, a scamp, a ruffian, or a good-for-nothing – which later gave the protest its name) or legionnaires.

The leadership of the National Salvation Front realized that the protests grew too big to be able to repress them with impunity, so it focused on demonizing them in the state-controlled media. This part of the media called the protesters "delinquents", "hooligans", "parasites", "thieves", "extremists", "fascists", "traitors", etc. This campaign was successful particularly outside Bucharest, where the government-owned media was the only source of information. Public television showed reports of the protests in which they interviewed people marginal to both the protests and the Romanian society, such as Roma people, hawksters, and prowlers.

== Name and anthem ==
The ending "-ad" ("-ada" in Romanian) was used ironically, since many of Nicolae Ceaușescu's Communist manifestations had endings like this, for instance the annual national sporting event Daciad (in order to compare them either with an epic, like the Iliad or, rather, with the international Olympiad). The protesters also composed their own hymn, "Imnul Golanilor":

Mai bine haimana, decât trădător
Mai bine huligan, decât dictator
Mai bine golan, decât activist
Mai bine mort decât comunist

— lyrics by Laura Botolan; music by Cristian Pațurcă
Translation:

Better to be a tramp than a traitor,
Better to be a hooligan than a dictator,
Better to be a hoodlum than an activist,
Better to be dead than communist

== Support ==
Many intellectuals supported the protests, including writers such as Octavian Paler, Ana Blandiana, Gabriel Liiceanu, Stelian Tănase, and film director Lucian Pintilie. Renowned playwright Eugène Ionesco supported them by sending a telegram from France in which he wrote he was a "Golan Academician" (Hooligan Academician).

== Demands ==
The three main demands of the protesters were as follows.

1. The eighth point of the Proclamation of Timișoara: leading members of the Romanian Communist Party and the Securitate not to be allowed to be candidates in the elections.
2. Access to the state-owned mass media for all candidates, not only FSN candidates. A 1975 law of Ceaușescu (which was not yet repealed) allowed the President of Romania to directly control Romanian Television and Radio.
3. Postponing of the elections, since the only party that had the resources for the campaign was FSN.

The protesters also disagreed with the official doctrine of the FSN that the Revolution was only "anti-Ceaușescu" and not "anti-Communist" (as Silviu Brucan declared in an interview given to the British newspaper The Guardian). They also supported faster reforms, shock-therapy to usher in an unregulated free market, and a liberal-style democracy (Ion Iliescu argued for a "Swedish-style" socialism and an "original democracy", considering multi-party system as being antiquated).

After the elections the protests continued, the main goal being the removal of the government.

== Violent ending ==
After 52 days of protests, on 13–15 June, a violent confrontation with government supporters and miners from the Jiu Valley ended the protests, with many of the protesters and bystanders being beaten and wounded. Sources differ on the number of the casualties, the government confirming seven deaths related to the events.

== See also ==
- Proclamation of Timișoara
- Lustration
