= Proclamation of Timișoara =

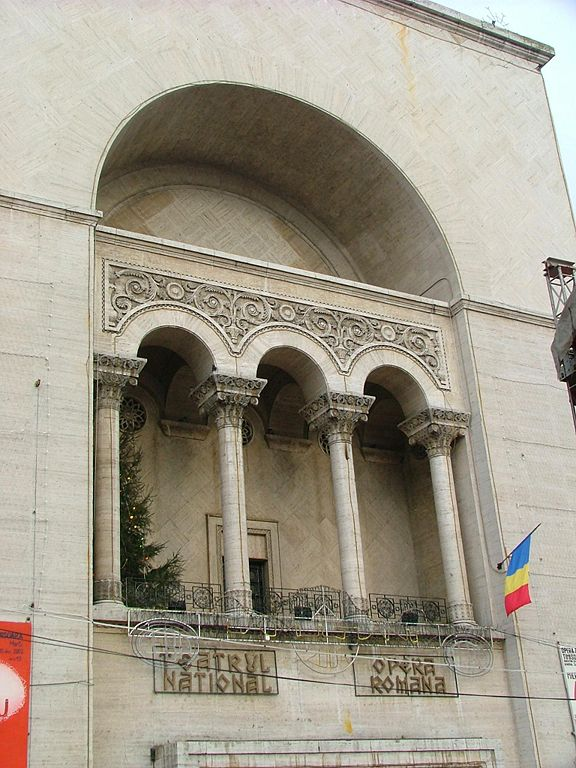
The National Opera balcony, where the document was read for the first time

The Proclamation of Timișoara was a thirteen-point written document, drafted on March 11, 1990, by the Timișoara participants in Romania's 1989 Revolution, and partly issued in reaction to the first Mineriad. Organized as the Timișoara Society and other bodies of students and workers, the signers expressed liberal-democratic goals, which they saw as representing the revolutionary legacy. The best-known requirement formed the document's 8th Point, calling for all former Romanian Communist Party nomenklatura and Securitate cadres to be banned from holding public office for a period of 10 years (or three consecutive legislatures), with an emphasis on the office of President (see Lustration). Questioning the status of the governing National Salvation Front, the Proclamation argued that the latter primarily represented a small group of Communist dissidents who had opposed Nicolae Ceauşescu's authoritarian regime and had subsequently monopolized power. These requirements replicated the earlier manifesto authored in Bucharest by philosopher Gabriel Liiceanu (Apel către lichele, the "Appeal to the Scoundrels").

Over the following period, the document was recognized and advocated by hundreds of civic associations, while almost 4 million citizens signed appeals in favor of incorporating the 8th Point into electoral law. The latter was also one of the main requests of the Bucharest Golaniad (which was violently repressed during the third Mineriad in June of the same year).

== Character ==
In its final shape, the text owed much to the inspiration of George Şerban, a local academic and writer. According to historian Victor Neumann, Șerban was in turn inspired by his collaborator Alexandra Indrieş, an influential intellectual and a former political prisoner during the 1950s. After being written down, the Proclamation was publicly read by Șerban from the National Opera's balcony.

One of the purposes stated in the document was the explicit condemnation of Communism. Proclaiming class solidarity, the text opposed "the typically communist method of domination by spreading feuds among social classes". While expressing the will of "not copy[ing] the western capitalist systems with their drawbacks and inequities", the 10th Point of the Proclamation argued in favor of privatization (expressed ideally under the form of "distributing the stocks equally among the workers, the state keeping only those funds that may ensure the control of the activity") and immediate investments in the public sector (as a means to prevent the consequences of inflation). The 11th Point also made mention of Timișoara's openness to a market economy, decentralization, and foreign capital, proposing for a foreign trade bank to be opened in the city. The text also expressed a hope that members of the Romanian diaspora who had left the country under the Communist regime were to return to their homeland and contribute to the society, and set itself against the portion of the public "who, instigated by obscure forces, abused the returned exiles".

A similar call for solidarity was expressed in regard to ethnic relations (the document stated opposition to all forms of "chauvinism", depicting Timișoara as the paramount representative of "the spirit of tolerance and mutual respect, the sole principles reigning in the future European House"), and a multi-party system based on free elections was endorsed, with the exclusion of "extremist [parties], be they leftist or rightist". The document also proposed that the Romanian Communist Party had failed to meet the criteria for participation in Romanian politics, having "discredited itself by degenerating into red fascism". In its 7th Point, the Proclamation indicated that activists of the Communist Party had displayed "cowardice" as early as 1979, by refusing to join Constantin Pîrvulescu in open disobedience to Ceaușescu. The 6th point condemned "prejudice" and "manipulation" against the emerging opposition parties (specifically, the historical National Peasants' Party and National Liberals), citing examples where the "groups interested in resuscitating communism" had incited public sentiment with slogans of reportedly Stalinist inspiration.

Neumann attributed several of the radical social and economic goals, as well as the moral discourse associated with the 8th Point requirements, to the authors' awareness of Marxist theories (for a certain period, George Şerban had taught Marxism at the Timișoara Polytechnic University). While commending the document for thus identifying and radically condemning Communist practices, he expressed his personal opposition to the 8th Point, which he believed to be rooted in "Marxist historicism" and attempting to impose a "moral code" in "situations [that] call for a series of compromises".

A final demand regarded proposals that December 22, the date of revolutionary victory in Bucharest, be proclaimed the national holiday of Romania. The text argued against such a move, and, citing the example of Bastille Day in France, proposed December 16, when revolution broke in Timișoara, as the moment of celebration. Eventually, the 1991 Constitution enforced an unrelated event, Union Day (December 1), as the legal holiday.

== Aftermath ==
Bucharest landmark reflecting the views of Golaniad participants and proclaiming University Square as a "zone free from neocommunism"

Authors have attributed the limited success of the Proclamation movement to both resistance from surviving Communist structures and the special characteristics of Timișoara in relation to the rest of the country. Victor Neumann mentioned contrasts observed during the Revolution itself, when "only a few cities rebelled [...] alongside Timișoara: Arad, Lugoj, Sibiu, Cluj, Braşov, Bucharest, Iaşi". He attributed this pattern to political, economic and social discrepancies between various areas of the country, ones he believed to have been prolonged in post-Revolution Romania. Analyst Enikő Baga contended that policy differences also remained notable between Timișoara and its subordinate Timiș County.

While commenting on the multi-ethnic character of the Revolution as mirrored in the Proclamation itself, Steven D. Roper made mention of the nationalist revival which was made obvious less than a week after the document was publicized (culminating in the ethnic clashes of Târgu Mureş and the creation of the Romanian National Unity Party). At the time, the National Salvation Front accused the Proclamation of seeking political autonomy for the Banat.

The Proclamation of Timișoara was unsuccessful in its goal of shaping electoral procedures: the presidential and legislative election of May 1990 were carried without lustration requirements. Results confirmed the victory of the National Salvation Front as ruling party and of Ion Iliescu, a former Communist official who had opposed Ceaușescu, as President.

Despite this outcome, although reduced in amplitude, the Golaniad protests continued in Bucharest's University Square, and gave ongoing support to the Proclamation. In his previous polemic with the demonstrators, Iliescu argued that the Proclamation was likely to cause "a dangerous witch-hunt". Leaders of the protest rejected this view, indicating that the Proclamation did not call for punishment, but rather for accurate representation. After the controversial intervention of Romanian Police forces, and retaliation from the protesters, the newly-elected president made a public appeal which resulted in a violent intervention by groups of miners arriving from the Jiu Valley.

== Legacy ==
The cause of lustration as prescribed by the Timișoara 8th Point was advocated in Parliament by representatives of National Peasants' Party and National Liberal Party, but faced opposition from the governing National Salvation Front and its successor party — which eventually grouped itself as the Social Democratic Party.

On May 27, 1999, following the elections of 1996 which confirmed the victory of the Romanian Democratic Convention (CDR, comprising the National Peasants' and National Liberal Party together with other groups), a legislative project seeking this goal was proposed inside the Chamber of Deputies by George Şerban, elected as a National Peasants' Party member; however, since 1997, the 8th Point was disavowed by the new President Emil Constantinescu, who stressed his belief that it was "no longer applicable".

The project remained to be analyzed by the Chamber's Judicial Committee over the following seven months, and many of its provisions were ultimately objected to, while it failed to win a parallel verdict from Prime Minister Mugur Isărescu; it was outvoted by a new Social Democratic majority in February 2001, following the 2000 elections. (Șerban had died in late December 1998.)

According to several commentators, the project was intentionally blocked. The journal Evenimentul Zilei indicated the Social Democrat parliamentarian Dan Marţian, who served as president of the Commission and whose position was threatened by lustration, as one of those responsible for the alleged action.

In the wake of the 2004 elections, confirming the victory of the Justice and Truth grouping comprising National Liberals and Democrats, lustration was again brought to the attention of Parliament. This involved two separate projects: that of National Initiative Party politicians Cozmin Guşă, Lavinia Șandru and Aurelian Pavelescu was rejected in Senate (November 2005); a second one, advocated by National Liberal parliamentarians Adrian Cioroianu, Mona Muscă, Viorel Oancea, and Mihăiţă Calimente and backed by the Timișoara Society, was eventually adopted by the Senate in early April 2006. It won additional backing from the Association of Former Political Prisoners and its president, Constantin Ticu Dumitrescu.

Of the proposals, the former was more radical, calling for lustration to be applied permanently to all persons occupying public office under the Communist regime (whereas the National Liberal project restricts it to Communist Party and Union of Communist Youth active cadres, as well as to persons engaged in political policing in relation to the Securitate). At the time of its presentation to Parliament, Cioroianu stated: "The law will be a real test of morality for the political parties". In parallel, British historian Dennis Deletant has argued that lustration was intrinsically connected with the necessity for publicizing Securitate files kept by the CNSAS and the Romanian Intelligence Service. He also contrasted the manifest delays in Romanian procedures with the similar processes in three other former Eastern Bloc countries (Poland, the Czech Republic, and Hungary).
