= Editura Curtea Veche =

Romanian publishing house

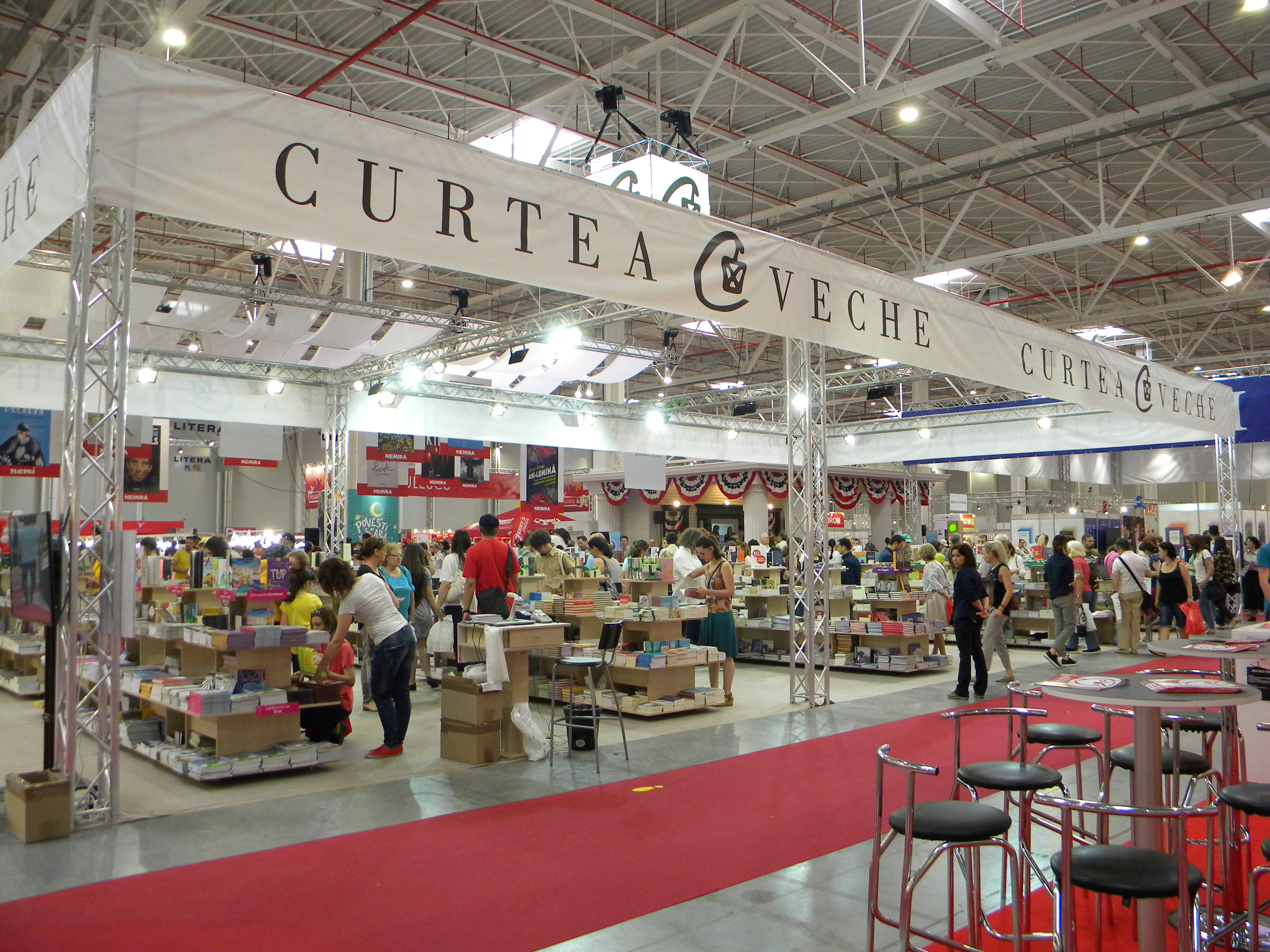
Curtea Veche's stand at the "Târgul Internațional de Carte Bookfest 2018" in Bucharest

Editura Curtea Veche (Curtea Veche Publishing House) is a publishing house based in Romania, located on Aurel Vlaicu Street 35, Bucharest. It has a tradition in editing works of Romanian literature. After the Romanian Revolution of 1989, Curtea Veche started editing more foreign books, such as BBC reports or the Complete Idiot's Guides.
