= Grand Hotel Bucharest =

- Interactive map of the Grand Hotel Bucharest area

General information
- Status: Completed
- Type: Hotel
- Location: 4 Bulevardul Nicolae Bălcescu, Bucharest, Romania
- Coordinates: 44°26′14″N 26°06′08″E
- Construction started: 1967
- Completed: 1970
- Opening: 23 May 1971

Height
- Roof: 87 metres (285 ft)

Technical details
- Floor count: 24

Design and construction
- Architects: Dinu Hariton, Gheorghe Nădrag, Ion Moscu, and Romeo Belea

The Grand Hotel Bucharest is a 24-story 87 m (285 ft) high-rise five-star hotel situated near University Square, Bucharest, in Sector 1. Opened in 1971 as the Inter-Continental Bucharest, it is a city landmark.

== History ==
Designed by Dinu Hariton, Gheorghe Nădrag, Ion Moscu, and Romeo Belea, the hotel was part of a larger development that included the Bucharest National Theatre. Construction began in 1967, and the hotel opened on 23 May 1971 as the Inter-Continental Bucharest. At the time, it was the second tallest building in the city, after the Stalinist "Casa Scînteii" ('Spark Building'). Although it no longer holds that title today, it is still the tallest hotel in Bucharest.

It became the hotel of choice for members of the foreign press in Bucharest. During the Romanian Revolution of 1989, the balconies of the Inter-Continental were used to report on the protests in the adjacent University Square.

The hotel was renamed slightly in 2003, becoming the InterContinental Bucharest, when the chain was reorganized and dropped the hyphen from its name. In 2007 the hotel transitioned from a long-standing franchise agreement to a management contract with the InterContinental Hotels Group. The hotel ceased to be managed by IHG on January 1, 2022, and was renamed Grand Hotel Bucharest. It is set for an EUR 21 million renovation, scheduled for completion in 2024.

== Description ==
The building is designed so that each room has a unique panorama of the city. The highest 2 floors (21 and 22) contain a club lounge, conference rooms and a health centre with an outdoor terrace, indoor swimming pool and fitness centre. The hotel complies with the triskaidekaphobic numbering system of the floors. The first 12 levels above ground are numbered from 1 to 12 and the next 12 levels are numbered from 14 to 25.

The Imperial Apartment at the 19th floor has two bedrooms and a total area of 240 square meters. The apartment contains white Italian walnut furniture polished with gold and Murano glass light fixtures. In its living room there is a fully functioning Steinway & Sons white piano which was specially brought in for Nigel Kennedy's stay at the hotel in winter 2007.

== In culture ==
- Some scenes of the Romanian movie Nea Mărin Miliardar were shot in the Imperial Apartment of the Intercontinental Hotel Bucharest.
