= Marian Munteanu =

Student leader

Marian Munteanu (born 19 June 1962, in Grădiștea, Comana, Giurgiu, Socialist Republic of Romania) is a former leader of the anti-government protests that took place in 1990 in Romania against the National Salvation Front (FSN). The anti-government protests were ended violently by the intervention of the miners from Jiu Valley (known as the first Mineriad). During the early 1990s, he was also the leader of the far-right political organization "Mișcarea pentru România" (The Movement for Romania).

At the same time, Munteanu was the leader of the Students' League, which was one of the organizers of the protests against Ion Iliescu's first rule in post-1989 Romania. On 14 June 1990, he was severely beaten. A miner was later imprisoned for attempted murder following witnesses' declarations that he had tried to kill Munteanu with an axe. He was arrested and detained at Jilava Prison between June 18 and August 2, 1990.

As a leader of "Mișcarea pentru România" (defunct since 1996), he wrote several articles expressing his admiration for the Iron Guard, a local fascist movement active before World War II. Consequently, he has been condemned for antisemitic discourse by various public figures, most notably literary critic Nicolae Manolescu. In 2000, Munteanu was presented as a presidential candidate by the party led by Virgil Măgureanu, former Securitate officer and first head of the Romanian Intelligence Service (SRI), though he eventually withdrew from the race.

As of 2011, he was teaching ethnology, anthropology, and folklore at the University of Bucharest.

Munteanu returned to politics in 2016 after accepting PNL's proposal as candidate for mayor of Bucharest for that year's local elections. The proposal was regarded controversial, coming after the previous candidate, Ludovic Orban, was withdrawn as a result of his prosecution for corruption by the National Anticorruption Directorate (DNA).

Munteanu has been accused of being a former collaborator of the Securitate, Nicolae Ceaușescu's secret police. He was approached by the secret police after he became a confidant of Petre Țuțea, with the purpose of keeping under surveillance the former anti-communist.

Munteanu refused to sign an official proof of integrity document, as required of candidates for public positions. Several organizations and even the National Liberal Party (PNL) have filed official requests with the National Council for the Study of the Securitate Archives (CNSAS), to check the ties he might have had with the Securitate before 1989. Following public outcry, the National Liberals decided to eventually drop him as party candidate.

Later in 2016, Munteanu created a new political movement in order to run in the year's elections for the Parliament.
