= Lustration =

Scrutinizing the communist past of public officials

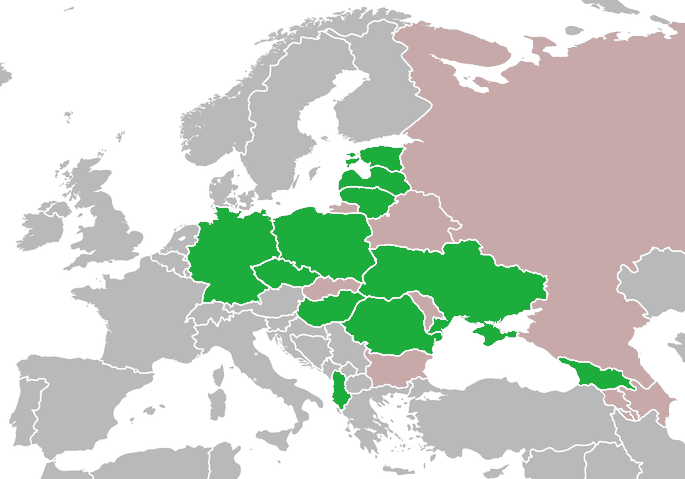
Lustration map of Europe, with green representing some form of lustration; pink no lustration; and grey not a former Warsaw Pact member

Lustration in Central and Eastern Europe is the official public procedure of scrutinizing a public official or a candidate for public office in terms of their history as a witting confidential collaborator (informant) of relevant former communist secret police, an activity widely condemned by the public opinion of those states as morally corrupt due to its essential role in suppressing political opposition and enabling persecution of dissidents. Surfacing of evidence for such a past activity typically inflicts severe damage to the reputation of the person concerned. It should not be confused with decommunization, which is the process of barring former communist regular officials from public offices as well as eliminating communist symbols.

The principle of non-retroactivity means that a past role of a confidential collaborator (informant) is alone as such inadmissible from the beginning for criminal prosecution or conviction, thus, lustration allows at least to bring such past collaborators to moral responsibility by making the public opinion aware of the established outcomes through their free dissemination. Another motivation was the fear that undisclosed past confidential collaboration could be used to blackmail public officials by foreign intelligence services of other former Warsaw Pact allies, in particular Russia.

Depending on jurisdiction, either every positive result or only the one obtained regarding a person who falsely declared otherwise may trigger consequences varying greatly among jurisdictions, ranging from mere infamy to purging the person from office and a 10-year exclusion from holding public offices. Various forms of lustration were employed in post-communist Europe.

== Etymology ==
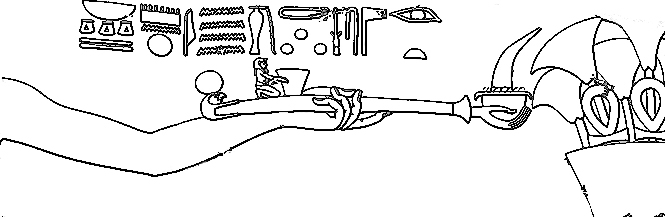
Drawing of a relief from the Karnak temple in Egypt showing a pharaoh lustrating with incense

Lustration in general is the process of making something clear or transparent, usually by means of a propitiatory offering. The term is taken from the ancient Roman lustratio purification rituals.

== Policies and laws ==
After the fall of the various European Communist governments with the Revolutions of 1989 between 1989 and 1992, government-sanctioned policies of "mass disqualification of those associated with the abuses under the prior regime" were initiated as part of the wider decommunization campaigns.

Lustration in turn targets former confidential informants of the communist secret police who remain in or apply for political positions or even civil service positions, rather than former communist regular officials. In some countries, however, lustration laws did not lead to indiscriminate exclusion and disqualification, taking into account that people were often blackmailed to become informants or coerced into providing information without realising its true recipient. Lustration law in Hungary (1994–2003) was based on the exposure of compromised state officials, while lustration law in Poland (1999–2005) depended on confession. Lustration law "is a special public employment law that regulates the process of examining whether a person holding certain higher public positions collaborated confidentially with the repressive apparatus of the communist regime." The "special" nature of lustration law refers to its transitional character. As of 1996, various lustration laws of varying scope were implemented in the Czech Republic, Slovakia, Hungary, Macedonia, Albania, Bulgaria, Lithuania, Latvia, Estonia, Germany, Poland, and Romania. As of 2019, lustration laws had not been passed in Belarus, nor in former Yugoslavia or the former Soviet Central Asian Republics (Kazakhstan, Kyrgyzstan, Tajikistan, and Uzbekistan).

=== Results ===
Lustration can serve as a form of punishment by anti-communist politicians who were dissidents under a Communist-led government. Lustration laws are usually passed right before elections, and become tightened when right-wing governments are in power, and loosened while social-democratic parties are in power. It is claimed that lustration systems based on dismissal or confession might be able to increase trust in government, while those based on confession might be able to promote social reconciliation.

There are, however, some paradoxal side effects of the process. For example, in spite of the fact that some informants were coerced or blackmailed into collaboration and may thus be also considered victims themselves, or in some cases despite terminating later the collaboration in favor of genuine dissident activity, the public attention and condemnation has focused primarily on them rather than on the communist government officials or secret police officers. Moreover, if the past collaboration is contested in a court, the verdict depends to some extent on testimonies of former communist secret police officers who engaged with the alleged informant, thus making those orchestrating the repressions de facto the ones deciding the case.

== Examples ==
=== In Czechoslovakia and the Czech Republic ===
Unlike many neighbouring states, the new government in the Czech and Slovak Federative Republic did not adjudicate under court trials, but instead took a non-judicial approach to ensure changes would be implemented.

According to a law passed on 4 October 1991, all employees of the StB, the Communist-era secret police, were blacklisted from designated public offices, including the upper levels of the civil service, the judiciary, procuracy, Security Information Service (BIS), army positions, management of state owned enterprises, the central bank, the railways, senior academic positions and the public electronic media. This law remained in place in the Czech Republic after the dissolution of Czechoslovakia, and was extended indefinitely.

The lustration laws in Czechoslovakia and the Czech Republic were not intended to serve as justice, but to ensure that events such as the Communist coup of February 1948 did not happen again.

=== In Poland ===
The first lustration bill was passed by the Polish Parliament in 1992, but it was declared unconstitutional by the Constitutional Tribunal of the Republic of Poland. Several other projects were then submitted and reviewed by a dedicated commission, resulting in a new lustration law passed in 1996. From 1997 to 2007 lustration was dealt with by the office of the Public Interest Ombudsperson (Polish: Rzecznik Interesu Publicznego), who analyzed lustration declarations and could initiate further proceedings. According to a new law which came into effect on 15 March 2007, lustration in Poland is now administered by the Institute of National Remembrance (Polish: Instytut Pamięci Narodowej; IPN).

=== In Ukraine ===
In Ukraine, lustration refers mainly to the removal from public office of civil servants who worked under President Viktor Yanukovych. They may be excluded for five to ten years.

== See also ==
- Berufsverbot
- Indignité nationale
- Ironclad Oath
- Proclamation of Timișoara
- Religion in ancient Rome
- Truth and reconciliation commission
- Vergangenheitsbewältigung
