= University Square, Bucharest =

Public square in downtown Bucharest, Romania

Coordinates: 44°26′7.98″N 26°6′8.45″E

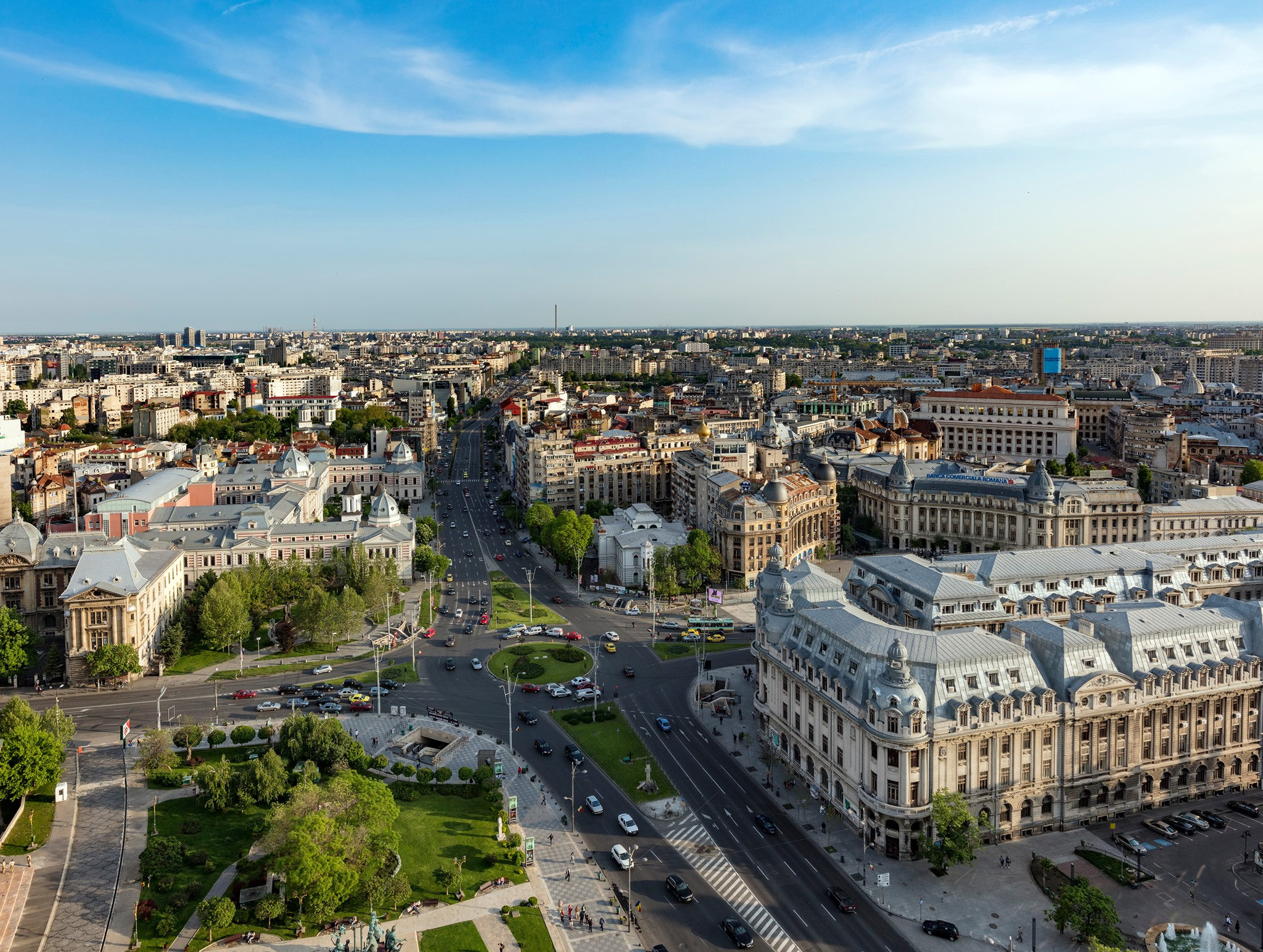
View from the Intercontinental Hotel

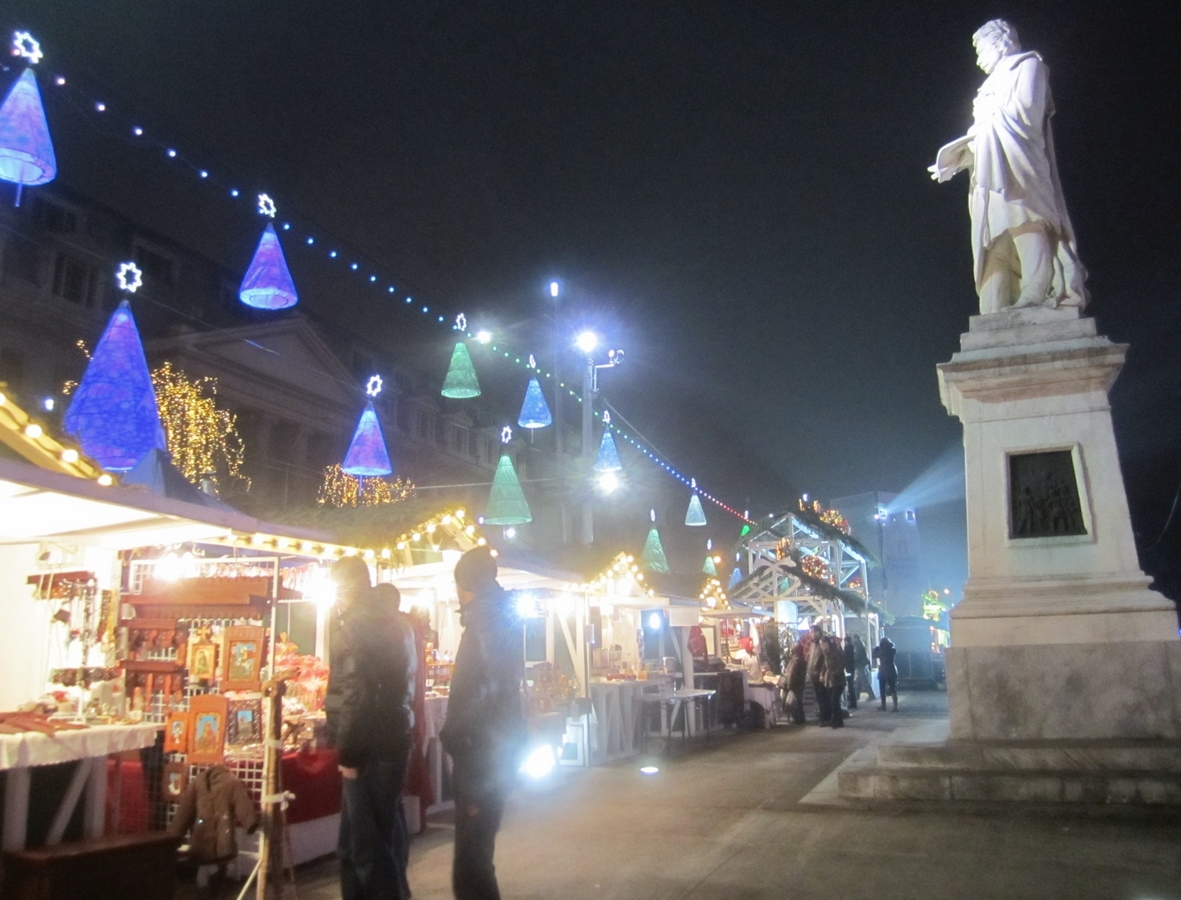
University Square during the Christmas of 2014

University Square (Romanian: Piața Universității) is located in Bucharest city centre, near the University of Bucharest. It is served by Universitate metro station.

Four statues can be found in the University Square, in front of the university; they depict Ion Heliade Rădulescu (1879), Michael the Brave (1874), Gheorghe Lazăr (1889) and Spiru Haret (1932).

The Ion Luca Caragiale Bucharest National Theatre and the Intercontinental Hotel (one of the tallest buildings in Bucharest) are also located near University Square.

University Square marks the northeastern boundary of the Old Center of Bucharest.

Since the end of 2014, after a project costing up to 65 million euros, the National Theatre has a new face, dominated by futuristic elements.

== History ==
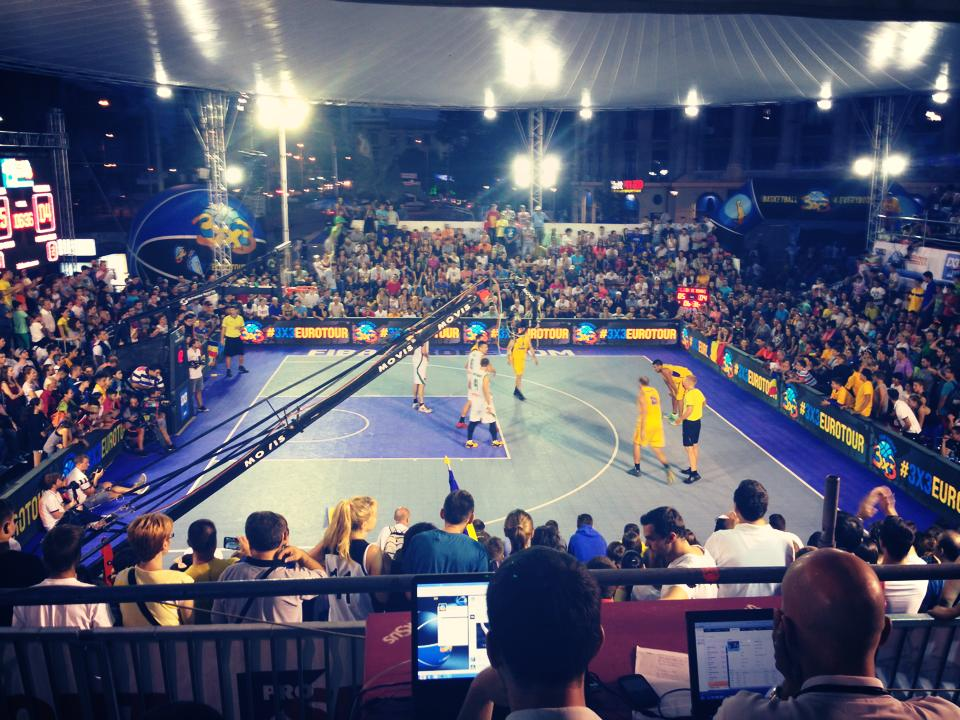
2014 FIBA Europe 3x3 Championships at the University Square

In the 15th century, here was the northern limit of the city. Around 1700, the limit was already around what is today Piața Romană (Roman Square). Thought to define the axes north–south and east–west of the city after 1880, "the great crossroad" (Romanian: marea intersecție, French: la grande croisée) follows the Haussmannian scenario of urban modernization – in the spirit of the Parisian influence of those times. This intersection has never evolved as a monumental square, but emerged as most important road junction of the capital at the geometric center of the city.

The Bucharest boulevards of those times hosted tram lines, and in the center of the intersection was placed the monument dedicated to Ion Brătianu, the square then bearing his name. This square was part of an east–west axis full of important monuments, starting in the east with the statue of C.A. Rossetti in Piața Rosetti (Rosetti Square) and culminating with the statue of Mihail Kogălniceanu in the eponymous square. University Square was established in 1857 as part of the creation of the University of Bucharest (architect Alexandru Orăscu), its character being defined by four statues, made over six decades: Michael the Brave (1876, sculptor Albert-Ernest Carrier-Belleuse) and scholars Ion Heliade-Rădulescu (1882, Ettore Ferrari), Gheorghe Lazăr (1886, Ion Georgescu) and Spiru Haret (1935, Ion Jalea).

In 1679 the Princely Academy was built here, which in the 1857 century was to become the University of Bucharest. The university was built in several stages, following neoclassical aesthetic principles. The facade existing today was constructed between 1921 and 1943 (architect Nicolae Ghika-Budești).

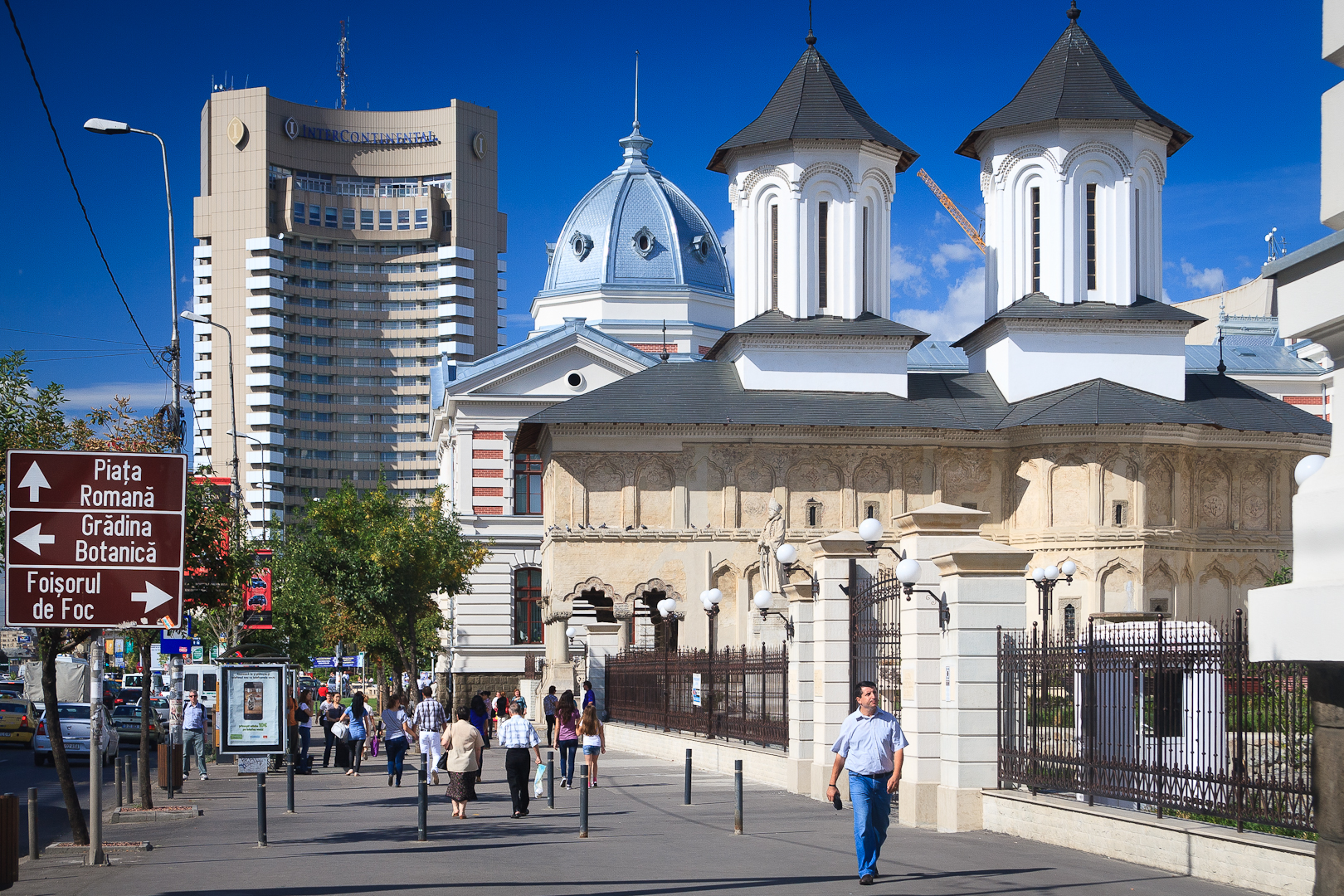
The InterContinental, Colțea Hospital and Three Hierarchs Church

Pedestrians can cross the streets only by University Passage, constructed during the development of M2 metro thoroughfare and leading, as well, to a metro station. The space that now extends from the InterContinental hotel and National Theatre once was home to an outdoor circus, around which existed shops with mititei (small Romanian sausages) and beer, and a stum shop named Zori de zi (Daylight). All this disappeared after urban planning in the 1960s proposed the idea of developing the area through tourism, cultural or administrative functions. Between 1968 and 1970 the Hotel InterContinental (architects Dinu Hariton, Gheorghe Nădrag, Ion Moscu and Romeo Belea) was built, and the new National Theatre was constructed between 1964 and 1973 in the style of that period, the halls being equipped with top stage installations. Damaged during the 1977 earthquake, the theater was rebuilt 1982–1984, under the aegis of Cezar Lăzărescu, in a heavy form and lacking spectacular elements. The square was the site of the 1990 Golaniad, a peaceful student protest against the ex-communists in the Romanian government. The demonstrations ended violently when miners from the Jiu Valley were called in by president Ion Iliescu to restore order in Bucharest (see: Mineriad).

== Events ==
In September 2014 the 2014 FIBA Europe 3x3 Championships, the European Championships of 3x3 basketball, were contested at the University Square.
